= Tourism in Pakistan =

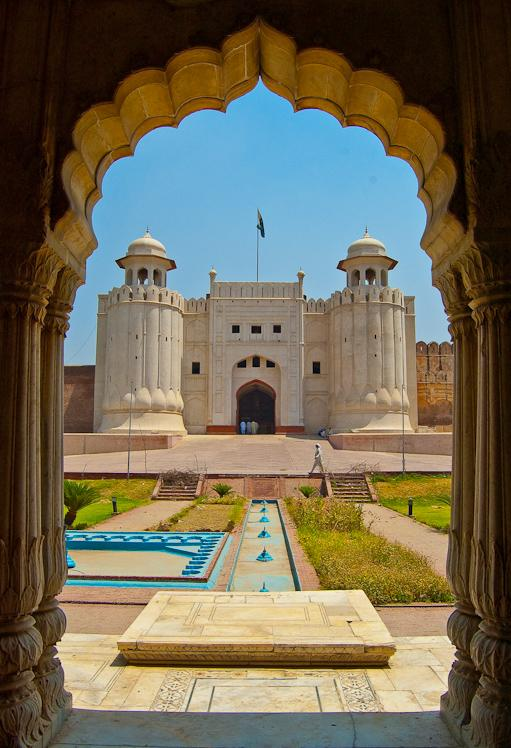
Alamgiri Gate at Lahore Fort, Punjab

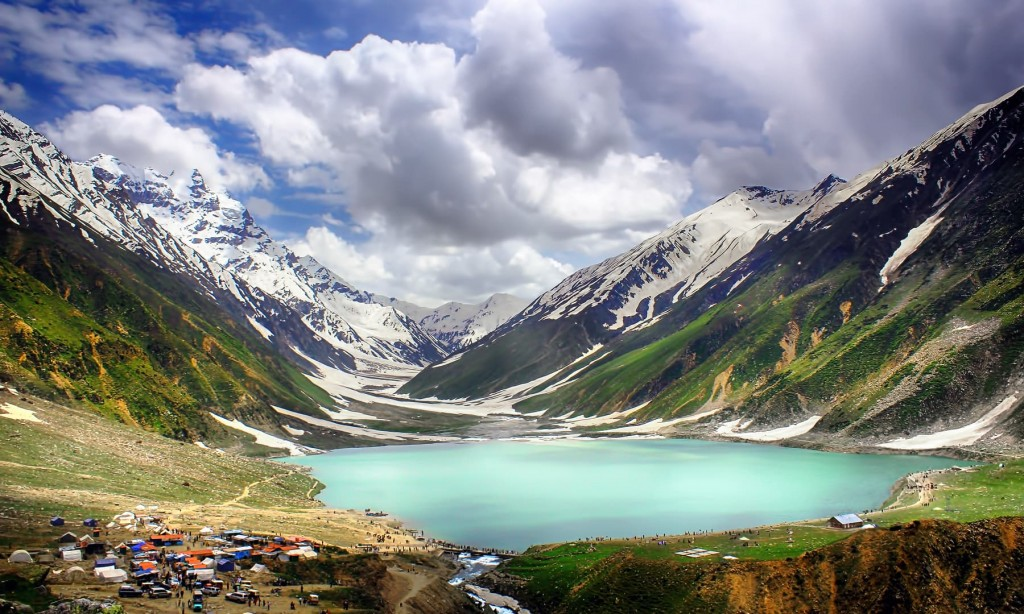
Lake Saiful Muluk, located at the northern end of the Kaghan Valley, near the town of Naran in the Saiful Muluk National Park.

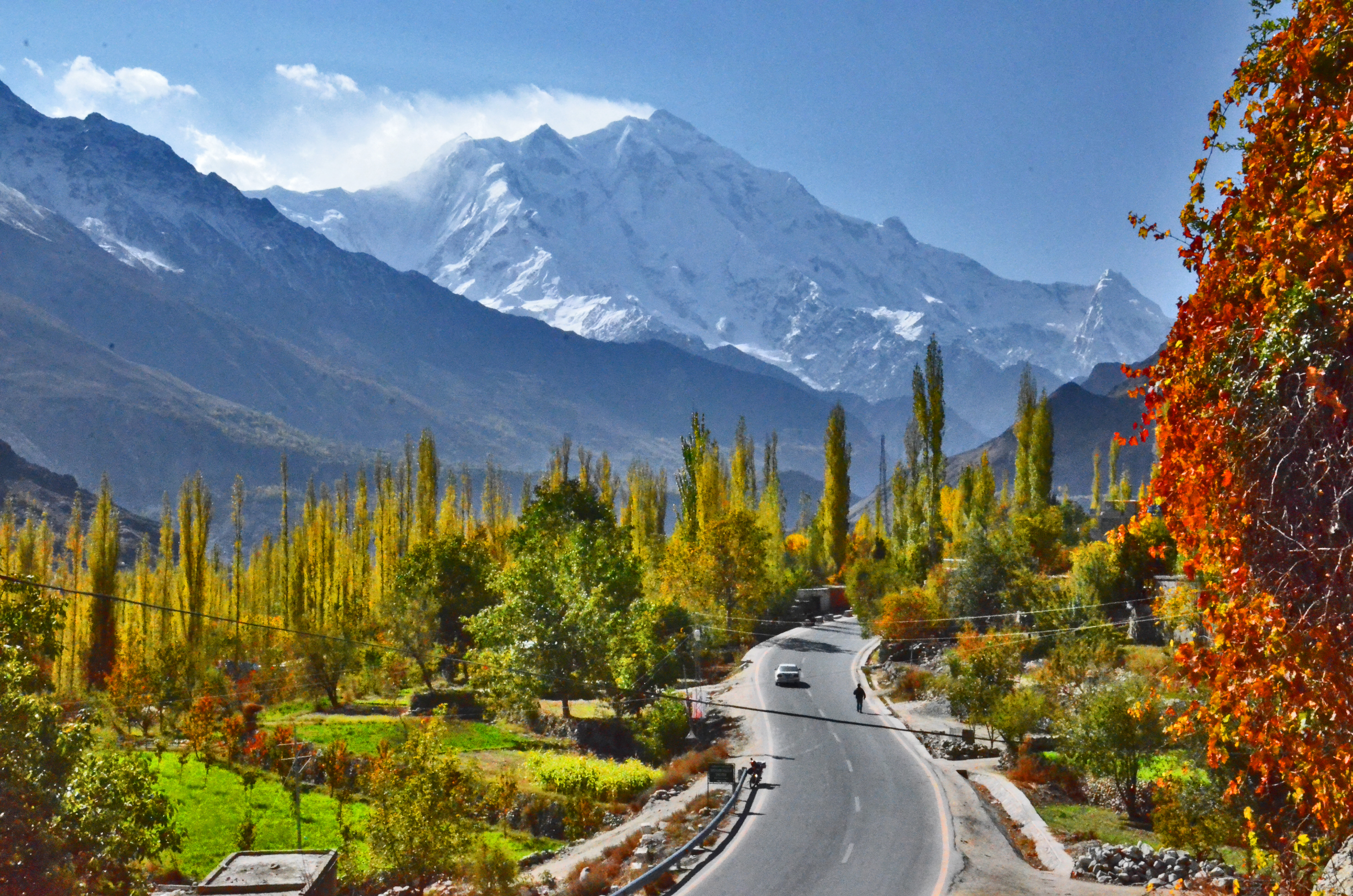
The 7,788-metre-tall (25,551 ft) Rakaposhi mountain towers over Hunza Valley.

Tourism in Pakistan is a growing industry. Pakistan was a stop along the Hippie trail from the mid-1950s to the late 1970s. In 2010, Lonely Planet termed Pakistan "tourism's 'next big thing'". The country is geographically and ethnically diverse, and has a number of historical and cultural heritage sites. Condé Nast Traveller ranked Pakistan The Best Holiday Destination for 2020 and also declared it the third-highest potential adventure destination in the world for 2020. As security in the country improves, tourism increases; in two years, it has increased by more than 300%.

In 2018, the British Backpacker Society ranked Pakistan the world's top adventure travel destination, describing the country as "one of the friendliest countries on earth, with mountain scenery that is beyond anyone's wildest imagination". Forbes ranked Pakistan as one of the ‘coolest places’ to visit in 2019. The World Economic Forum's Travel and Tourism Competitiveness Report placed Pakistan in the top 25 percent of global destinations for its World Heritage Sites, which range from the mangroves in the Indus delta to the Indus Valley civilisation sites including Mohenjo-daro and Harappa.

According to the World Economic Forum's Travel and Tourism Competitiveness Report 2017, the direct contribution of travel and tourism to Pakistan's GDP in 2015 was US$328.3 million, constituting 2.8% of the total GDP. According to the World Travel and Tourism Council, the direct contribution of travel and tourism to Pakistan's GDP in 2016 was Rs. 793 billion (equivalent to Rs. 4.0 trillion or US$14 billion in 2021), constituting 2.7% of the total GDP. By 2025, the government predicts tourism will contribute Rs. 1 trillion (US$3.6 billion) to the Pakistani economy.

In October 2006, one year after the 2005 Kashmir earthquake, The Guardian released a list of "the top five tourist sites in Pakistan" to help the country's tourism industry. The sites included Lahore, the Karakoram Highway, Karimabad and Lake Saiful Muluk. To promote the country's cultural heritage, in 2007, Pakistan launched the "Visit Pakistan" marketing campaign that involved events including fairs, religious festivals, regional sporting events, arts and craft shows, folk festivals and openings of historical museums.

In 2013, over half a million tourists visited Pakistan, contributing $298 million; these figures have since risen to over 6.6 million tourists in 2018. By comparison, Pakistan's domestic tourism industry is estimated at 50 million tourists who travel in the country on short trips usually between May and August. The largest inflow of tourists are from the United Kingdom, followed by the United States and China.

== Overview ==
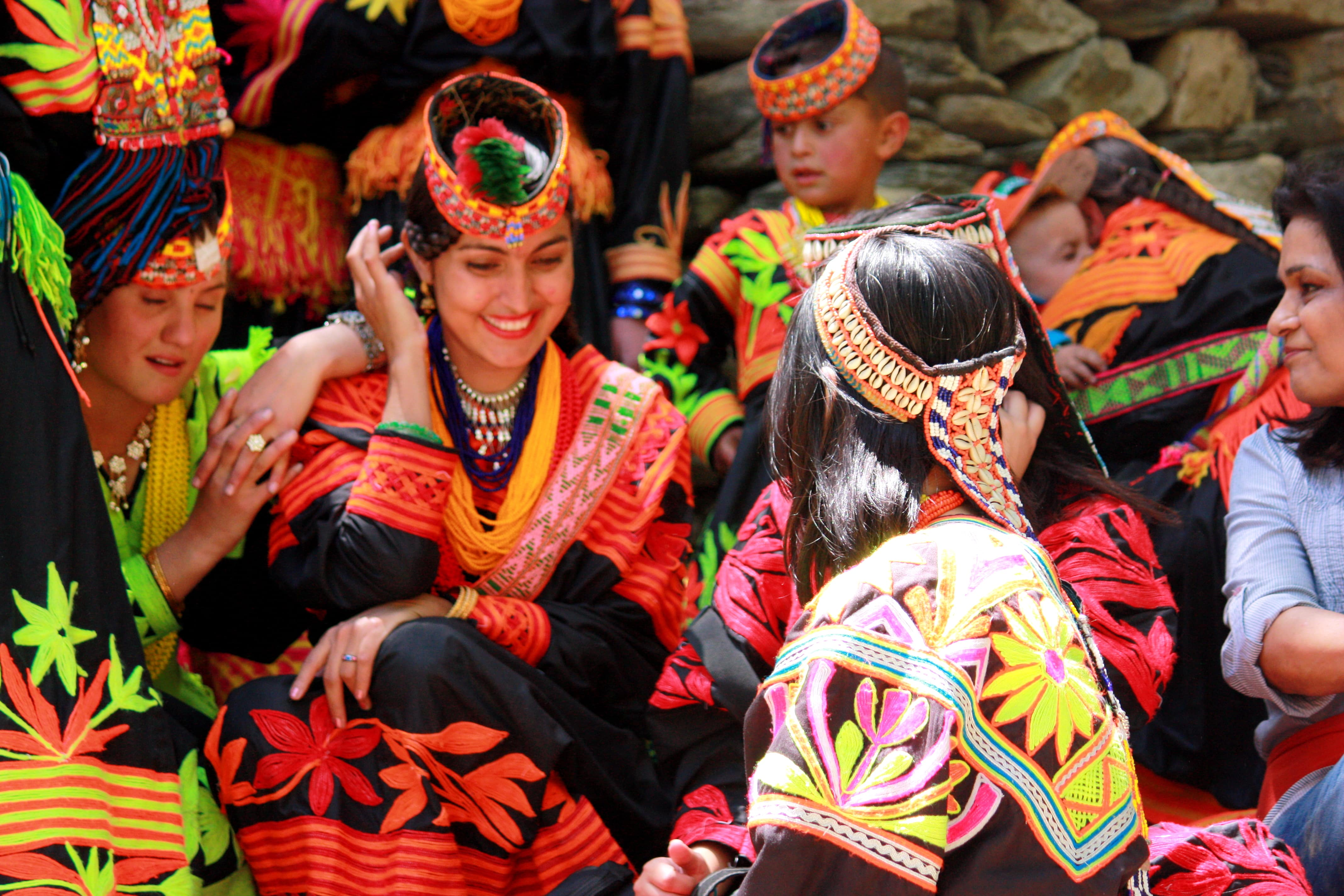
Kalash people in northern Pakistan are an ancient community.

Major tourist attractions in Pakistan include the ruin of Mohenjo-daro and Harappa, the Himalayan hill stations. Pakistan is home to several mountain peaks over 7,000 metres (23,000 feet), including K2, which draw adventurers and mountaineers from around the world. The north of Pakistan has many old fortresses, ancient architecture and the Hunza and Chitral valleys, which are home to small Kalash communities and Fairy Meadows, and the Diamer District of Gilgit Baltistan. Punjab province has the historic city of Lahore, Pakistan's cultural capital, with many examples of Mughal architecture such as Badshahi Masjid, Shalimar Gardens, Tomb of Jahangir and Lahore Fort.

In the 1960s Pakistan was part of the "hippie trail" stretching from Europe to Asia. That tourism disappeared in the 1970s with the conversion from a liberal government to an Islamised Pakistan under dictator Muhammad Zia-ul-Haq. Due to subsequent Taliban and al-Qaeda influence, especially after the September 11 attacks, westerners became the target of local branches of those terror organisations. Domestic tourism also slowed as a result of terrorism and anti-terror military operations which had taken the lives of more than 65,000 in Pakistan between 2001 and 2018.

== Tourist visas ==
In 2019, Pakistan increased the availability of travel visas in a bid to increase tourism to the country. The new program grants visas on arrival to travellers from 50 countries, including the United States. Citizens of another 175 countries can apply for visas on the internet. Previously, visas could only be obtained from Pakistani embassies abroad.

== Tourism by province and territory ==
Pakistan is subdivided into provinces Balochistan, Khyber Pakhtunkhwa, Punjab and Sindh; the federal territory Islamabad Capital Territory; and autonomous regions Azad Kashmir and Gilgit-Baltistan.

=== Gilgit-Baltistan ===
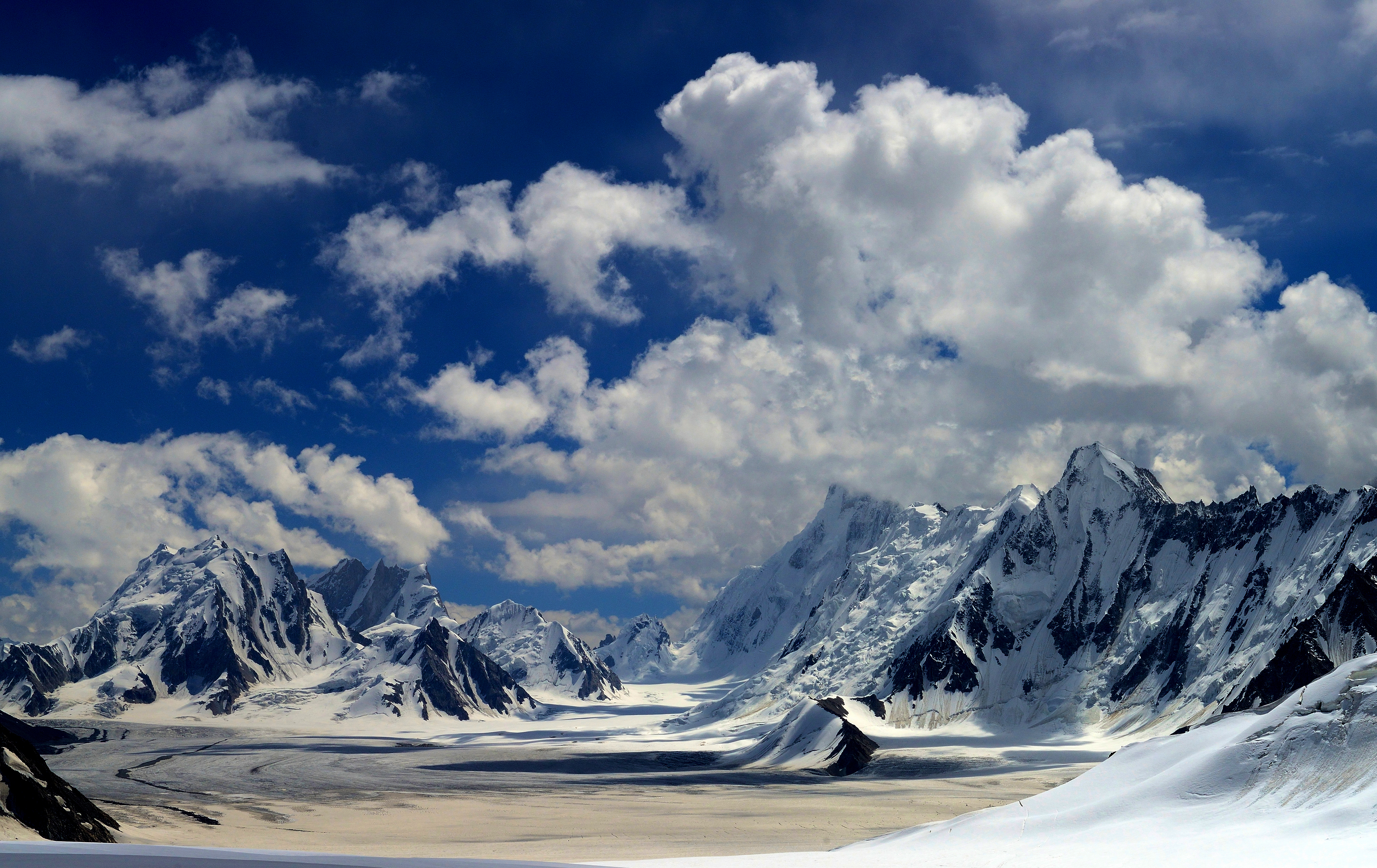
Central Karakoram National Park in Skardu

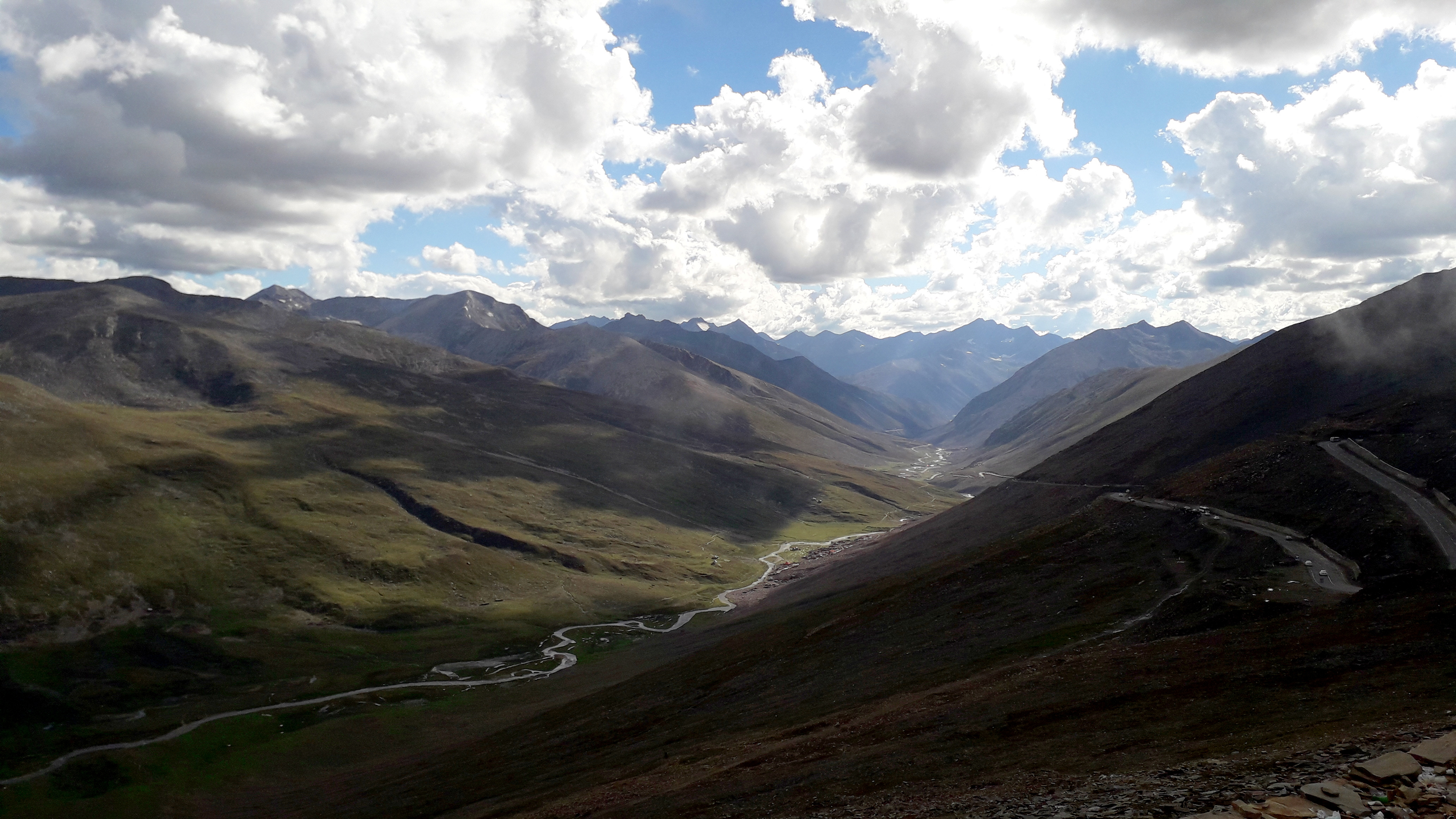
Babusar Top in Lulusar and Dudipatsar National Park, Kaghan Valley

Gilgit-Baltistan includes some of the highest peaks in the world, including K2, the world's second-highest peak. Gilgit Baltistan's landscape includes mountains, lakes, glaciers and valleys. The province is also visited for its landmarks, culture, history and people. K2 Basecamp, Deosai, Naltar, Fairy Meadows Bagrot Valley and Hushe valley are common tourist destinations in the province.

=== Balochistan ===
Balochistan is Pakistan's largest province by area, constituting approximately 43% of the country. Balochistan is home to one of the oldest Neolithic (7000 BC to c. 2500 BC) sites in archaeology. Mehrgarh and Nausharo was an ancient city that is linked to the Indus Valley civilisation. Ancient sites dating back 800 years are the Nausherwani tombs at Qila Ladgasht. There was an ancient port at the site of Oraea that was used during the Hellenistic civilisation.

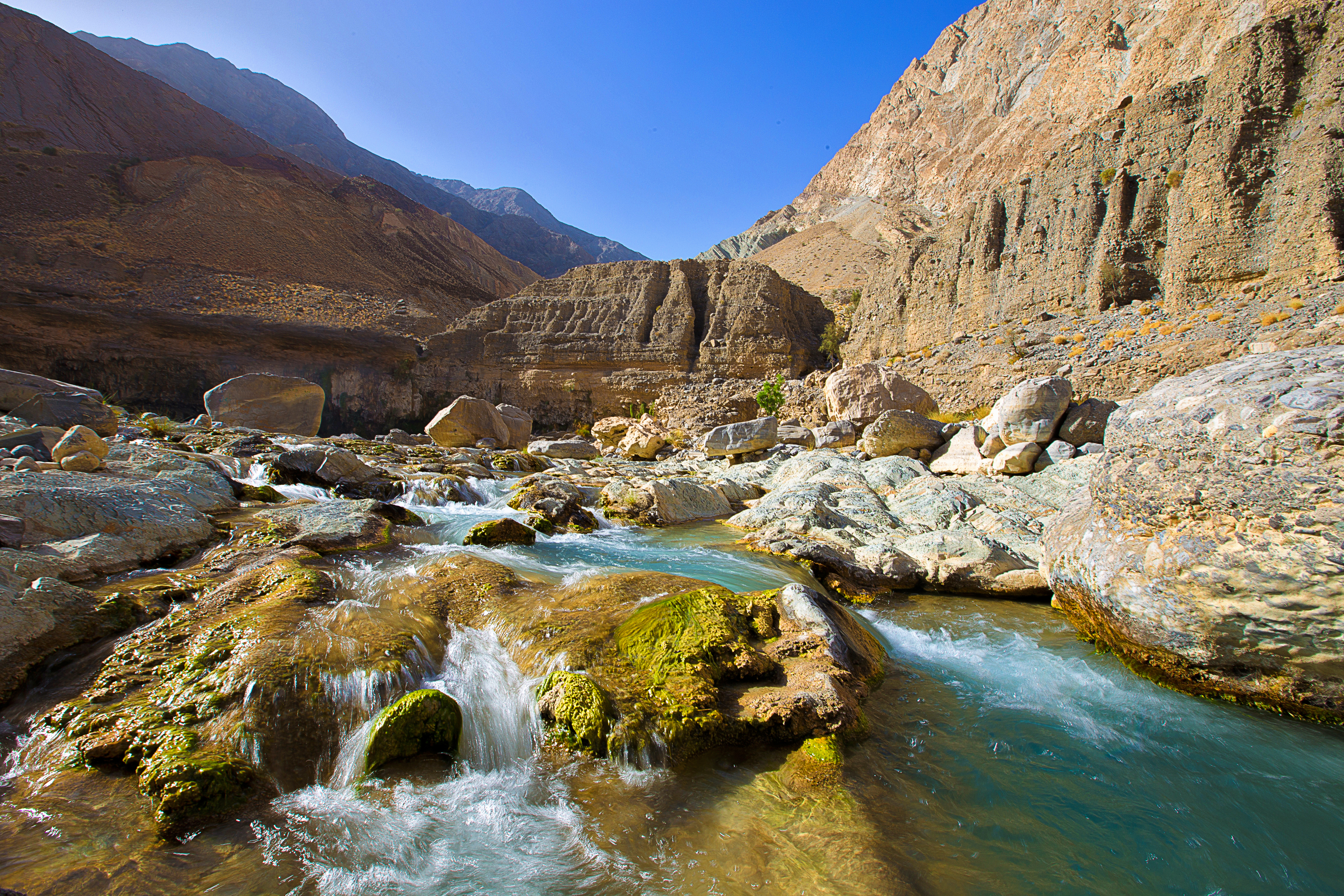
Waterfalls at Hingol National Park

Quetta is the provincial capital of Balochistan. Sites of interest include the protected Hazarganji-Chiltan National Park, Hanna Lake, Quetta Geological Museum, Balochistan Arts Council Library, Quetta Archaeological Museum and Command and Staff College Museum. The Quaid-e-Azam Residency is in the city of Ziarat "famous for having the world's largest and oldest juniper forests". Sibi is an important historical city in which the Jirga Hall has a collection of pieces that were found at the archaeological sites of Mehrgarh, Nasshero and Pirak. The annual Sibi Festival includes a horse and cattle show.

The province includes several mountain passes. The Bolan Pass was the main entrance to the provincial city of Quetta; others include Lak Pass, Khojak Pass and Harnai Pass. The Balochistan coastline extends from the boundary of Sindh province to the Iranian border, measuring over 750 km (470 miles). The city of Gwadar has the largest port in the province and is based near the ancient area of Makran. Pasni is a medium-sized town that is known for fishing. Along the Makran Coastal Highway, there are several rock formations, as well as Kund Malir and the Hingol National Park.

=== Sindh ===
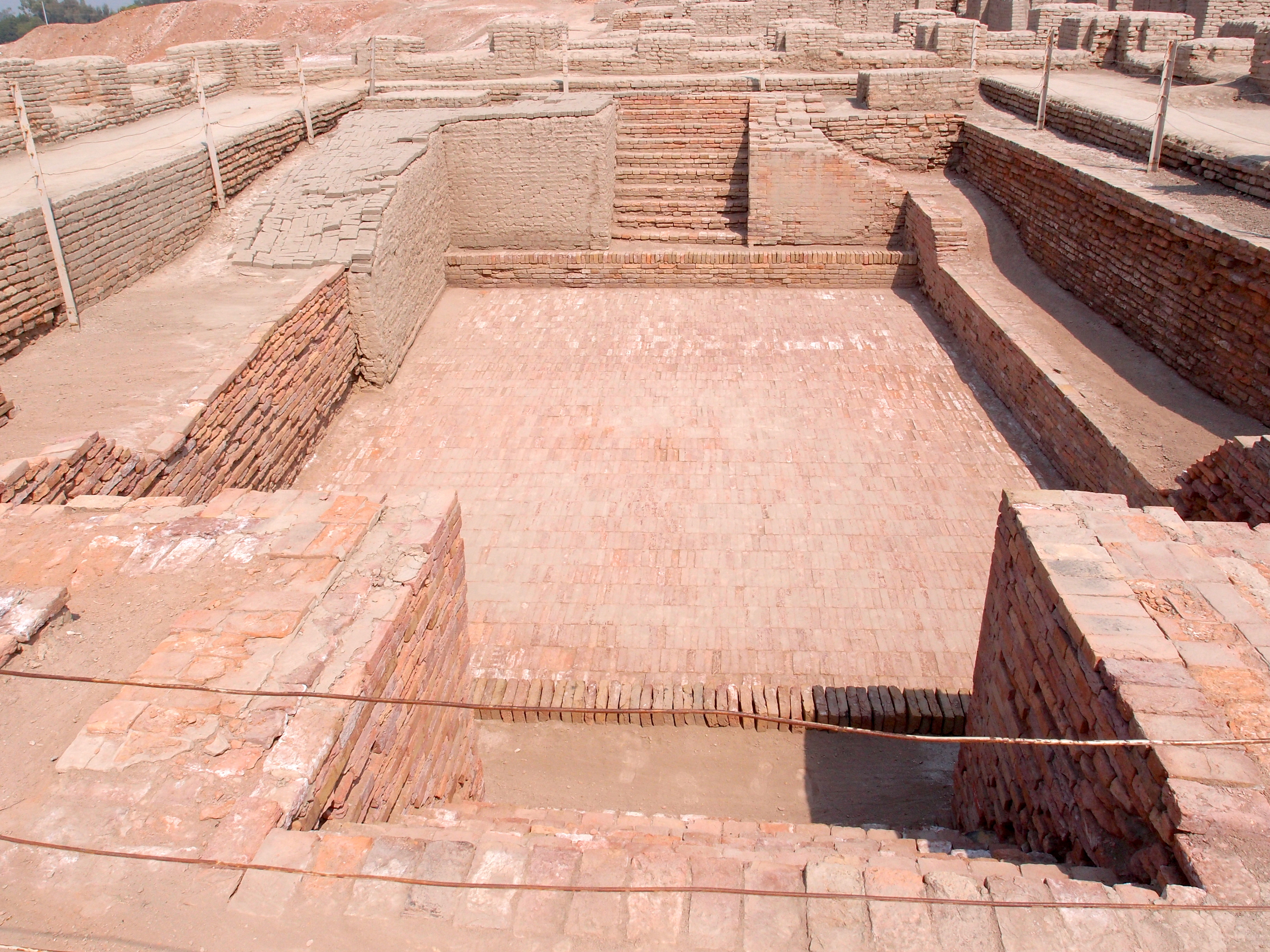
The Great Bath, at Archaeological ruins of Moenjodaro in Sindh is one of the oldest civilisations in the world.

Sindh is located in south-eastern Pakistan. The province is known for its religious heritage and rapid urbanisation and was home to the ancient Indus Valley civilisation. Mohenjo-daro near the city of Larkana was one of the largest city-settlements in South Asia and is an official UNESCO World Heritage Site. The Chaukhandi tombs are another example of ancient Sindhi and Balochi heritage located near the town of Landi. Another ancient city Aror is located near the city of Sukkur. Kahu-Jo-Darro is an ancient Buddhist archaeological site near Mirpurkhas where a Buddhist stupa was excavated.

The first arrival of Islam in South Asia took place in Karachi. A number of sites within the province have led archaeologists to suggest this. Makli Hill is one of the largest necropolises in the world and is home to a number of ancient tombs and graves of Islamic dynasties. The Talpur Mirs of Hyderabad also left a number of sites including, Tombs of Talpur Mirs, Faiz Mahal in Khairpur, Qasim Fort, Pacco Qillo and the Kot Diji Fort in Kot Diji; and the Ranikot Fort was built during the Islam invasion. Sindh has a number of cultural shrines and mausoleums including Thatta, Shah Abdul Latif Bhittai, Lal Shahbaz Qalander, Shahjahan Mosque, Mazar-e-Quaid, Minar-e-Mir Masum Shah, Bhambore and Garhi Khuda Bakhsh.

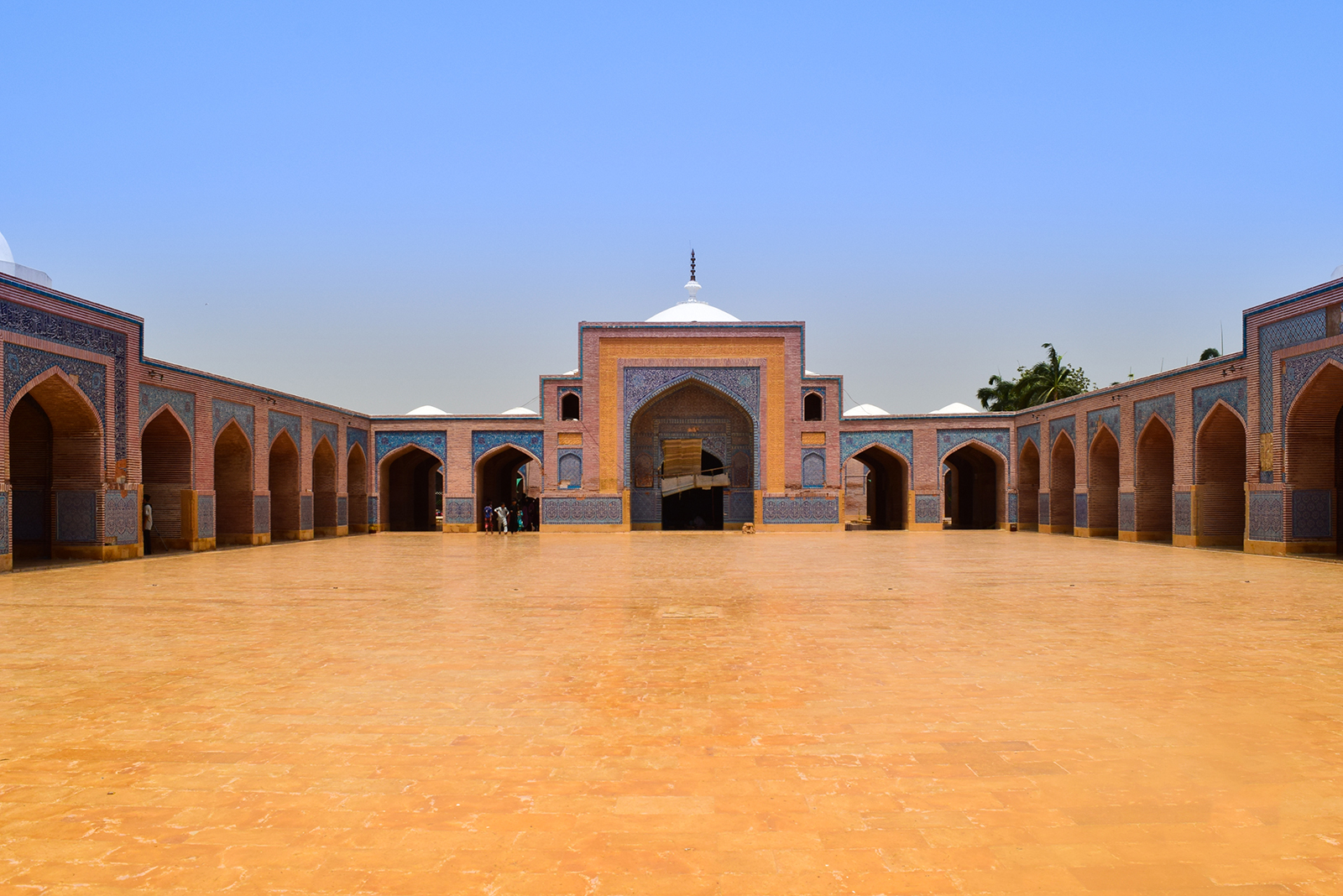
Shah Jahan Mosque, Thatta

Karachi is the provincial capital of the province and largest city of Pakistan. It is home to the founder of the nation Mohammad Ali Jinnah, whose tomb at Mazar-e-Quaid is the most iconic mausoleum in Pakistan. The Port of Karachi is the country's largest post followed by the second largest, Port Qasim. The city has a number of cultural sites including Mohatta Palace, National Museum of Pakistan, Empress Market, Frere Hall, Jehangir Kothari Parade, Karachi Municipal Corporation Building and the Hindu Gymkhana. There are several beaches within the city, some of the most famous are Clifton Beach, French Beach, Sandspit Beach and Manora Island.

The province forms the basin of the Indus River and has a number of lakes, including Keenjhar Lake, Manchar Lake and Bakri Waro Lake. Kirthar National Park is a protected reserve for several wildlife species. The Thar Desert is also located in the province which adjoins Punjab and India. The Great Rann of Kutch is a protected wetland site in the province, which has two wildlife sanctuaries; the Rann of Kutch Wildlife Sanctuary and the Nara Desert Wildlife Sanctuary. The Sukkur Barrage was built to alleviate famines caused by lack of rain.

Port Grand Food and Entertainment Complex is a recreational area in the centre of Karachi that was built along the waterfront of the 19th-century Native Jetty Bridge. The complex is expected to attract up to 5,000 visitors a day and is a major hub of shopping, dining, cultural and coastal recreational activities. Port Grand is located on Napier Mole Bridge, which is historically significant to the city, and the 19th-century Native Jetty Bridge.

=== Khyber Pakhtunkhwa ===
Khyber Pakhtunkhwa is located in the north-west region of Pakistan and is popular with adventurers and explorers. The province has a varied landscape ranging from rugged mountains, valleys, hills and farms. There are a number of Buddhist archaeological sites from the Gandhara civilisation such as Takht Bhai and Pushkalavati, and other Buddhist and Hindu archaeological sites including Bala Hisar Fort, Butkara Stupa, Kanishka stupa, Chakdara, Panjkora Valley and Sehri Bahlol.

The province's capital city is Peshawar, which is home to a number of sites including Bala Hisar Fort, Peshawar Museum, archaeological site of Gor Khuttree, Mohabbat Khan Mosque, old city of Sethi Mohallah, Jamrud Fort, the Sphola Stupa and the market at Qissa Khwani Bazaar. The city Dera Ismail Khan is known as the entrance into the province from Punjab and Balochistan, and for its Hindu ruins at Kafir Kot. Mardan city has Buddhist ruins at Shahbaz Garhi. In the north of the province is the Swat valley One of the most important cities in the province is Mansehra, which is a major stop for tourists setting out to the Northern Areas and Azad Kashmir. The city is connected by the Karakoram Highway, which ends in China. Along the route, there are several stops including the Kaghan Valley, Balakot, Naran, Shogran, Lake Saiful Mulook and Babusar Top. There are also several other sites that attract a large number of tourists every year including Ayubia, Batkhela, Chakdara, Saidu Sharif, Kalam Valley and Hindu Kush mountain range in Chitral.

Several mountain passes run through the province. One of the most famous is the Khyber Pass, which links Afghanistan with Pakistan. The trade route sees a large number of trucks and lorries transporting goods in and out of the region. The Babusar Pass connects Thak Nala with Chilas on the Karakorum Highway. The Lowari Pass connects Chitral with Dir via the Lowari Tunnel. The highest mountain pass in Pakistan is the Shandur Pass, which connects Chitral to Gilgit and is known as the "Roof of the World". The pass is the centre of the Hindukush, Pamir and Karakoram ranges.

=== Punjab ===
Punjab is the second-largest province in Pakistan. It is known for its ancient cultural heritage and its religious diversity. The Indus Valley civilisation once ruled the region and a significant archaeological find was discovered at the ancient city of Harrapa. The Gandhara civilisation was also dominant at the site of Taxila in the north of Punjab. Several other civilisations such as Greeks, Central Asians and Persians ruled Punjab, leaving a number of sites that still exist today. Islam arrived in the region during the rule of the Umayyad Caliphate followed by the Ghaznavids. The Mughals took control of the region and ruled its land for several centuries. The Mughal heritage remained strong in Punjab with a large number of forts, tombs and monuments sintact today. The Durrani Empire ruled Punjab after the fall of the Mughal Empire for a short period following the rise of the Sikh Empire. The strong control of the Sikhs also left a number of sites that have remained intact throughout Punjab. The British Raj took control of the region until the independence.

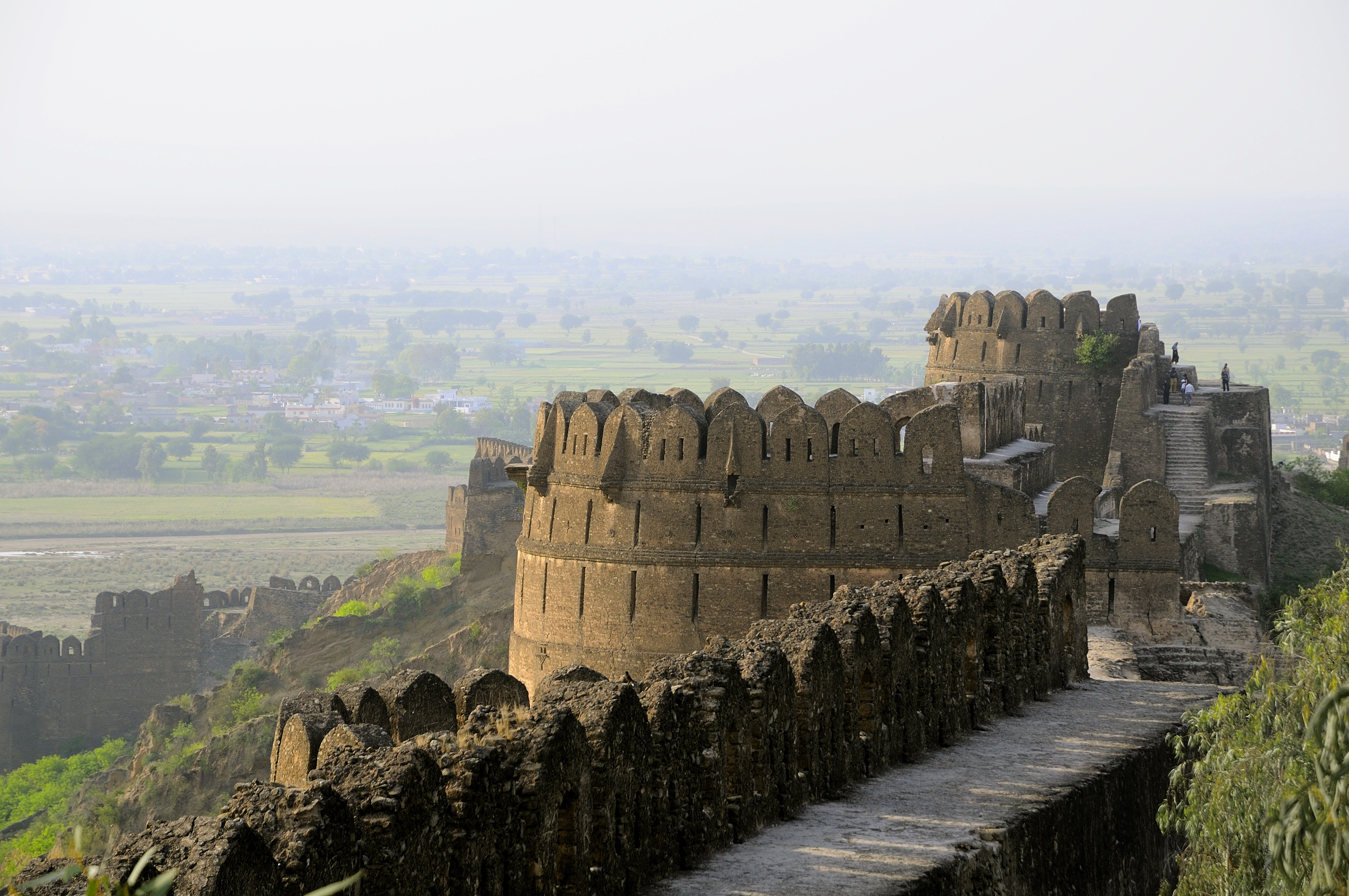
Rohtas Fort, a UNESCO world heritage site, was built upon a hill overlooking the Pothohar Plateau.

Tourism in Punjab is regulated by the Tourism Development Corporation of Punjab. The province has a number of large cosmopolitan cities, including the provincial capital Lahore. Major visitor attractions there include Lahore Fort and Shalimar Gardens, which are now recognised World Heritage Sites. The Walled City of Lahore, Badshahi Mosque, Wazir Khan Mosque, Tomb of Jahangir and Nur Jahan, Tomb of Asaf Khan, Chauburji and other major sites are visited by tourists each year.

Rawalpindi is a famous hill station stop for tourists. The Pharwala Fort, which was built by an ancient Hindu civilisation, is on the outskirts of the city. The city of Sheikhupura also has a number of sites from the Mughal Empire, including the World Heritage-listed Rohtas Fort near Jhelum. The Katasraj temple in the city of Chakwal is a major destination for Hindu devotees. The Khewra Salt Mines is one of the oldest mines in South Asia. Faisalabad's clock tower and eight bazaars were designed to represent the Union Jack.

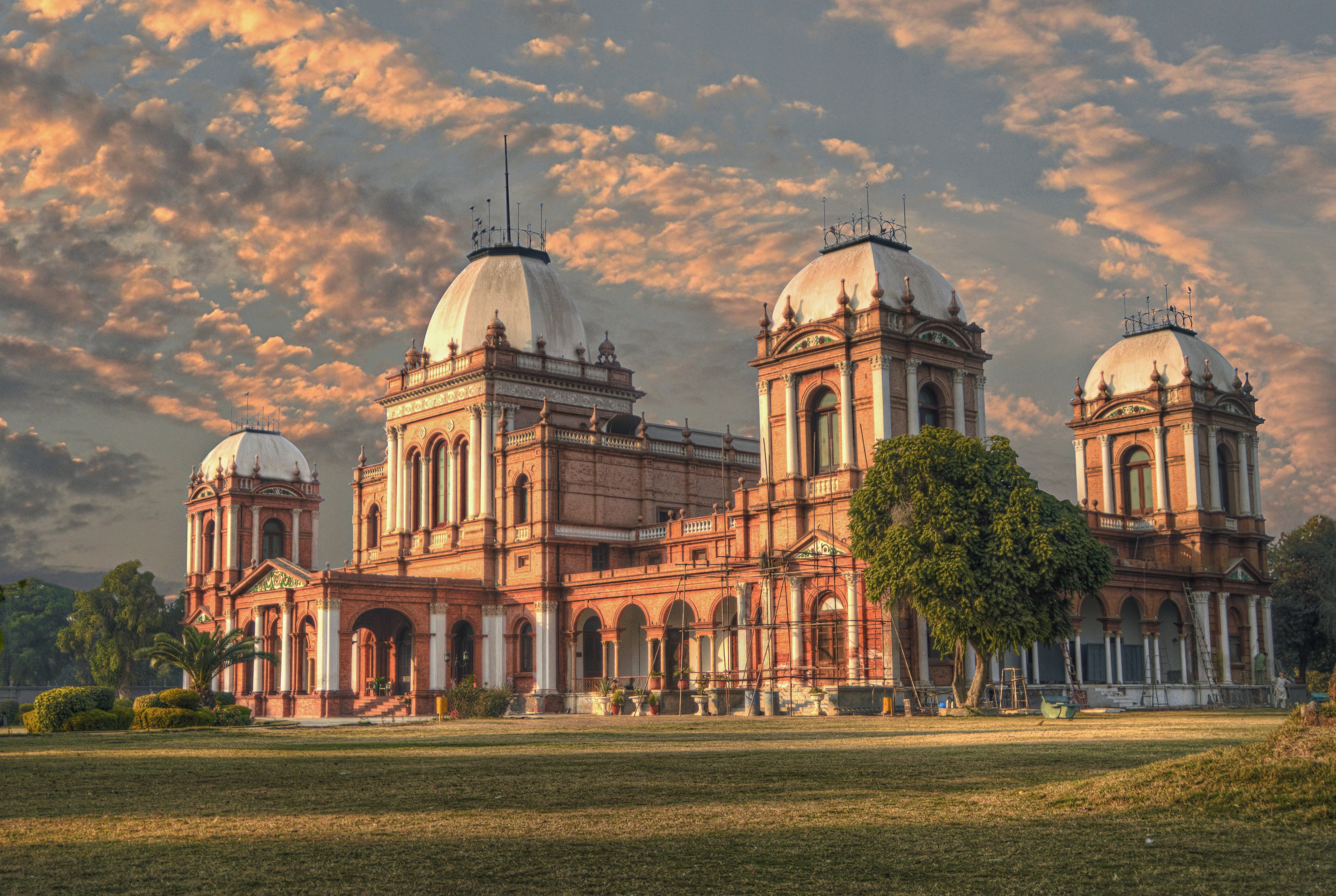
Noor Mahal, Bahawalpur

The province's southward is arid. Multan is known for its mausoleums of saints and Sufi pirs. The Multan Museum and Nuagaza tombs are significant attractions in the city. The city of Bahawalpur is located near the Cholistan and Thar deserts. Derawar Fort in the Cholistan Desert is the site for the annual Cholistan Jeep Rally. The city is also near the ancient site of Uch Sharif which was once a Delhi Sultanate stronghold. The Noor Mahal, Sadiq Ghar Palace and Darbar Mall were built during the reign of the Nawabs. The Lal Suhanra National Park is a major zoological garden on the outskirts of the city.

=== Azad Kashmir ===
Azad Kashmir is situated in the northern part of the country. The northern part of Azad Kashmir encompasses the lower part of the Himalayas, including Jamgarh Peak 4,734 metres (15,531 ft). Sarwali Peak in the Neelum Valley is the highest peak in the province. Ganga Choti is a peak in Bagh. The province is fertile, green and mountainous.

=== Islamabad Capital Territory ===
Islamabad, Pakistan's capital city, is located on the Pothohar Plateau in the north-eastern part of the country between Rawalpindi District and the Margalla Hills National Park to the north. The region has historically been a part of the crossroads of Punjab and Khyber Pakhtunkhwa with the Margalla Pass acting as the gateway between the two regions. Faisal Mosque (the largest mosque in South Asia, Margalla Hills National Park, Daman-i-Koh, Pakistan Monument, Rawal Lake, Simli Lake and Fatima Jinnah Park are among the tourist attractions in the territory. It is ranked as the second most-beautiful capital city in the world.

== UNESCO World Heritage Sites ==
The table lists information about each World Heritage Site in Pakistan.

Name: As listed by the World Heritage Committee
Region: One of the 8 administrative units of Pakistan
Period: Time period of significance, typically of construction
UNESCO data: The site's reference number; the year the site was inscribed on the World Heritage List; the criteria it was listed under: criteria (i) through (vi) are cultural, while (vii) through (x) are natural; meeting both criteria are categorised as "mixed sites"
Description: Brief description of the site.

Name	Image	Province	Coordinates	Period	UNESCO data	Description	Ref(s)
Archaeological Ruins at Moenjodaro		Sindh	27°19′45″N 68°8′20″E	26th century BC to 19th century BC	138; 1980; ii, iii	Moenjodaro is an archaeological site located on the right bank of the Indus River in Larkana District of Sindh. Dating back to the beginning of third millennium BC, the 5000-year-old city was one of the largest and earliest urbanised settlements in South Asia. The ruins were first discovered in 1922 and major excavations were carried out in the 1930s, however after 1965 further excavations were banned due to weathering and disintegration. Only one-third of the site has been revealed so far and site conservation works have been on-going since then.	
Taxila		Punjab	33°46′45″N 72°53′15″E	5th century BC to second century AD	139; 1980; iii, vi	Taxila is an archaeological site located in the Rawalpindi District, 30 km northwest of Islamabad. The city dates back to the Gandhara period and contains the ruins of the Gandhāran city of Takṣaśilā which was an important Hindu and Buddhist centre, and is still considered a place of religious and historical sanctity in those traditions.	
Buddhist Ruins of Takht-i-Bahi and Neighbouring City Remains at Sahr-i-Bahlol		Khyber Pakhtunkhwa	34°19′15″N 71°56′45″E	1st century	140; 1980; iv	Takht-i-Bahi, meaning spring throne, is a Buddhist monastic complex dating to the first century BC located on top of a 152 m high hill. The ruins are located about 16 km from Mardan and 80 km from Peshawar. Sahr-i-Bahlol is a small fortified city, dating from the same era, located near Takht-i-Bahi. The historical complex is a complete Buddhist monastery consisting of four main groups; the Court of Stupas, a monastic complex, a temple complex, and a tantric monastic complex.	
Fort and Shalamar Gardens in Lahore		Punjab	31°35′25″N 74°18′35″E	1556	171; 1981; i, ii, iii	The Fort and Shalamar Gardens in Lahore are two distinct royal complexes from the Mughal era. The Fort is located at the northwest corner of the Walled City of Lahore and has been destroyed and rebuilt several times during its history. The Shalamar Gardens are example of Mughal Gardens which were constructed by the emperor Shah Jahan in 1642. The gardens are influenced by Persian and Islamic traditions and cover 16 hectares of land area.	
Makli Necropolis		Sindh	24°46′0″N 67°54′0″E	14th century to 18th century	143; 1981; iii	Makli is a necropolis in the archaeological city of Thatta dating back to the 14th century. The monuments and mausoleums in Makli are built from high quality stone, brick, and glazed tiles representing the civilisation of Sindh of the time. Tombs of famous saints and rulers including Jam Nizamuddin II are still preserved and are evidence of Hindu, Mughal, and Islamic architecture.	
Rohtas Fort		Punjab	32°57′45″N 73°35′20″E	1541	586; 1997; ii, iv	Rohtas Fort is a garrison fort built by Sher Shah Suri, located about 16 km from Jhelum in Punjab, Pakistan. The fort is an exceptional example of Islamic military architecture, integrating artistic traditions from Turkey and the Indian subcontinent. It was built at a strategic location on a small hill alongside Kahan River to control the Ghakkars. Its name is derived from Rohtasgarh, the site of Sher Shah's victory in 1539 over a Hindu ruler.	

=== Tentative list ===
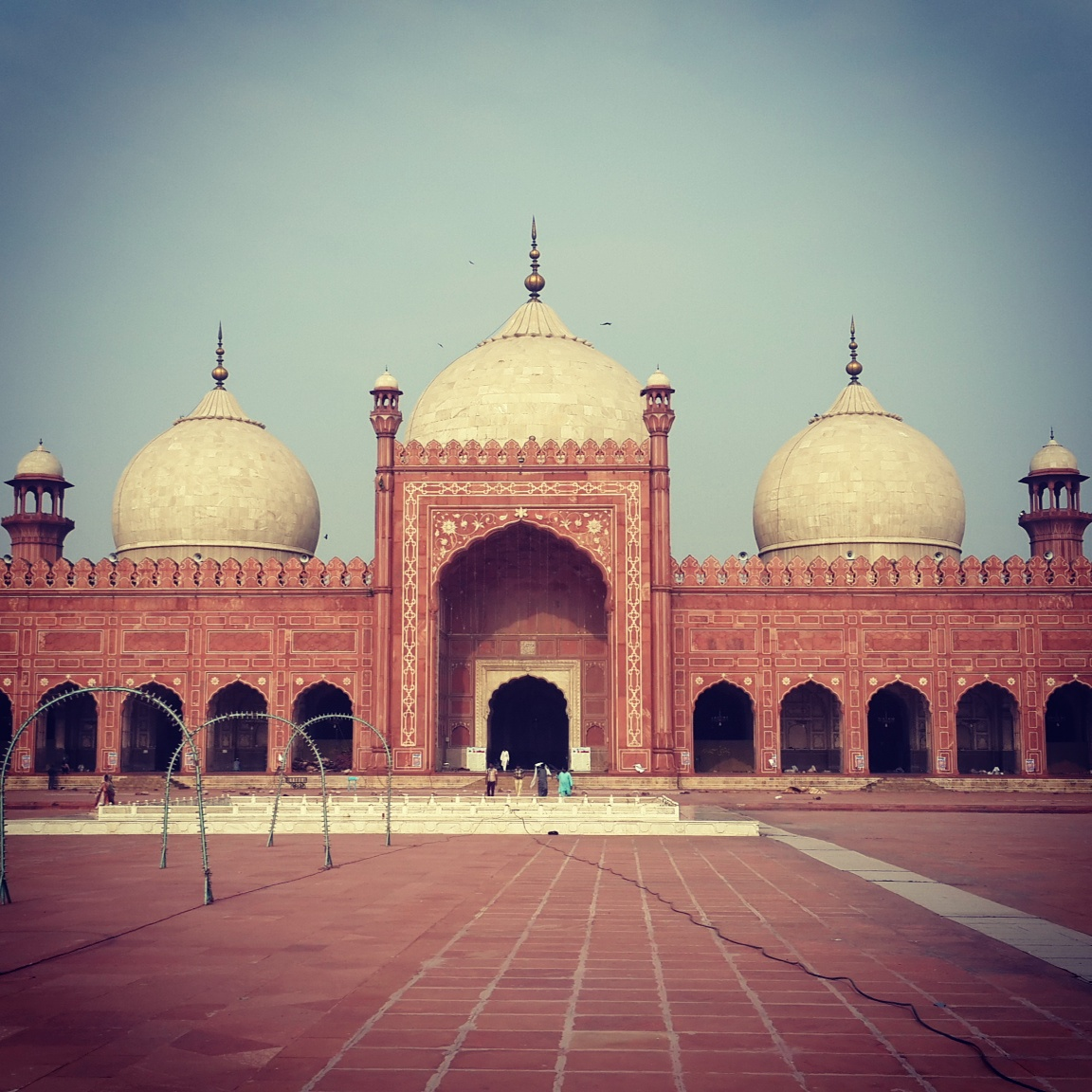
Badshahi Mosque in Lahore, Punjab

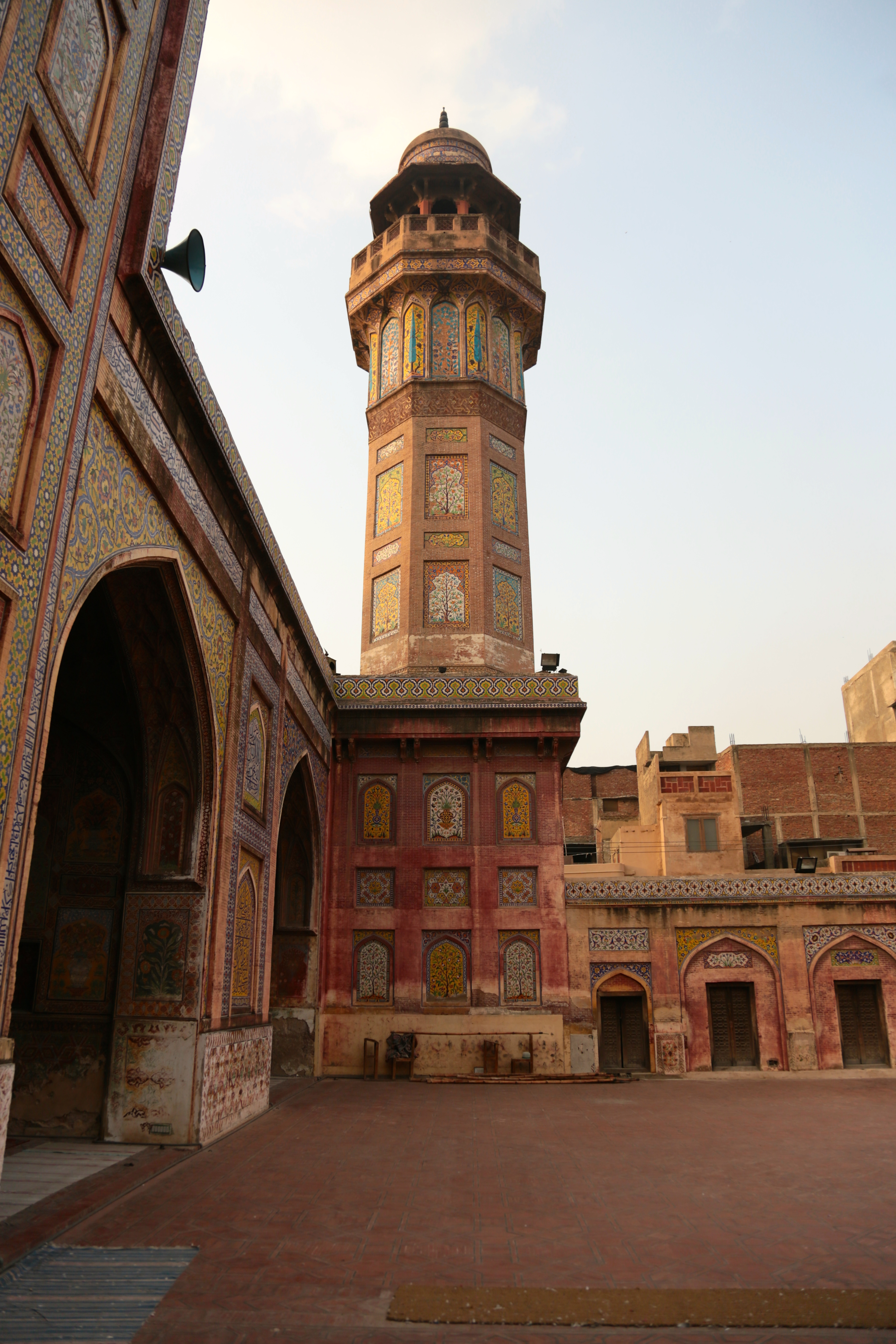
Wazir Khan Mosque in Lahore

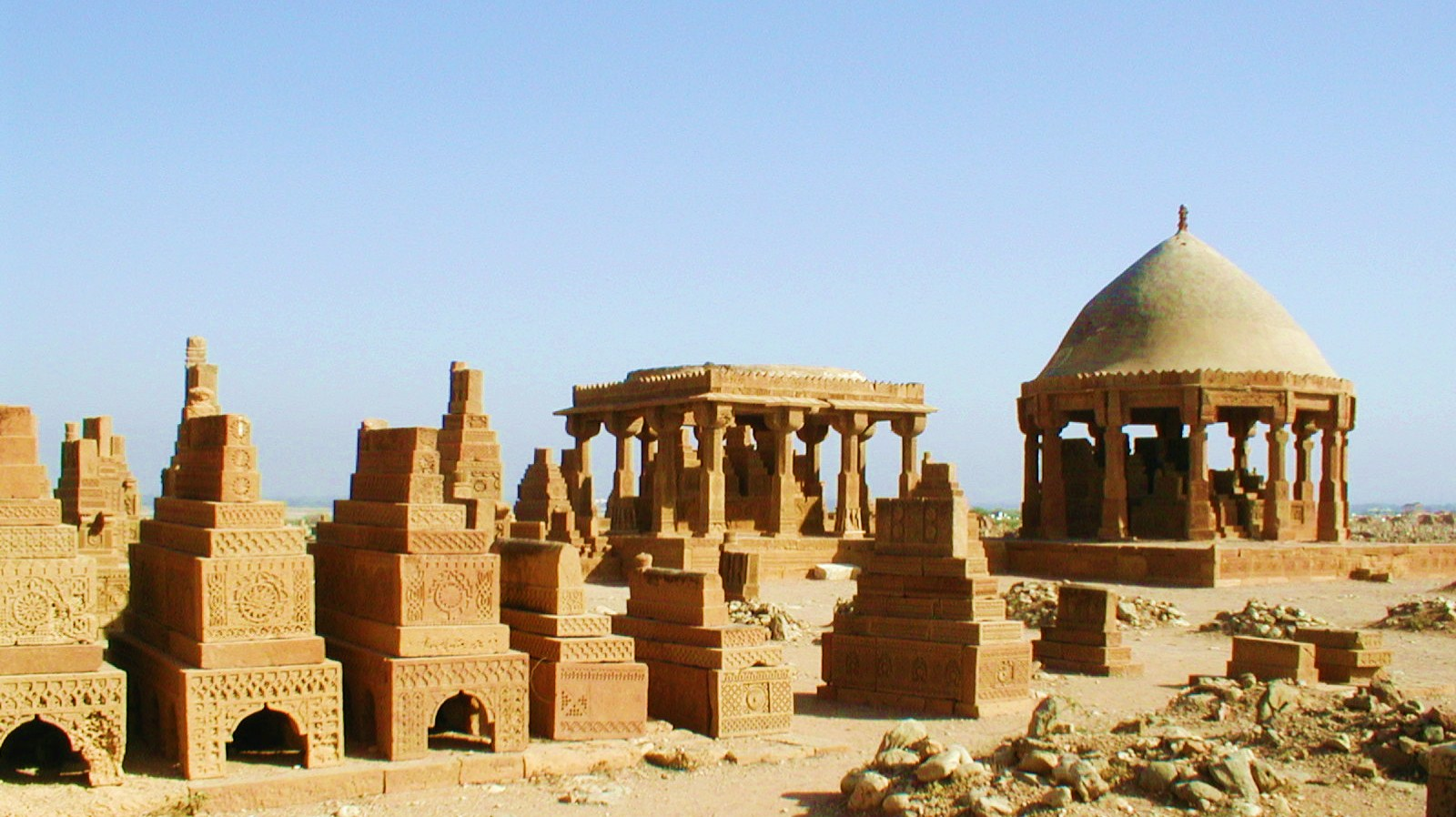
Chaukhandi Tombs in Sindh

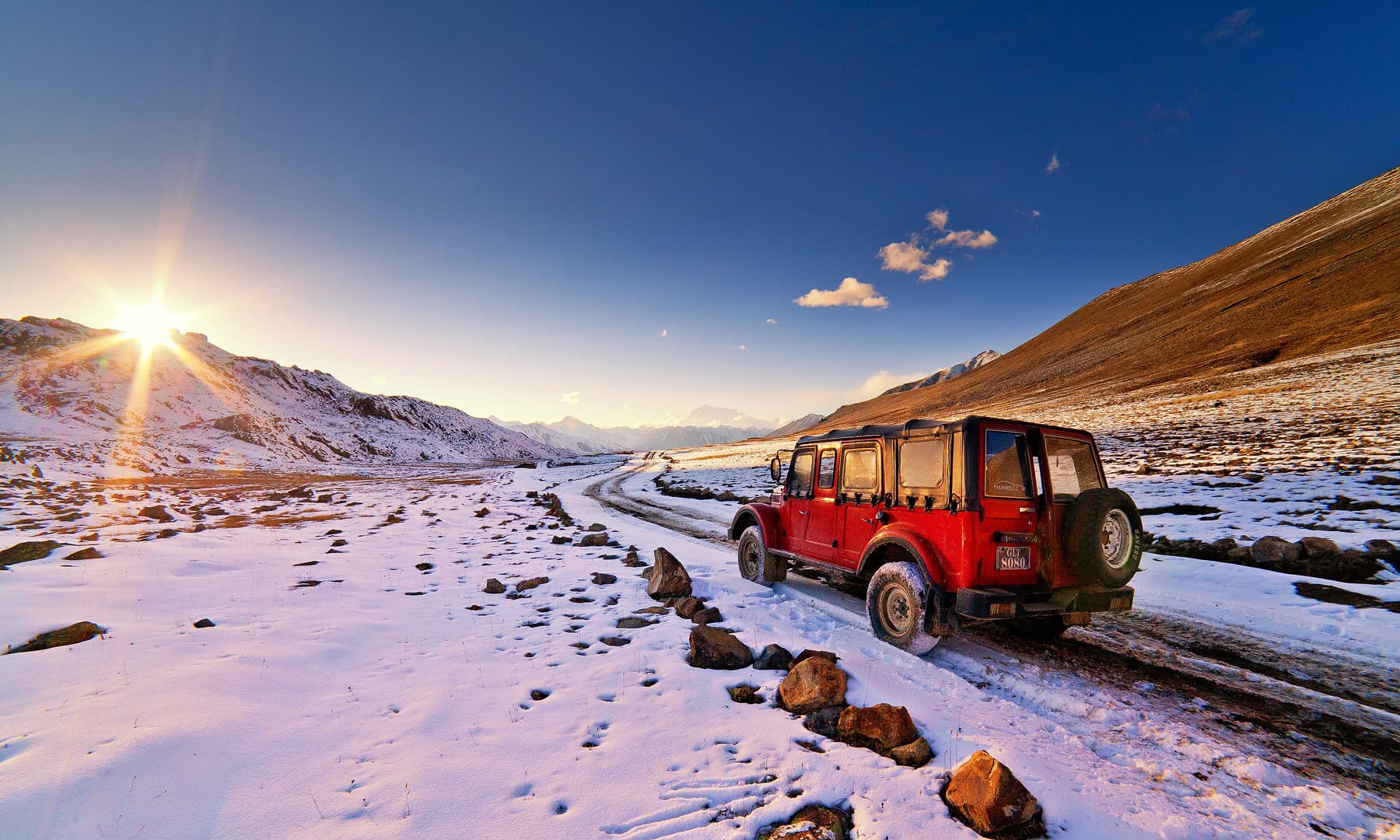
Deosai Plains in Gilgit-Baltistan

In 2004, the Ministry of Tourism pushed forward for new sites in Pakistan to become a UNESCO World Heritage Site. In total, 26 sites are awaiting to be categorised as of 2016 which include:

- Badshahi Mosque, Lahore – mosque built in 1673 during Mugal Empire
- Shah Jahan Mosque, Thatta – mosque built in 1647 by Shah Jahan
- Wazir Khan Mosque, Lahore – mosque built in 1635 by Shah Jahan
- Tomb of Jahangir, Tomb of Asif Khan and Akbari Sarai Gateway in Lahore – mausoleum built in 1637
- Tomb of Bibi Jawindi, Baha'al-Halim and Ustead, Mosque of Jalaluddin Bukhari, Uch Sharif – five monuments of historical figures
- Tomb of Shah Rukn-e-Alam, Multan – tomb for Sufi Shah Rukn-e-Alam
- Chaukhandi Tombs, Karachi – tombs built during Mughal Empire
- Central Karakoram National Park – largest protected area in northern Pakistan
- Deosai National Park – a high-altitude alpine plain and a national park in Gilgit-Baltistan
- Hingol National Park – a national park in Balochistan
- Hiran Minar and Tank, Sheikhupura – built by Mughal Emperor, Jahangir in 1606
- Mehrgarh – one of the oldest Neolithic ruins and archaeological sites in Balochistan
- Rehman Dheri, Dera Ismail Khan – historical ruins of Indus Valley civilisation
- Harappa, Punjab – historical ruins of the Bronze Age
- Katas Raj Temples – temples near Chakwal which are attributed to Hindu Shahis Eras dating from about 615–950 CE
- Nagarparkar Cultural Landscape – an important center of Jain religion and culture in Sindh
- Mansehra Rock Edicts, Mansehra – earliest writings of the third century BC
- Ranigat, Khyber Pakhtunkhwa – archaeological remains of a Buddhist monastic complex
- Shahbazgarhi Rock Edicts, Mardan – inscriptions of the Mauryan emperor, Ashoka
- Baltit Fort, Hunza Valley – Tibetan-style fort built in the 13th century
- Derawar Fort and the forts of Cholistan Desert – located in Punjab
- Ranikot Fort, Jamshoro District – one of the largest forts in the world
- Port of Banbhore – archaeological site of historical port city on the Indus River
- The Salt Range and Khewra Salt Mine – the second largest and oldest salt mine in the world
- Karez System – in Balochistan
- Ziarat Juniper Forest – a juniper forest in Ziarat, Balochistan
- Bhamala Stupa - the archaeological site of a historical point on the Haro River

=== Other landmarks ===
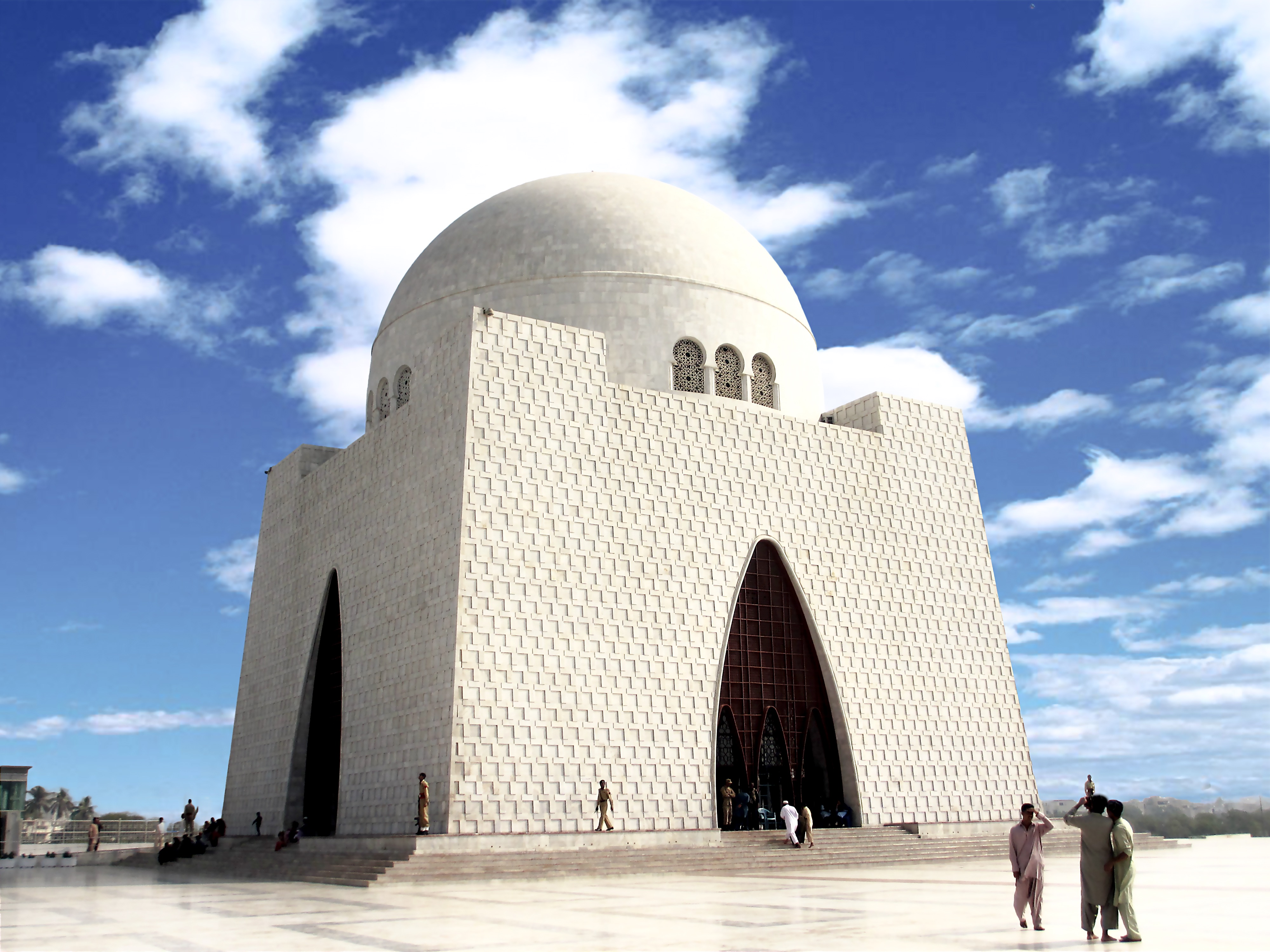
Mausoleum of Muhammad Ali Jinnah (who was the founder of Pakistan) in Karachi

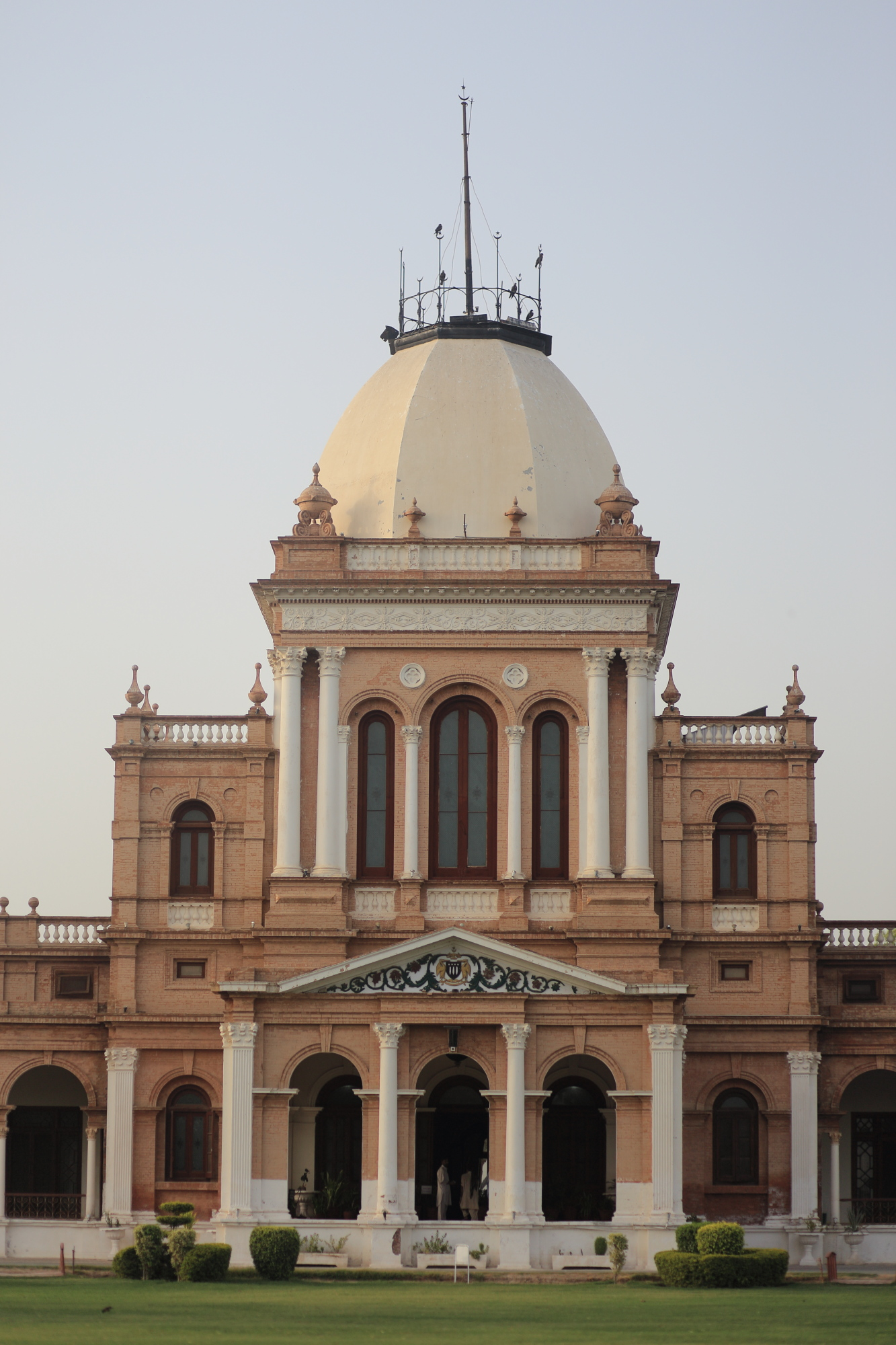
Noor Mahal in Punjab

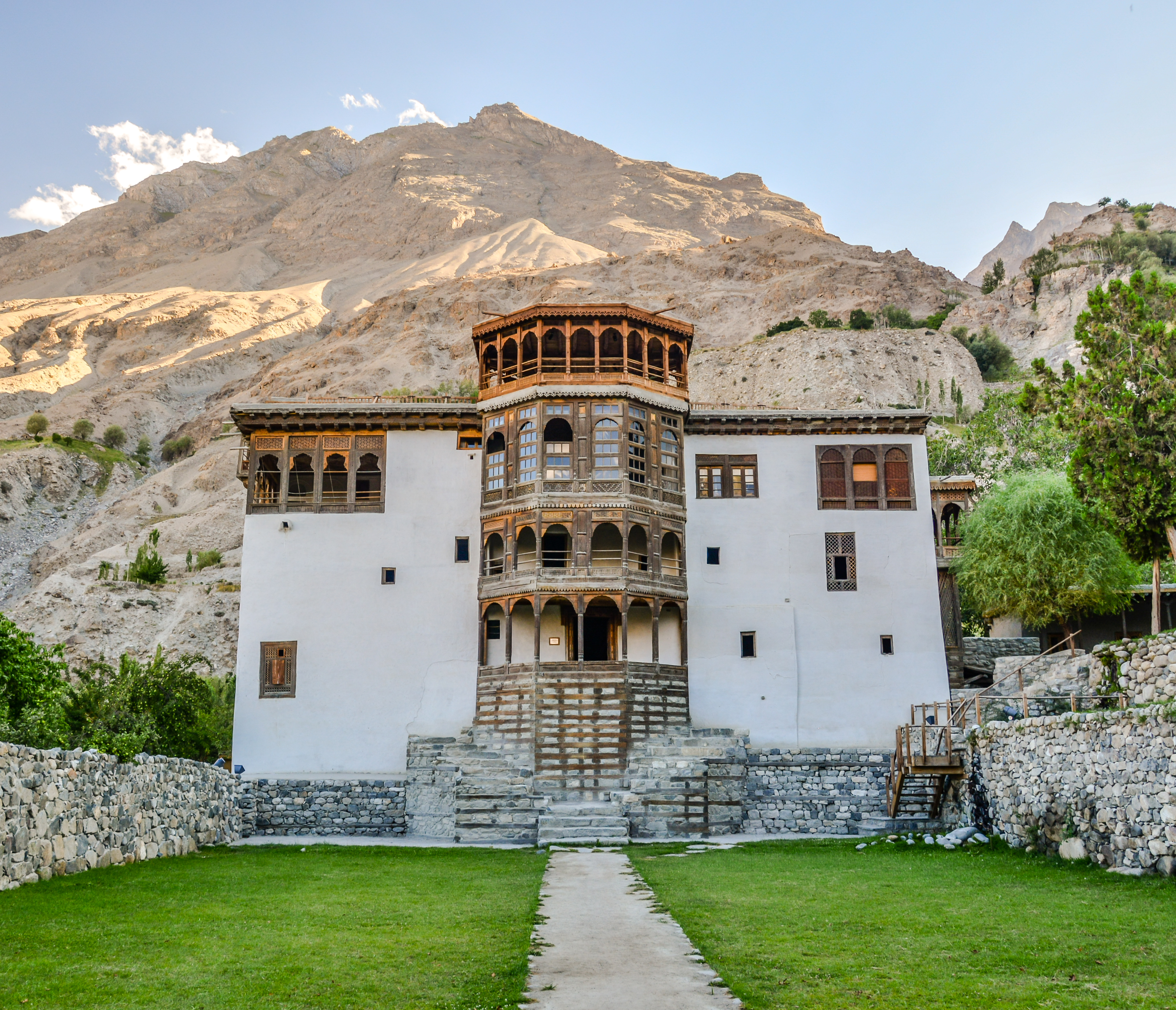
Khaplu Palace in Khaplu

Other landmarks and structures have not yet made the UNESCO Tentative List. Long before the creation of Pakistan after its partition from India in 1947, there existed diverse cultures and religions in the undivided India. India was the centre of various wars that led to several dynasties and tribes ruling its lands. They left behind landmarks, some of which have become national icons in Pakistan now whilst others need the attention of concerned authorities. Some of these include:

- Altit Fort in Hunza Valley
- Bagrot Valley
- Bala Hissar Fort in Peshawar
- Chaqchan Mosque in Khaplu
- Frere Hall in Karachi
- Khaplu Palace in Khaplu
- Mahabat Khan Mosque-A Mughal Era mosque in Peshawar
- Faisalabad Clock Tower and the Eight Bazaars
- 17th- and 18th-century Tombs of Talpur Mirs
- Faiz Mahal of the Talpur Mirs
- Samadhi of Ranjit Singh
- Mughal built the tomb of Asaf Khan at Shahdara Bagh
- Empress Market built during the rule of the British Empire
- The tomb of Qutb-ud-din Aibak, the first Sultan of Delhi and founder of the slave dynasty
- Mohatta Palace, built in 1927
- 18th-century Omar Hayat Mahal
- 19th-century Italian chateau Noor Palace
- The 3000 BC fort of Kot Diji and Faiz Mahal in Khairpur
- 16th-century fort at Skardu
- Nagar Fort at Chitral
- Golra Sharif Railway Museum, Islamabad

Post-independence Pakistan retained its heritage by constructing sites to commemorate its independence by blending styles and influences from the past. Some of these include:

- Minar-e-Pakistan in Lahore
- Grand Jamia Mosque, Lahore
- Faisal Mosque in Islamabad
- The mausoleum of the founder of Pakistan, Mohammad Ali Jinnah
- Bab-e-Pakistan a memorial site for the victims of the independence
- Pakistan Monument in Islamabad
- The mausoleum of Allama Muhammad Iqbal
- Gorakh Hill, Dadu – situated on one of the highest plateaus of Sindh

== Tourism under Prime Minister Imran Khan ==
Former Prime Minister Imran Khan planned to boost tourism to create millions of jobs. In his first television address to the nation, he said; "Pakistan has huge tourism potential. We will promote tourism to strengthen the economy". The tourism industry in Pakistan has witnessed a boom as law and order has improved across the country in the last five years. The country of 235 million is known for its hospitality globally. He decided to end mandatory No Objection Certificates for foreign tourists seeking to visit certain parts of the country to boost tourism.

Military operations launched by Pakistan armed forces during 2013–2017 against militants wiped out terrorism and militancy across the country, especially in northern areas, paving the way for the revival of tourism. The Government of Pakistan has also eased the country's visa policy, which has played a key role in attracting a large number of foreign tourists. "We are improving processes to issue tourist visas, in particular for groups and champion initiatives, which strengthen our visa on arrival program and eliminate NoC condition for high potential tourist destinations besides providing four-star accommodation at affordable cost", said Fawad Chaudhry, a minister in government. He also said; "peace had been restored and the local and foreign tourists were coming in large numbers to visit the scenic places and heritage sites".

The Imran Khan government organised the Pakistan Tourism Summit, which occurred on 2 and 3 April 2019 at Jinnah Convention Centre, Islamabad, and was attended by Prime Minister Khan, Foreign Minister Shah Mehmood Qureshi, Interior Minister Shehryar Afridi, Information Minister Fawad Chaudhry, and some well-known international bloggers, who spoke about their experiences during the panel discussion and answered questions from the participants. Due to these measures, 1.9 million tourists visited Pakistan in 2018 and as of 2020, tourism in the country has increased by more than 300%.

== List of tourist regions and sites ==
Top-five tourist destinations

In October 2006, The Guardian released what it described as "The top five tourist sites in Pakistan". Pakistan was ranked 47 out of 200 countries in an analysis of the World Travel and Tourism Council's (WTTC) growth figures by Lovehomeswap.com, which said, "If the country becomes more peaceful, visitor numbers are predicted to rise".

Rank	Location
1	Taxila
2	Lahore
3	The Karakoram Highway
4	Karimabad
5	Lake Saiful Muluk

=== Glaciers ===
- Baltoro Glacier
- Batura Glacier
- Chumik Glacier
- Godwin-Austen Glacier
- Kutiah Lungma Glacier
- Trango Glacier

=== Ski resorts and areas ===
- Malam Jabba ski resort
- Naltar ski resort
- Nathia Gali
- Shimshal
- Rattu
- Astore

=== Valleys ===
- Astore Valley
- Bagrot Valley
- Chitral Valley
- Hunza Valley
- Indus Valley
- Leepa Valley
- Kaghan Valley
- Kalasha Valleys
- Khaplu Valley
- Kumrat Valley
- Neelam Valley
- Naltar Valley
- Shimshal Valley
- Skardu Valley
- Swat Valley
- Yasin Valley

=== Lakes ===
- Attabad Lake
- Ansoo Lake
- Banjosa Lake
- Chitta Katha Lake
- Dudipatsar Lake
- Hana Lake
- Karambar Lake
- Mahodand Lake
- Manchar Lake
- Pyala Lake
- Rush Lake
- Saiful Muluk
- Shangrila Lake
- Shounter Lake
- Sheosar Lake
- Katora Lake
- Tarbela Lake
- Rawal Lake

=== Waterfalls ===
- Dhani Waterfall
- Chotok Waterfalls
- Jarogo Waterfall
- Manthokha Waterfall
- Sajikot Waterfall
- Shingrai Waterfall
- Pir Ghaib Waterfall
- Hanna-Urak Waterfall
- Neela Sandh Waterfall
- Chajian Waterfall
- Umbrella Waterfall
- Noori Waterfall

=== National Parks ===
- Lulusar-Dudipatsar National Park
- Fairy Meadows National Park
- Margalla Hills National Park
- Khunjerab National Park
- Hingol National Park
- Kirthar National Park
- Broghil Valley National Park
- Central Karakoram National Park
- Chinji National Park
- Chitral National Park
- Deosai National Park
- Deva Vatala National Park
- Hazarganji-Chiltan National Park
- Lal Suhanra National Park
- Ayubia National Park

== Data ==
=== Arrivals by year ===
==== 1990s ====
	1990	1991	1992	1993	1994	1995	1996	1997	1998	1999
Tourist visitors	-	-	-	-	383,000	378,000	369,000	375,000	429,000	432,000

==== 2000s ====
	2000	2001	2002	2003	2004	2005	2006	2007	2008	2009
Tourist visitors	557,000	500,000	498,000	501,000	648,000	798,000	898,000	840,000	823,000	855,000

==== 2010s ====
	2010	2011	2012	2013	2014	2015	2016	2017	2018
Tourist visitors	907,000	1,161,000	966,000	565,212	530,000	563,400	965,498	1,750,000	1,900,035

Country	2024	2023	2022	2021	2020	2019
United Kingdom	503,383	490,997	514,252	264,853	244,338	484,744
Afghanistan	461,199	598,828	617,210	962,088	748,014	2,138,784
United States	260,406	244,710	240,804	173,528	105,480	211,338
India	149,796	109,689	99,112	16,295	32,432	75,315
Canada	116,527	108,310	107,280	65,255	48,221	98,159
Iran	106,371	88,944	69,208	62,883	37,509	62,686
China	64,460	49,519	27,605	25,240	24,156	108,608
Australia	59,154	51,770	47,983	11,794	9,946	33,504
Germany	41,352	37,796	36,715	22,928	14,885	33,087
Spain	29,431	24,917	22,510	13,566	8,999	14,365
Italy	29,012	26,368	26,159	16,661	10,020	20,565
Norway	19,485	18,853	21,507	11,968	8,260	21,188
France	17,269	16,747	17,650	12,147	8,364	17,808
Netherlands	15,096	14,257	14,510	9,290	6,412	13,231
Turkey	14,527	13,066	13,007	7,383	6,132	10,680
Malaysia	13,993	10,957	9,846	1,743	2,122	8,679
Ireland	12,367	11,260	10,636	6,179	4,413	9,849
Bahrain	11,285	10,888	10,680	9,101	5,303	11,780
Belgium	10,949	9,900	10,080	7,243	4,094	8,867
Sweden	9,778	8,452	8,392	6,052	3,378	7,376
Denmark	9,283	9,007	9,375	6,147	3,597	9,291
Oman	9,119	8,986	7,937	4,189	3,362	8,723
South Africa	8,872	8,971	9,871	3,767	3,796	8,774
Philippines	6,835	5,657	4,995	2,726	3,065	29,176
Japan	6,711	6,299	3,981	1,946	2,279	10,047
Saudi Arabia	6,664	6,786	7,624	3,949	2,847	8,840
Thailand	6,012	5,192	4,751	616	925	4,880
Indonesia	5,213	3,768	4,318	1,807	1,164	4,669
South Korea	5,716	4,996	3,566	1,829	1,862	7,770
Russia	4,866	3,494	2,913	2,277	1,406	4,242
Bangladesh	4,769	3,157	2,669	1,580	1,304	3,796
New Zealand	4,767	4,202	3,909	899	1,037	3,116
Portugal	4,759	4,151	4,003	2,336	1,856	3,194
Sri Lanka	3,957	3,231	2,813	1,454	1,309	5,471
Singapore	3,758	2,900	2,267	674	698	3,584
Switzerland	3,666	3,328	3,310	2,069	1,423	3,383
Kenya	3,499	1,797	1,843	960	664	1,705
United Arab Emirates	3,344	3,037	2,638	1,795	2,116	3,650
Austria	3,269	3,042	3,176	2,010	1,238	2,962
Egypt	2,733	2,263	2,124	1,272	1,021	2,910
Macau	2,491	2,210	1,965	2,428	1,411	3,696
Poland	2,471	1,969	1,905	1,089	767	2,501
Mozambique	2,301	2,037	1,739	1,002	669	1,438
Tanzania	2,211	909	822	604	371	980
Jordan	1,927	1,814	2,084	945	687	2,319
Ethiopia	1,793	1,289	353	152	0	474
Finland	1,677	1,700	1,568	1,065	580	1,190
Nepal	1,645	1,429	1,176	607	586	1,585
Vietnam	1,557	0	912	0	105	1,113
Yemen	1,535	1,158	973	460	268	752
Qatar	1,484	1,195	1,058	685	465	1,347
Iraq	1,474	881	720	503	0	778
Nigeria	1,274	975	1,168	1,021	0	1,179
Morocco	1,260	995	996	571	425	900
Mauritius	1,152	1,024	855	243	376	1,023
Azerbaijan	1,038	694	476	355	208	522
Brazil	1,002	890	699	376	320	666
Kazakhstan	972	866	795	422	285	566
Romania	963	1,060	1,020	710	546	1,900
Ukraine	910	808	822	1,216	937	6,003
Greece	892	766	667	393	341	1,612
Taiwan	817	0	314	0	190	1,081
Lebanon	695	580	573	277	303	799
Syria	688	519	449	320	198	606
Mexico	674	605	378	211	140	321
Czech Republic	640	630	602	344	226	678
Hungary	624	515	549	341	260	686
Myanmar	547	422	272	0	124	3,906
Sudan	526	541	549	266	234	748
Slovakia	403	414	348	148	148	308
Bulgaria	253	297	284	161	137	793
Lithuania	339	318	333	162	167	420
Cambodia	104	195	62	0	0	181

== Visa policy of Pakistan ==
Visa policy of Pakistan Pakistan Visa-free entry; eligible for all electronic visas Electronic Travel Authorization for visa on arrival for tourism and business purposes; online visa application eligible Electronic Travel Authorization for visa on arrival for business purposes only; online visa application eligible Online visa application only Visa required in advance

Visitors to Pakistan typically must obtain a visa from one of the Pakistani diplomatic missions.

Indians are only eligible for business, pilgrim or Visitor Visas to Pakistan. The pilgrim VISA allows Indians to visit 15 sites in Pakistan for religious tourism – they will be given a visitor visa. The Visitor Visa is granted if you have close family members or friends in Pakistan and you can only visit a maximum of 5 cities for 3 months.

The Pakistani government had launched online visa services for 175 countries and 50 countries were offered visa on arrival, making visiting Pakistan easier.

== Tourism through media ==
In an effort to promote the country's tourism industry, Pakistan has a dedicated satellite television channel for tourism. Discover Pakistan TV, launched by Kaiser Rafiq, is licensed by the Pakistan Electronic Media Regulatory Authority (PEMRA) and focuses on documentaries and infotainment programs related to travel and cultural heritage. The channel aims to provide a positive portrayal of the country's tourism potential to a global audience.

== Gallery ==
=== Gilgit Baltistan ===
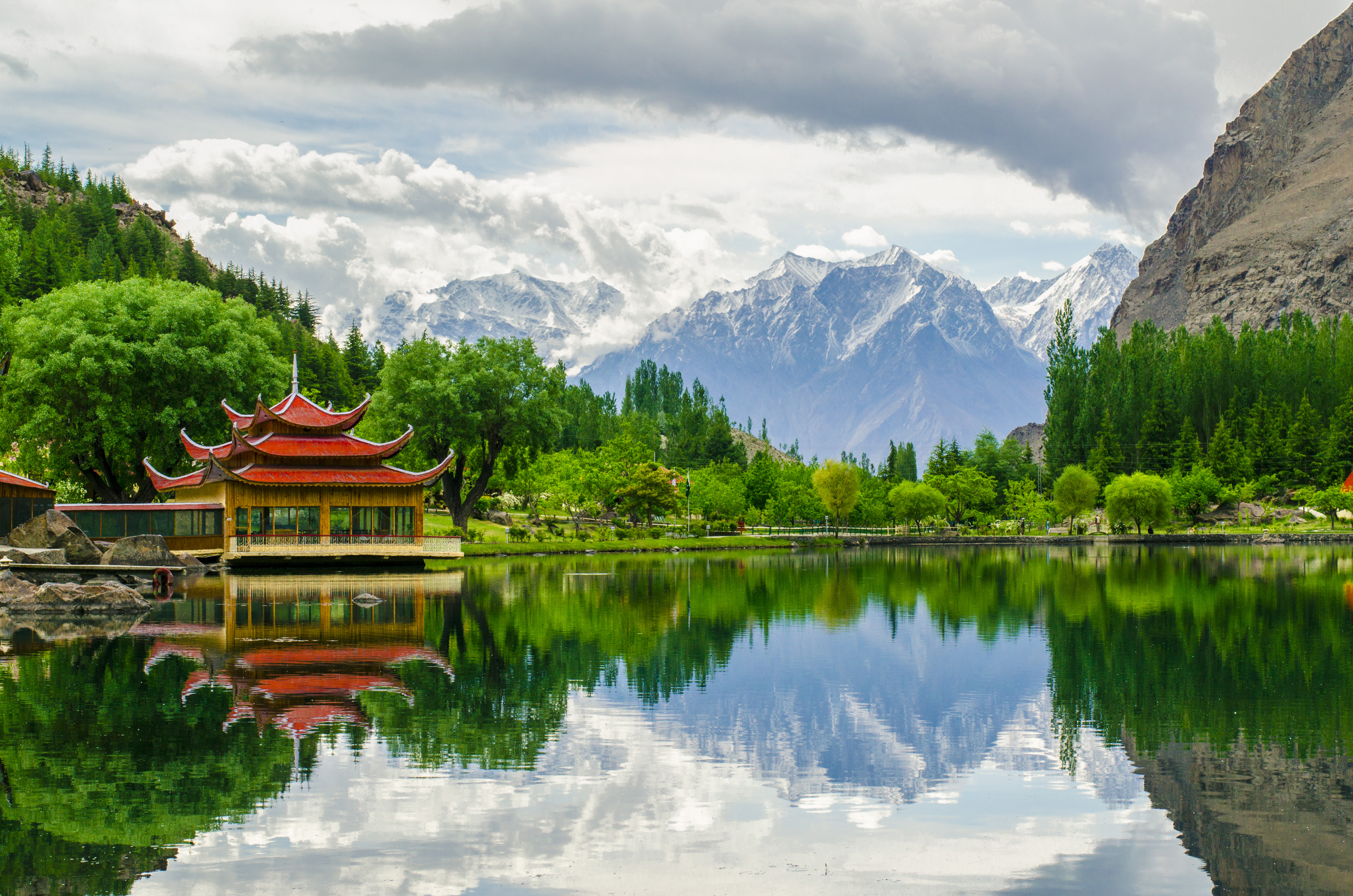
Shangrila Lake and adjoining resort

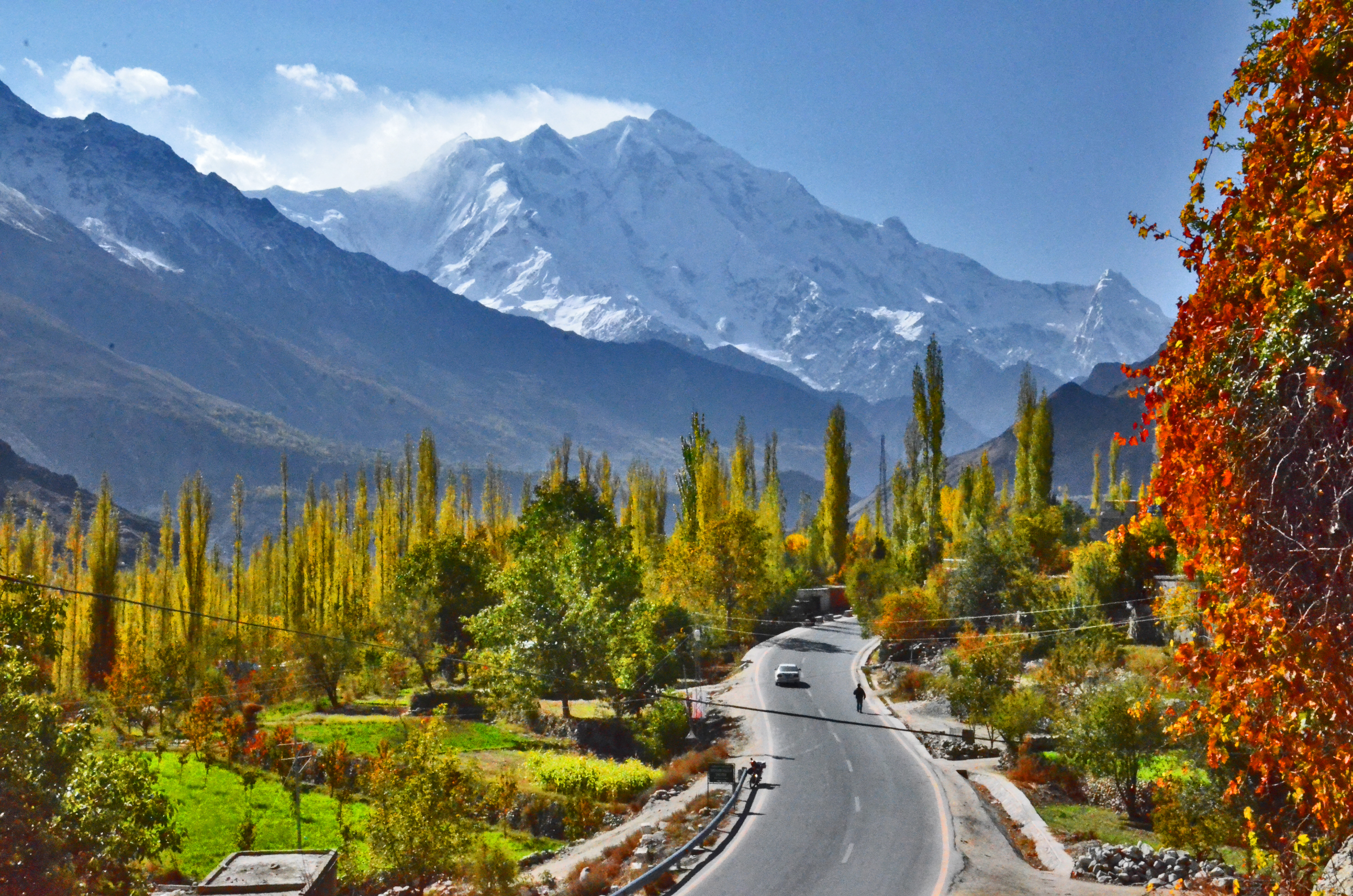
The 7,788-metre-tall (25,551 ft) Rakaposhi mountain towers over Nagar valley.

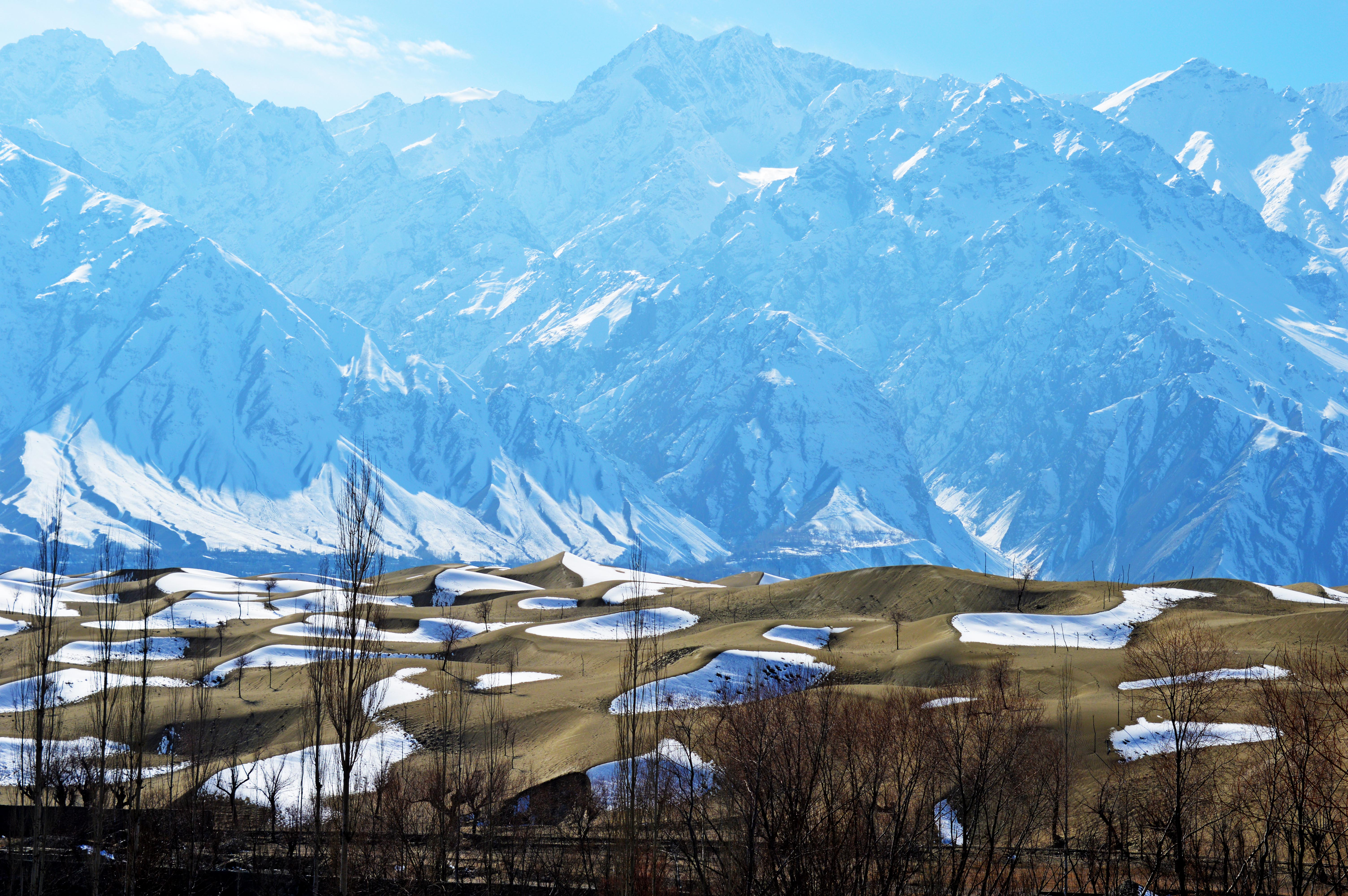
Cold Desert, Skardu is the world's highest desert.

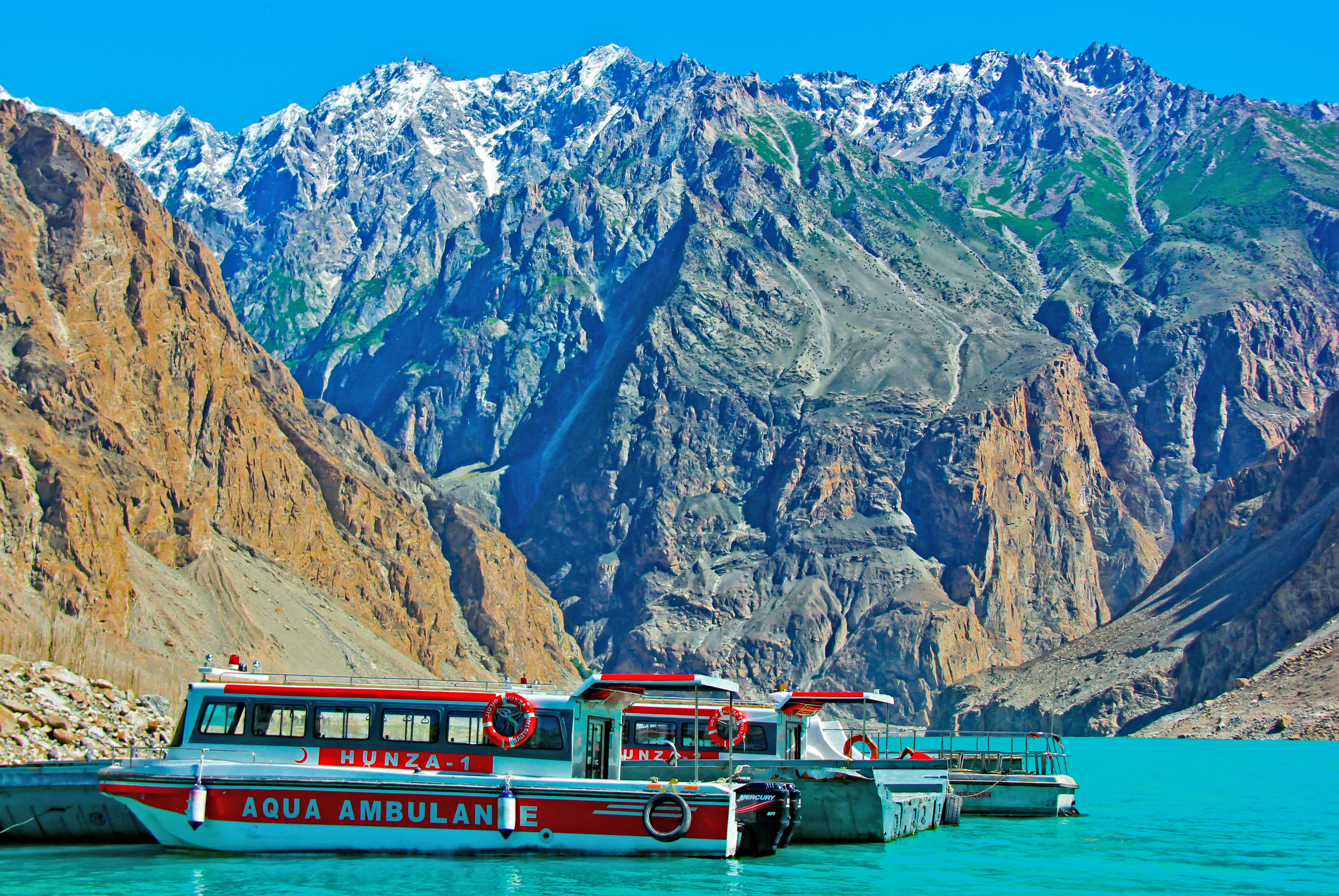
Ambulance on Attabad Lake Hunza

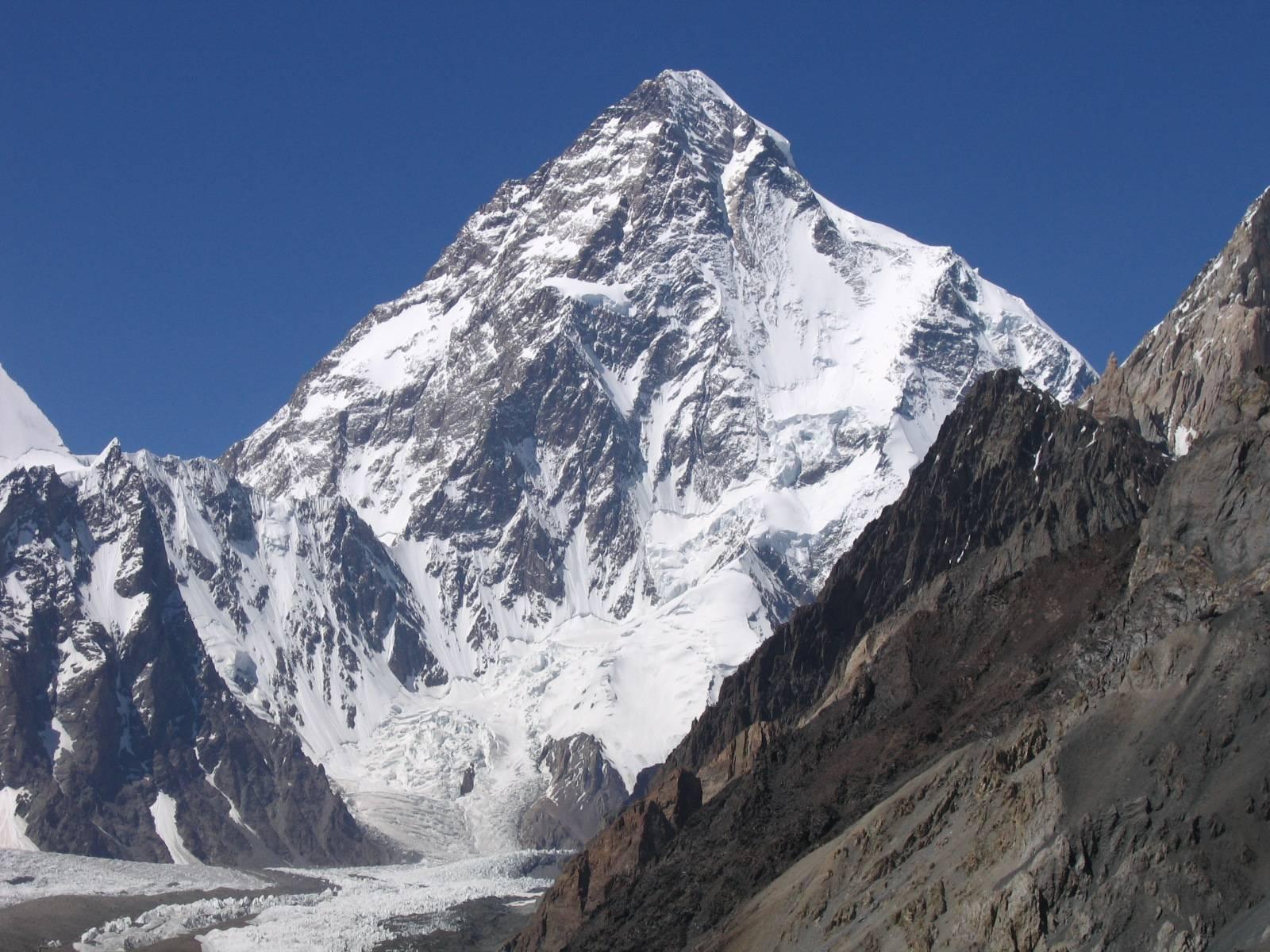
K2, the second-highest mountain on Earth

=== Balochistan ===
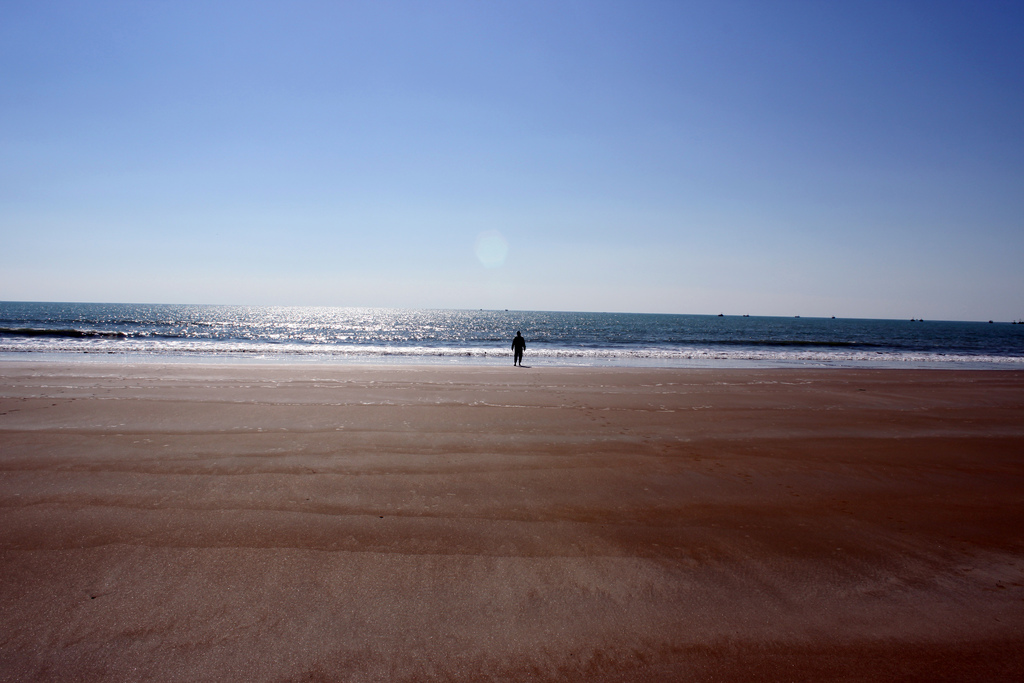
Kund Malir

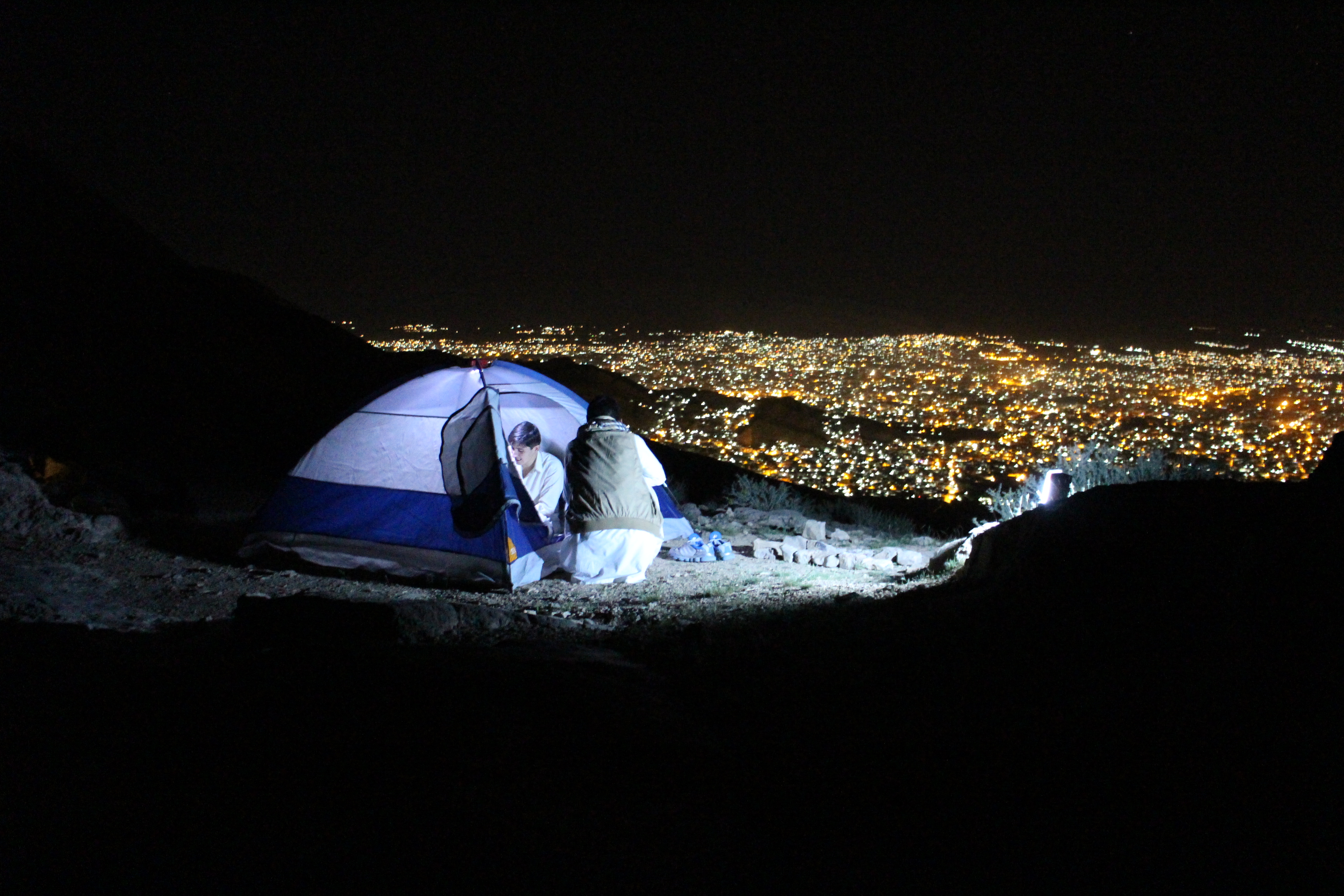
Tourists camped over Quetta

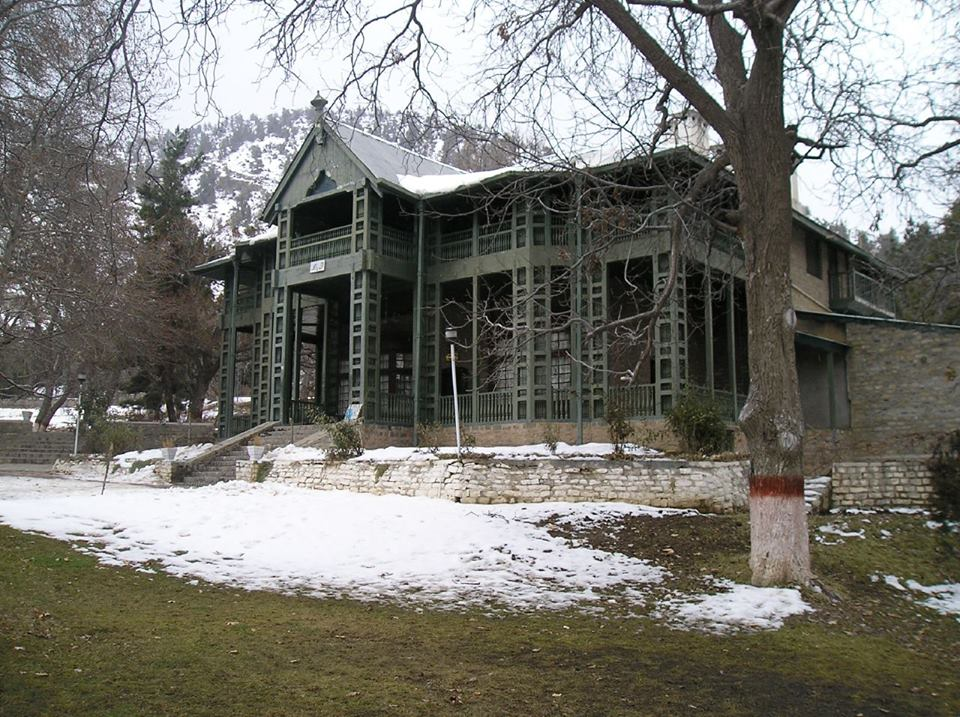
Quaid-e-Azam Residency

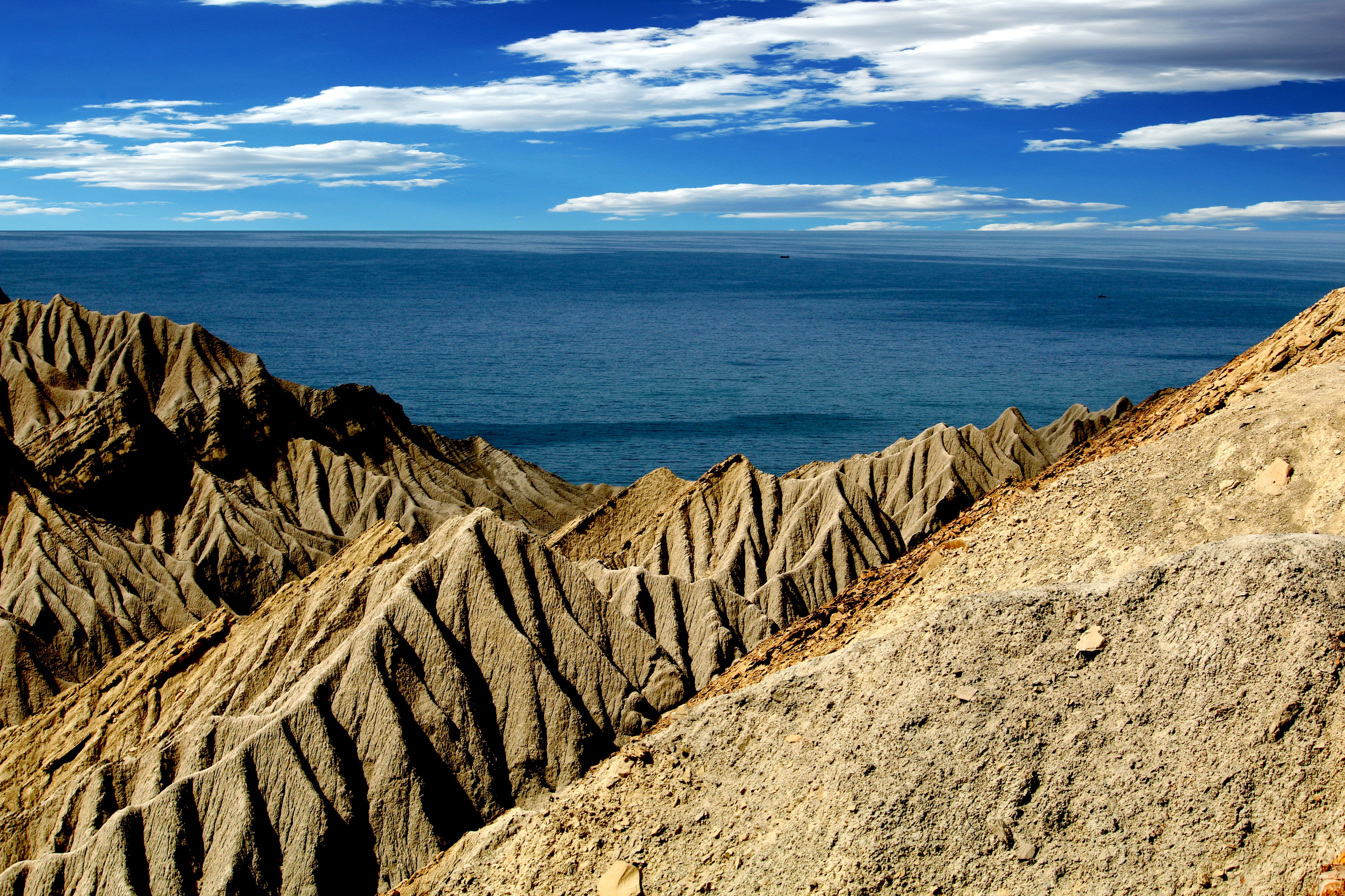
Gwadar

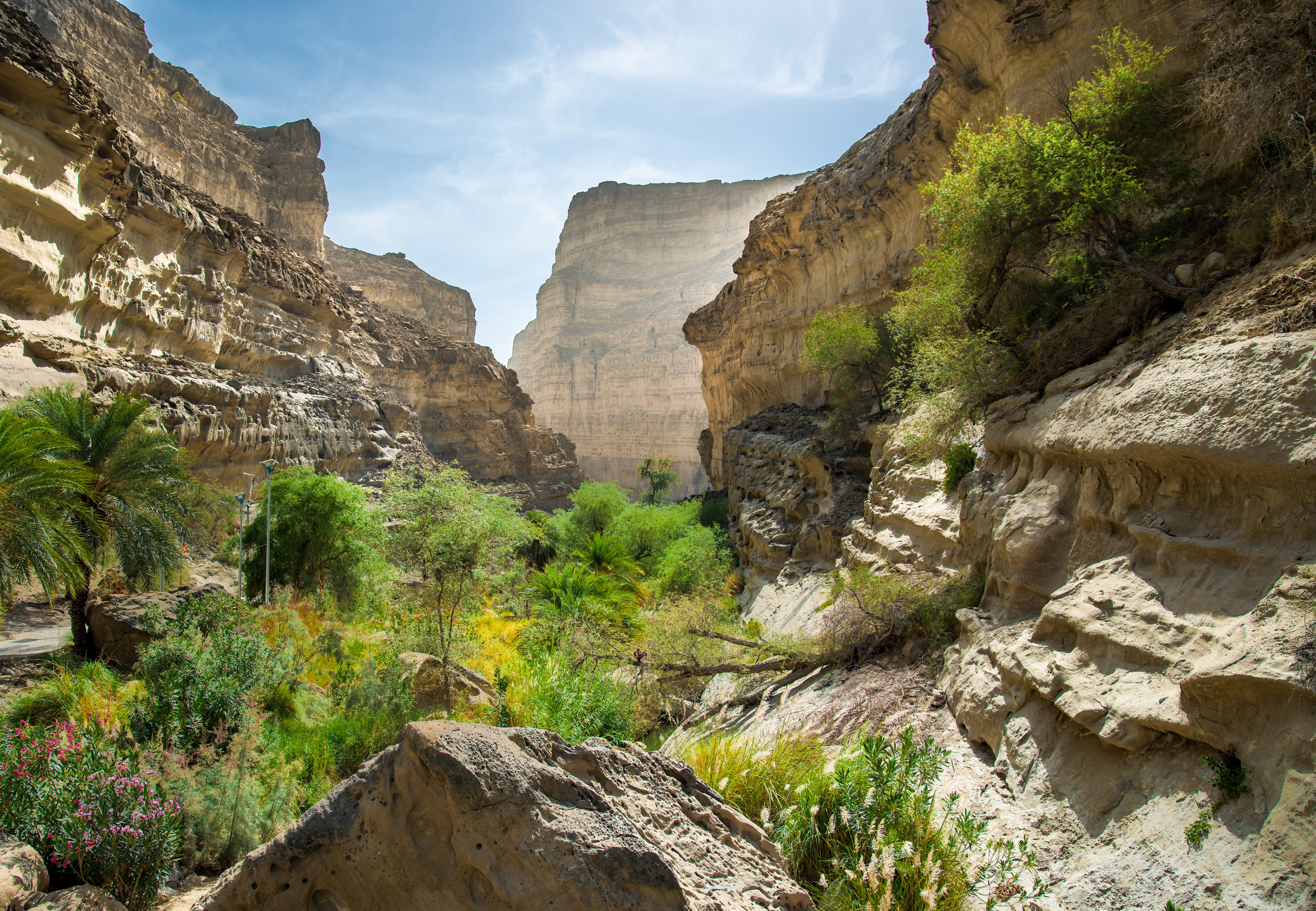
Hingol National Park, Makran

=== Khyber Pakhtunkhwa ===
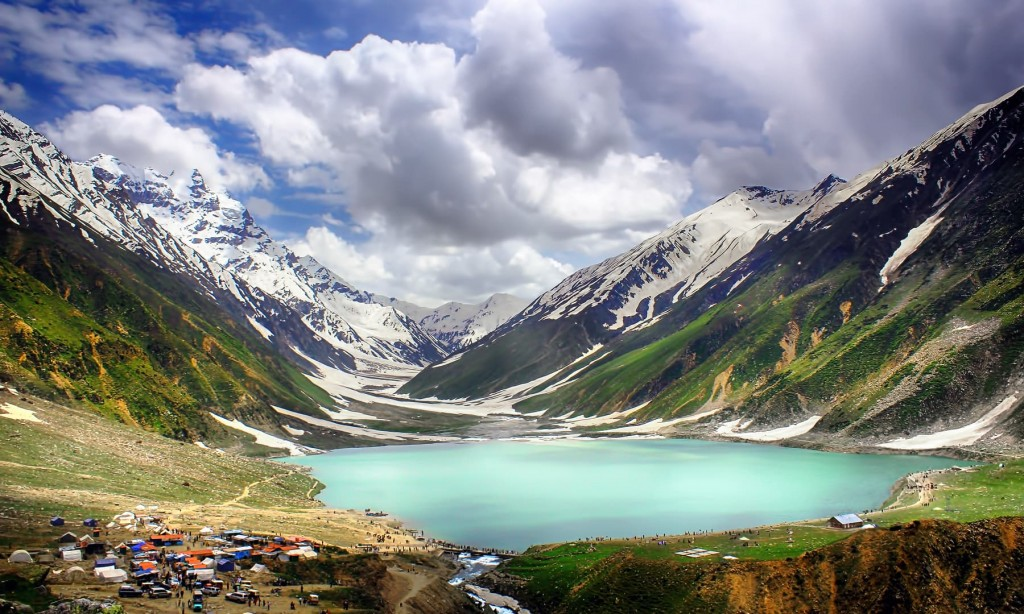
Lake Saiful Muluk, Kaghan Valley

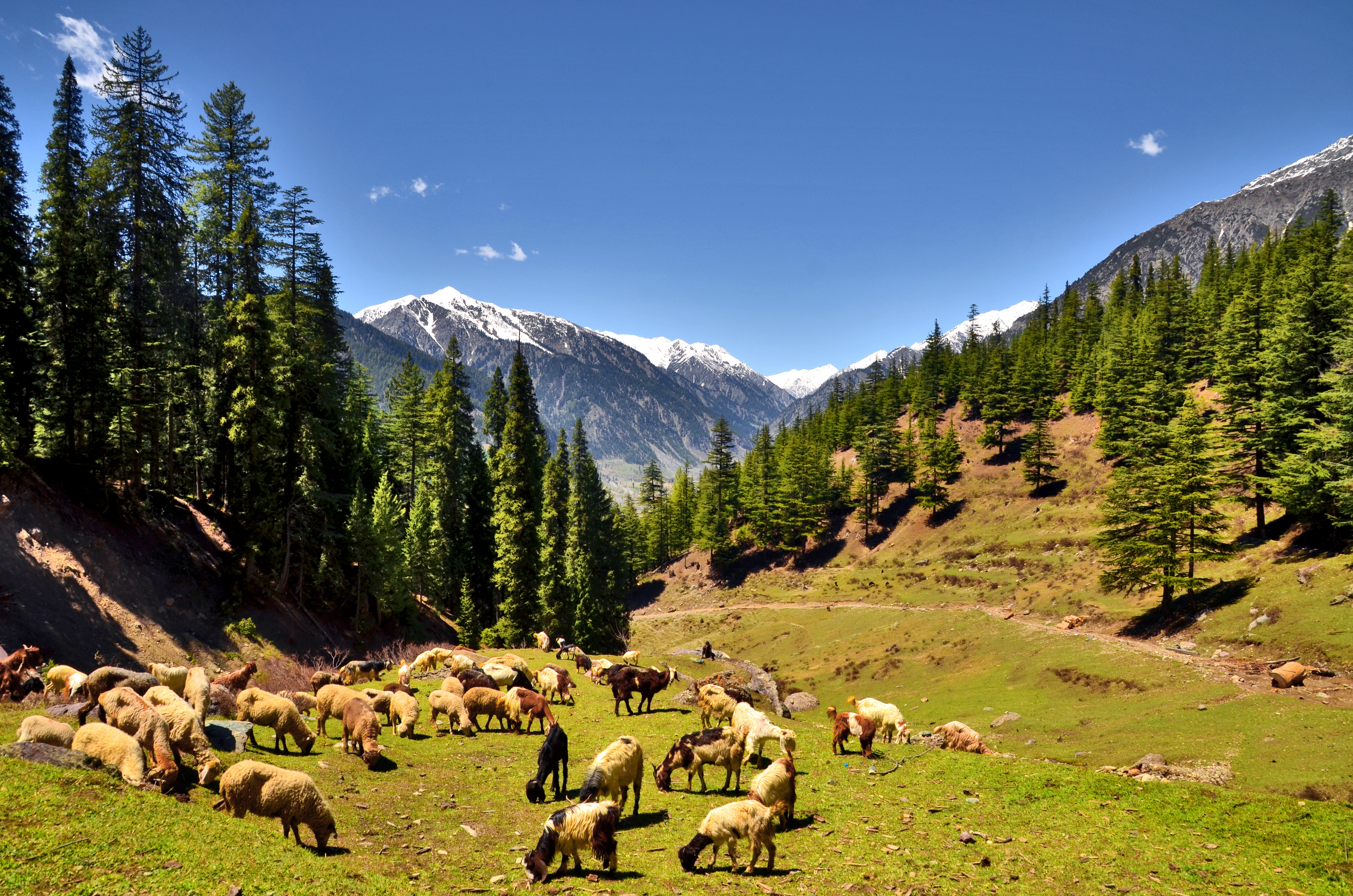
Utror, Swat Valley

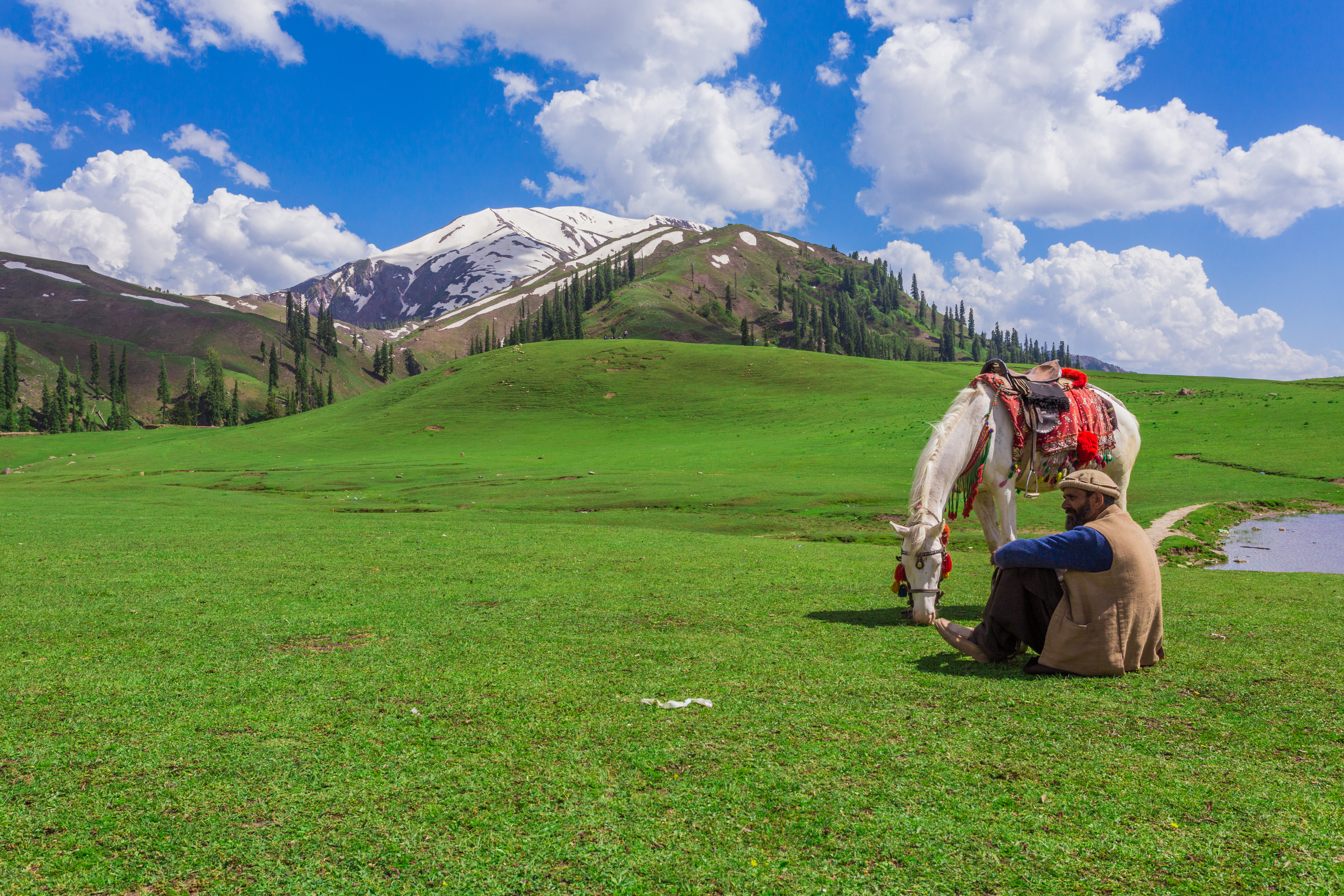
Payee meadows in Shogran

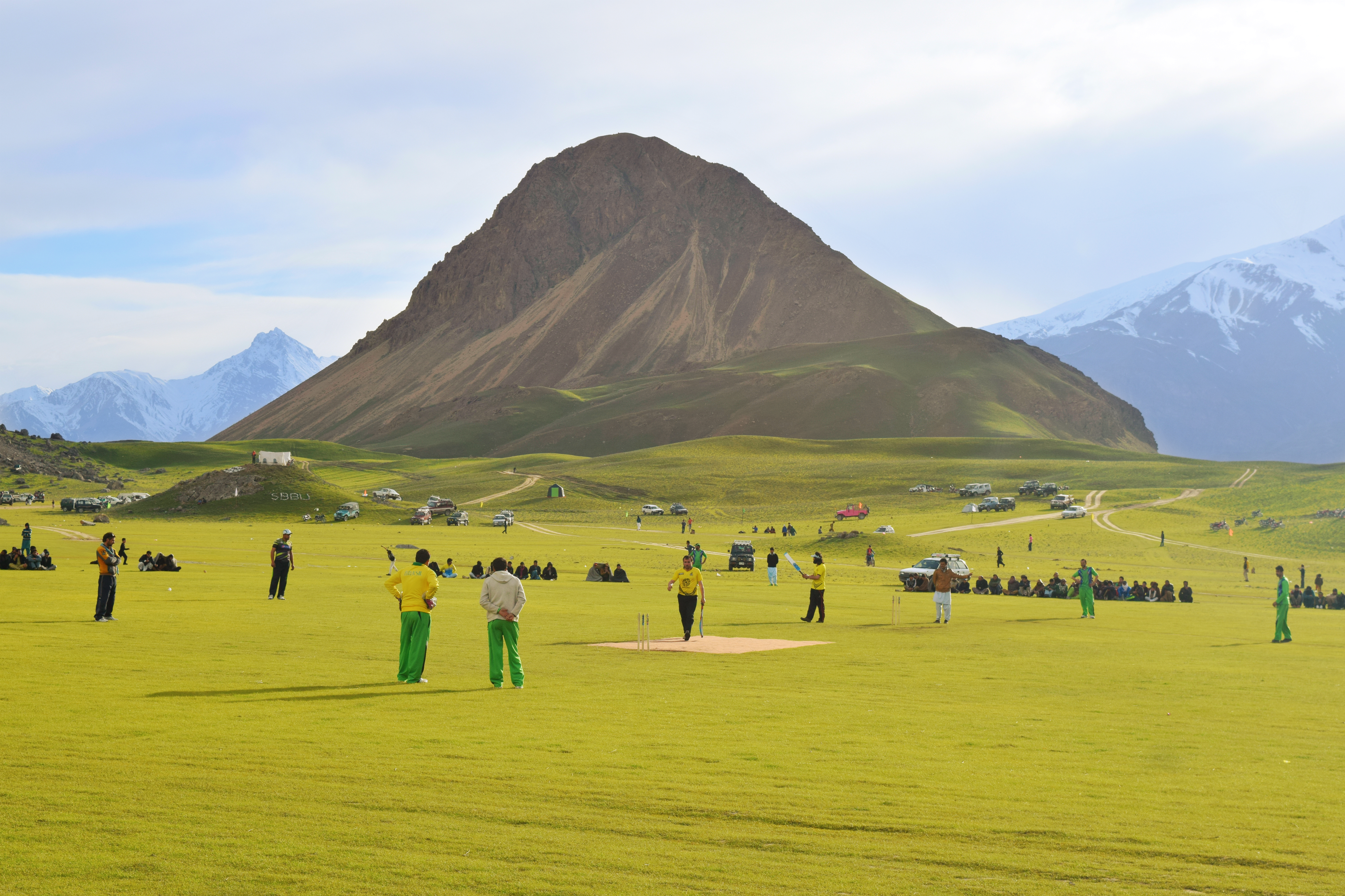
Tourists playing cricket in Chitral

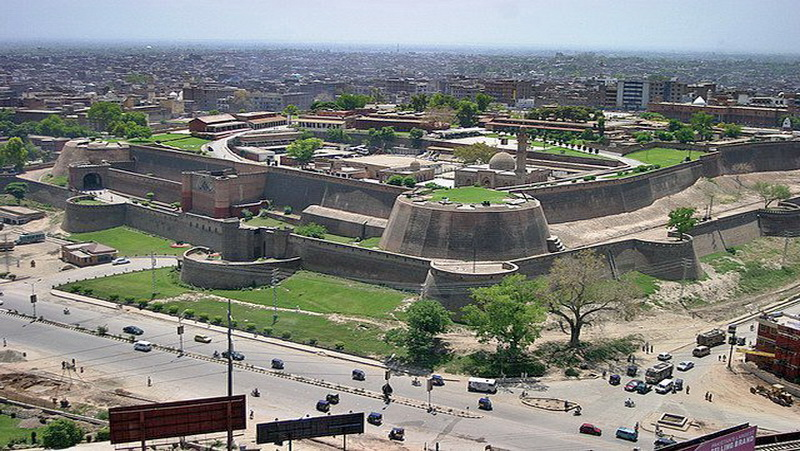
Bala Hissar Fort in Peshawar

=== Punjab ===
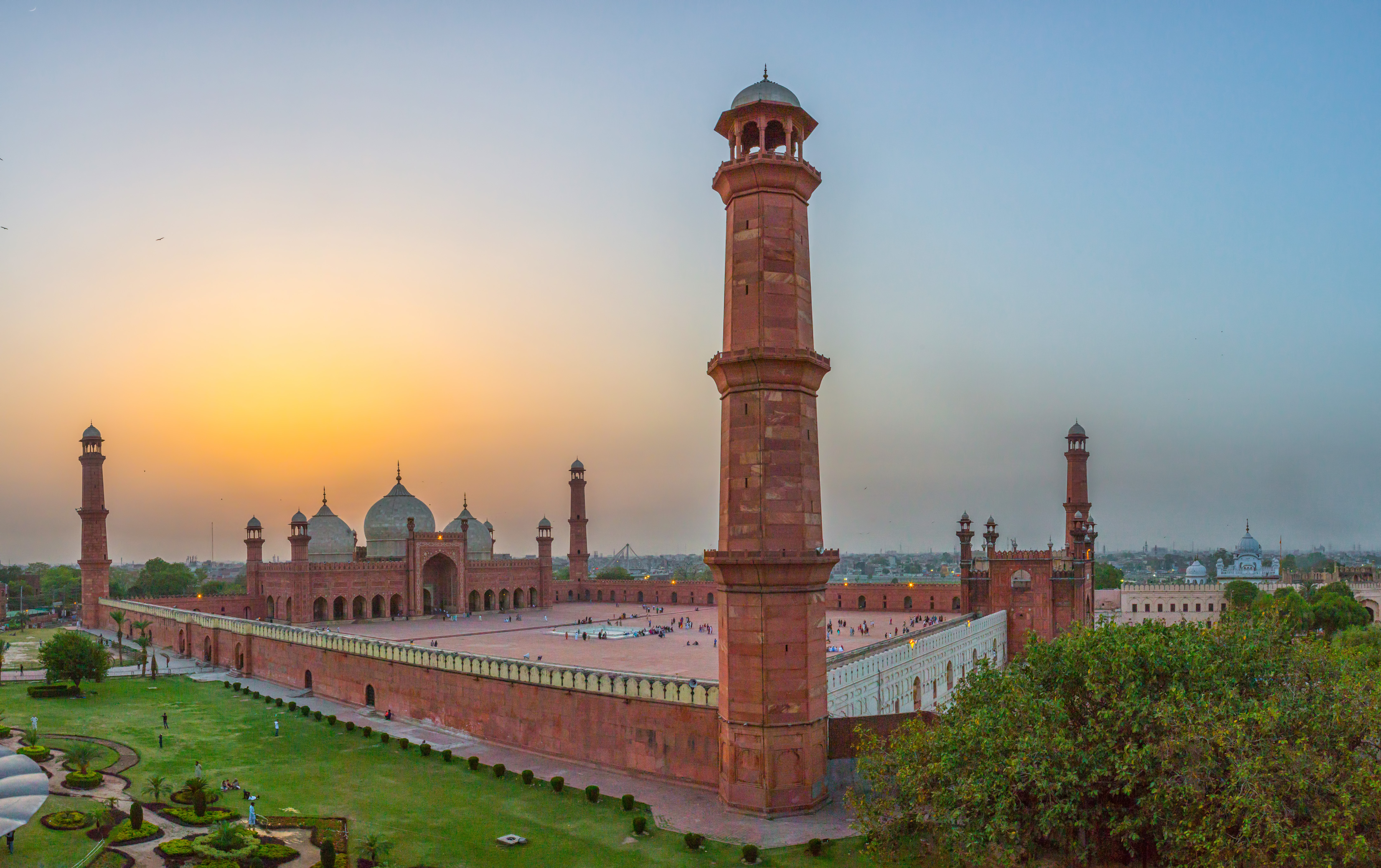
Badshahi Mosque in Lahore

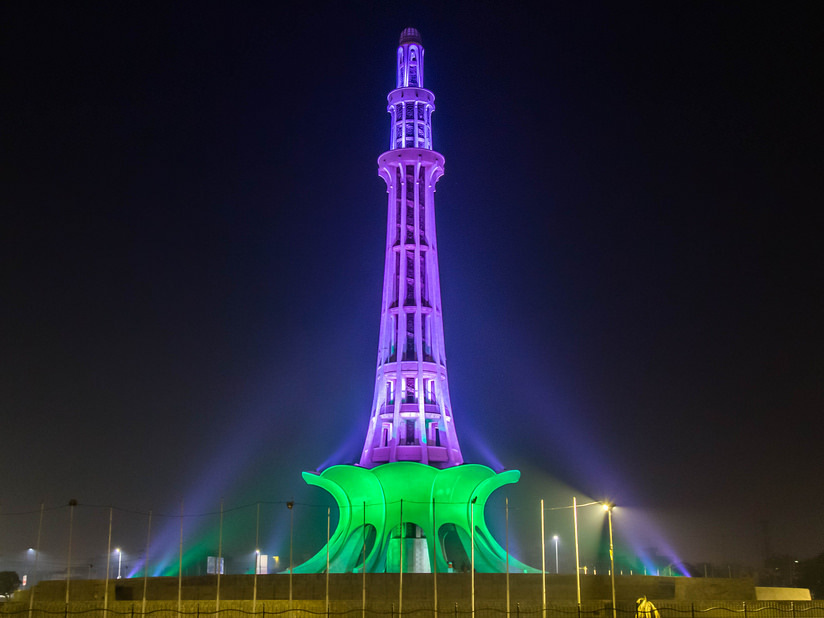
Minar-e-Pakistan, Lahore

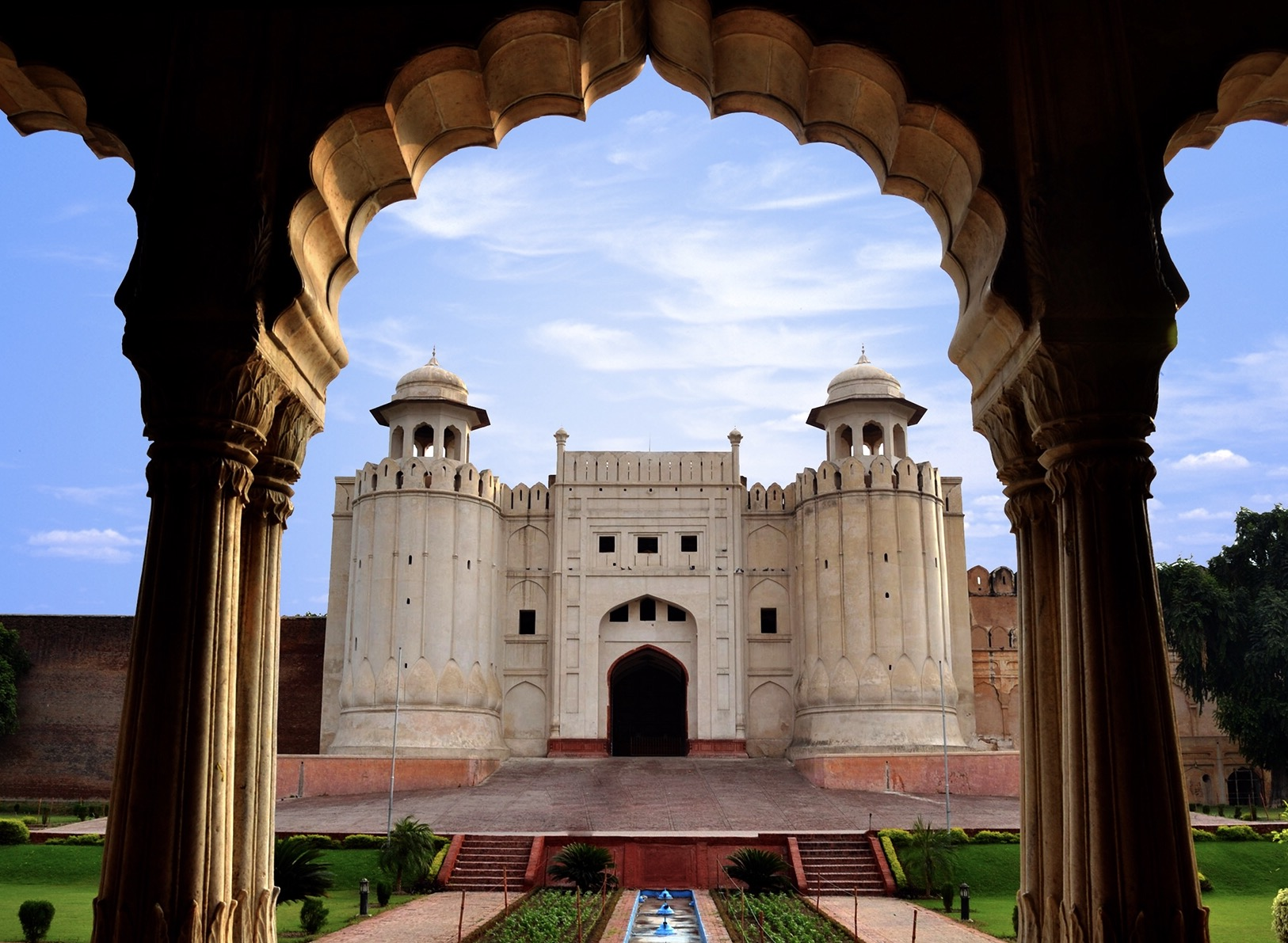
Lahore Fort

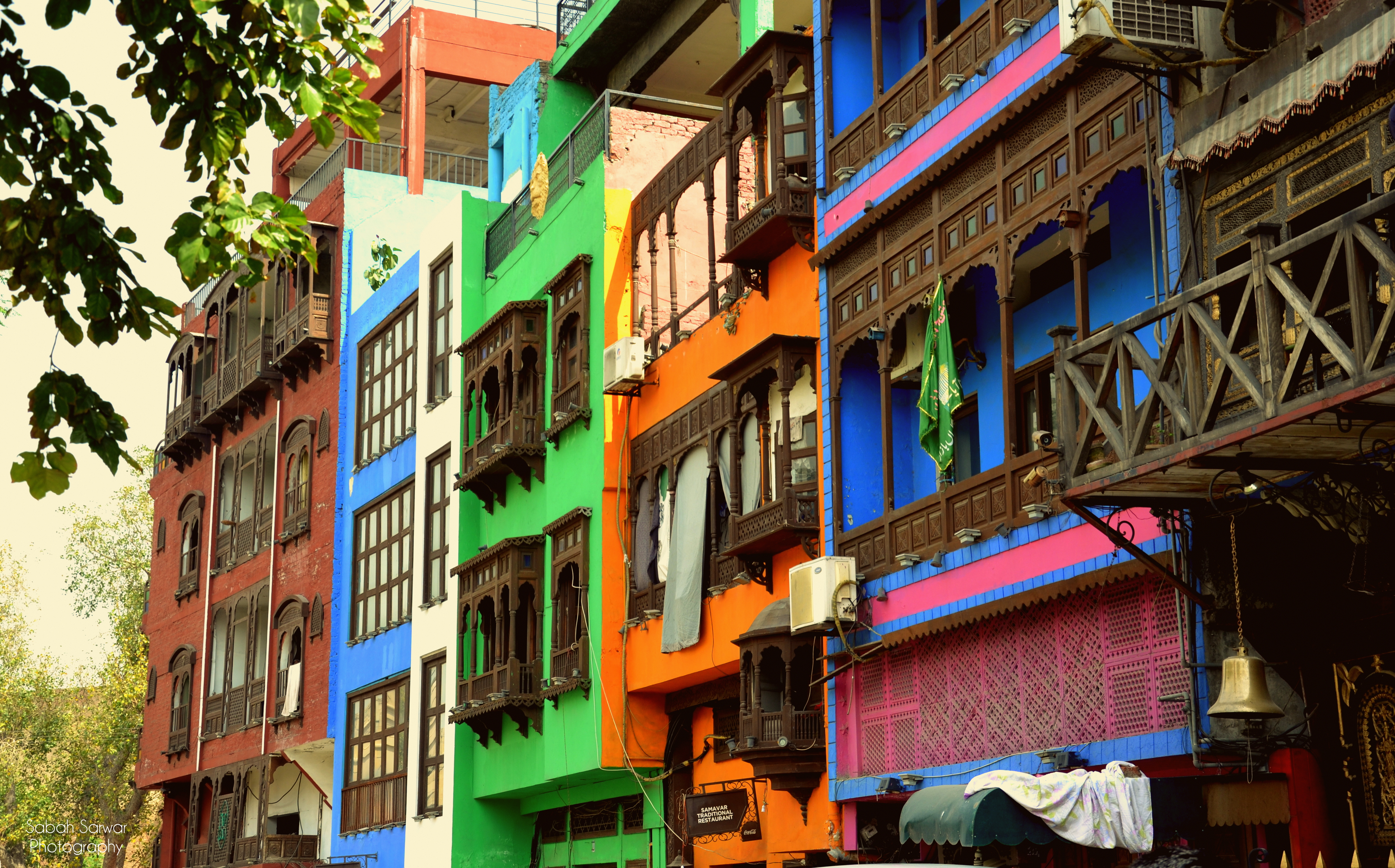
One of the several food streets in Lahore

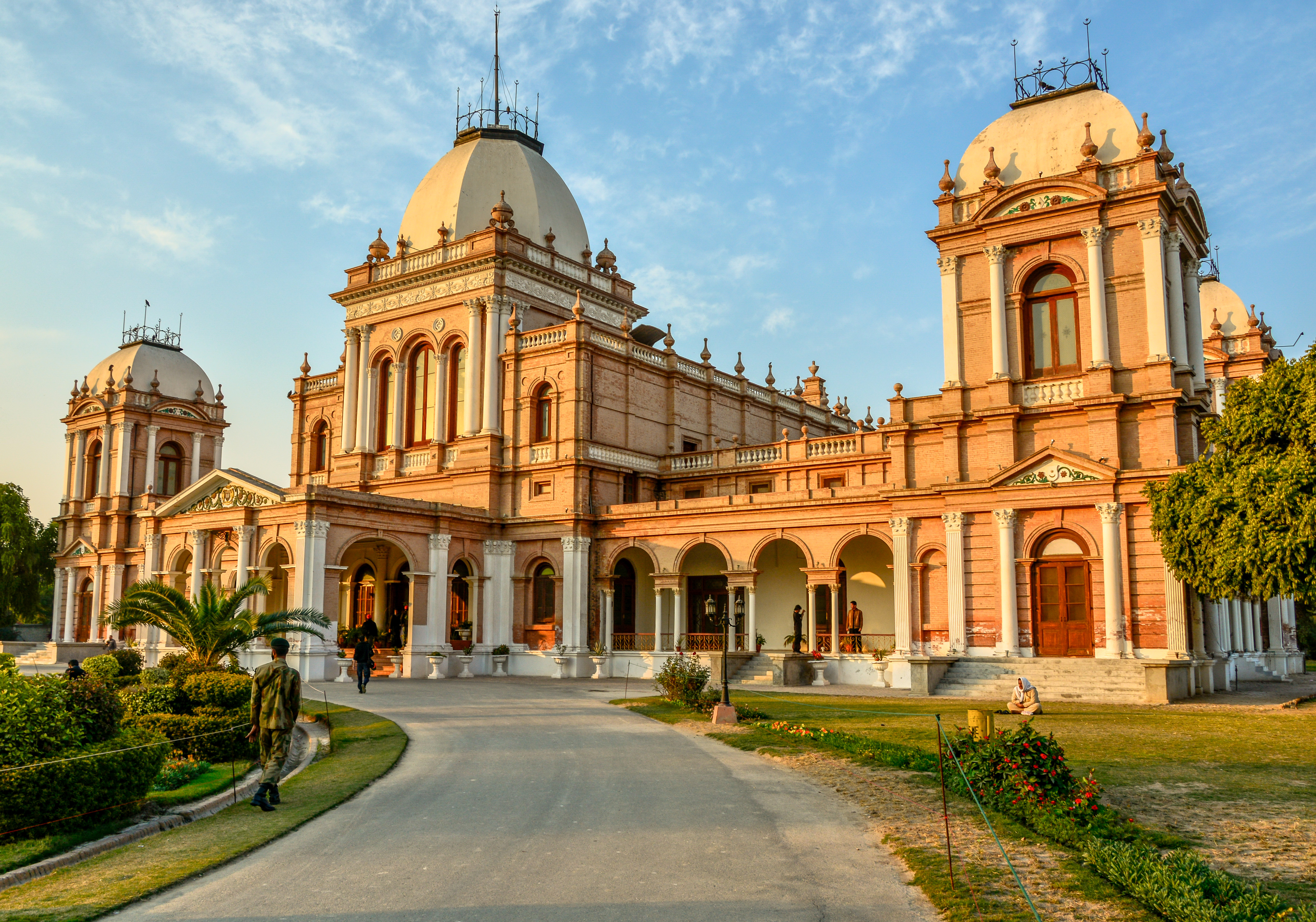
Noor Mahal is a palace in Bahawalpur.

=== Sindh ===
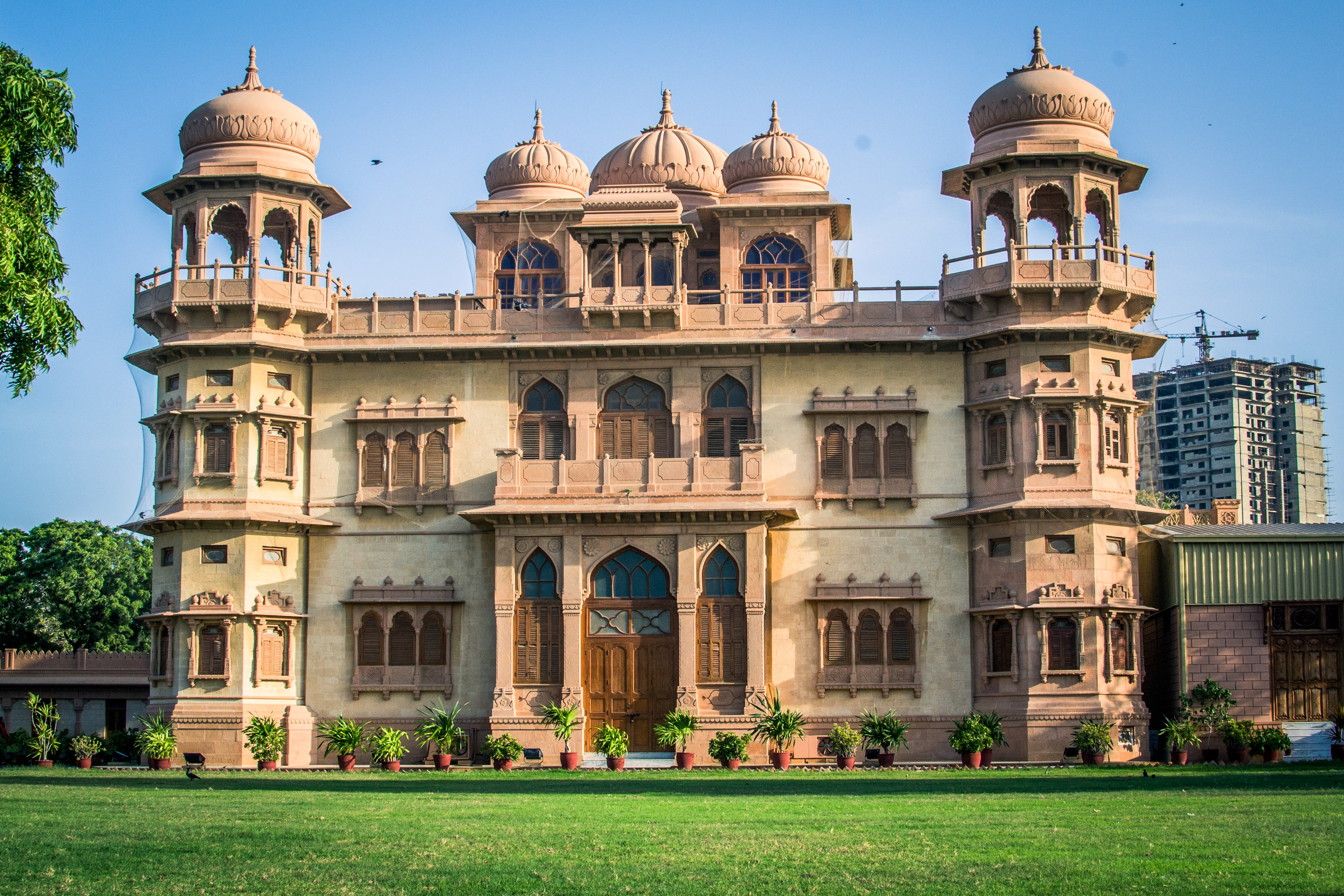
Mohatta Palace in Karachi

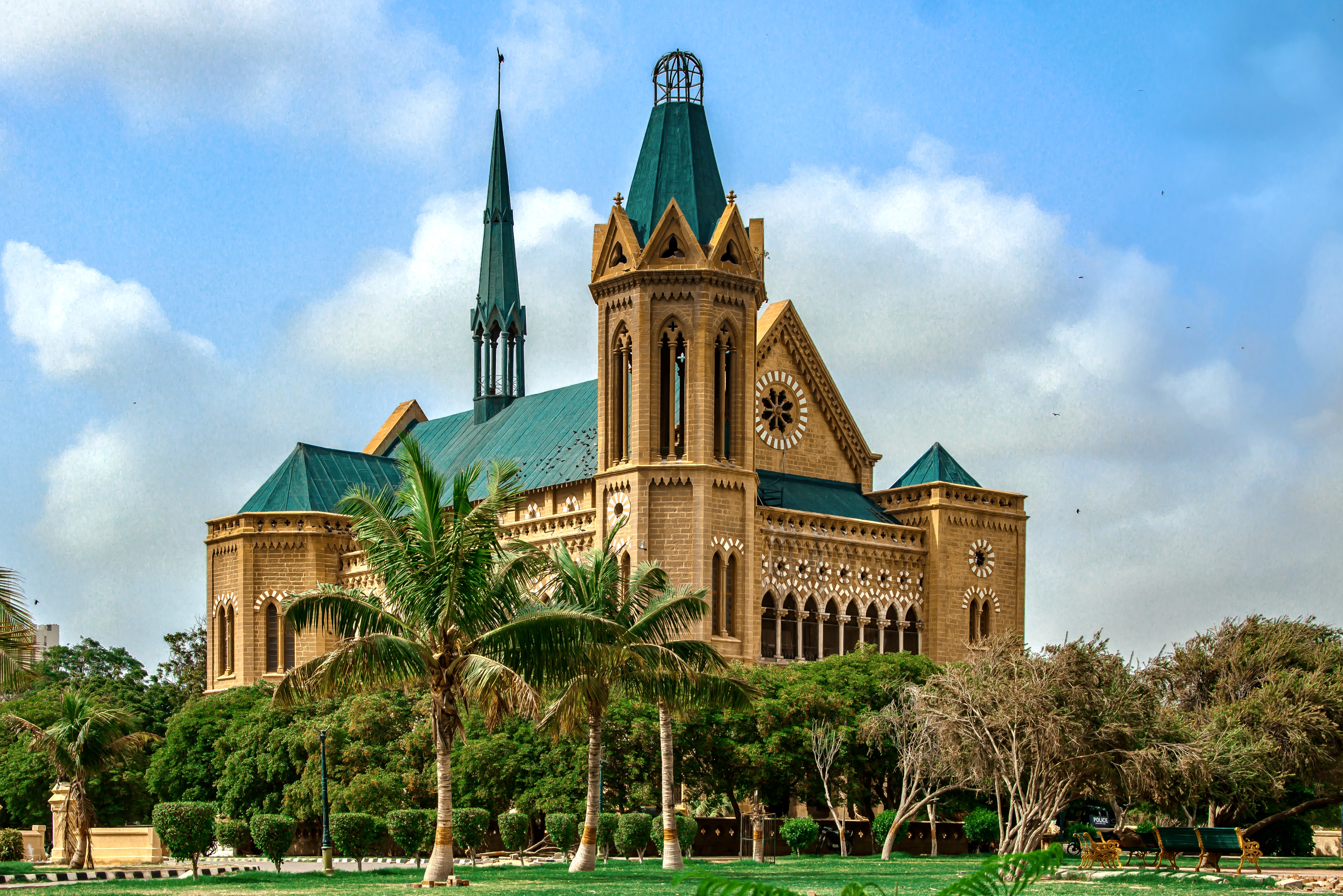
Frere Hall in Karachi

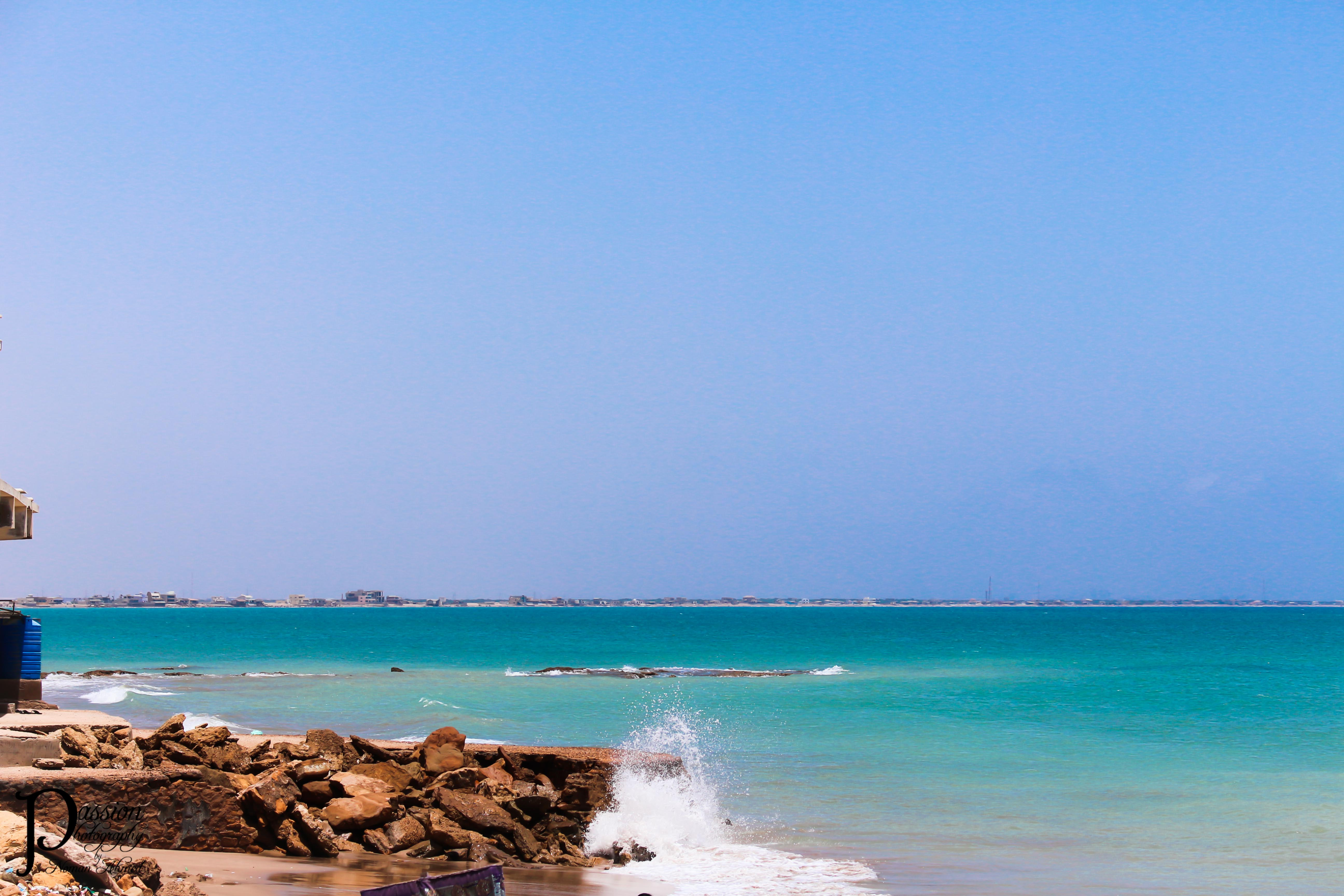
Hawke's Bay Beach, Karachi

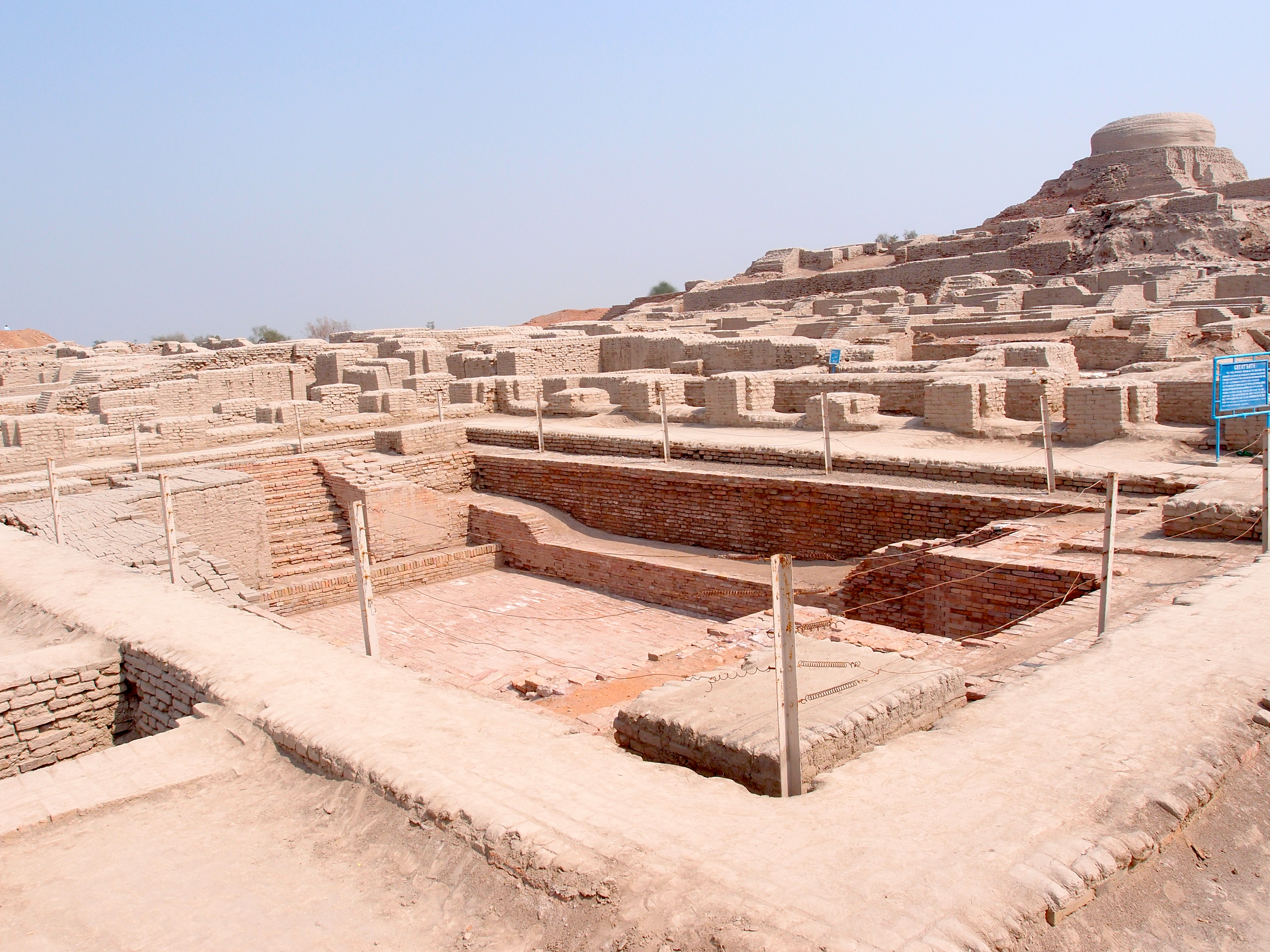
Mohenjo-daro

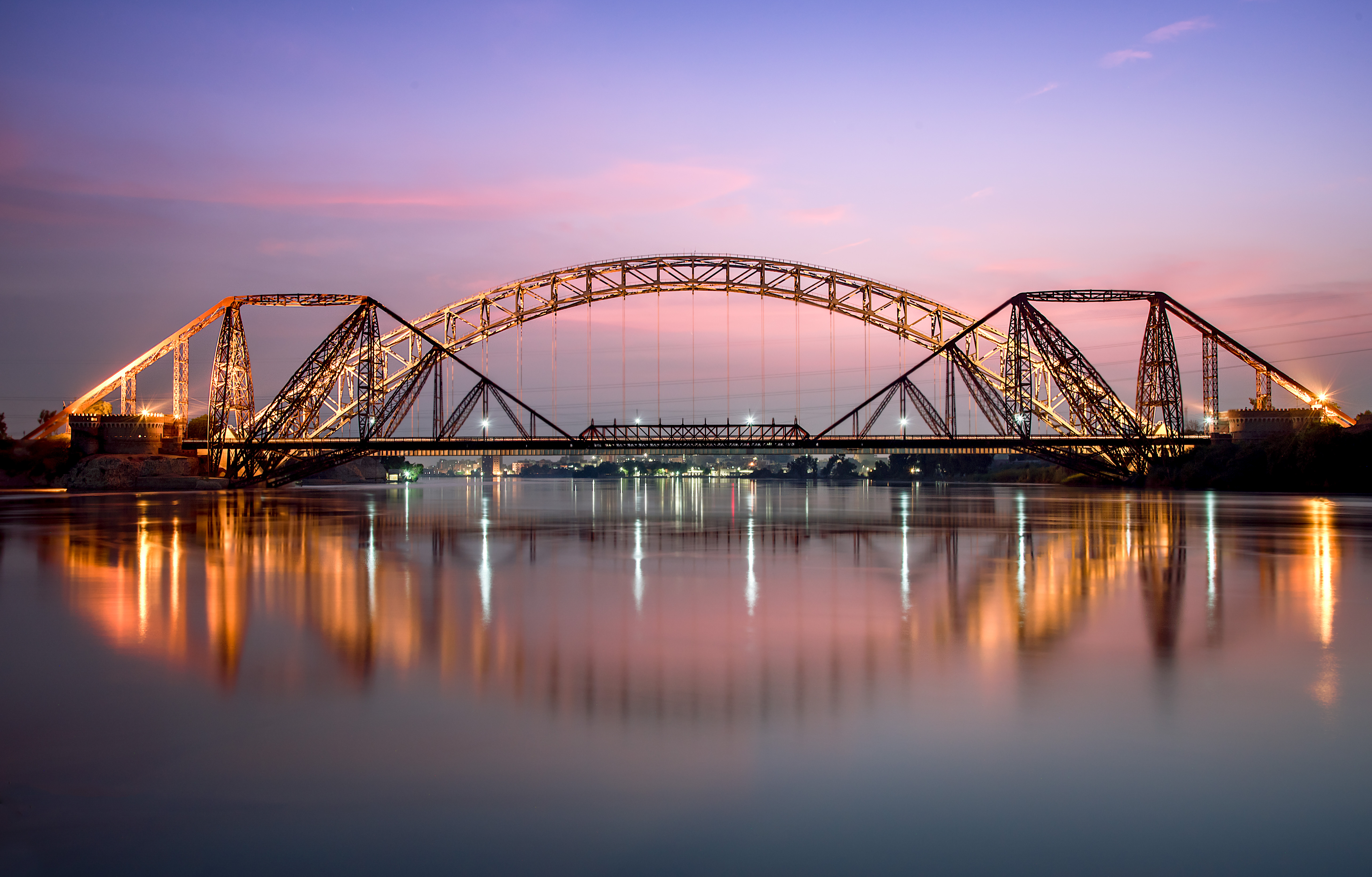
Lansdowne Bridge, Sukkur

=== Azad Kashmir ===
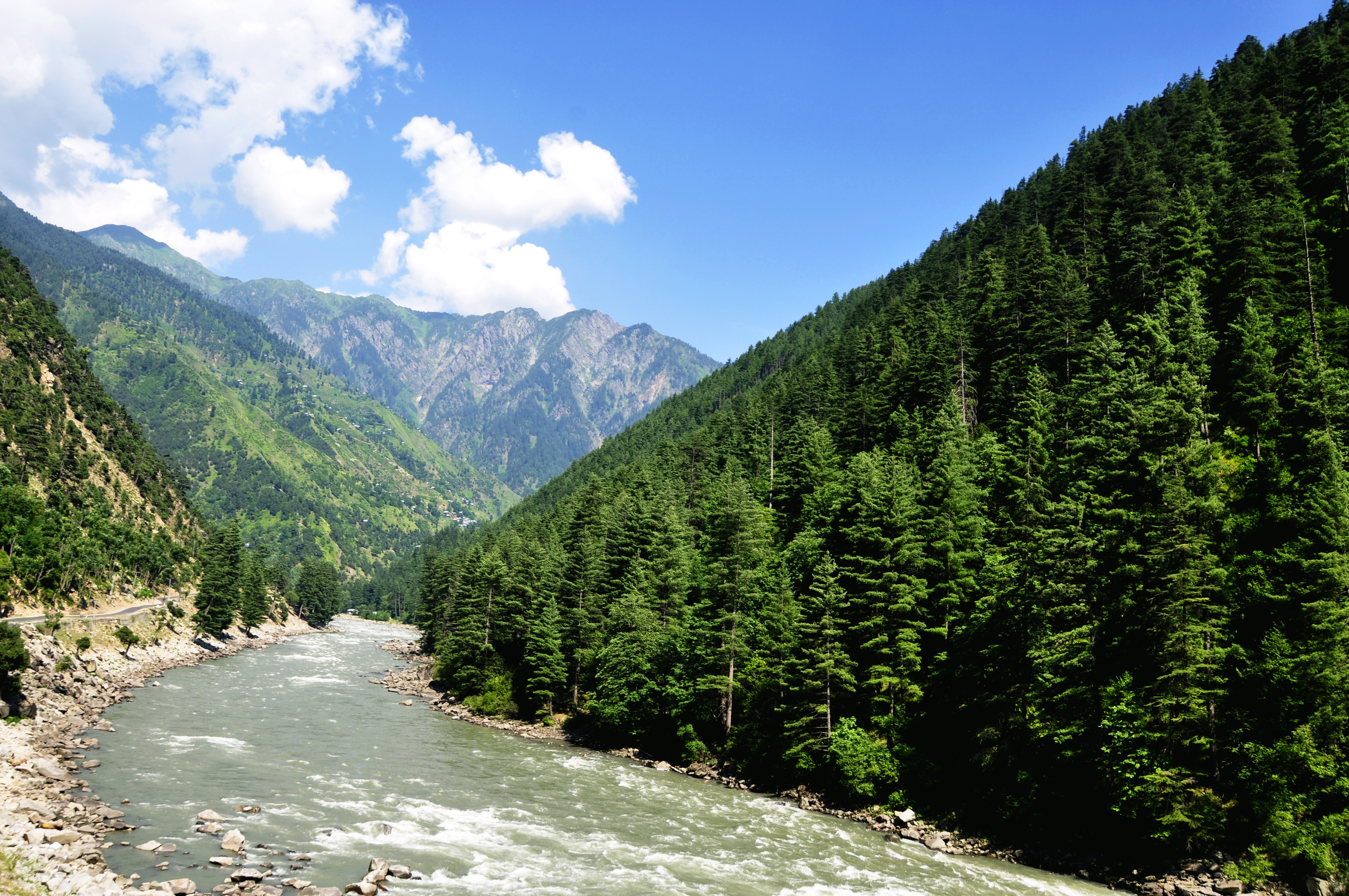
Taobat, Neelum Valley

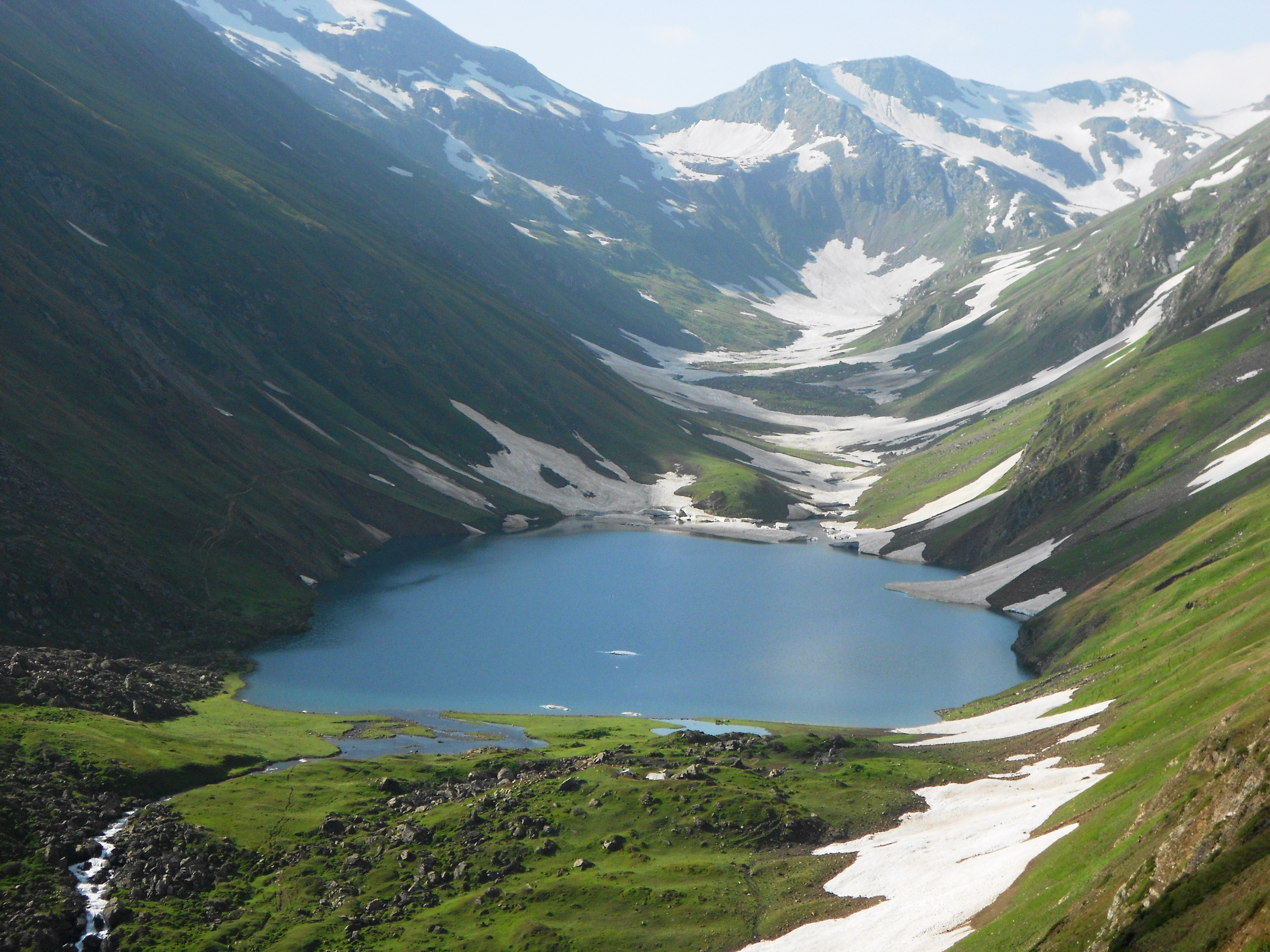
Saral Lake, Neelum Valley

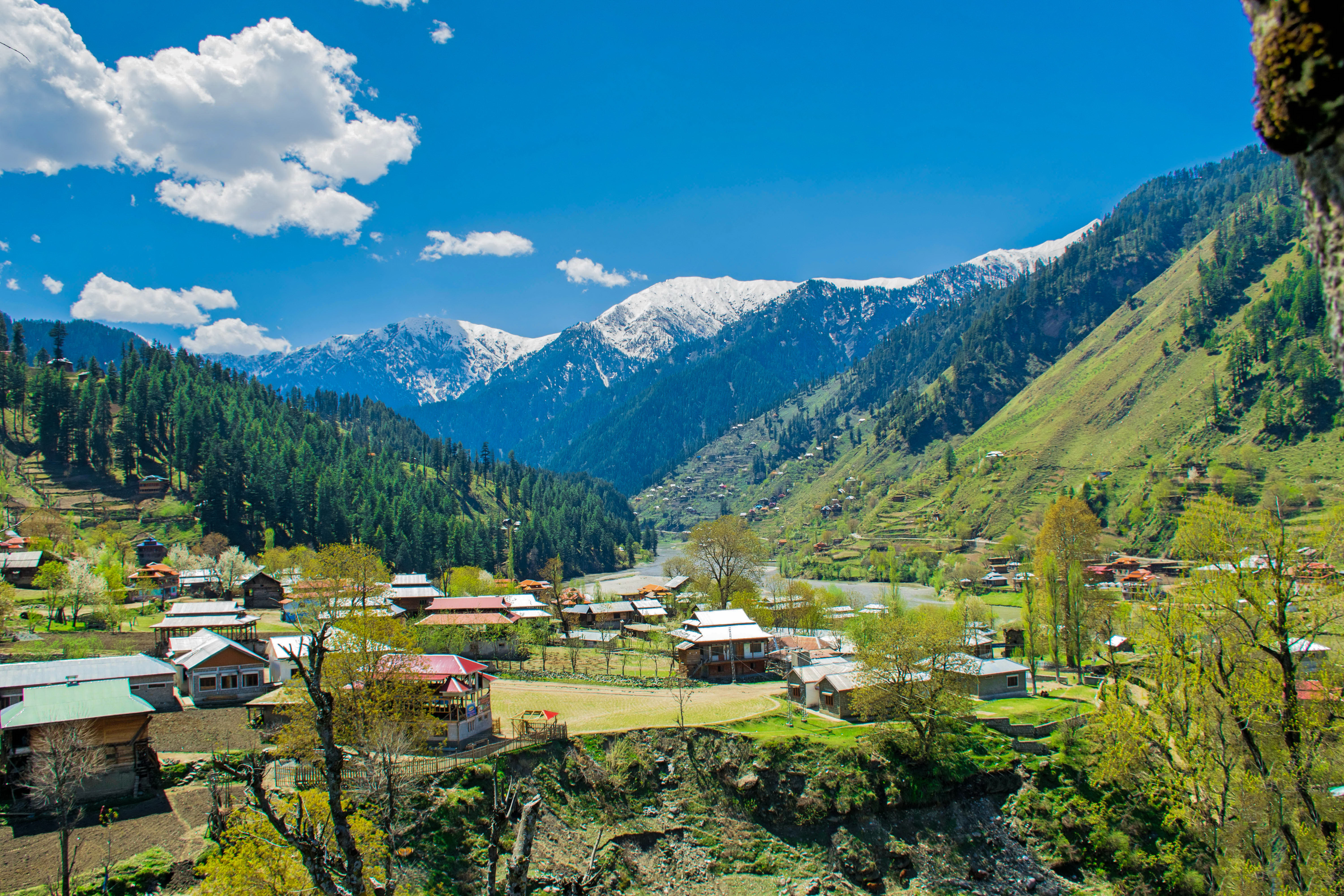
A view of Sharda, Azad Kashmir

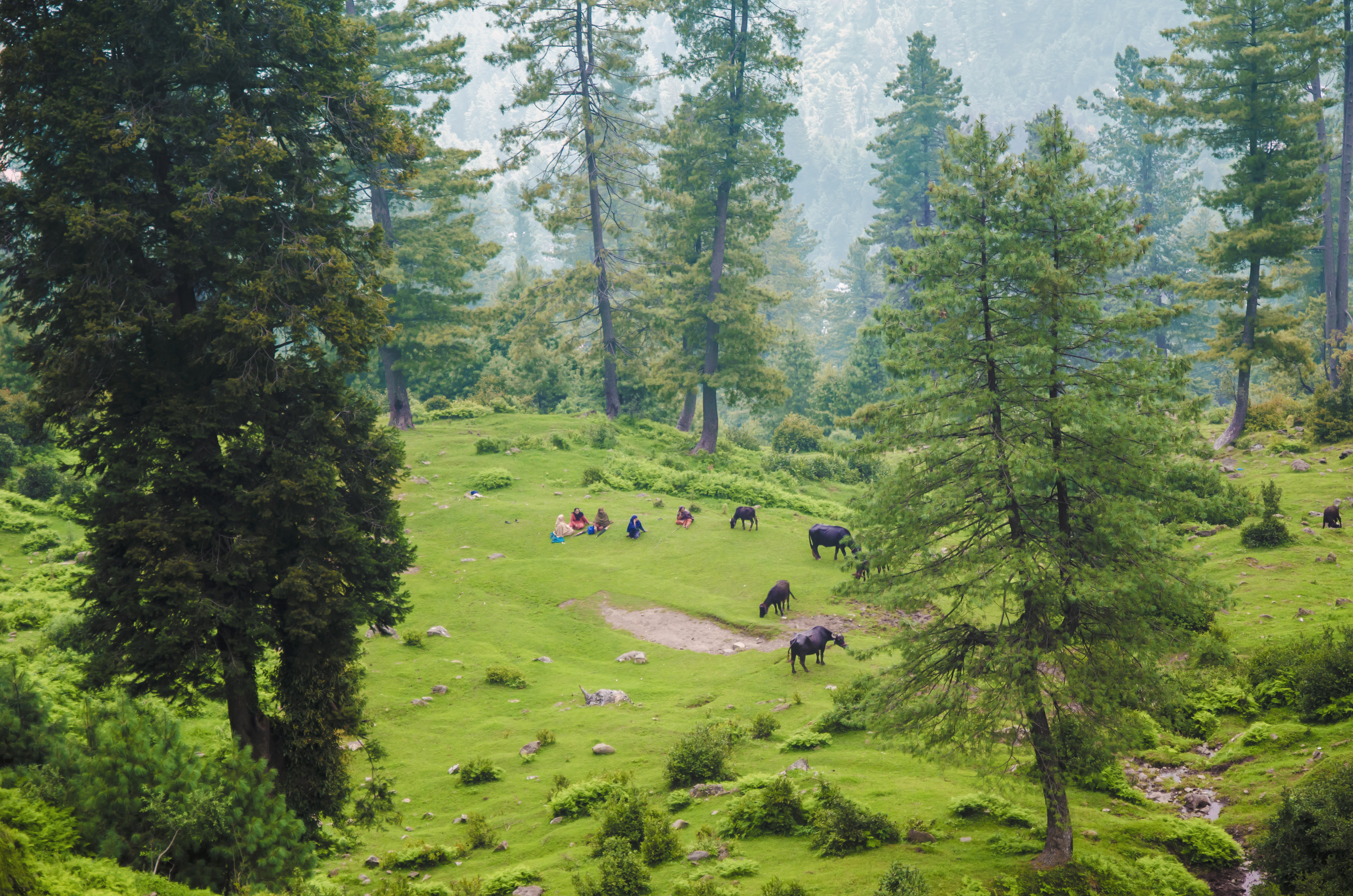
Ganga Choti, Bagh

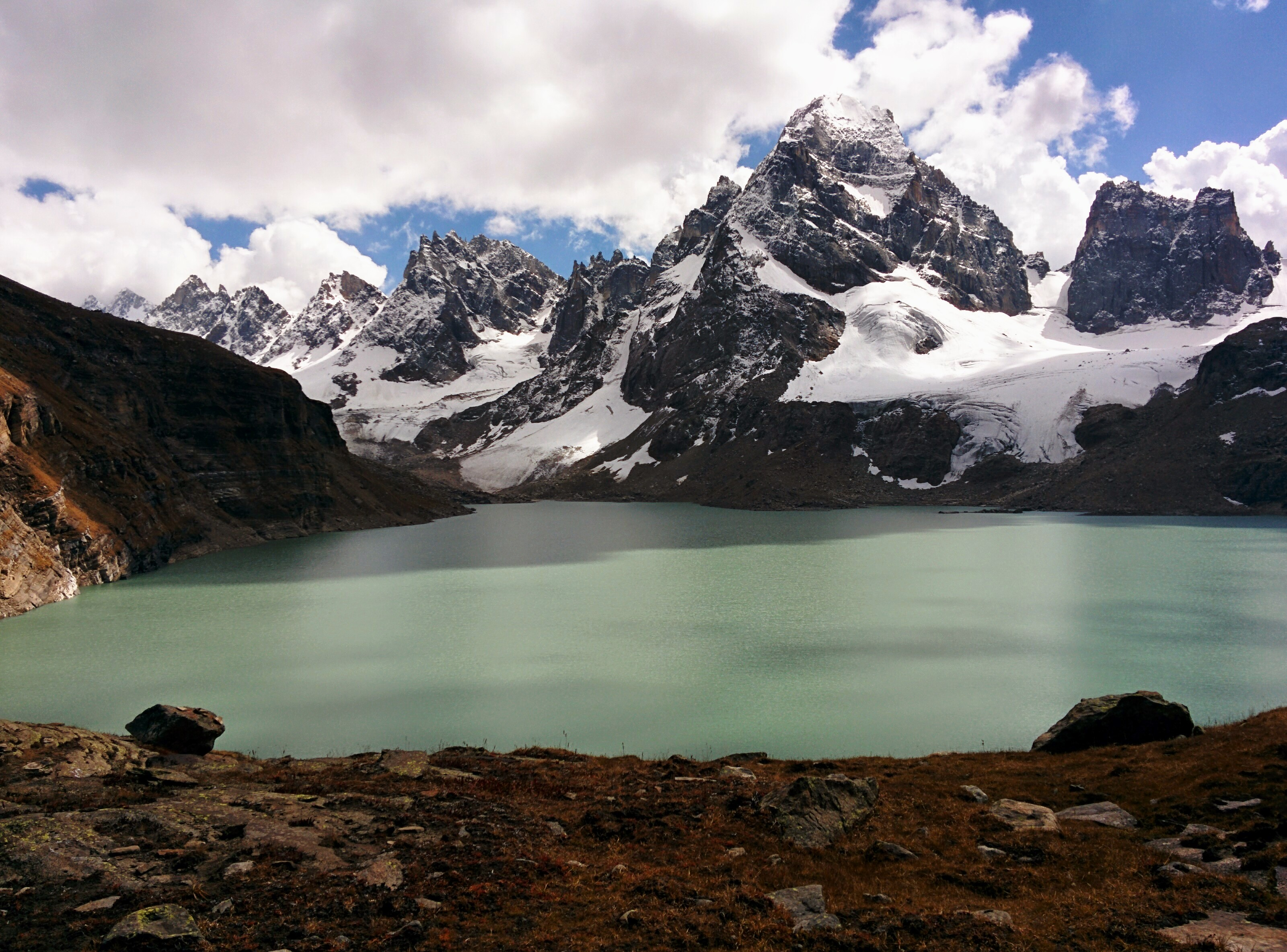
Chitta Katha Lake

=== Islamabad Capital Territory ===
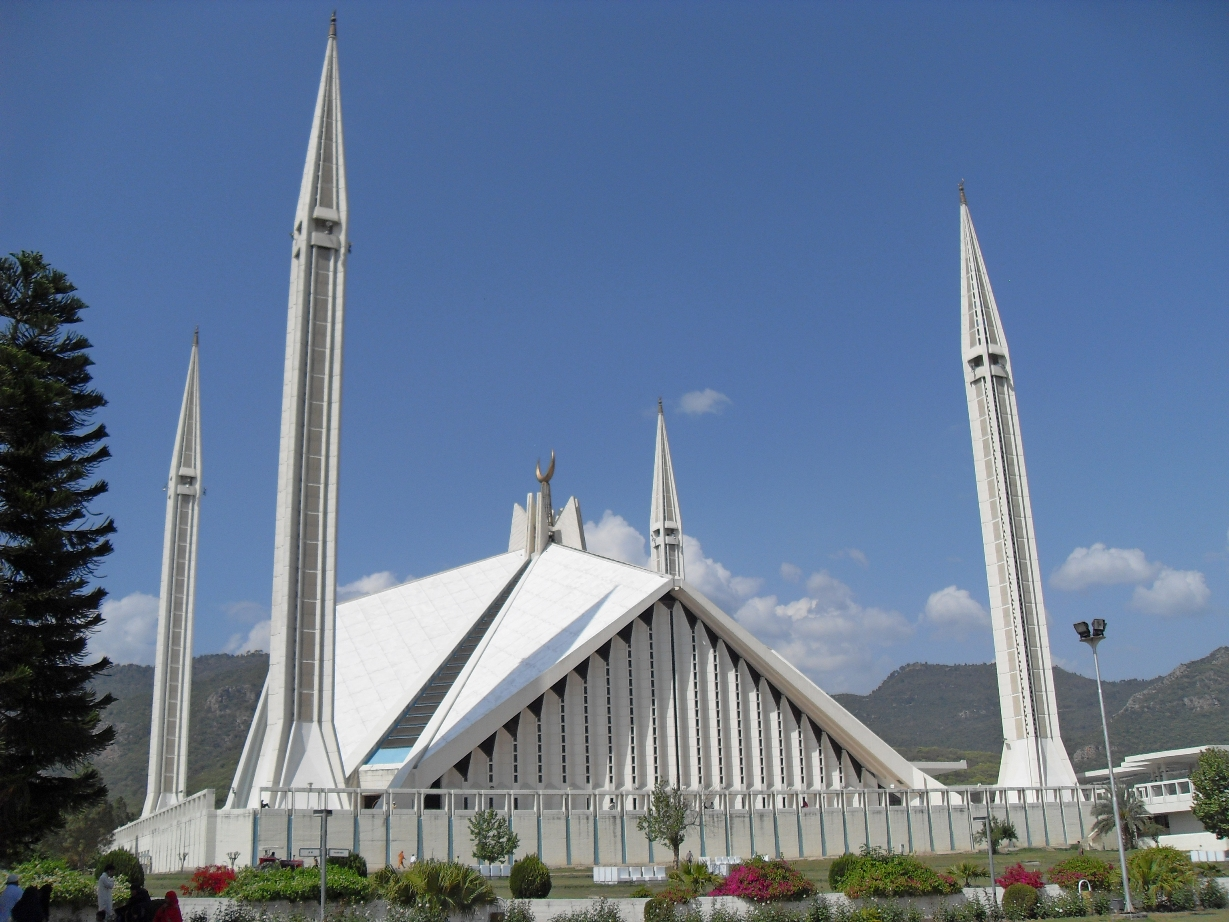
Faisal Mosque, Islamabad

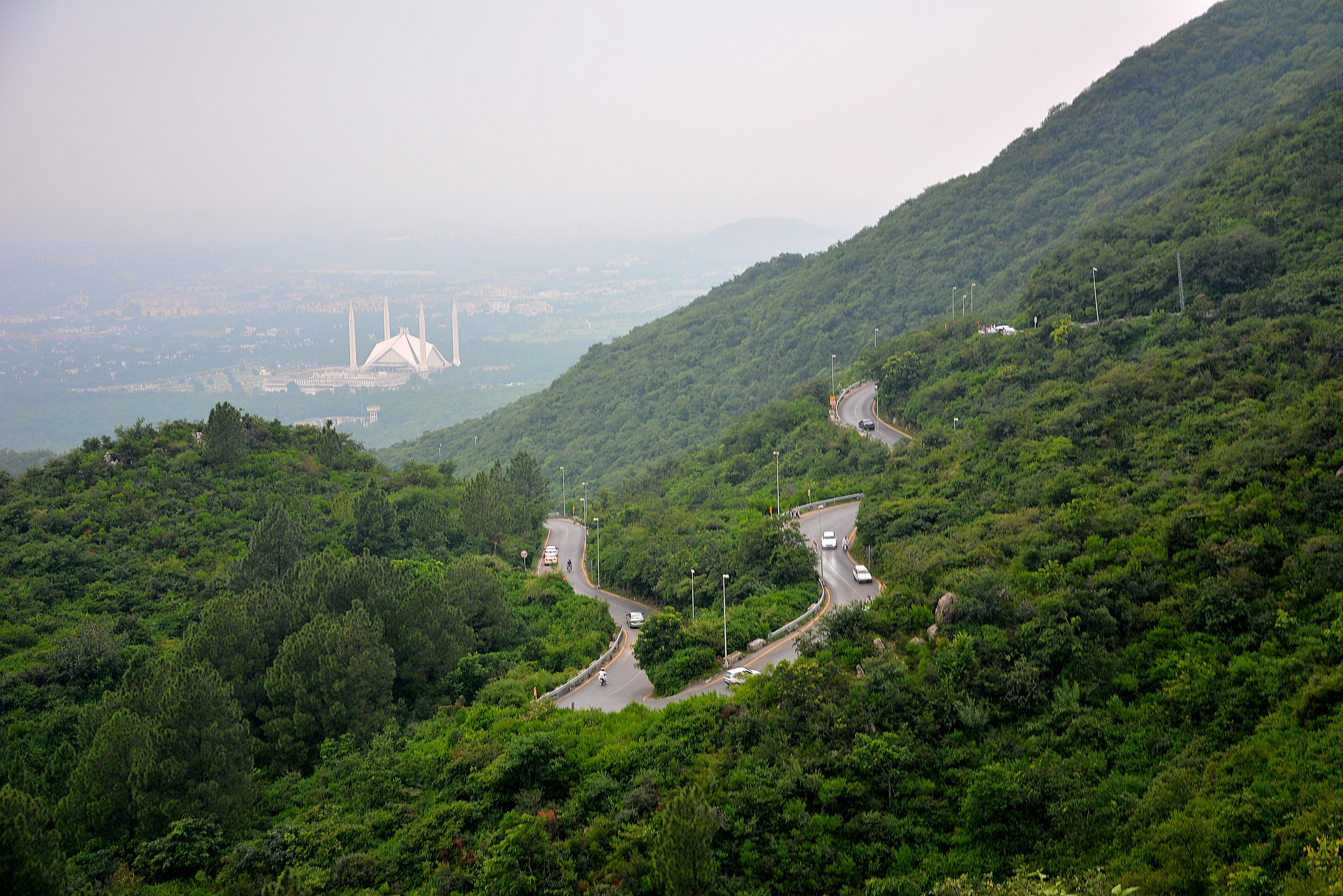
A view of Faisal Mosque, Margalla Hills

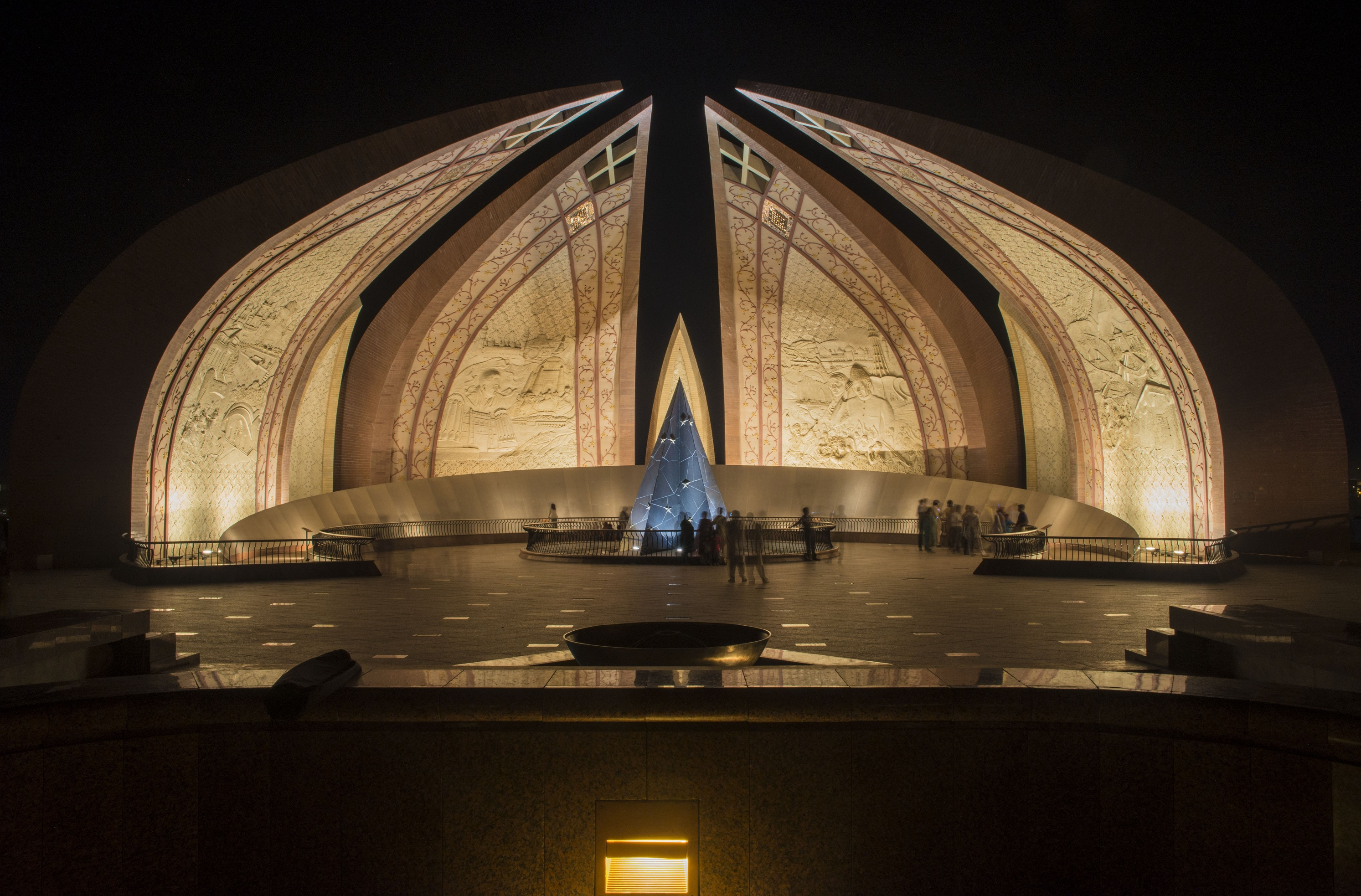
Pakistan Monument

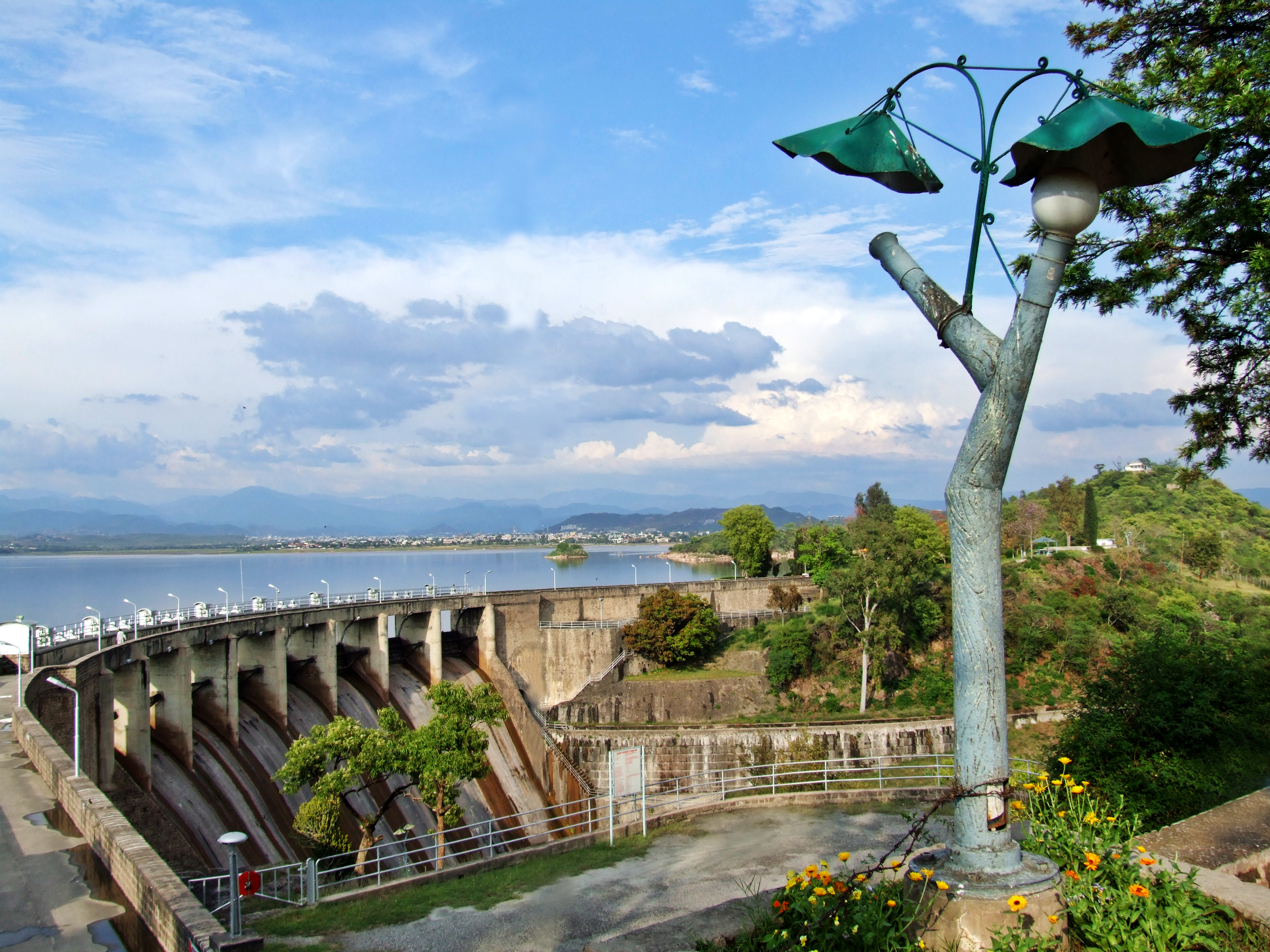
Rawal Dam

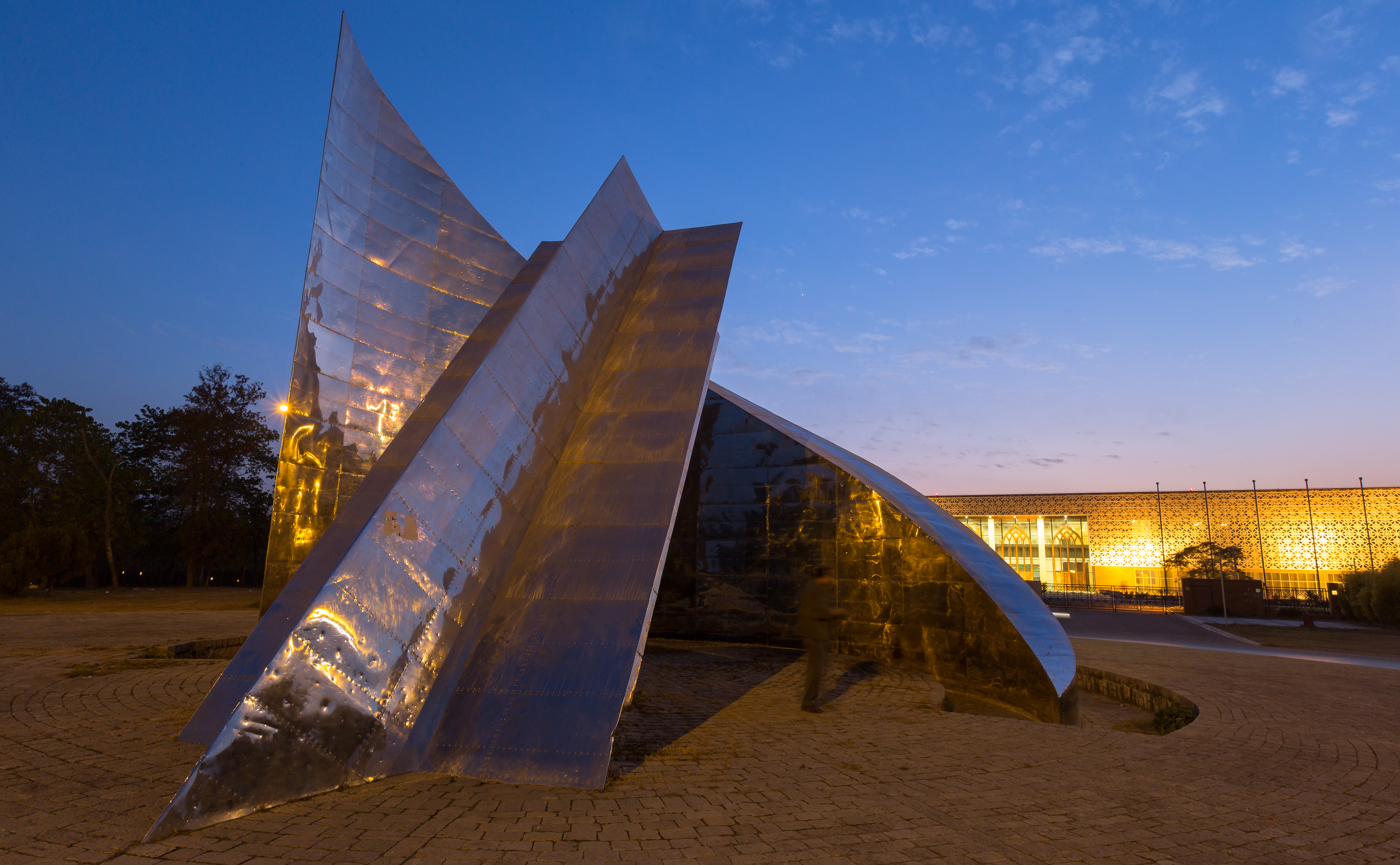
Star and Crescent Monument near the start of Shakarparian

== See also ==
- Hindu pilgrimage sites in Pakistan
- List of Gurdwaras in Pakistan
- Hindu, Jain and Buddhist architectural heritage of Pakistan
- List of cultural heritage sites in Pakistan
- British heritage of Pakistan
- Cuisine of Pakistan
- Culture of Pakistan
- Pakistani architecture
- Wildlife of Pakistan
- Sports in Pakistan
- List of forts in Pakistan
- List of mountains in Pakistan
- List of museums in Pakistan
- List of parks and gardens in Pakistan
- Law enforcement in Pakistan
- List of beaches in Pakistan
- List of deserts of Pakistan
- List of hill stations in Pakistan
- List of islands of Pakistan
- List of rivers of Pakistan
