= Dudipatsar Trail =

Hiking trail in Pakistan

Coordinates: 35°03′08″N 73°56′10″E

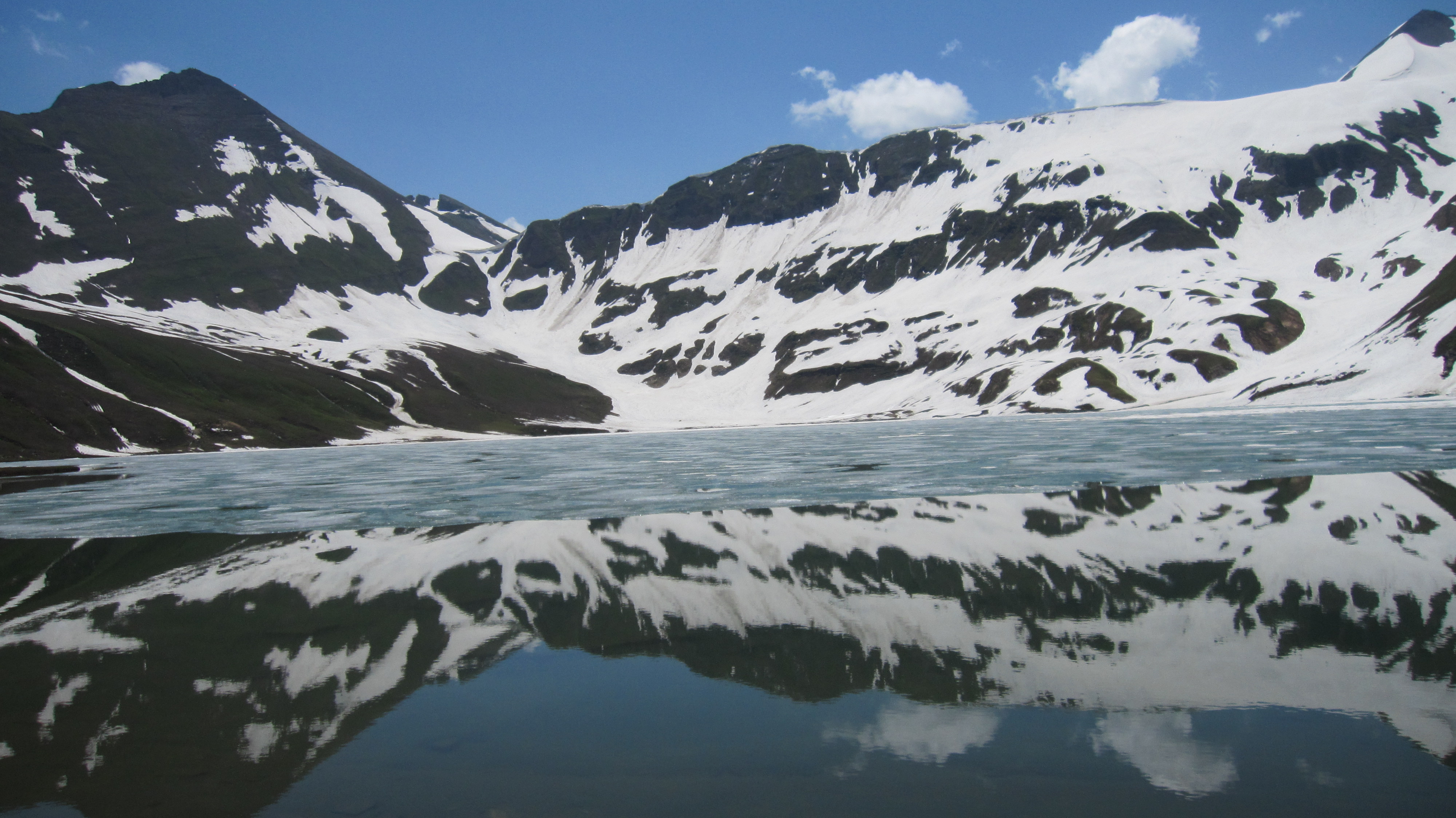
- Final Destination: Dudipatsar (Dudipat Lake)
- Length: 18 km (11 mi)
- Location: Lulusar-Dudipatsar National Park, Khyber Pakhtunkhwa, Pakistan
- Trailheads: Besal
- Use: Hiking
- Elevation gain/loss: 640 metres (2,100 ft) gain approximately
- Highest point: Dudipat Lake ridge, 3,900 m (12,800 ft)
- Lowest point: Besal, 3,250 m (10,660 ft)
- Season: Summer to early fall
- Months: Mid-June through late September

The Dudipatsar Trail is an approximately 18 km (11 mi) hiking trail in the Lulusar-Dudipatsar National Park of Khyber-Pakhtunkhwa, in northern Pakistan. The trail goes along a tributary of the Kunhar River called Poorbi Narr in the northern Kaghan Valley. The headwater for the particular tributary is the Dudipat Lake and the trail has a cumulative elevation gain of 640 metres (2,100 ft). It takes between 5 and 8 hours on average to complete the trail.

== Overview ==
The trail is entirely within the national park and passes through multiple life zones of the park, from lowland forests to alpine meadows of wildflowers. As the trail climbs up to the plateau, hikers see different wildlife in the region including marmots and different species of birds.

The trail is of medium difficulty. The overall elevation gain is not great but climbing at high altitude makes the trail more demanding. During the course of the trail, one encounters boulders, meadows, plateaus, snow (in early summer) and streams. The trail and the surrounding mountains are frequently used by cattle herders who set up summer homes in the area.

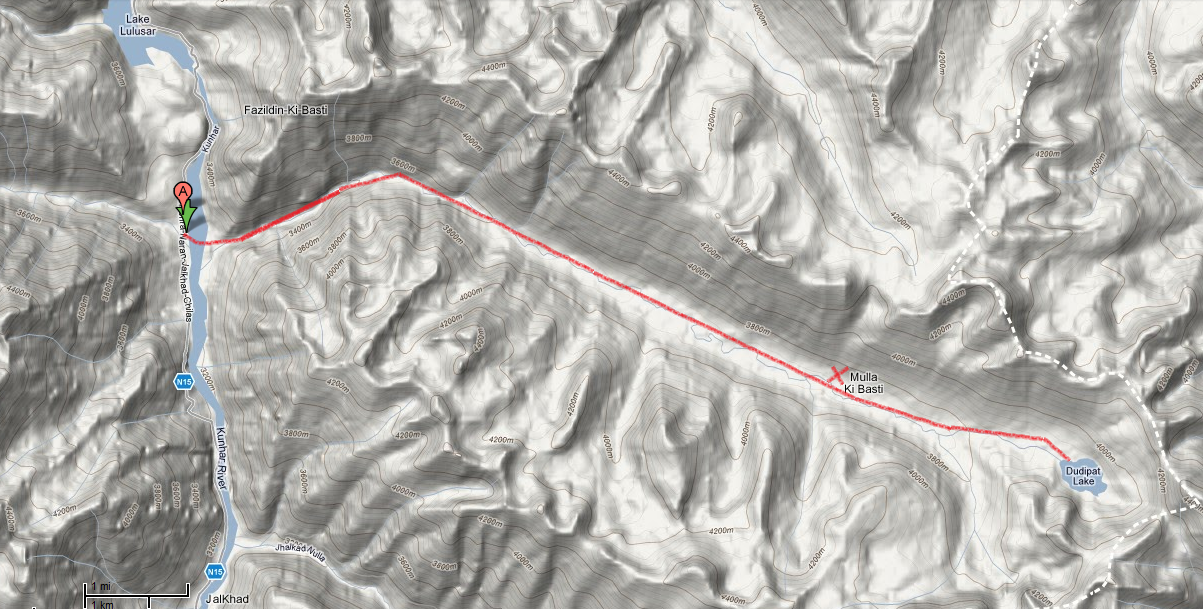
Dudipatsar Trail - General path of the trail

The main hiking season is mid-summer, which is often dry and sunny. Hikers early in the season can see snow in the ravine that runs down from the plateau. The plateau is marshy in places (waterproof boots advised). There are a number of river crossings on the trail including one buggy bridge. The same river tributary is crossed on log bridges in a couple of locations.

The trail starts at Besal, where there is a driver hotel and a police check post. Lodging is available as well as space for setting up camp. Parking of vehicles is done at one's own risk but someone can be hired to look after vehicles for a day or two.

There are three ways to hike the trail:

- One-day trek (advised for moderate to experienced hikers) will not require a night stay. Going up to the lake can be done in about 3–5 hours while coming down it will take 3–4 hours.
- Two-day trek (for novice to moderate hikers) will require a night stay either in Mulla ki Basti (2 km (1.2 mi) short of Dudipatsar) or at Dudipat Lake itself. Going up to the lake can take anywhere from 6 to 10 hours. Coming back is generally quicker, around 5–6 hours. Mules can be rented at Besal to carry luggage for the trek.
- A three-day trek will require two night stays in Mulla ki Basti or at Dudipatsar. Hikers can reach the planned destination and after an overnight stay have a full day to tour the lake. Again after a night stay they can get back easily.

Guides are available at Besal for a hike to Dudipatsar. Experienced hikers can wing it and go off on their own – remember to follow the water tributary as Dudipatsar is at the head.

Mid-September, most of the herding flocks and inhabitants of Mullah ki Basti come down in preparation of winter. So if one plans to head towards Dudipat Lake at that time, it is necessary to take ample amount of food and preferably tents as no lodging is available for 9–10 km (5.6–6.2 mi) from the starting point. The makeshift hotels are also shut down so no food is available. If one reaches Mullah ki Basti, abandoned stone houses are available to camp and rest for the night.

== Chronology of images ==
Images of Dudipatsar Trail
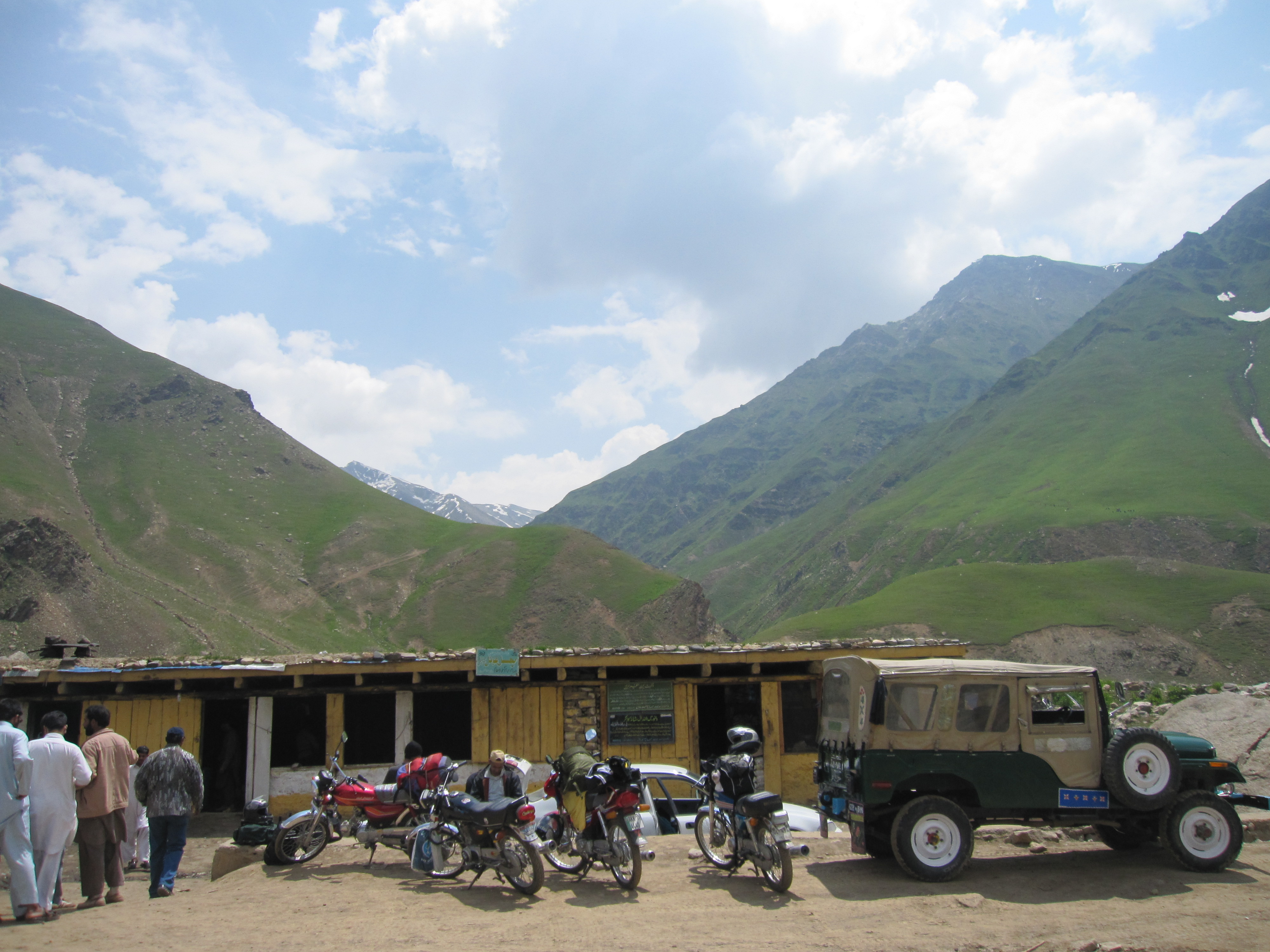
1. Starting Location: Driver Hotel at Besal

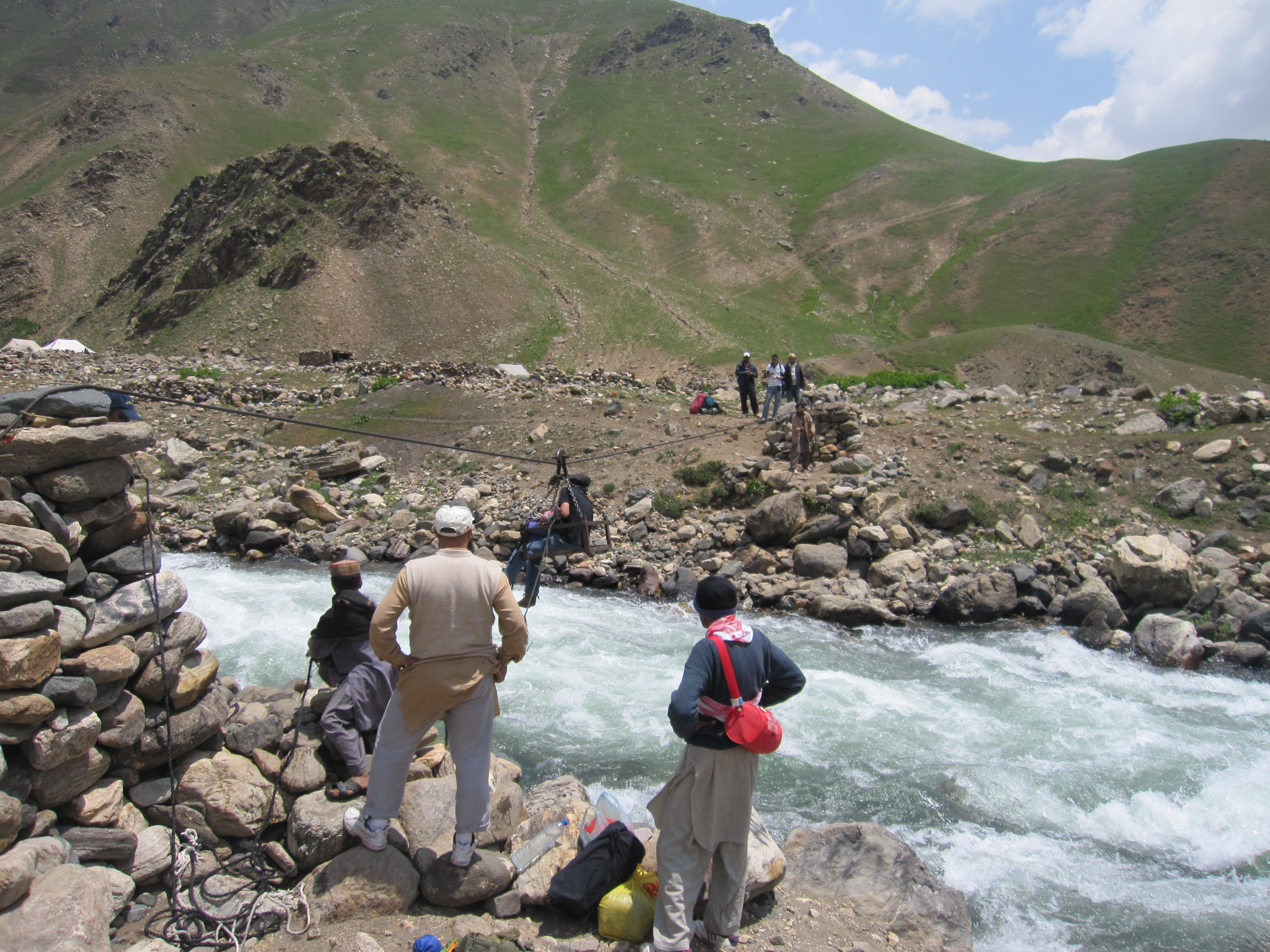
2. Crossing Kunhar River on Cable Bridge

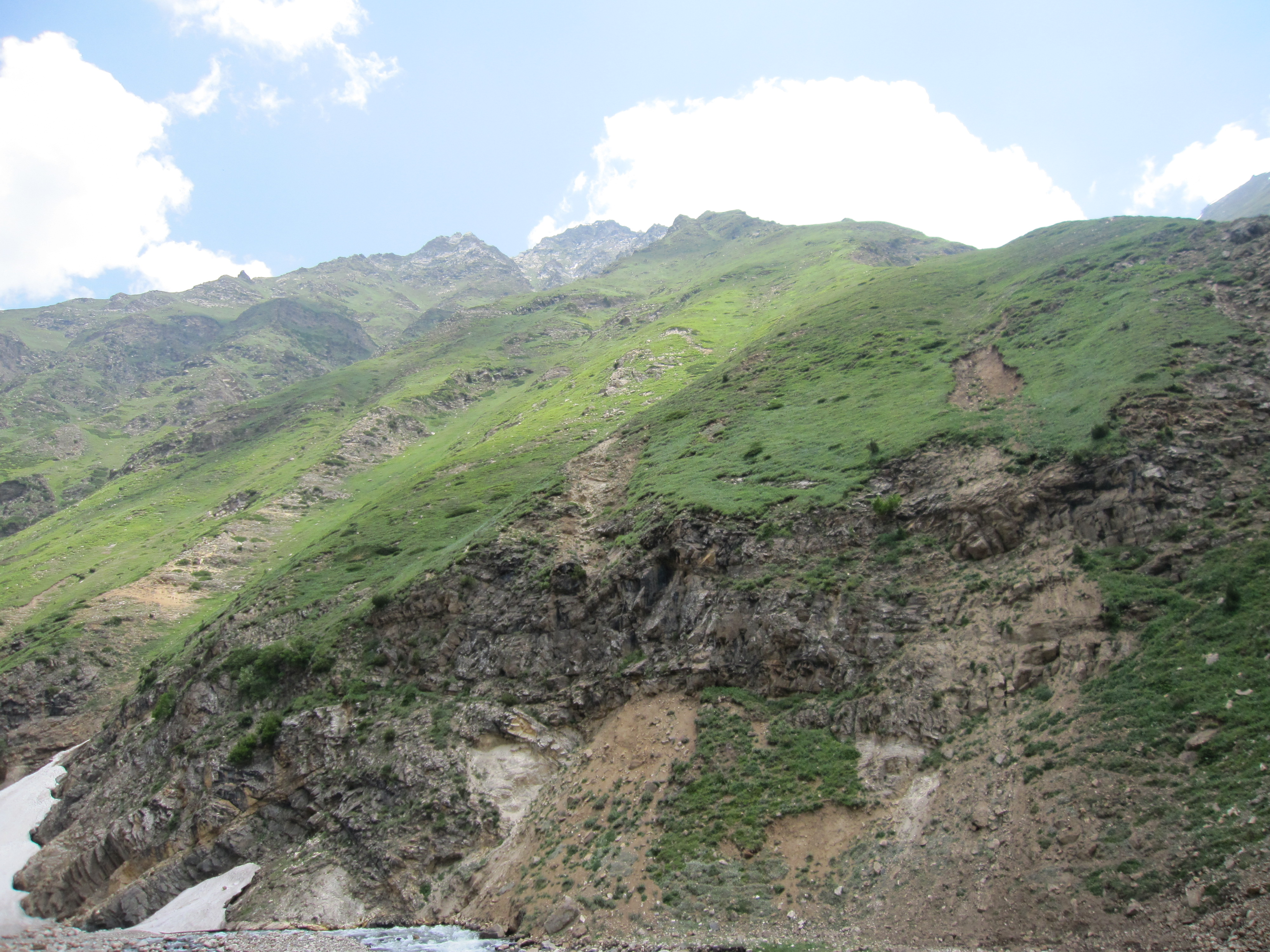
3. Fertile mountain tops along the initial climb

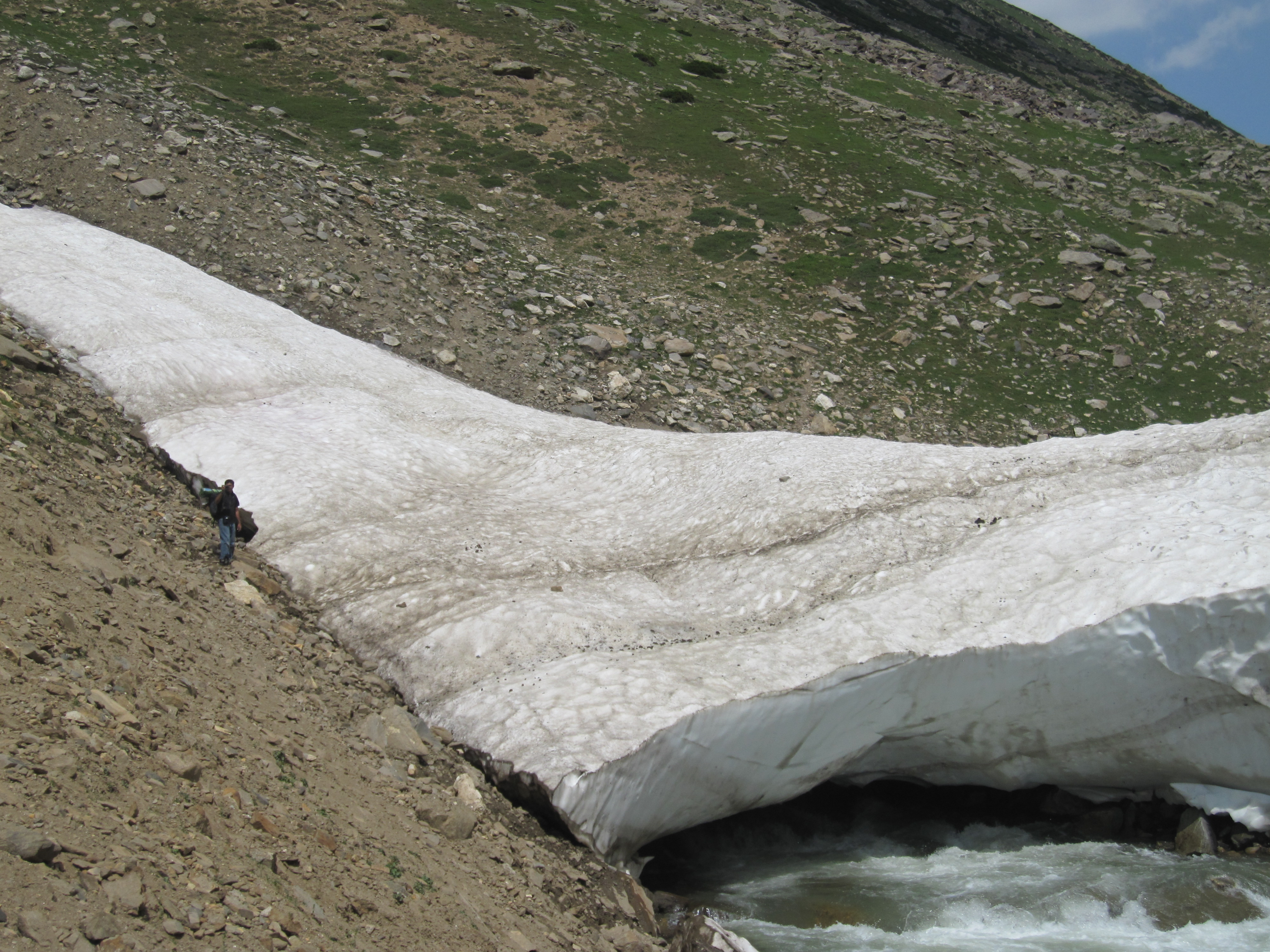
4. River crossing (late June)

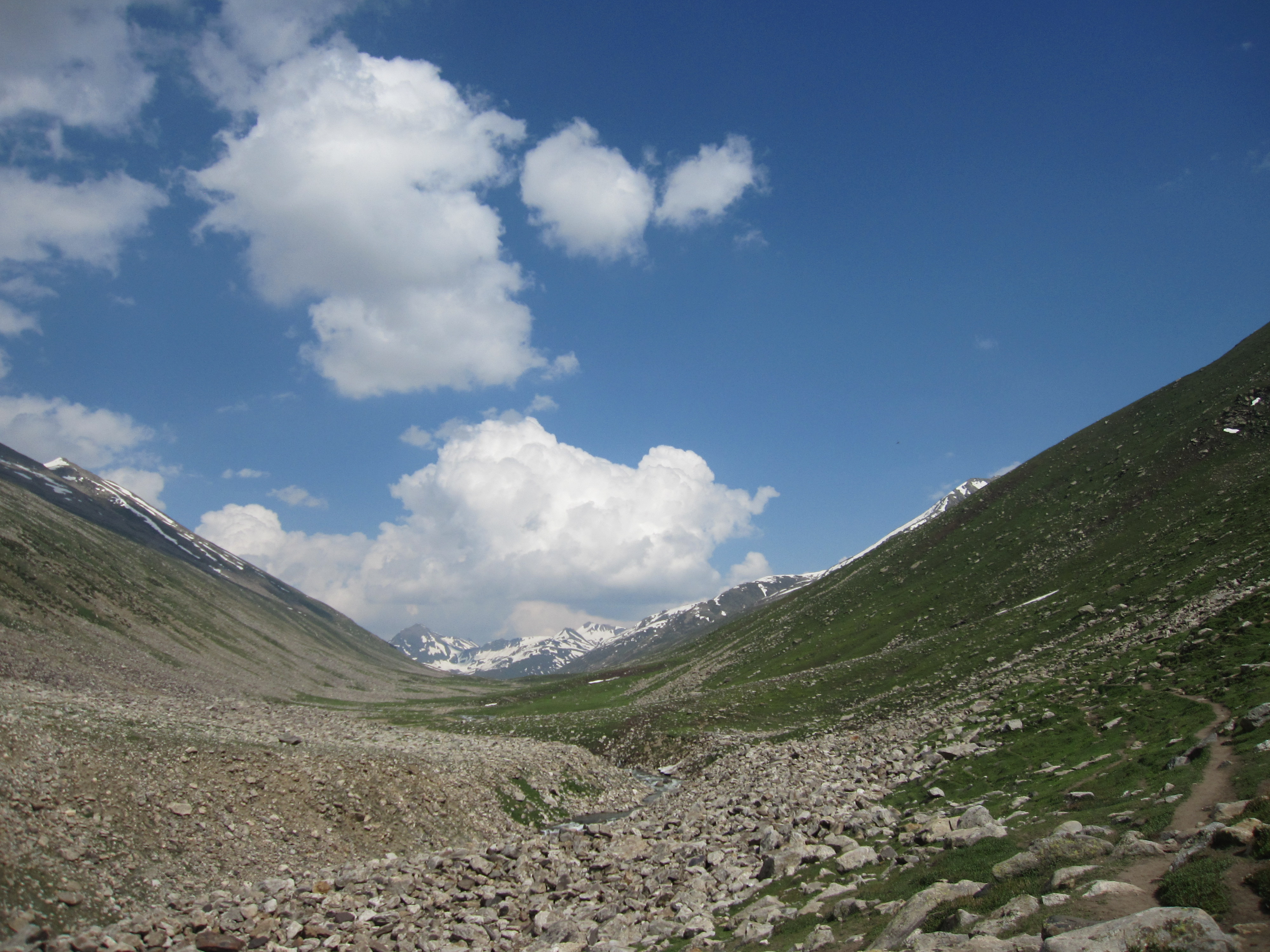
5. Climbing up to the plateau

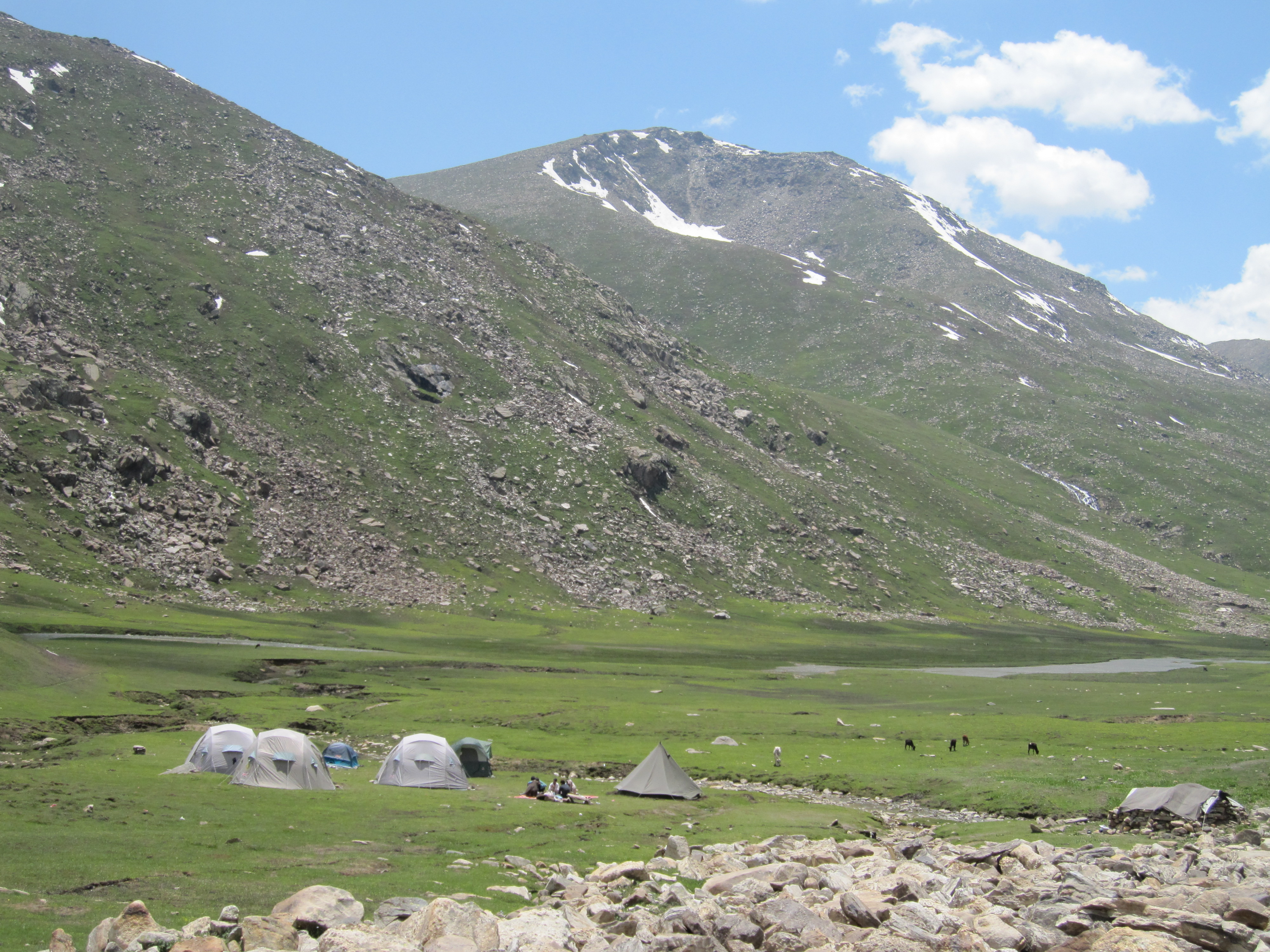
6. View of the camp (a.k.a. hotel) near Mulla ki Basti

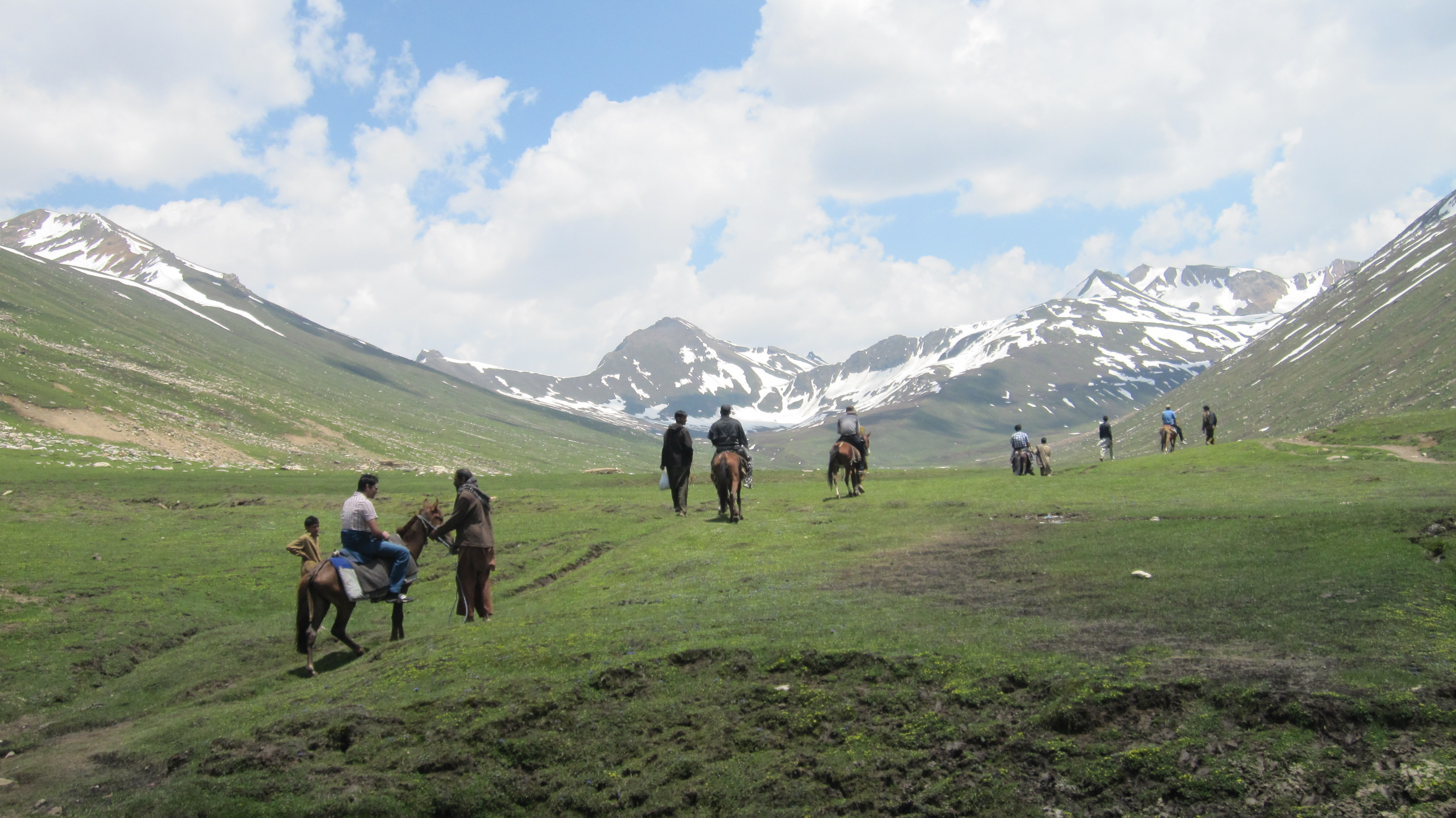
7. Some people hire horses from Mulla ki Basti

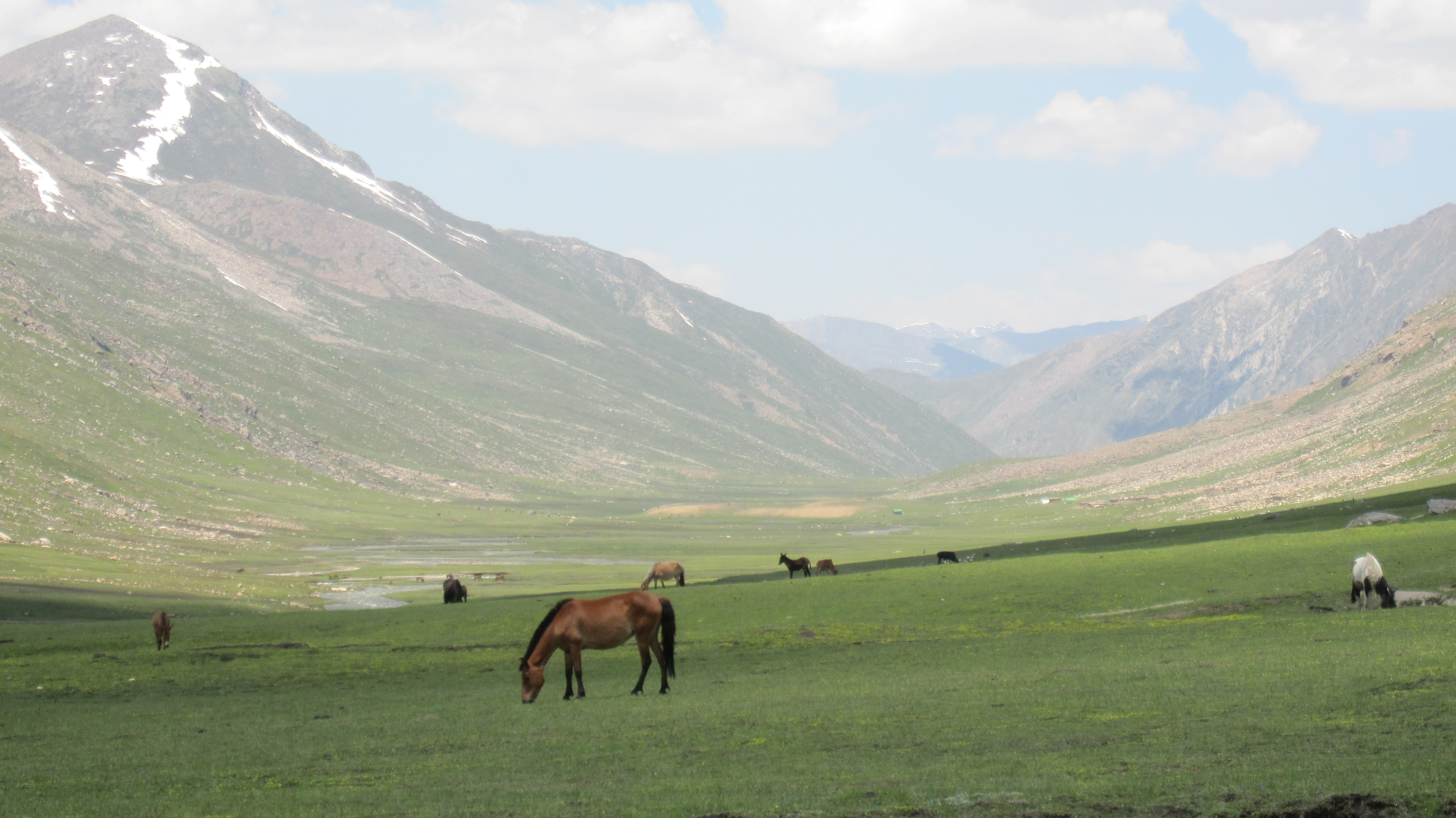
8. Grazing on the plateau

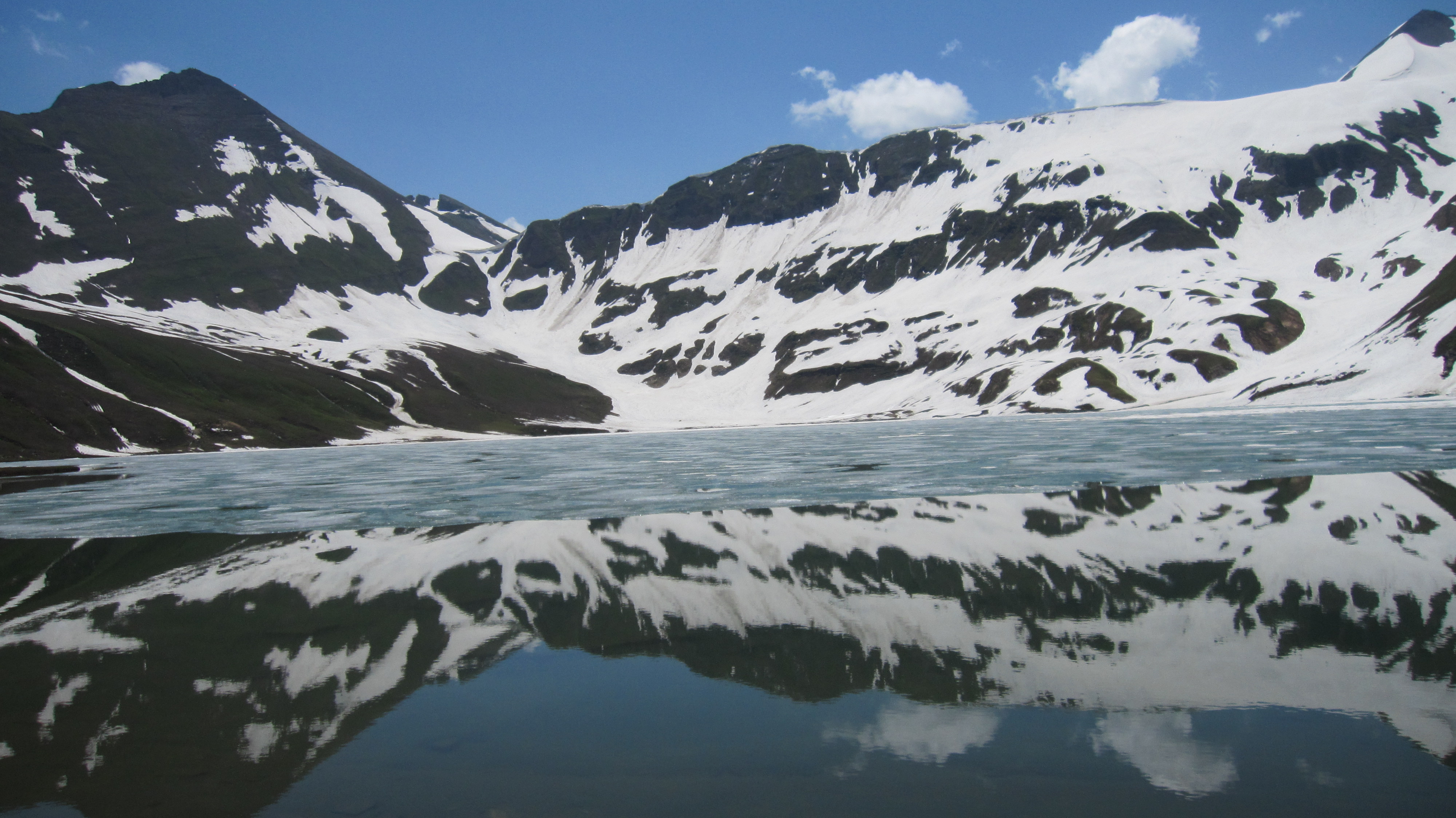
9. Dudipath Lake

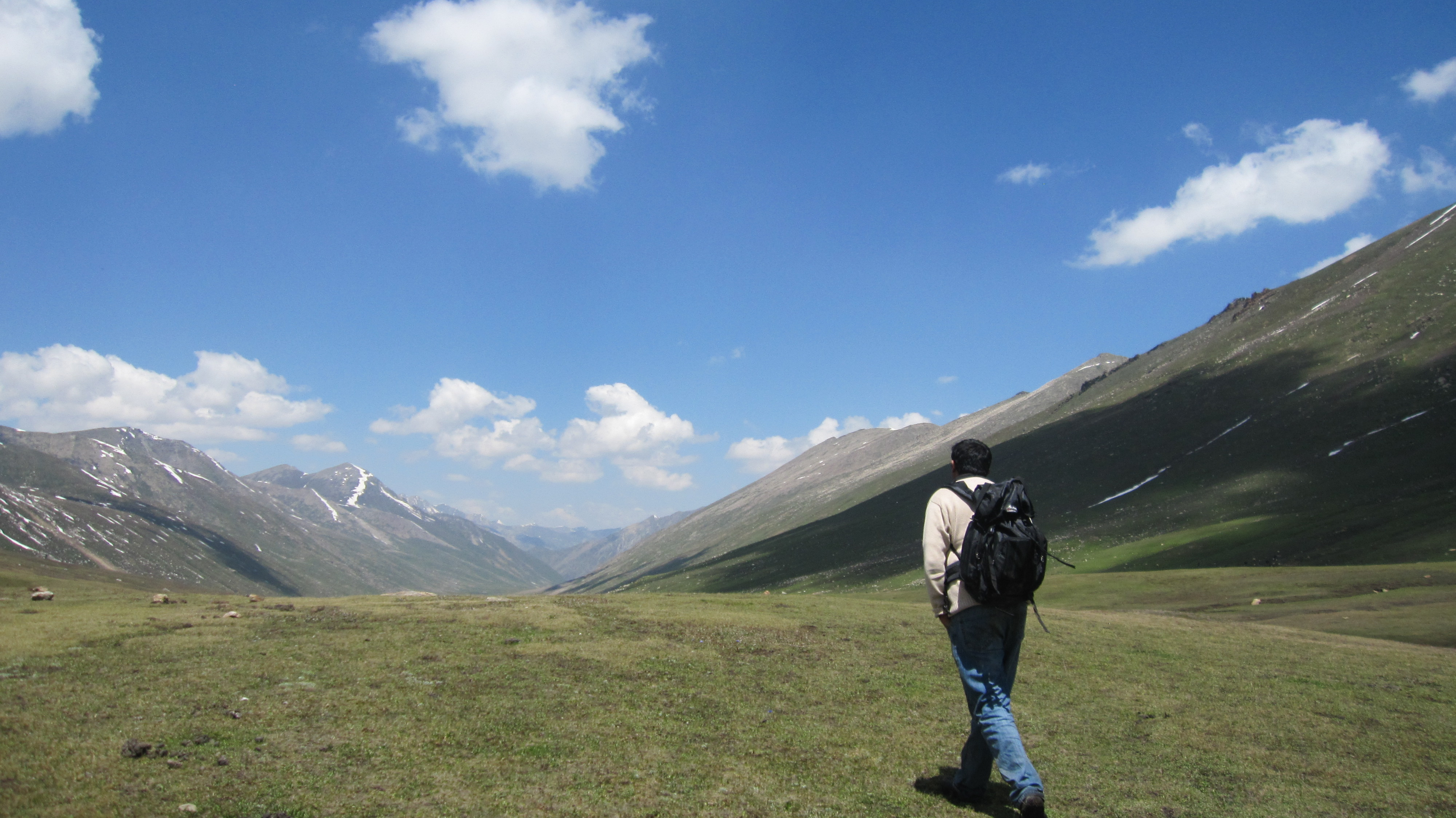
10. A view of the trek back from the lake

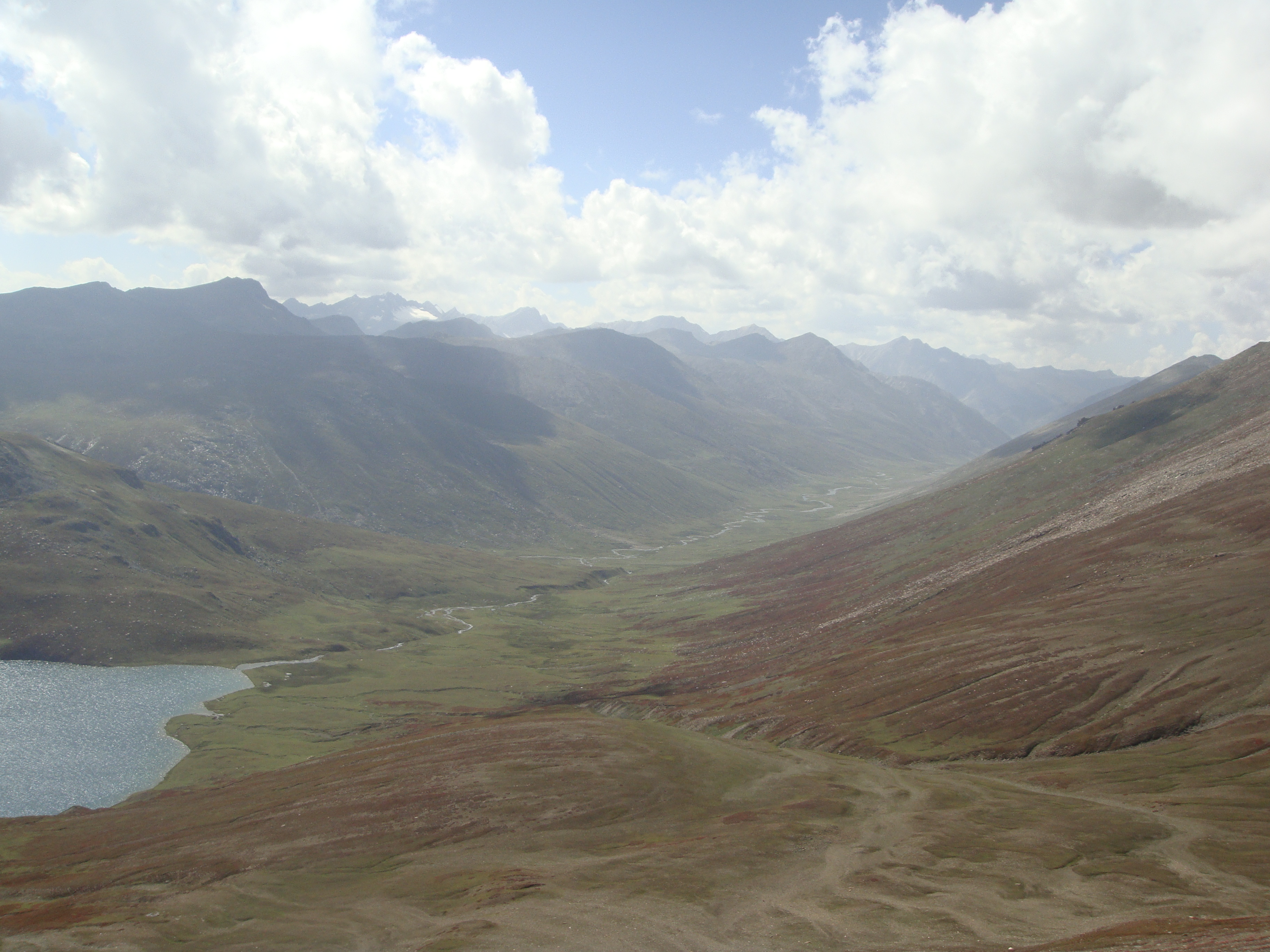
11. A view of Dudipat lake and Poorbi Narr

== See also ==
- Dudipatsar
- Lulusar-Dudipatsar National Park
