= Saiful Muluk National Park =

National park in Khyber Pakhtunkhwa, Pakistan

Coordinates: 34°52′N 73°41′E

Saiful Maluk National Park
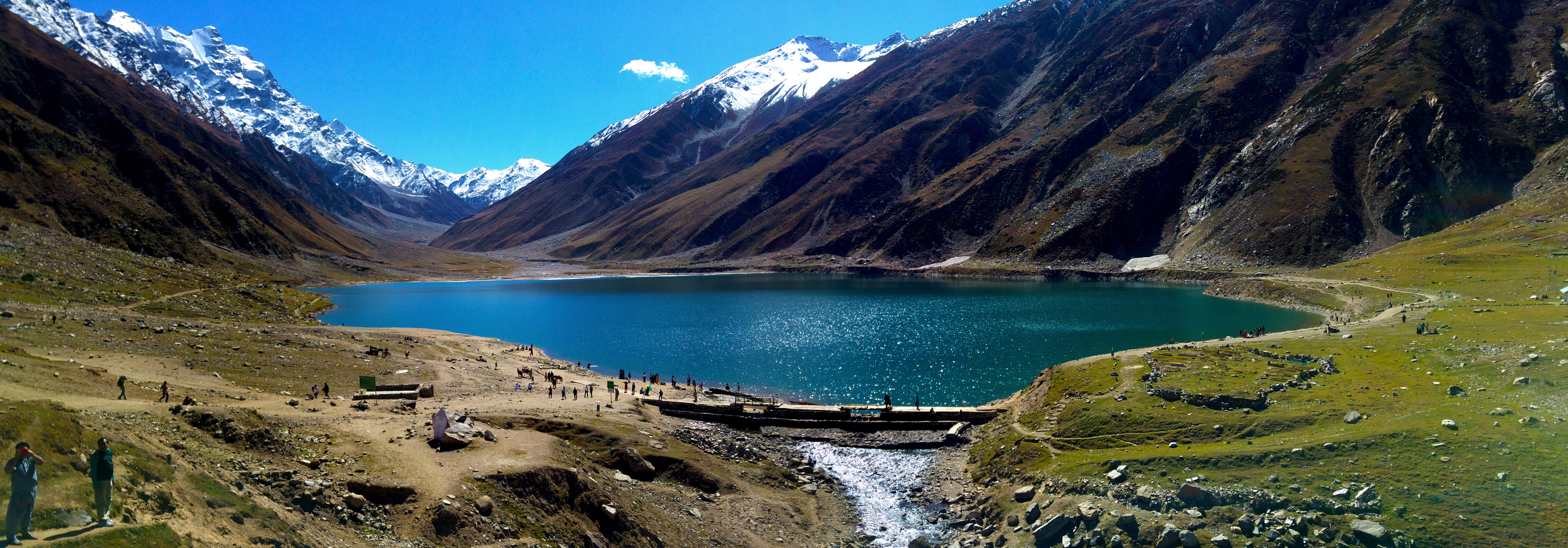
- The national park is centred on Lake Saiful Muluk
- Interactive map of Saiful Maluk National Park
- Location: Mansehra, Khyber Pakhtunkhwa, Pakistan
- Nearest city: Balakot
- Area: 880 km^{2} (340 sq mi)
- Elevation: 10,735 ft (3,272 m)
- Established: 2003

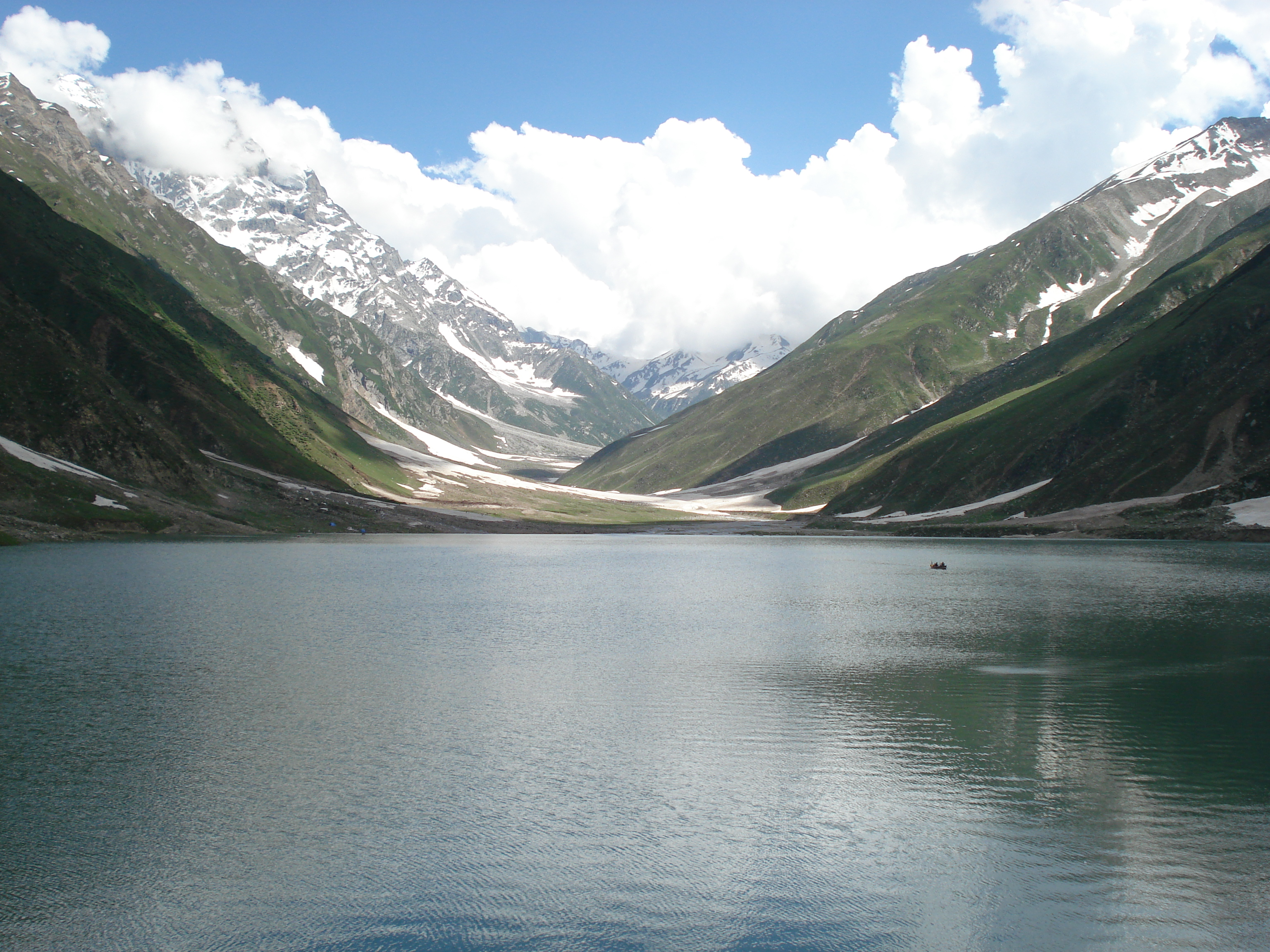
Saiful Maluk Lake and alpine valley, at Saiful Muluk National Park.

Saiful Muluk National Park (Urdu: سیف الملوک نیشنل پارک) is situated in the Kaghan Valley within the Mansehra District of Khyber Pakhtunkhwa, Pakistan. The park was officially declared in 2003, and is centred upon the alpine Saiful Muluk Lake.

== Flora and fauna ==
The flora includes the trees, shrubs, perennials, and herbs of the Himalayan Western Himalayan subalpine conifer forests and higher elevation Western Himalayan alpine shrub and meadows ecoregions.

Some of the park's fauna includes the snow leopard, Asiatic black bear, marmot, weasel, Eurasian lynx, Indian leopard, Himalayan snowcock, and the snow partridge. The park's lakes and wetlands habitats are of significant ecological importance for resident fauna and migratory waterfowl.

== Region ==
Lulusar-Dudipatsar National Park, with Lulusar Lake and Dudipatsar Lake, is adjacent to Saiful Muluk National Park in the Kaghan Valley region. Together the parks protect 88,000 hectares (220,000 acres).

== See also ==
- List of lakes in Pakistan
- List of parks and gardens in Pakistan
