= Dudipatsar Lake =

Lake in Kaghan Valley, Pakistan

Dudipatsar دودی پت سر جھیل
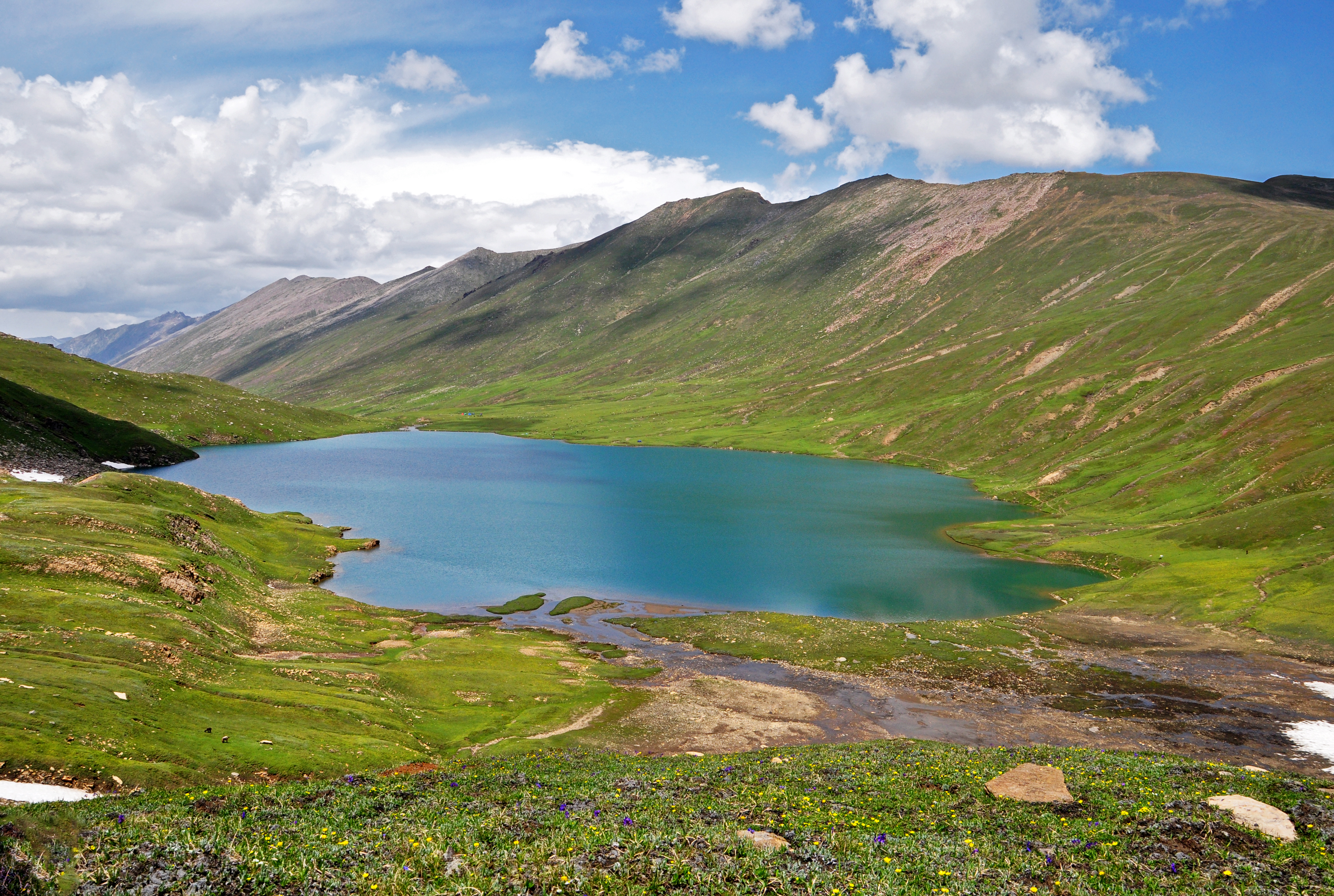
- Dudipatsar Lake, Lulusar-Dudipatsar National Park

- Location within Khyber Pakhtunkhwa
- Location: Kaghan Valley, Khyber Pakhtunkhwa, Pakistan
- Coordinates: 35.0181°N 74.0900°E
- Type: Alpine lake/glacial
- Part of: Indus River basin
- Primary inflows: Glacial water
- Primary outflows: Purbinar valley
- Basin countries: Pakistan
- Max. length: 835 metres (2,740 ft)
- Max. width: 600 metres (2,000 ft)
- Average depth: approx. 5 m (16 ft)
- Max. depth: approx. 5 m (16 ft)
- Residence time: May to September
- Surface elevation: 3,800 metres (12,500 ft)

Dudipatsar Lake (Urdu: دودی پت سر جھیل), also known as Dudipat Lake, is a lake encircled by snow-clad peaks in Lulusar-Dudipatsar National Park. The lake lies at the north end of the Kaghan Valley, in the Mansehra District, Khyber Pakhtunkhwa province, in northern Pakistan.

== Geography ==
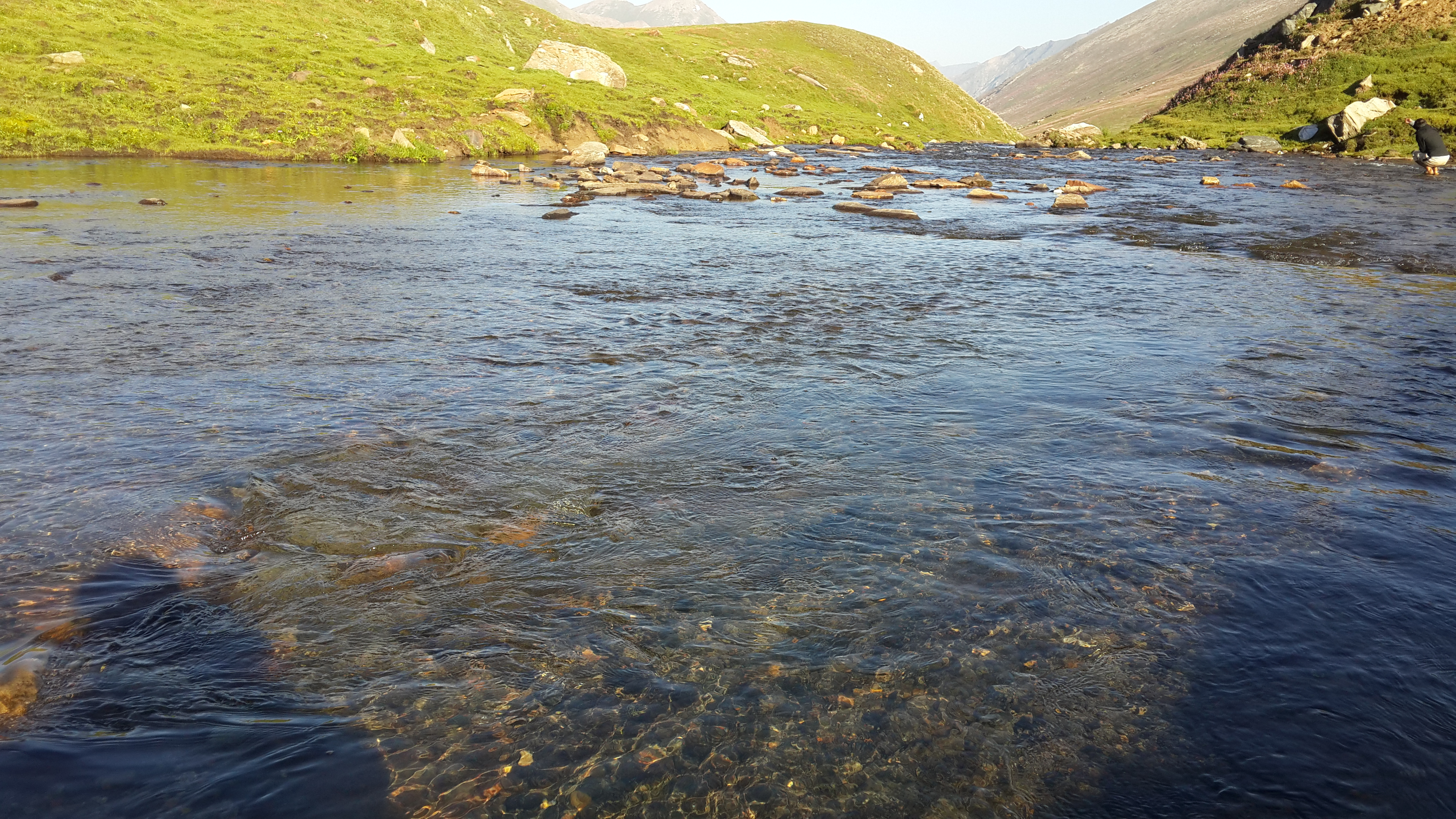
Outlet of Dudipatsar

The lake's water is a greenish blue hue and very cold, at an elevation of 3,800 metres (12,500 ft). The surrounding mountains, with snow patches in the shady dales, average around 4,800 metres (15,700 ft) in elevation. Their natural habitat is in the Western Himalayan alpine shrub and meadows ecoregion.

Lulusar Lake, also in the park, is the primary headwaters of the Kunhar River. Saiful Muluk National Park, with Saiful Maluk Lake, is adjacent in the 150 kilometres (93 mi) long Kaghan Valley region and the two parks jointly protect 88,000 hectares (220,000 acres).

=== Travel ===
Besal, or Besar, a town just before the Lulusar Lake, is fifteen kilometers from the lake. The trek can be a tough hike and not particularly suitable for unfit or new trekkers. Slopes can be steep and there are numerous water-crossings which require a lot of hard work and strength. It is preferable to make Mullah Ki Basti, a small town along the way, the base camp for the lake. Due to security issues, it is recommended to spend the night at this camp and leave for the lake in the morning.

A fit person can easily complete the track in 6–8 hours including breaks.

=== Wildlife ===
The lake and its wetlands habitats are of significant ecological importance for resident fauna and migratory waterfowl. Some of the park's fauna includes the snow leopard, black bear, marmot, weasel, lynx, leopard, Himalayan snowcock, and snow partridge.

== Access ==
The 2005 Kashmir earthquake in North Pakistan made access more difficult. However, since 2006 the Pakistan government has taken steps to restore tourism in the Kaghan Valley, including restoring as well as building new tourism facilities and infrastructure. To reach the lake, you start your hiking from a small village near Lulusar, called Besal. It is strongly advised to rent mules from here for you and your rations. After crossing one of the streams which later form the Kunhar river downstream, it is a hike of around 6 to 7 hours to the lake. Most people have to stay overnight at a stone-hut village near the lake called "Mulla ki Basti". You need to carry tents and sleeping bags with you.

== See also ==
- Pyala Lake
- Dudipatsar Trail
- Babusar Pass
- Kaghan Valley
- List of lakes in Pakistan
- List of national parks of Pakistan
