= Lulusar-Dudipatsar National Park =

National park of Pakistan

Coordinates: 35°01′N 74°05′E

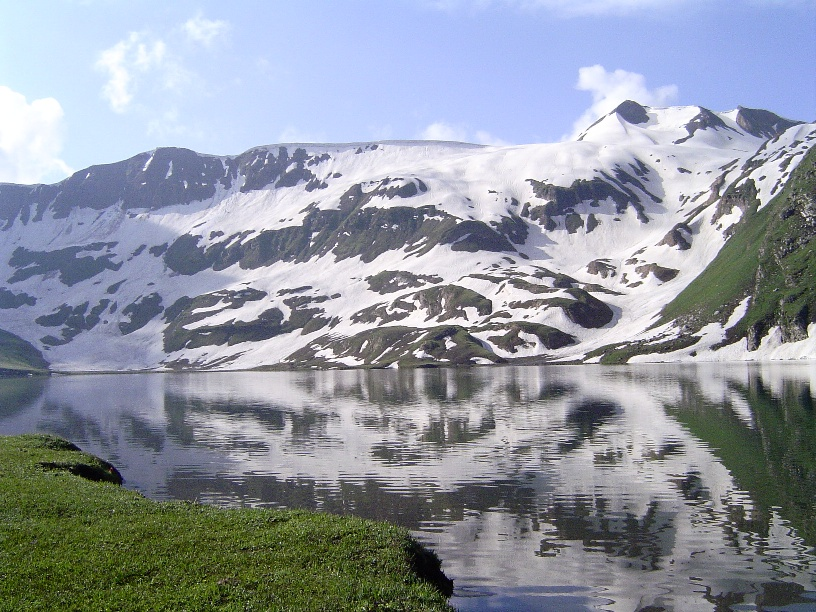
Morning reflections on Dudipatsar Lake

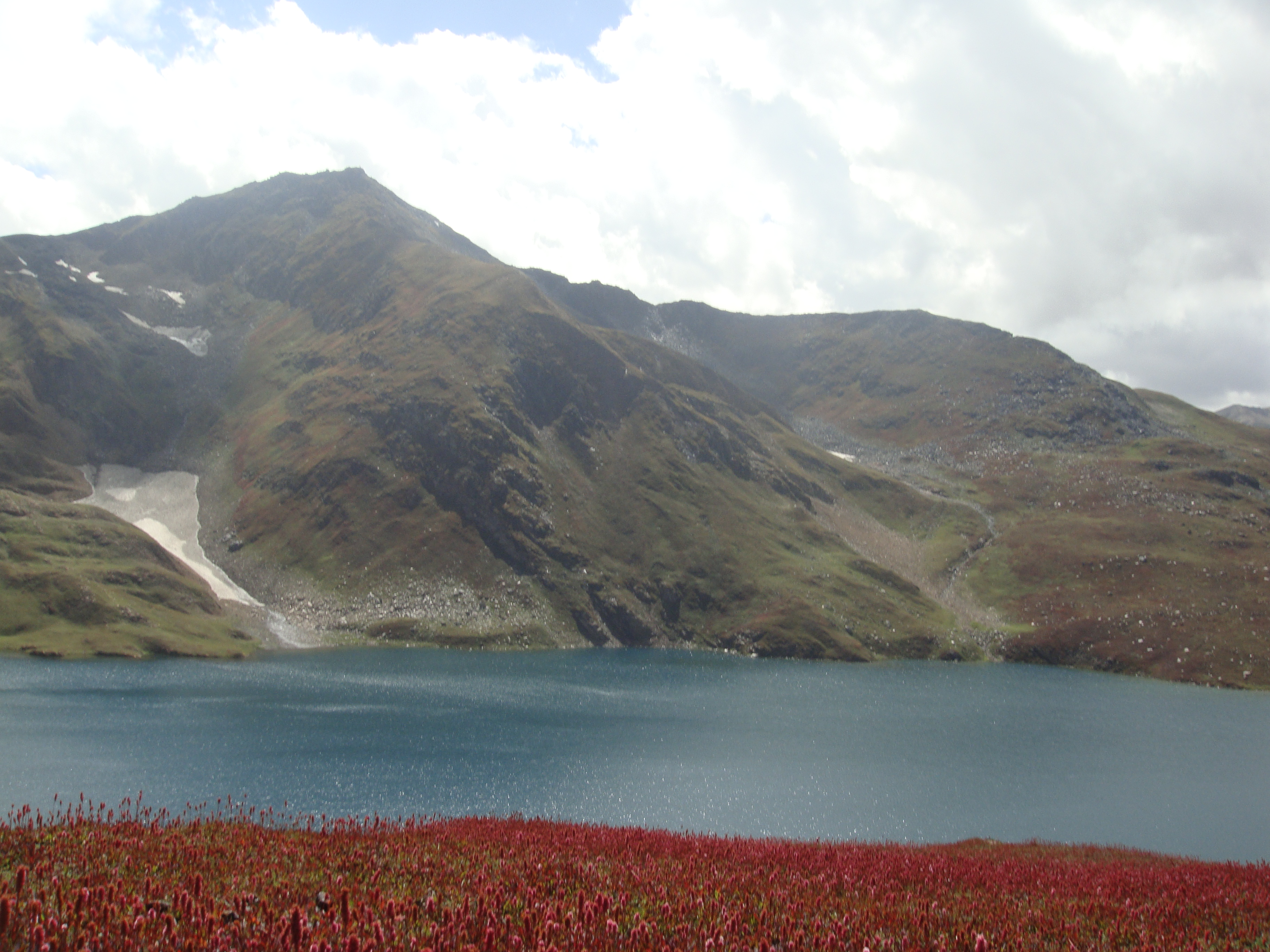
Dudipatsar with red flowers

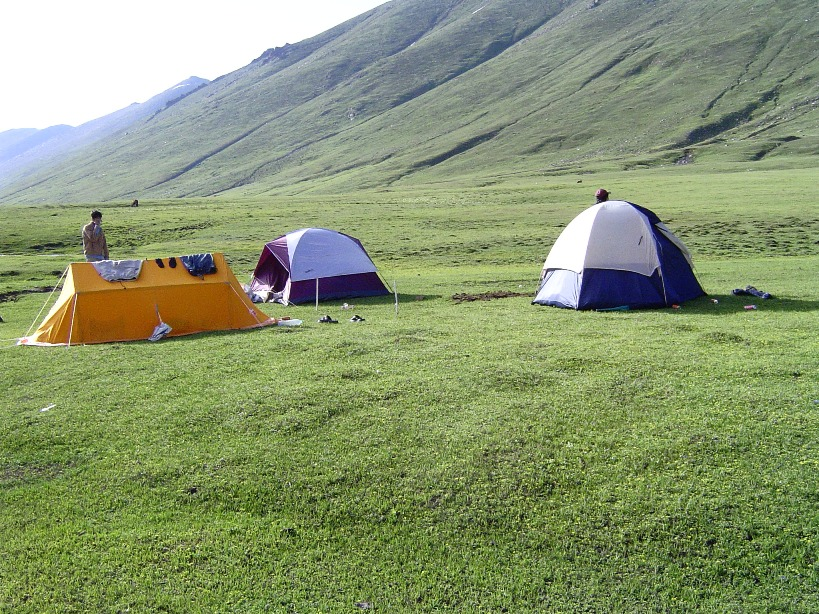
Camping near the lake, in Lulusar-Dudipatsar National Park

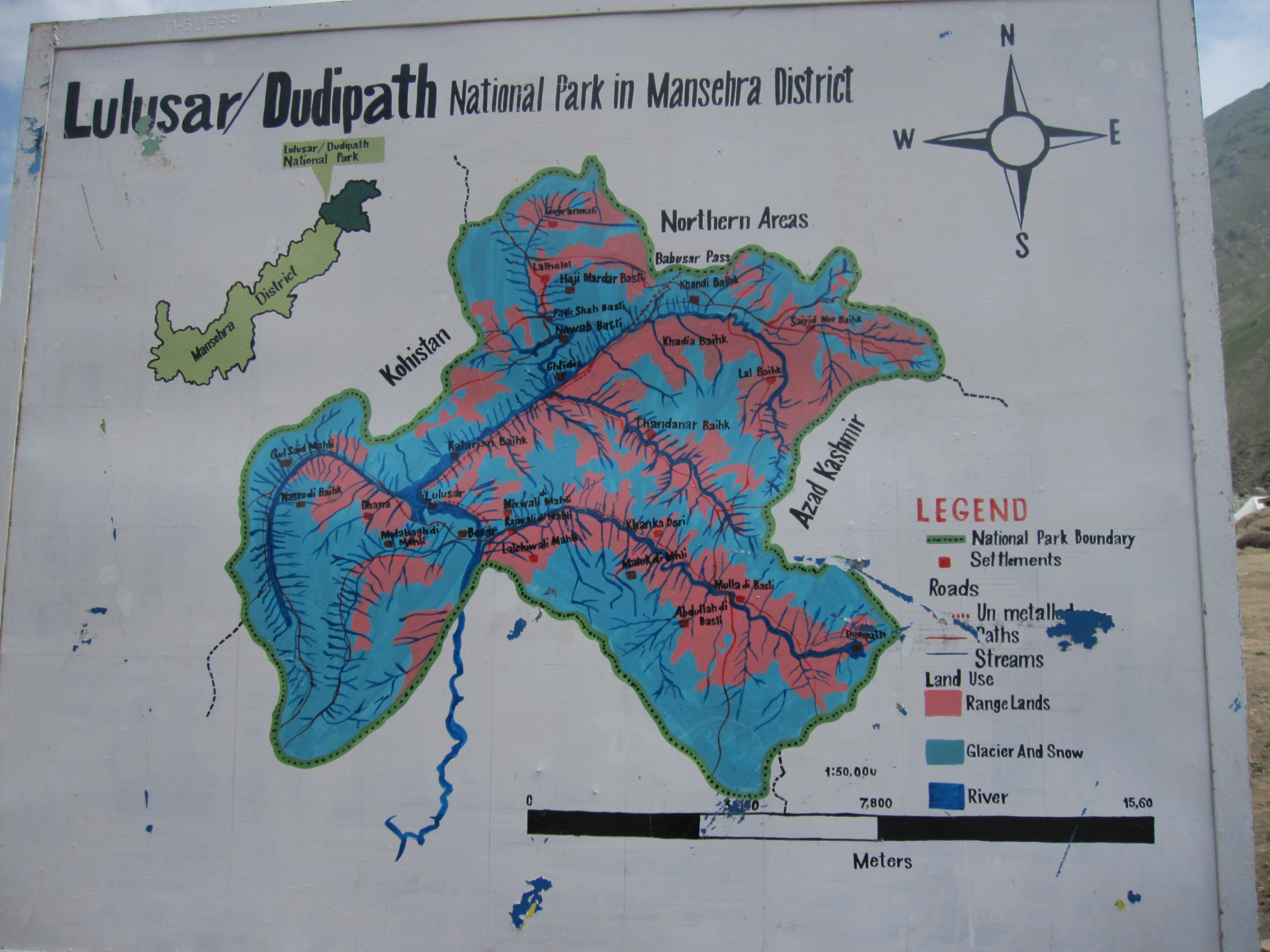
Map of Lulusar-Dudipath National Park

Lulusar-Dodipat National Park is located in the Kaghan Valley in Mansehra District of Khyber Pakhtunkhwa, Pakistan. The park was created in 2003. The scenic Dudipatsar Lake and Lulusar Lake and peaks are in the park.

== Flora and fauna ==
The flora includes the trees, shrubs, perennials, and herbs of the Himalayan Western Himalayan subalpine conifer forests and higher elevation Western Himalayan alpine shrub and meadows ecoregions. Some of the park's fauna includes the snow leopard, black bear, marmot, weasel, lynx, leopard, Himalayan snowcock, and the snow partridge. The park's lakes and wetlands habitats are of significant ecological importance for resident fauna and migratory waterfowl.

== Access ==
The road is accessible by cars and motorbikes. The 2005 Kashmir earthquake in North Pakistan destroyed roads and other infrastructure and made access more difficult. However, since 2006 the Pakistan government has taken steps to restore tourism in the Kaghan Valley, including rebuilding and new tourism facilities and infrastructure.

== Region ==
Saiful Muluk National Park, with Lake Saiful Muluk, is adjacent to Lulusar-Dodipat National Park in the Kaghan Valley region. Together the two national parks protect 88,000 hectares (220,000 acres).

== Lakes ==
- Dudipatsar Lake-Dudipatsar Lake or Dudipat Lake is a lake encircled by snow clad peaks in Lulusar-Dudipatsar National Park. The lake lies in the extreme north of the Naran Valley. The word "dudi" means white, "pat" means mountains and "sar" means lake. This name has been given to the lake because of the white color of snow at surrounding peaks. In summer the water of the lake reflects like a mirror. The word "sar" is used with the name of each lake in the area, translating as 'lake.
- Lulusar Lake-Lulusar is group of mountain peaks and a lake in the Naran Valley in the Khyber-Pakhtunkhwa province of Pakistan. The word "sar" means "top" or "peak" in Pashto. The highest peak has a height of 11,200 ft (3,410 m) above sea level (N35.0804 E73.9266).

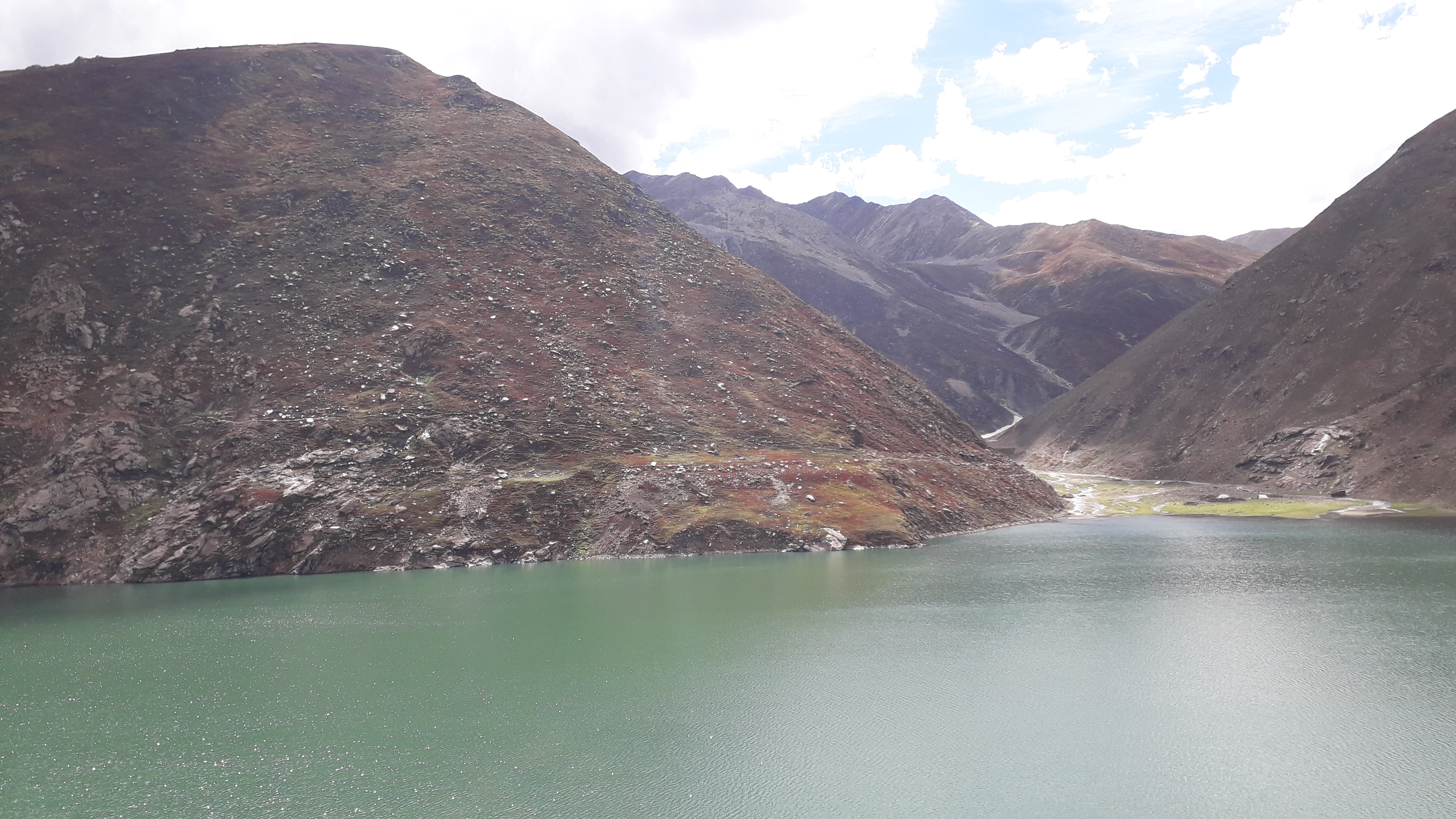
Lulusar Lake on a sunny day.

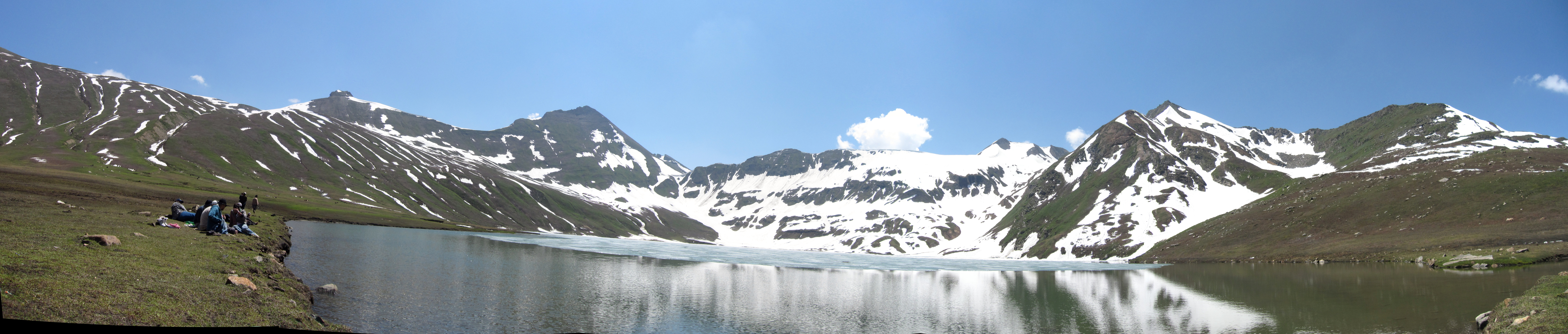
A panoramic view of Dudipatsar

Pyala Lake (Jalkad) Pyala Lake is a round shape lake located in Jalkhand, Kaghan Valley, Mansehra District of Khyber Pakhtunkhwa. This glacial lake is situated at the boundary of the LDNP along adjacent to the Jalkad Nullah. It is a source of freshwater and is surrounded by a dry temperate zone and a wet monsoon temperate zone. Pyala Lake is a tourist attraction due to its bowl-shaped location atop a mountain and its natural setting. The lake is situated on the way to Lulusar Lake from Naran, approximately 40 kilometers away.

Dohian Mali lake Jalkad Located approximately 5 km from the Nori Top road base camp, at the beginning of Jalkad Mali, are two lakes known as Dohian Mali lakes. The lakes are surrounded by Porbinar on one side, Kutawai Nullah on the front, and Jalkad Nullah on the other. The local name for these lakes is Doyi Mali, and there are two lakes in the vicinity, one smaller and the other slightly larger in size.

Sat Sari Mala Lake The name "Sat Sri Mala" refers to a chain of seven alpine lakes in the LDNP, situated at an altitude of 3,050 meters in the inner mountain ranges of the Western Himalayas. The name is derived from the local language where "Sat" means seven and "Sri Mala" refers to the chain of lakes that are connected through waterfalls. The Sat Sar Mala Lakes are a rare destination in the LDNP, with five of the seven lakes forming cascades. Surkhail Lake, located at an altitude of 14,100 feet, is the highest and topmost cascade lake. Due to its remote location, the region has a dry temperate zone and a wet monsoon temperate zone, providing visitors with a diverse range of flora and fauna. These lakes are primarily visited by trekkers and adventurers seeking to explore the stunning glacial lakes and majestic mountains. The trek to the lakes begins just before the village of Gittidas, located between Jalkhad and Babusar Pass. Access to the lakes is limited to a short period between August and September, as the lakes are snowbound for most of the year. 2.3.6 Daraham Sir Lake Lake Daraham Sir is a glacial lake situated to the left of Babusar Top at an altitude of approximately 4,100 meters in the Western Himalayas at an elevation of 4,058 meters. It is located in the Kaghan Valley within the Khyber-Pakhtunkhwa province of Pakistan. The lake is accessible via a trek from Lulusar Lake and provides an ideal habitat for trout breeding. It is surrounded by a dry temperate zone and a wet monsoon temperate zone. When travelling eastwards from Chilas on the Karakoram Highway, Lake Daraham Sir is located near the larger Sambaksar Lake and Ganai Gali. Dharamsar Lake is located in close proximity to the border of Khyber Pakhtunkhwa and Azad Jammu and Kashmir, just south of the point where the three regions of Khyber Pakhtunkhwa, Azad Kashmir and Gilgit-Baltistan meet.

Sambak Sir Lake Nestled in the inner mountain ranges of the Western Himalayas, It is a stunning glacial lake that sits at an altitude of 3,300 meters. The lake will be accessed by trekking from Lulusar Lake and is renowned for its trout breeding grounds. It is surrounded by a dry temperate zone and a wet monsoon temperate zone. The lake's name "Sambaksar" comes from the local language and means "Wall" which is fitting as it is situated next to a wall-like feature at such a high altitude. To visit this Lake, one must venture beyond Naran in the Kaghan Valley. The journey begins from Basel, with a slight deviation from the well-known route to Dudipatsar Lake leading to the Samabsar Lake and Dharamsar Lake. The Sambaksar Lake is larger than Dharamsar Lake and even in August/September, the lake's water is not entirely melted.

== Gallery ==
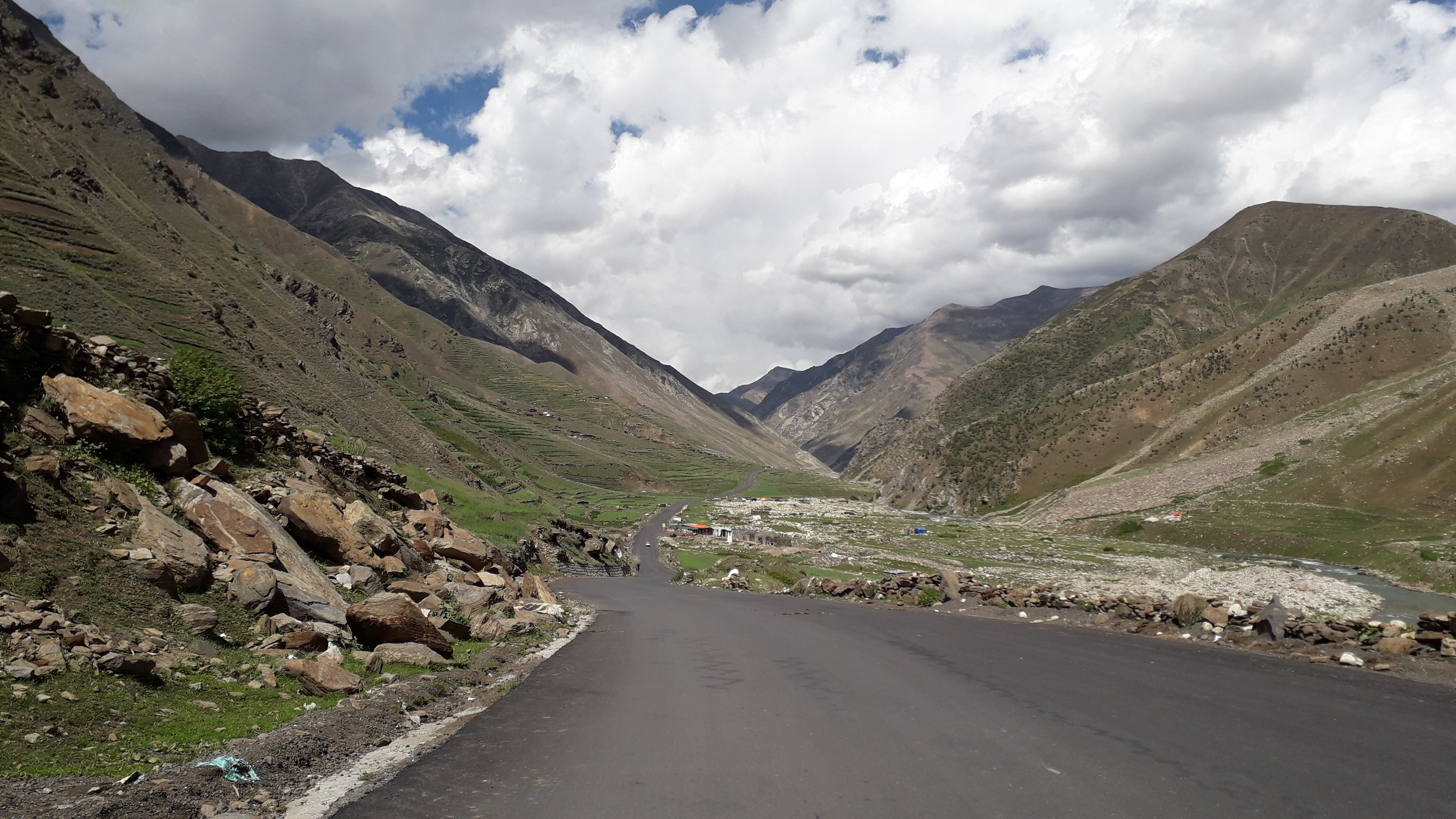

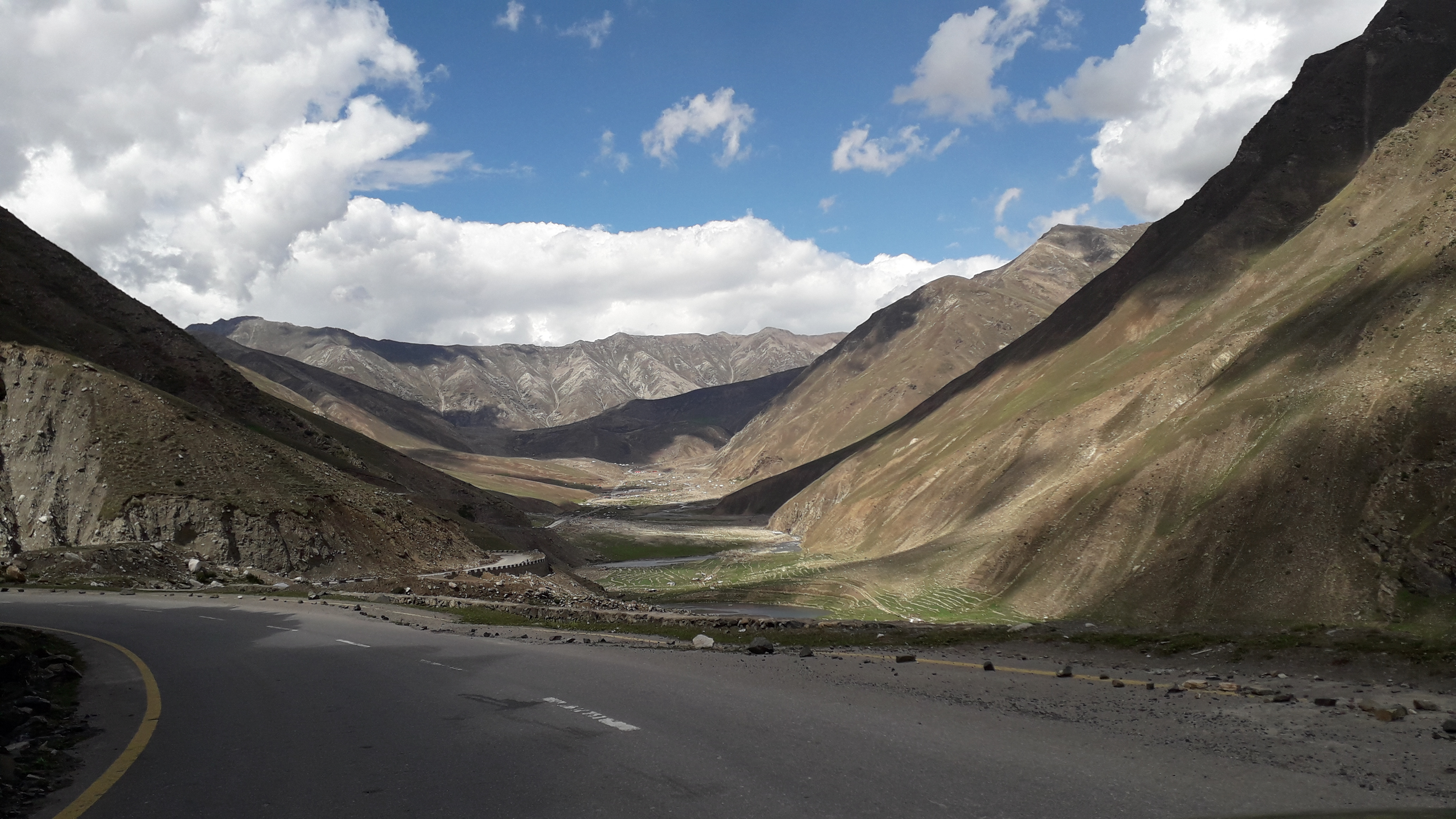

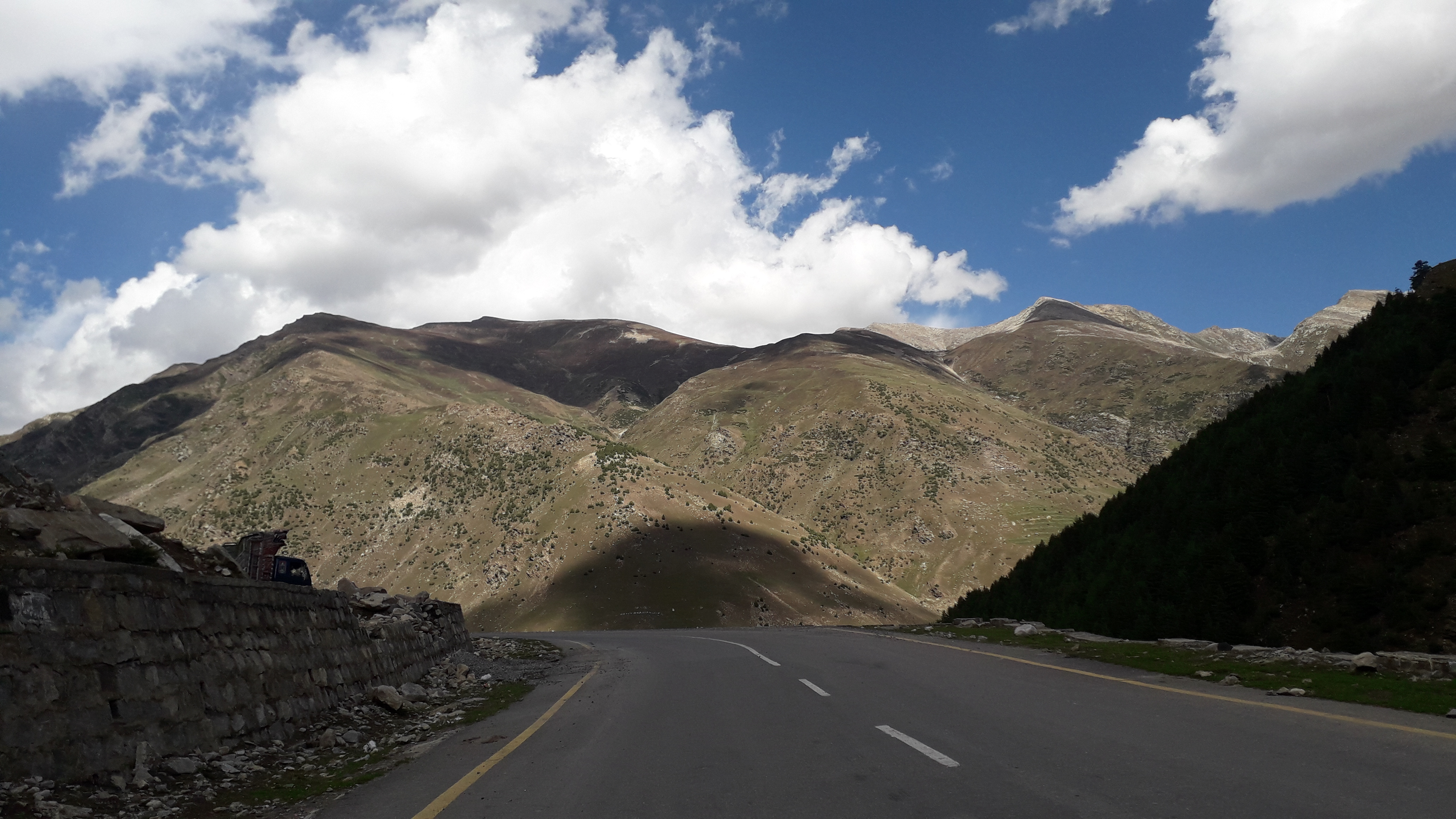

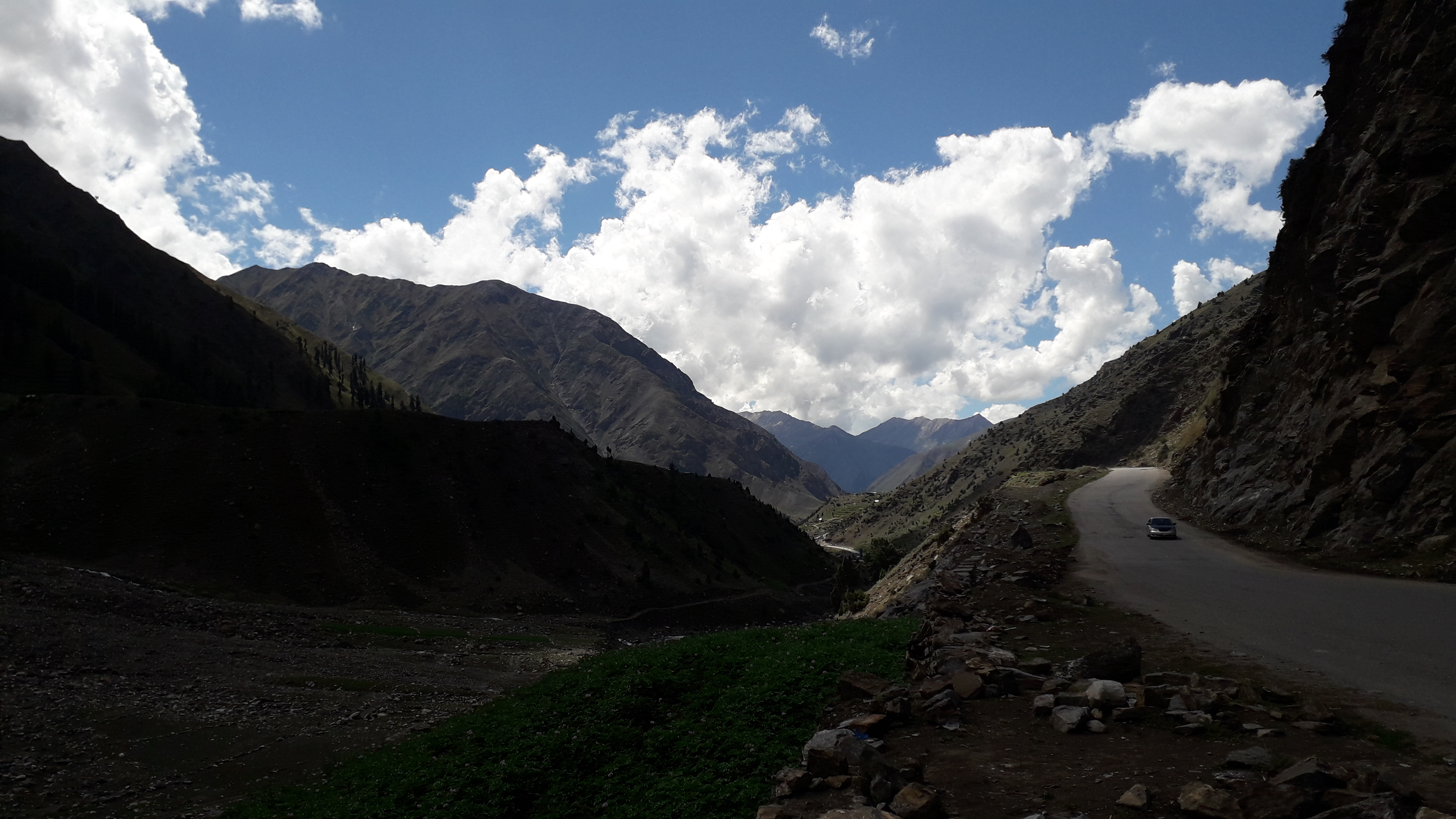

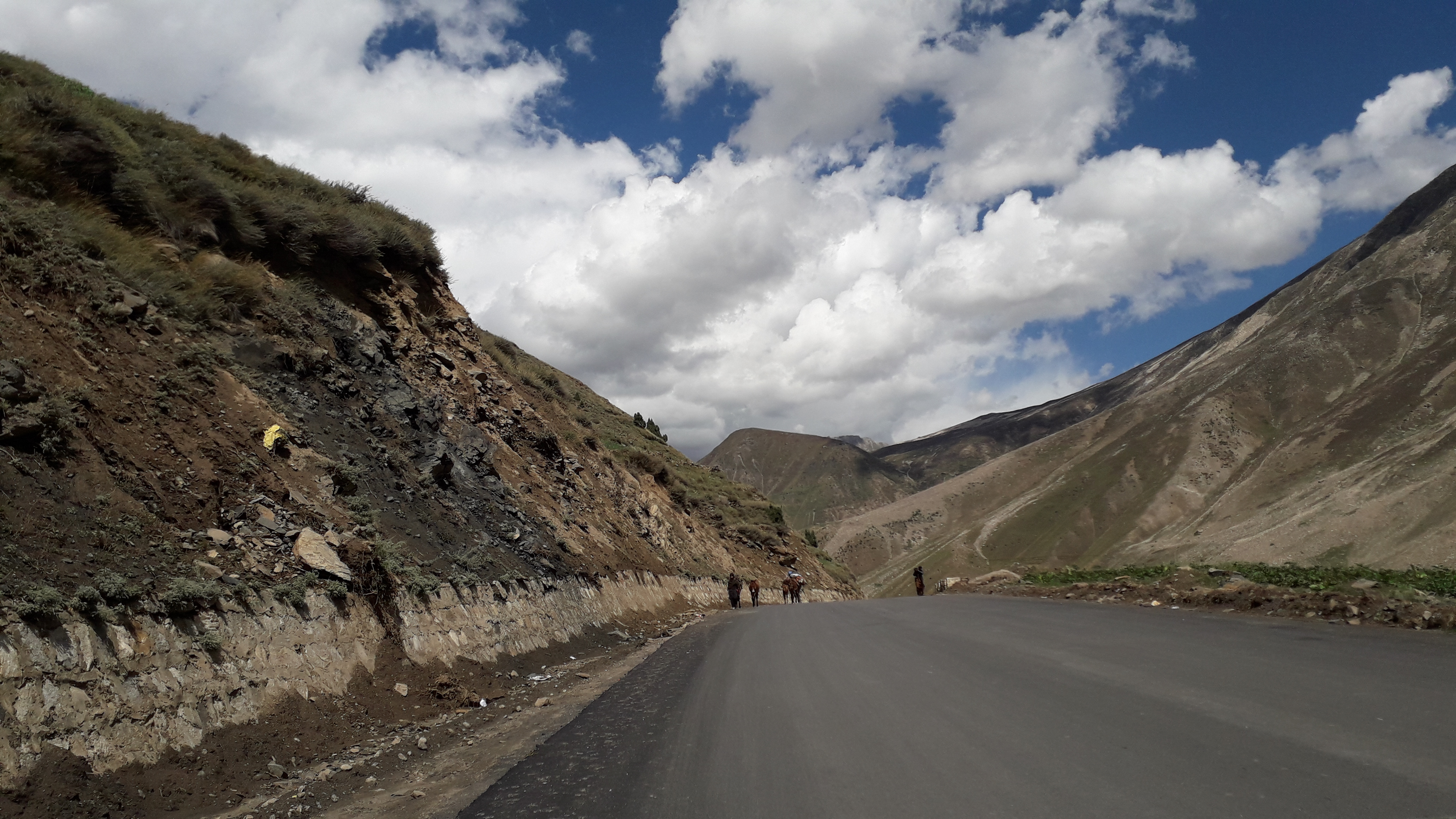

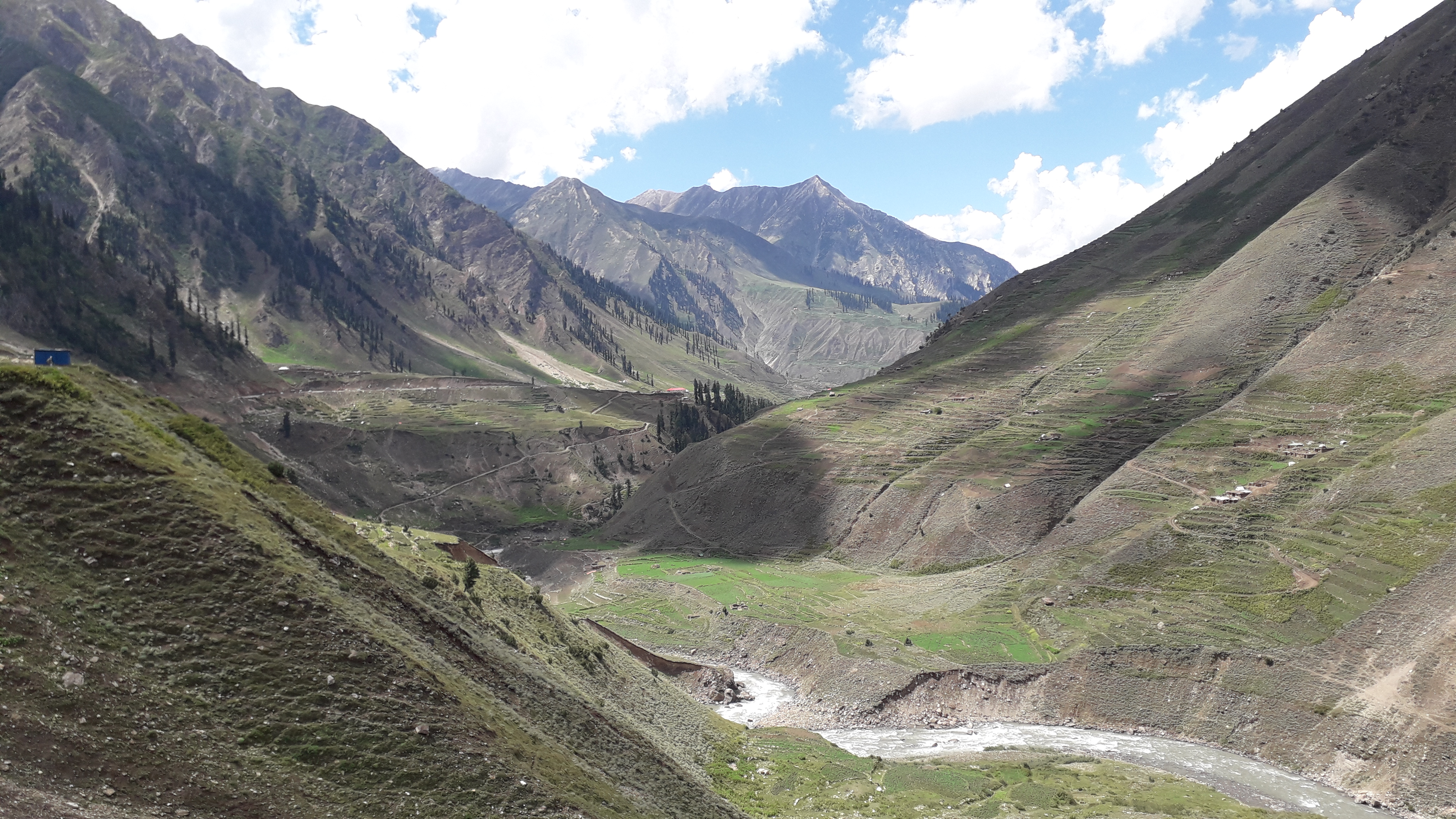

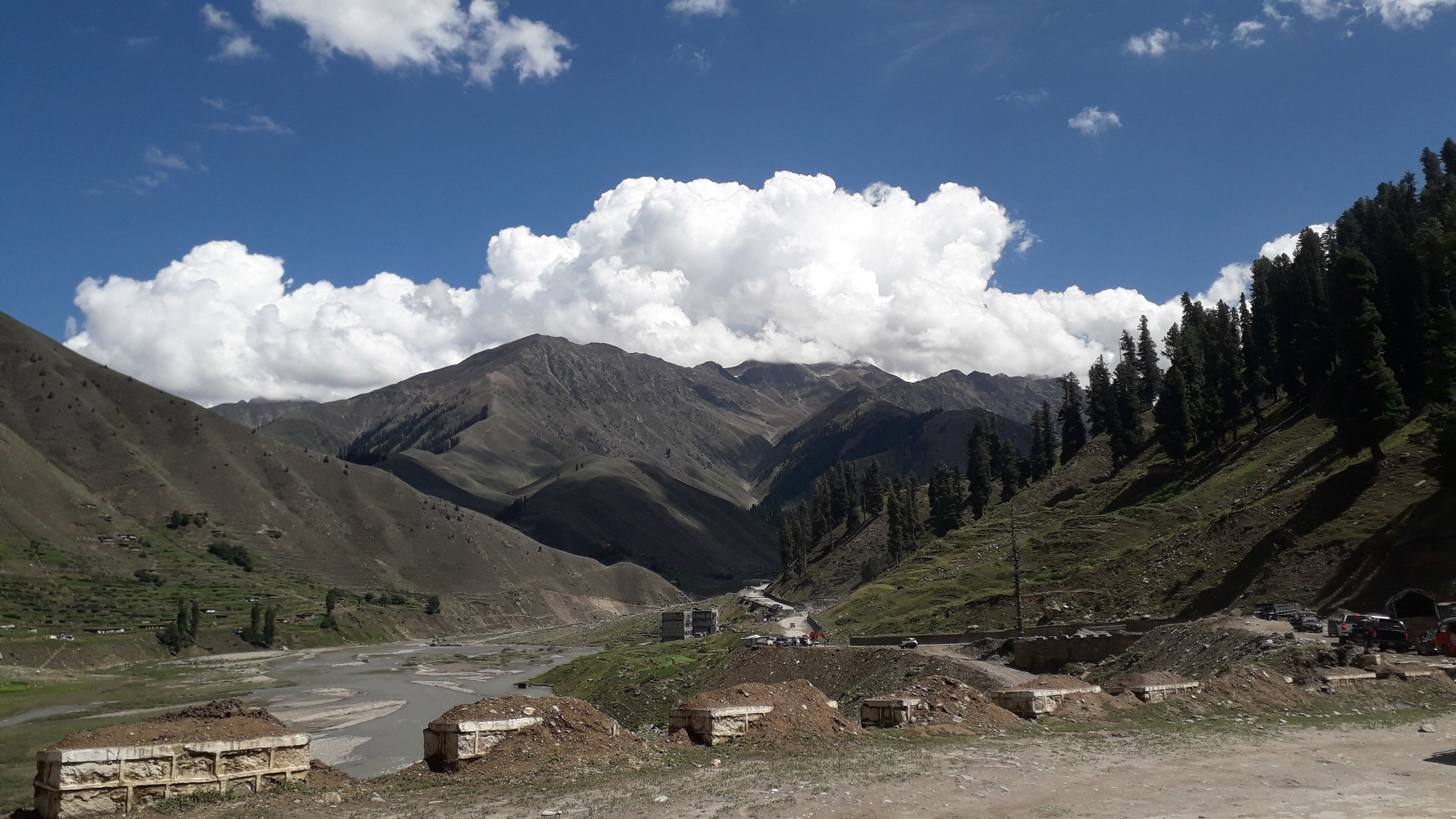

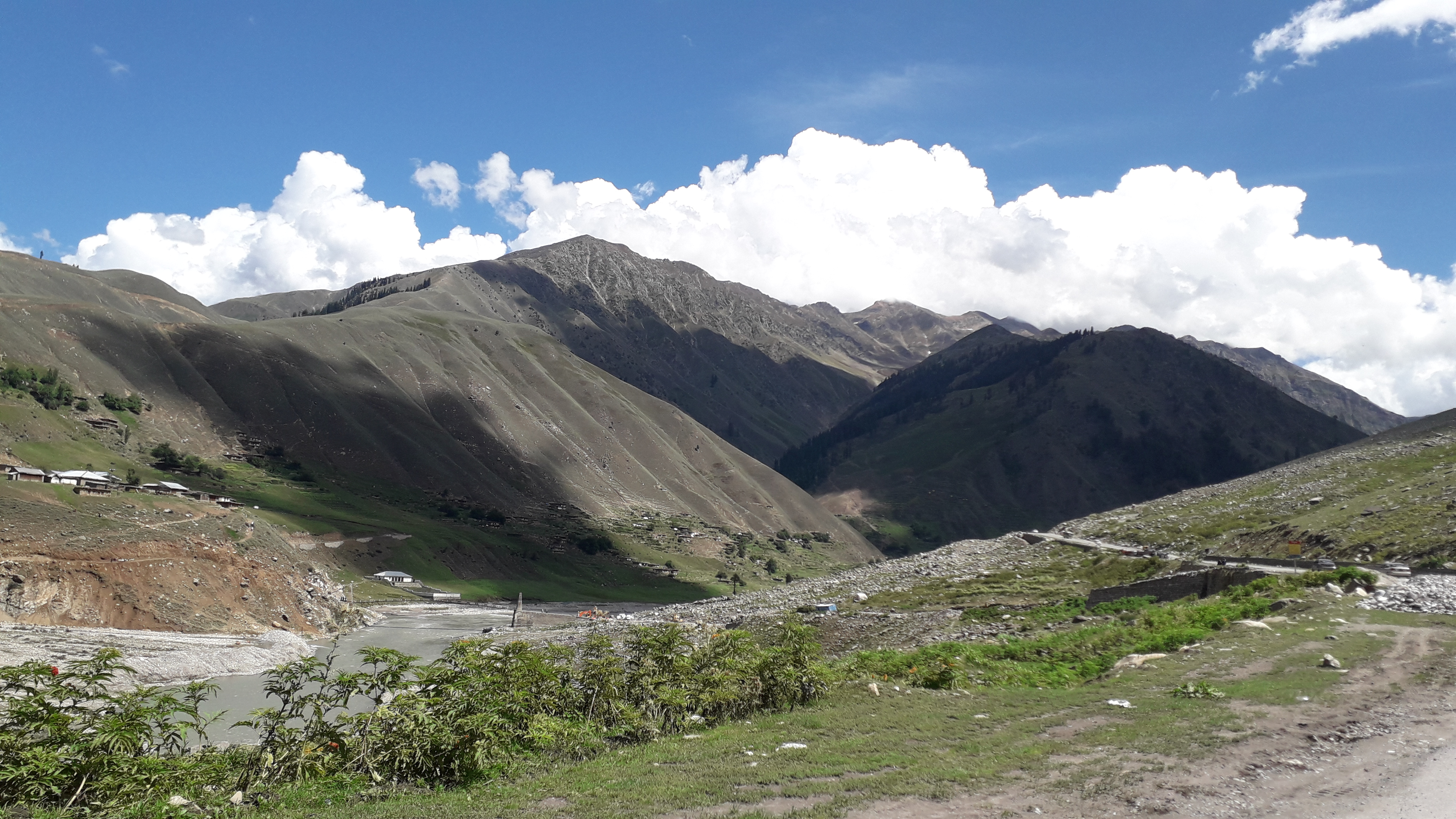

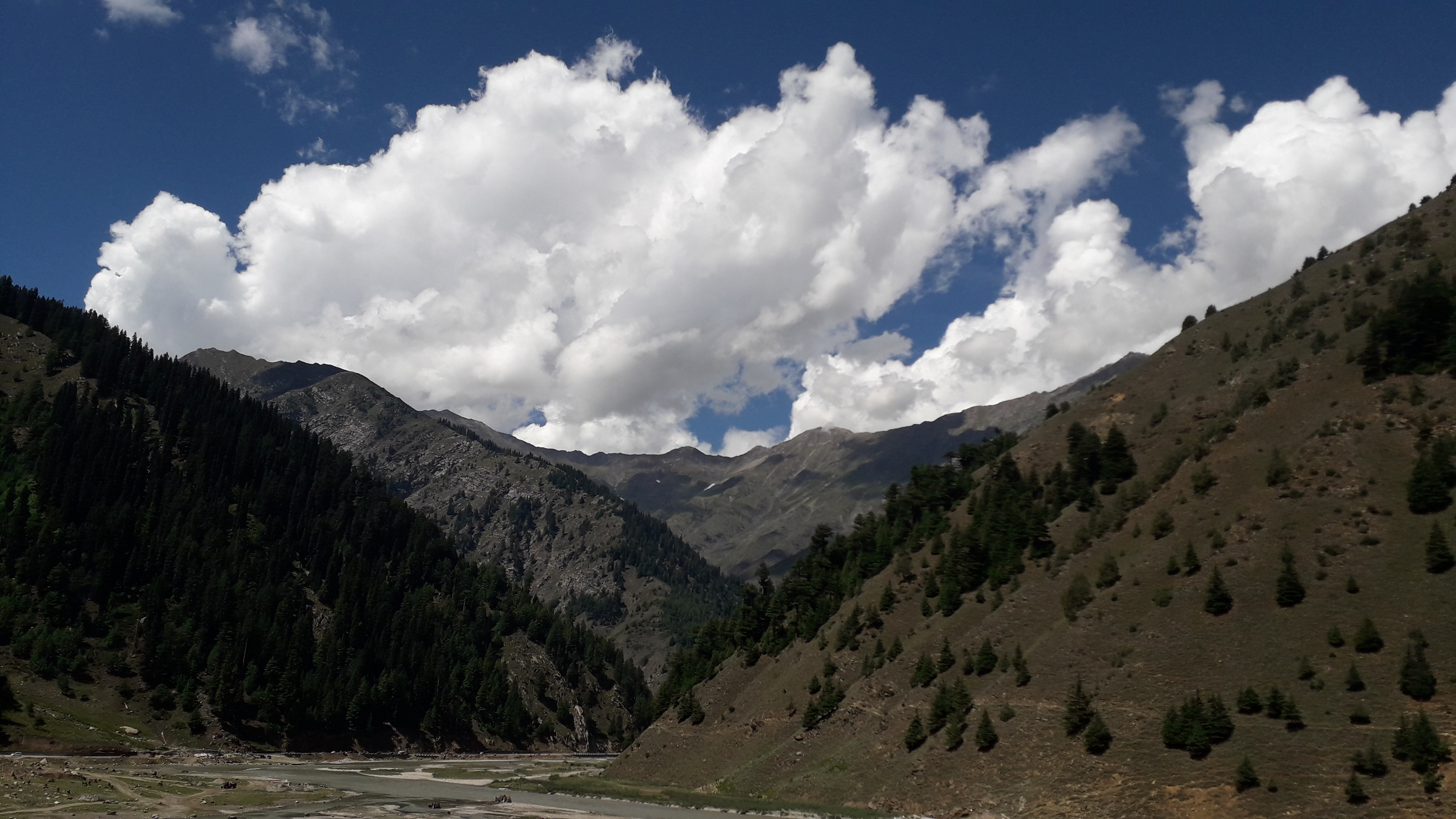

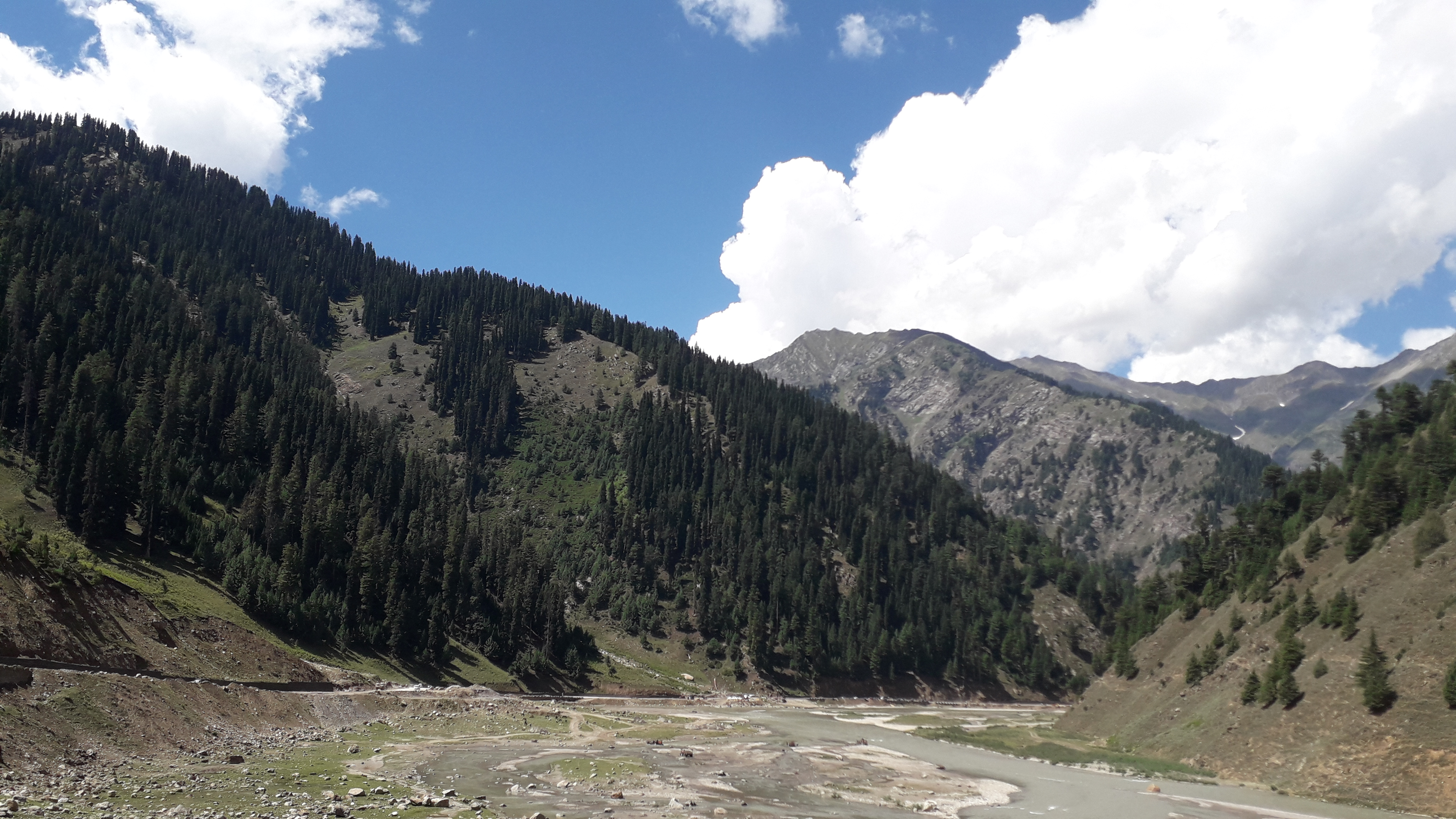

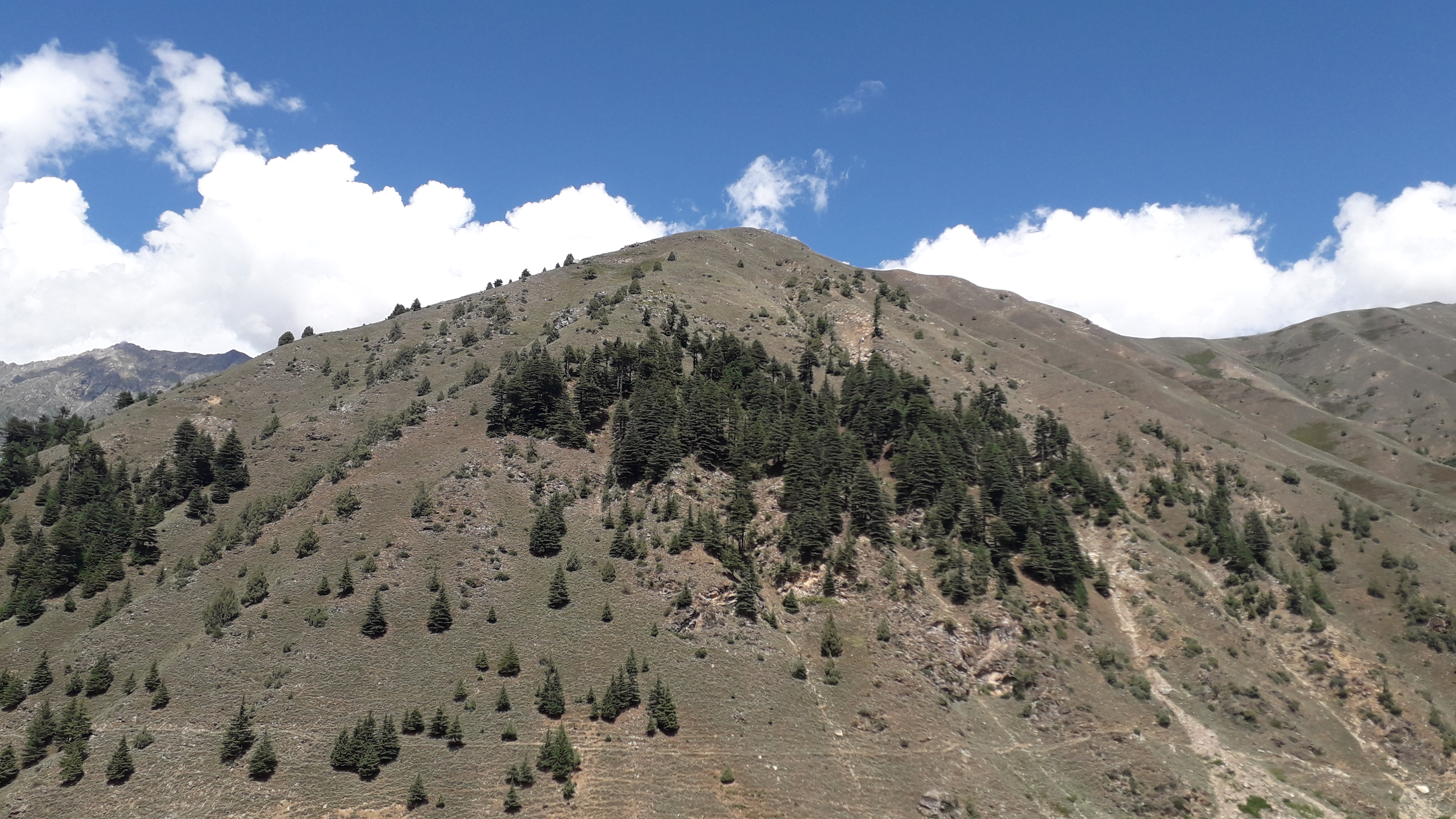

== See also ==
- Dudipatsar Trail
- Makra Peak
- Malika Parbat Peak
