= Besal, Khyber Pakhtunkhwa =

Coordinates: 35°3′7.93″N 73°56′9.96″E

Besal (Urdu: بیسل) is a village located in Kaghan Valley, Mansehra District of Khyber Pakhtunkhwa province of Pakistan. It sits 3260 meters above sea level, adjacent to the Kunhar River, about 45 kilometers north of Naran.

== Gallery ==
Images of Besal Village
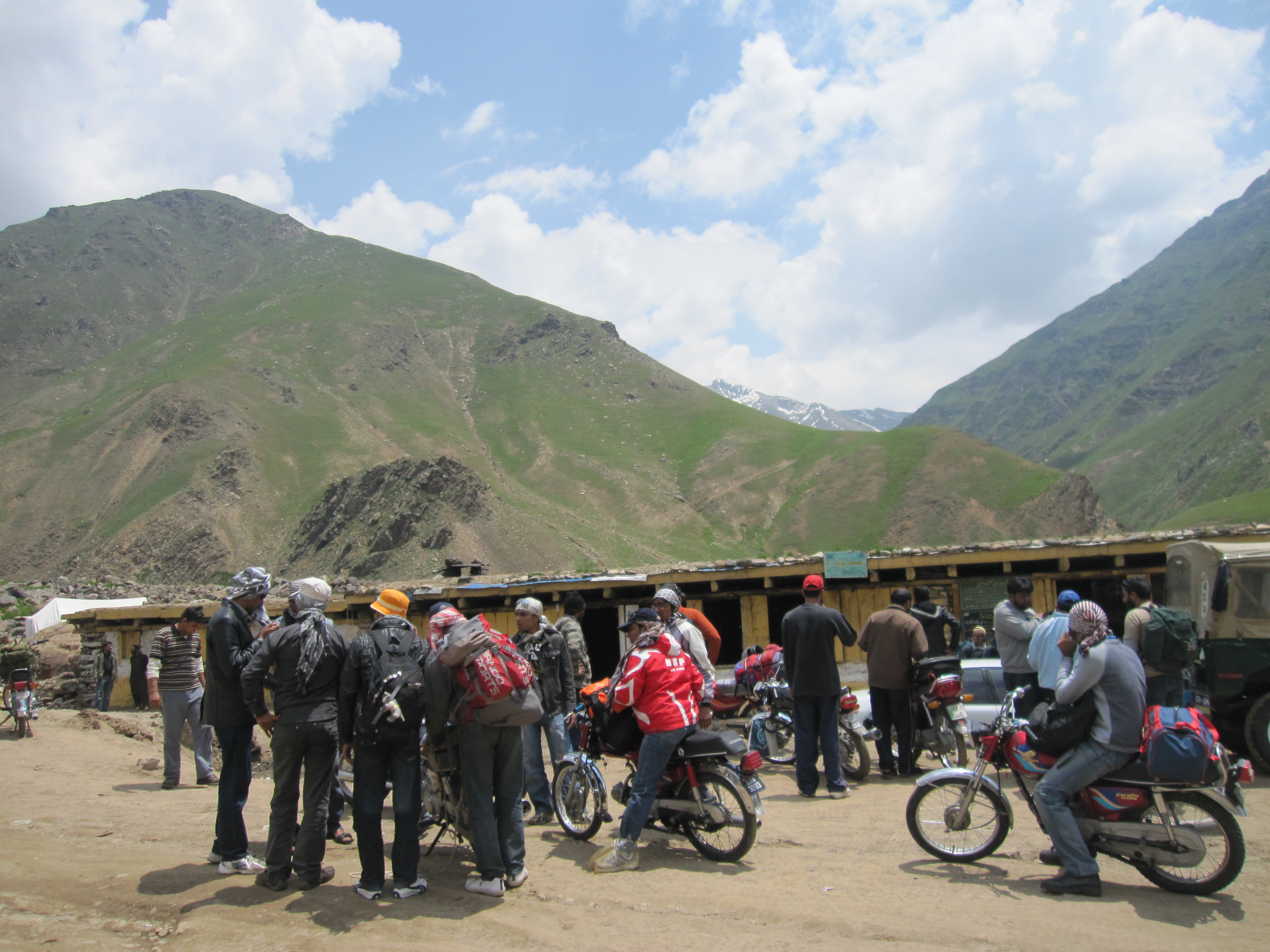
Bikers stopping at Besal en route to Lulusar Lake and Babusar Pass

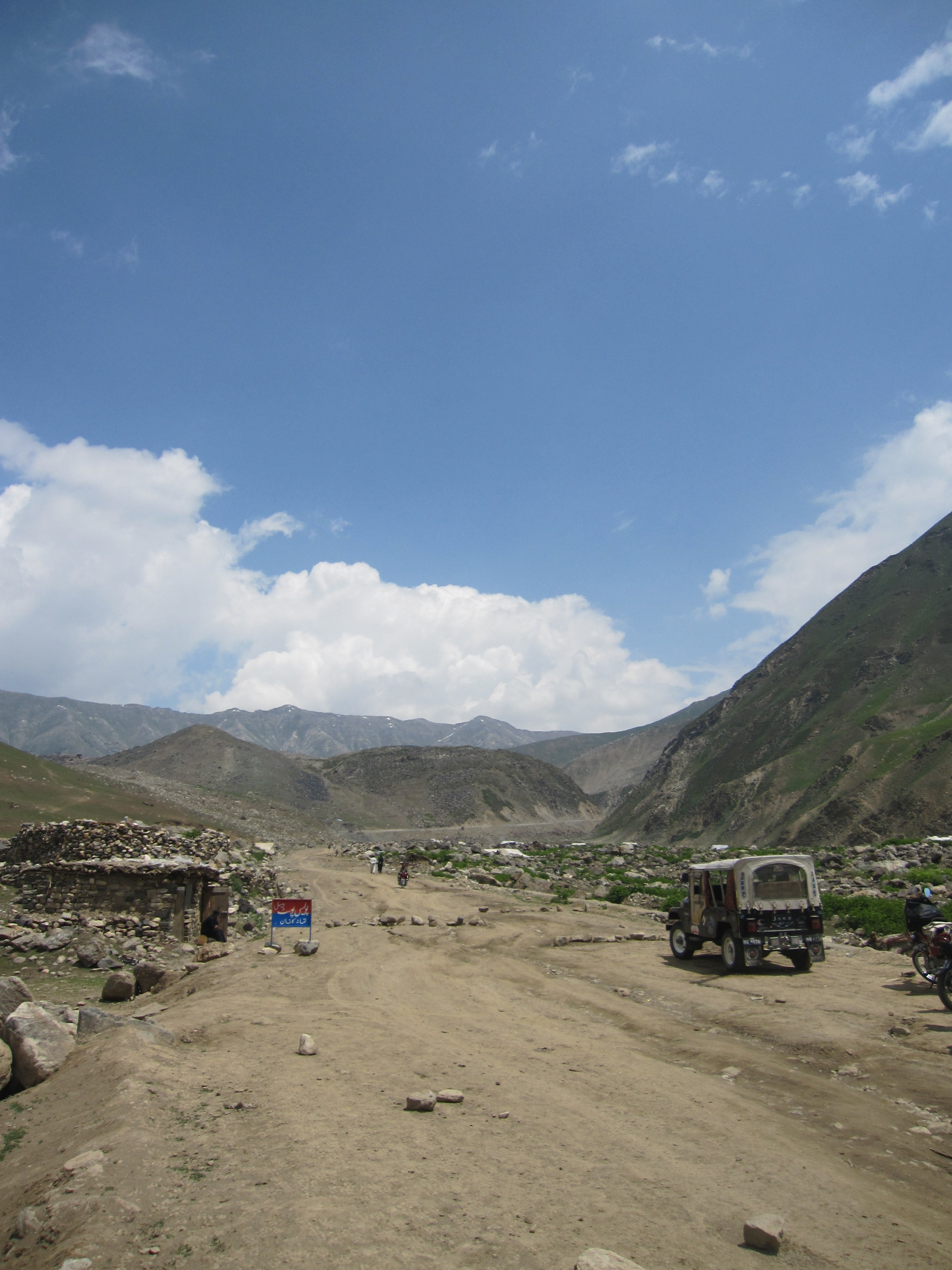
Police checkpoint at Besal
