= List of waterfalls in Pakistan =

Most of the waterfalls in Pakistan are found in the northern regions of the country, specially in the Hazara and Kohistan regions of Khyber Pakhtunkhwa and in its administrative portions of the Kashmir, Azad Kashmir and Gilgit-Baltistan. This list contains some of the well-known waterfalls in the country.

== List ==
Name	Image	Location	Administrative unit(s)	Ref.(s)
Cham Waterfall		Chinari, Jhelum Valley District	Azad Kashmir	
Chajian Waterfall		Chhajjian village, Haripur	Khyber Pakhtunkhwa	
Chotok Waterfalls		Moola Chotok, Khuzdar	Balochistan	
Dhani Waterfall		Nasirabad Tehsil, Neelum Valley	Azad Kashmir	
Gulpur Waterfalls		Kotli, Kotli District	Azad Kashmir	
Hanna-Urak Waterfall		Hanna Lake, Urak Valley	Balochistan	
Hazara Waterfalls		Jab Valley, Haripur District	Khyber Pakhtunkhwa	
Jamgar Waterfalls		Neelum Valley	Azad Kashmir	
Jarogo Waterfall		Matta Tehsil, Swat Valley	Khyber Pakhtunkhwa	
Khamosh Waterfall		Kharmang, Kharmang District	Gilgit-Baltistan	
Kamarkhwa Waterfalls		Mankyal, Swat Valley	Khyber Pakhtunkhwa	
Kotla Waterfalls		Kotla, Bagh District	Azad Kashmir	
Kohala Waterfall		Bagh District	Azad Kashmir	
Kanhati Waterfall		Soon Valley, Khushab District	Punjab	
Kutton Waterfalls		Kutton, Neelum Valley	Azad Kashmir	
Lamchar Waterfall		Darora, Upper Dir District	Khyber Pakhtunkhwa	
Manthokha Waterfall		Kharmang Valley, Skardu	Gilgit-Baltistan	
Matiltan Waterfall		Matiltan, Swat Valley	Khyber Pakhtunkhwa	
Machar Waterfall		Alpuri, Shangla District	Khyber Pakhtunkhwa	
Naltar Waterfall		Naltar Valley	Gilgit-Baltistan	
Neela Sandh Waterfall		Mouri Syedan, Rawalpindi District	Punjab	
Naran Kaghan Waterfalls		Kaghan Valley, Mansehra District	Khyber Pakhtunkhwa	
Nish Kapar Waterfall		Kokarai, Swat Valley	Khyber Pakhtunkhwa	
Noori Waterfall		Haripur	Khyber Pakhtunkhwa	
Sajikot Waterfall		Havelian Tehsil, Abottabad District	Khyber Pakhtunkhwa	
Shingrai Waterfall		Manglawar, Swat Valley	Khyber Pakhtunkhwa	
Patika Waterfall		Muzaffarabad District	Azad Kashmir	
Pir Ghaib Waterfall		Quetta	Balochistan	
Umbrella Waterfall		Sajikot, Abbottabad	Khyber Pakhtunkhwa	
Warghomo Kaar Waterfall		Gabina Jabba, Swat Valley	Khyber Pakhtunkhwa	

== See also ==
- List of waterfalls
- Tourism in Pakistan
  - List of lakes of Pakistan
  - List of valleys of Pakistan
  - List of hill stations in Pakistan
