= Chotok Waterfalls =

- آبشارهای چوتوک
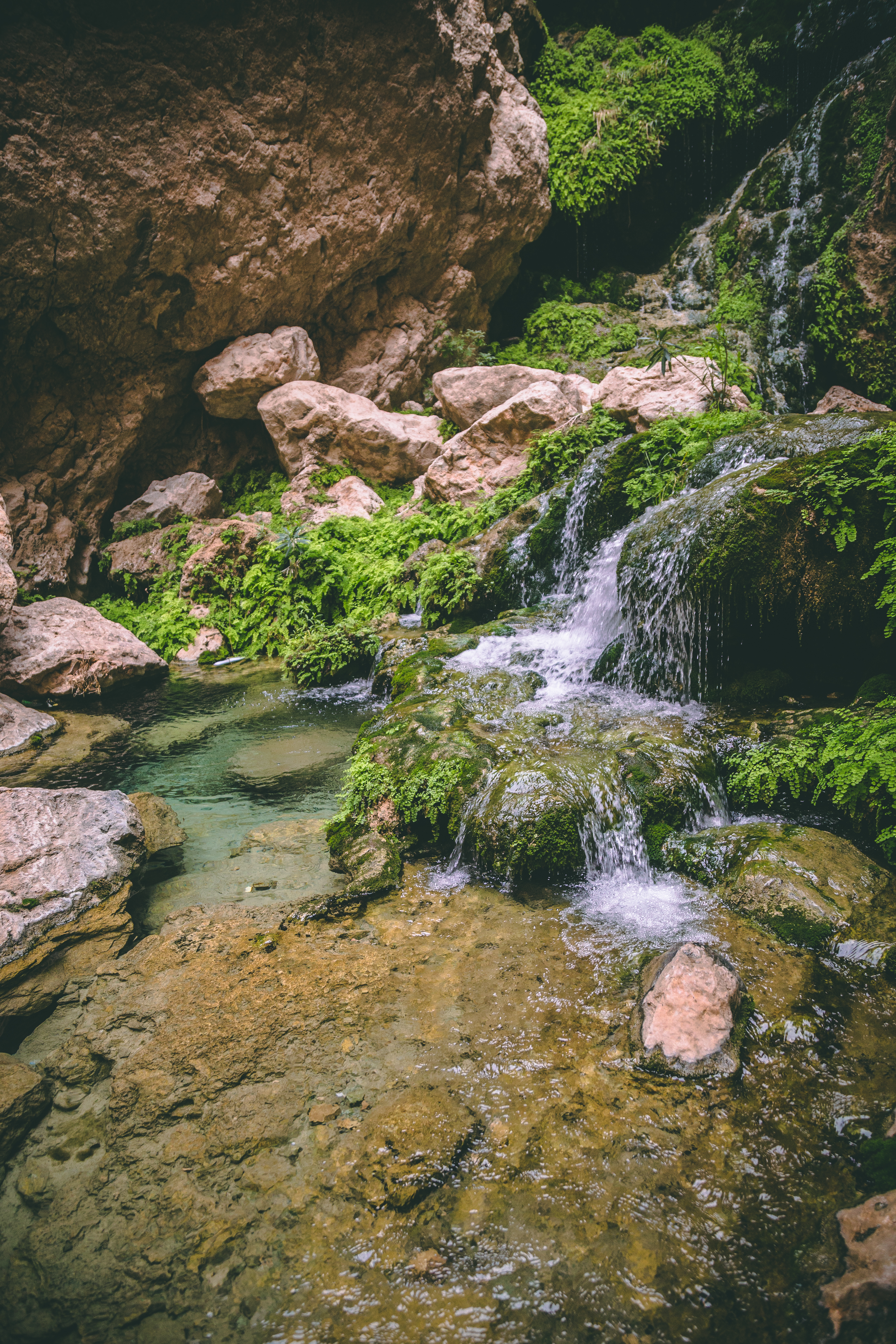
- Chotok Waterfalls
- Interactive map of Chotok Waterfalls
- Location: Moola Chotok, Khuzdar District, Balochistan, Pakistan
- Coordinates: 28.155832°N 67.126750°E
- Type: Cascade
- Elevation: 1,237 metres (4,058 ft)

Chotok Waterfalls, also known as Moola Chotok Waterfalls, are waterfalls situated in Moola village of Khuzdar District in Pakistan's Balochistan province. Moola is a village and tehsil of Khuzdar District which is about 106 kilometres (66 mi) away from Khuzdar city. Chotok Waterfalls plunge between two hills into a stream of cool water.

== See also ==
- Moola Chotok
- Hanna-Urak Waterfall
- List of waterfalls
- List of waterfalls of Pakistan
