= Urak Gate =

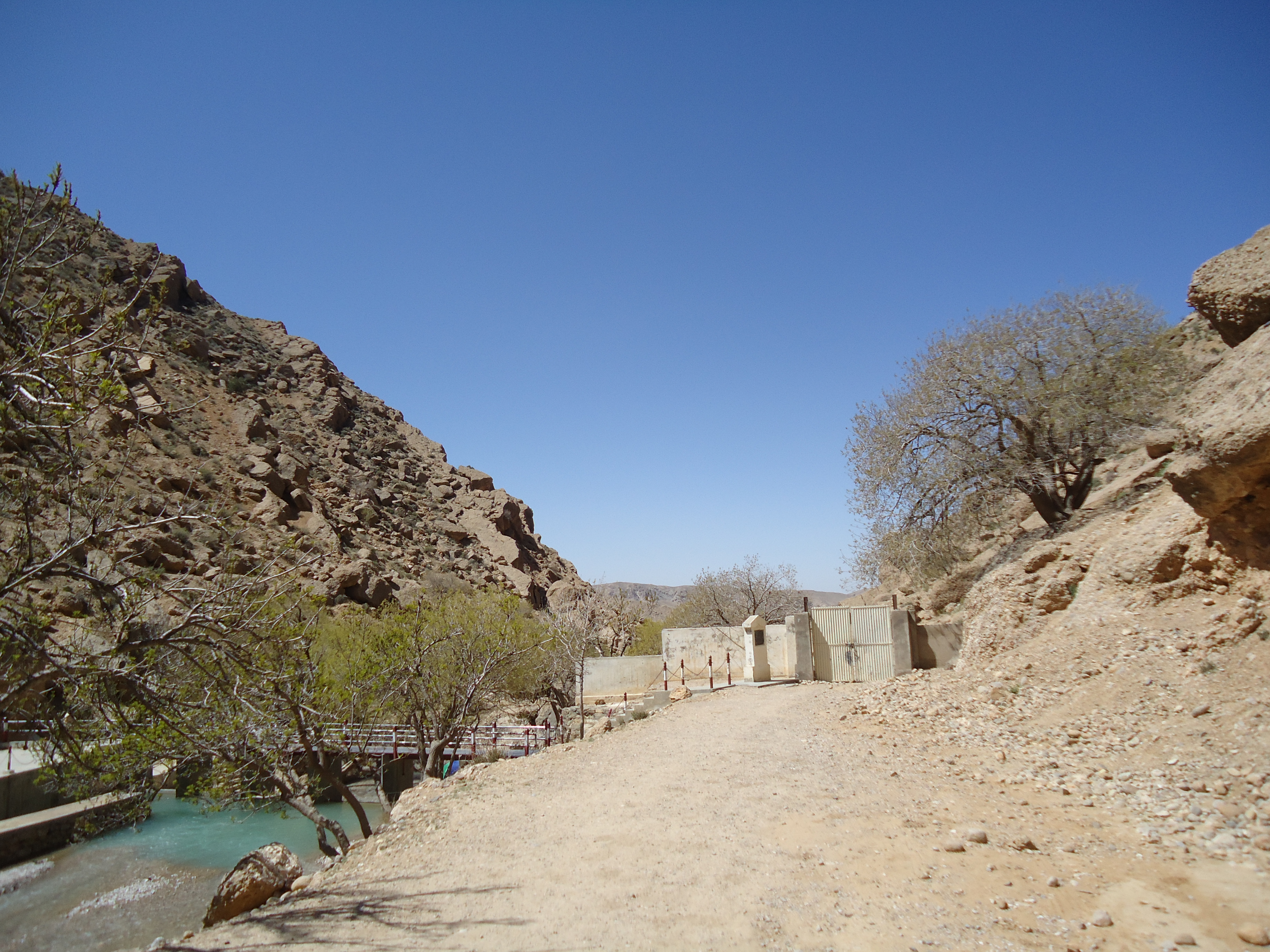
2nd Gate Urak

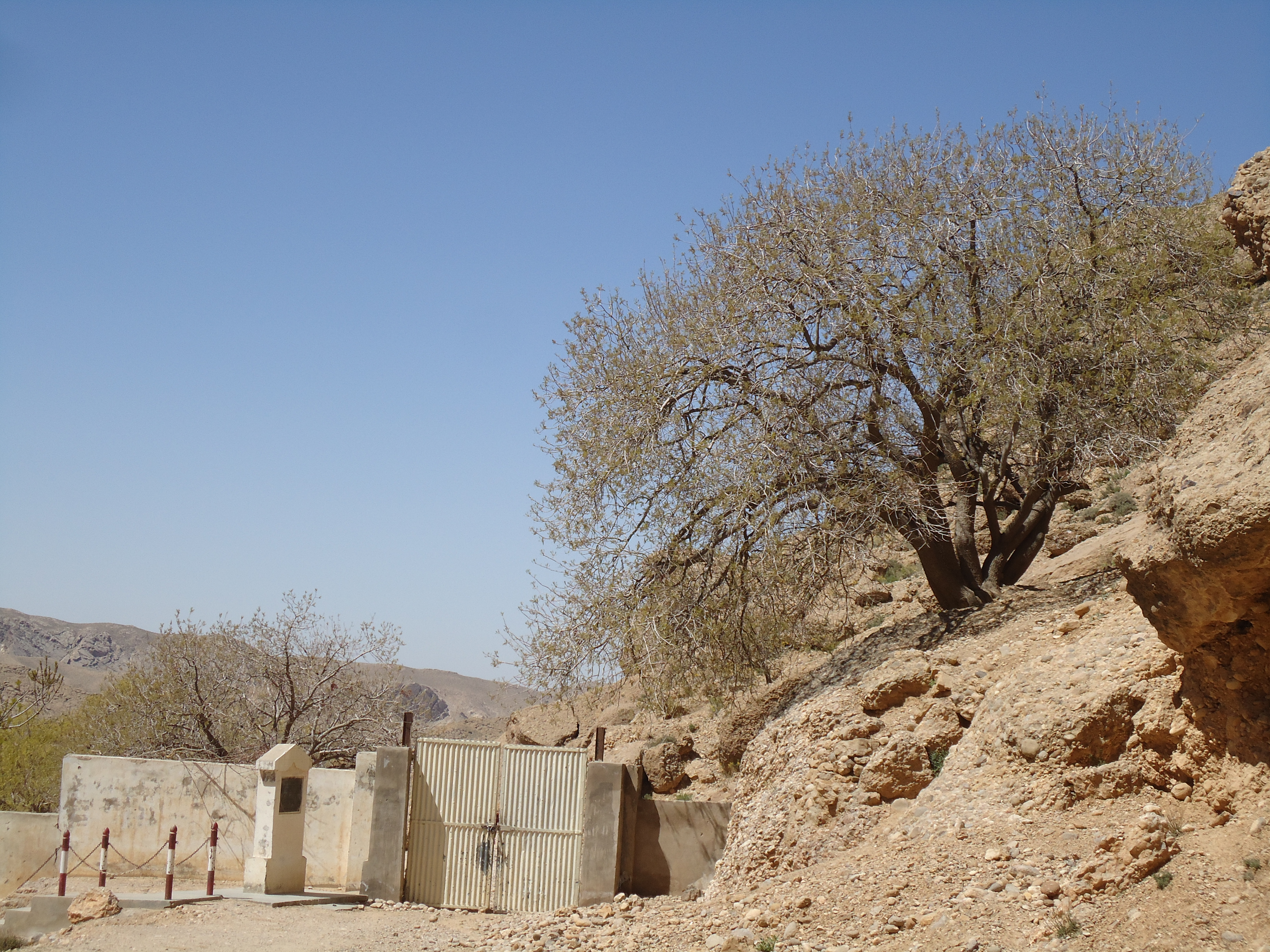
2nd Gate Urak

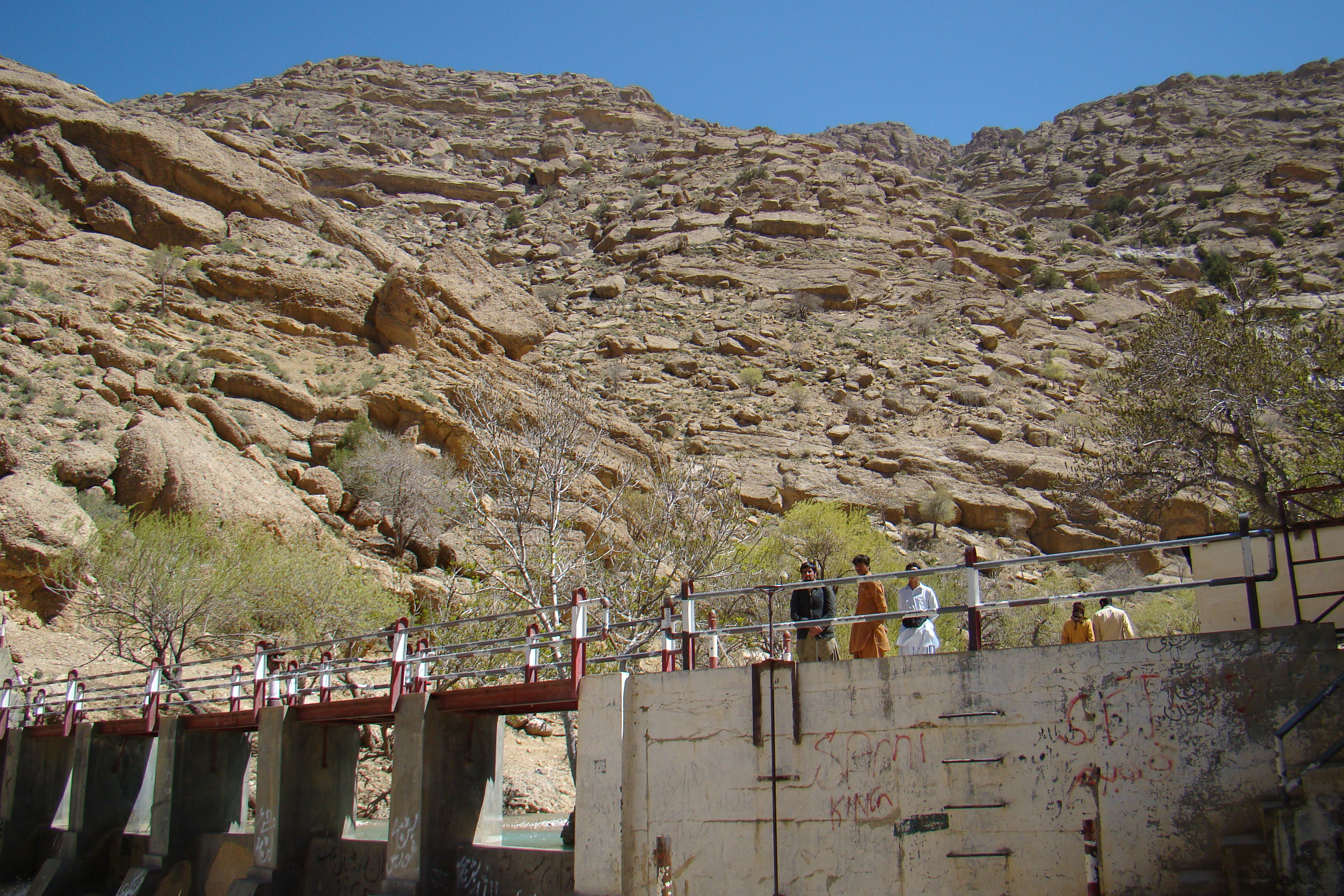
Bridge of 2nd Gate Urak

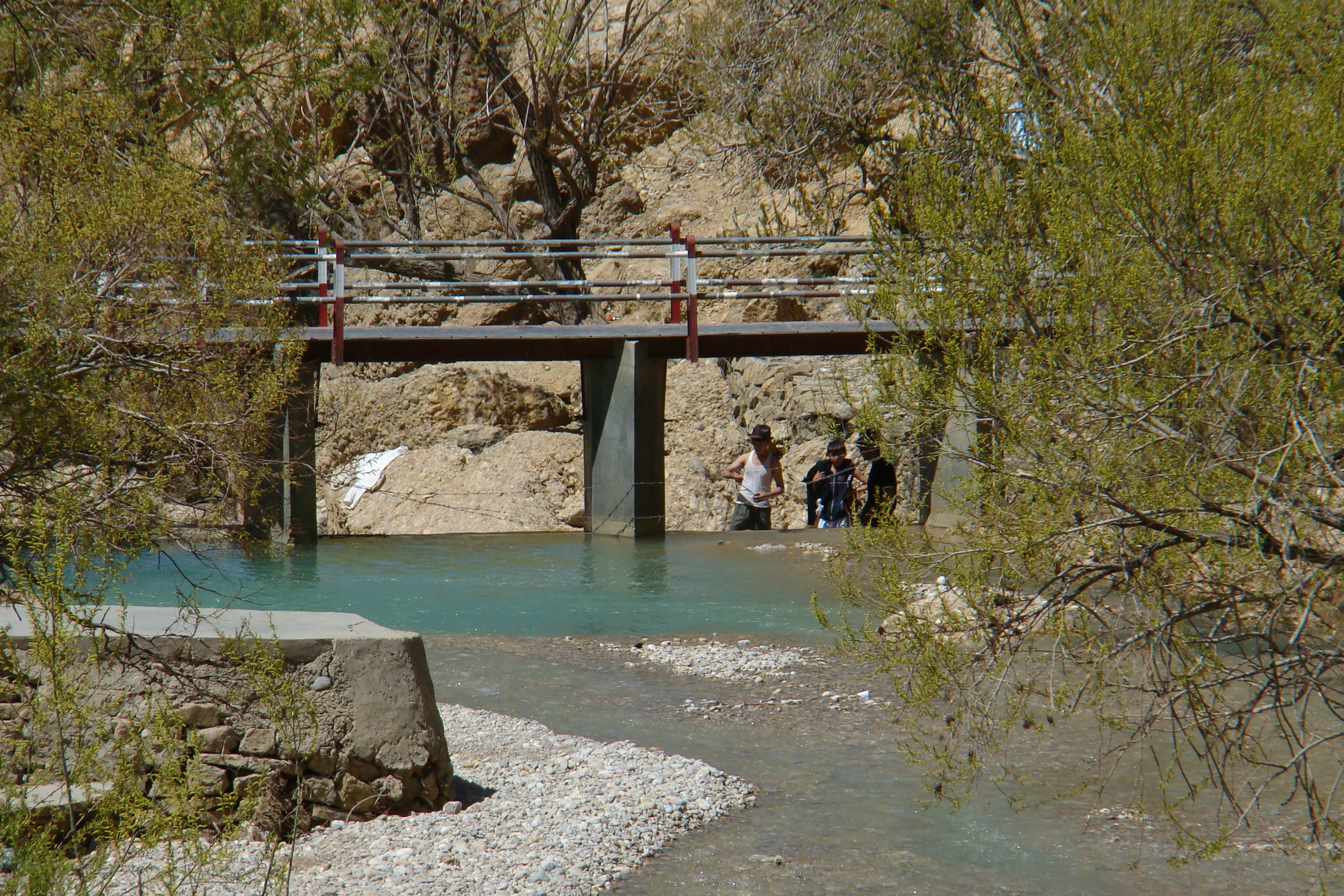
Bridge of 2nd Gate Urak

Urak Gate is the end of Urak Valley. A very natural place starts by entering Urak Gate. After 20 minutes walk there is the 2nd Urak Gate of Walli Tangi Road and after 2 hours walk Walli Tangi Dame reaches. Visitors without having Pass issued by Pakistan Army will unable to Enter the 2nd Gate of Urak Valley which is issuing by Cantonment Bord Quetta.
