= Hanna-Urak Waterfall =

Waterfall in Urak Valley, Pakistan

- آبشار هانا اوراک
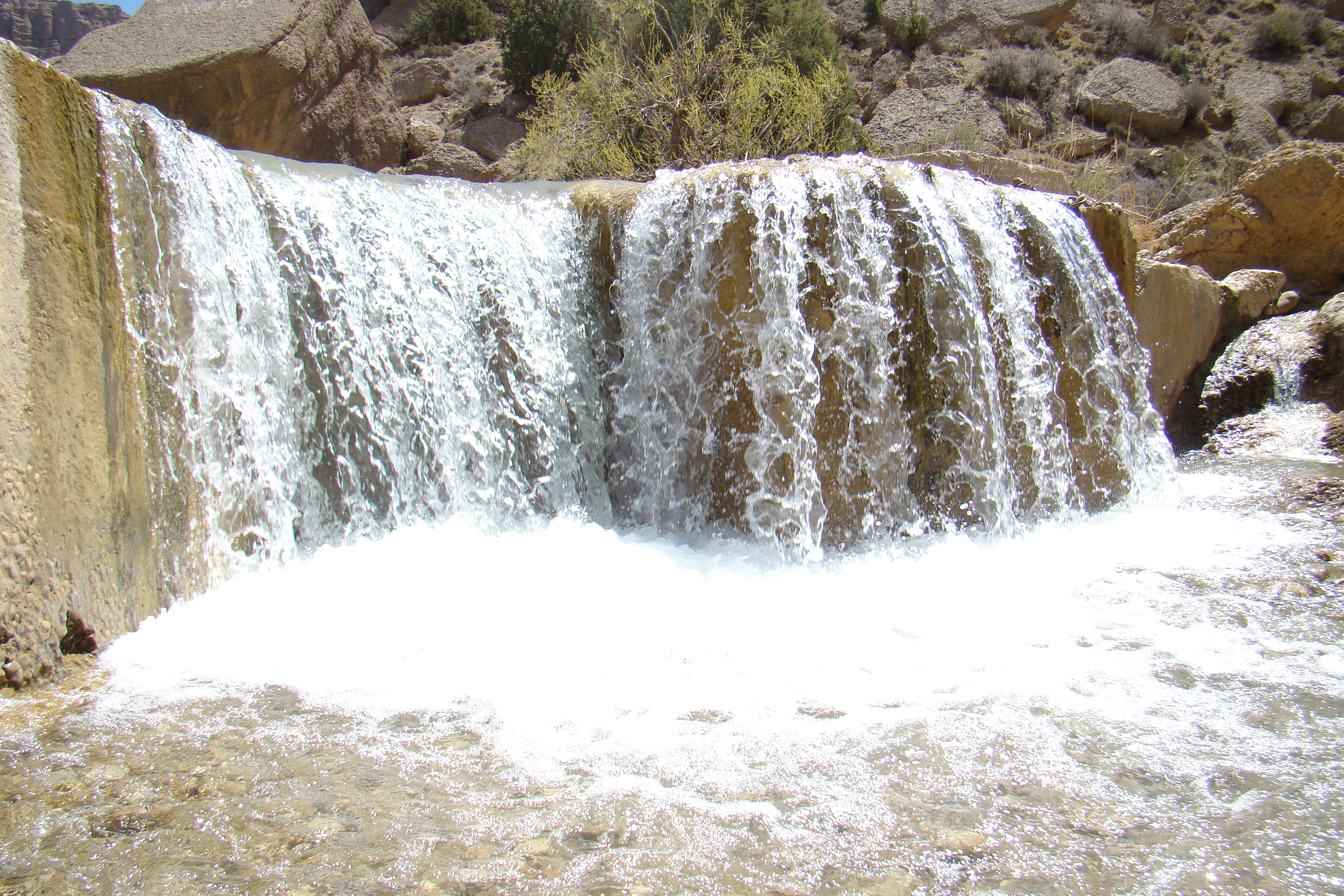
- Hanna-Urak Waterfall in Quetta District
- Interactive map of Hanna-Urak Waterfall
- Location: Quetta District, Balochistan, Pakistan
- Coordinates: 30.275515°N 67.192217°E

Hanna-Urak Waterfall is a waterfall located near Hanna Lake in Urak Valley, Quetta District of Balochistan the province of Pakistan. It is a small waterfall surrounded by mountains of the Zarghoon Range. The waterfalls at the end of Urak Valley marks entrance to the adjacent Wali Tangi Dam.

== See also ==
- Urak Valley
- List of waterfalls
- List of waterfalls of Pakistan
