= Wali Tangi Dam =

Dam in Quetta, Balochistan, Pakistan

- Interactive map of Wali Tangi Dam
- Country: Pakistan
- Coordinates: 30.2624°N 67.2433°E
- Designed by: Pakistan Army

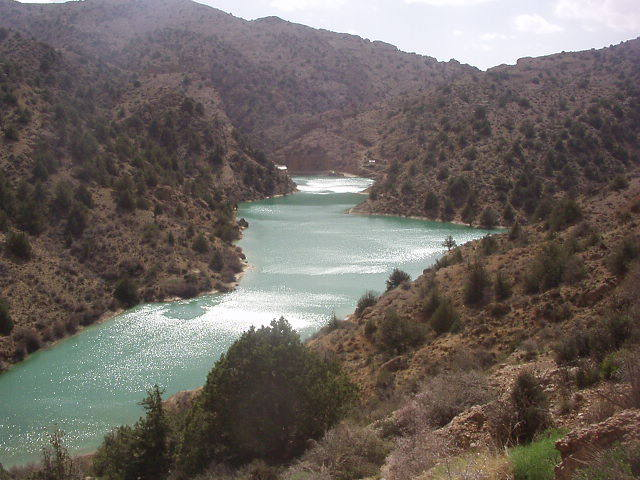
Wali Tangi Dam

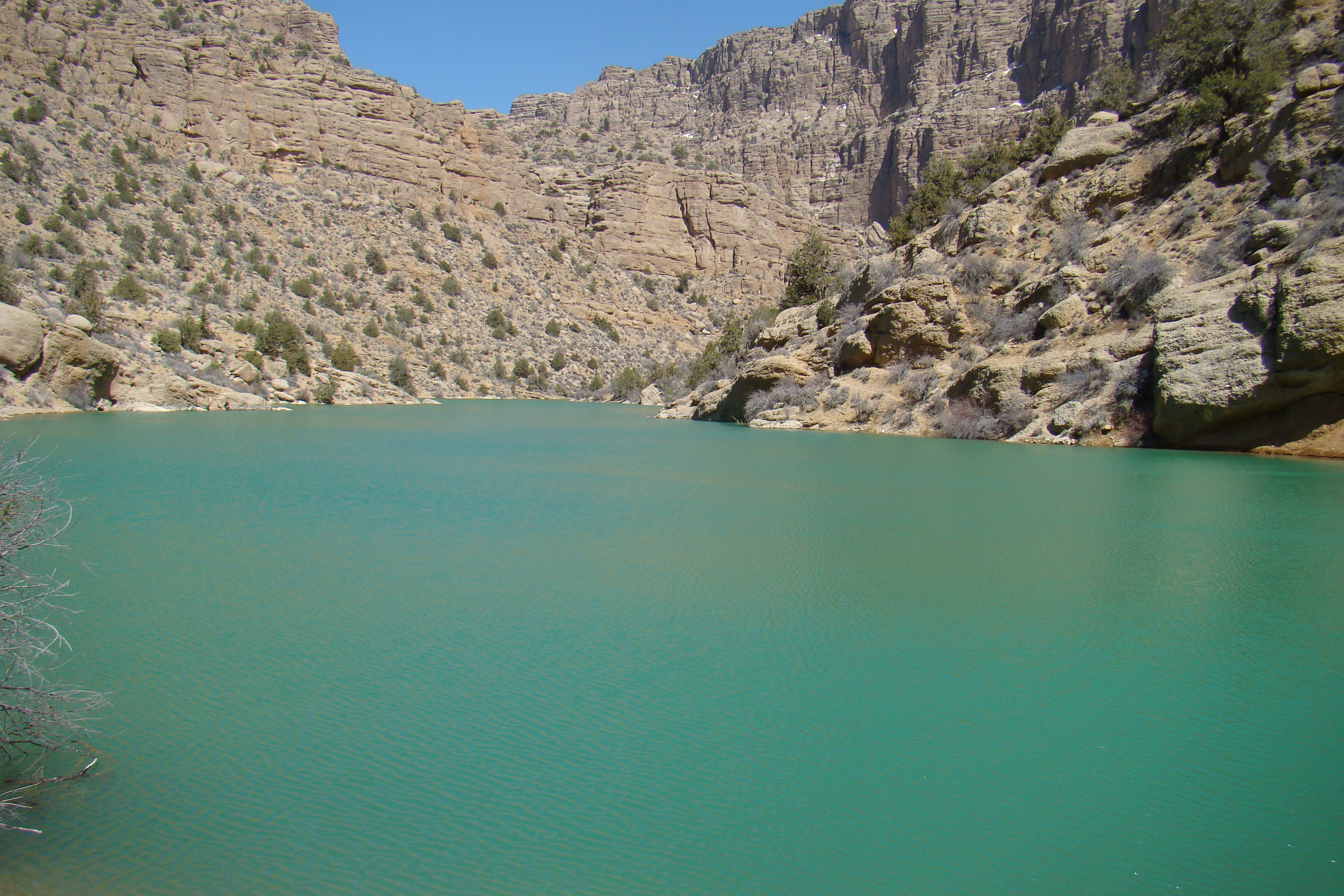
Wali Tangi Dam

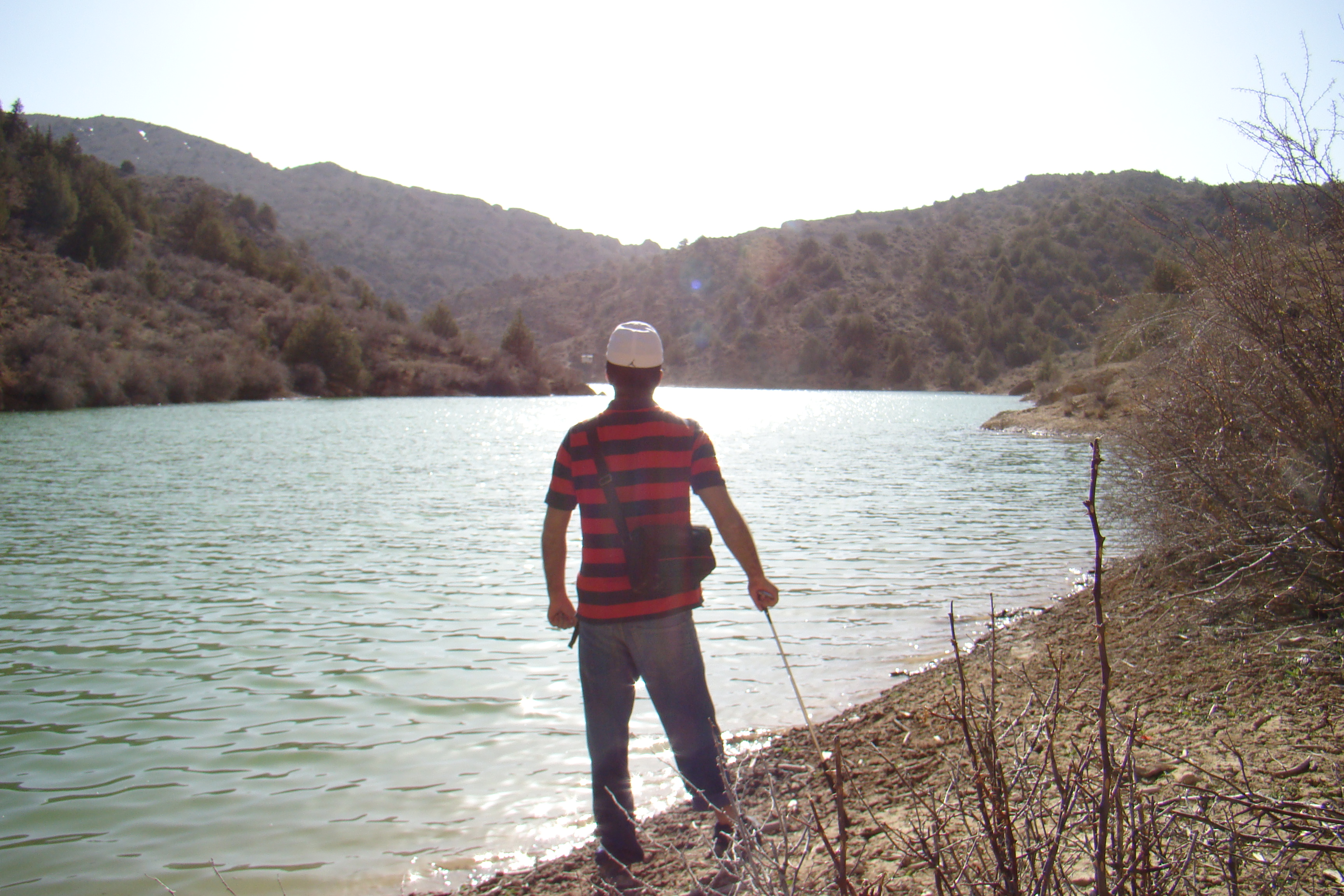
Wali Tangi Dam

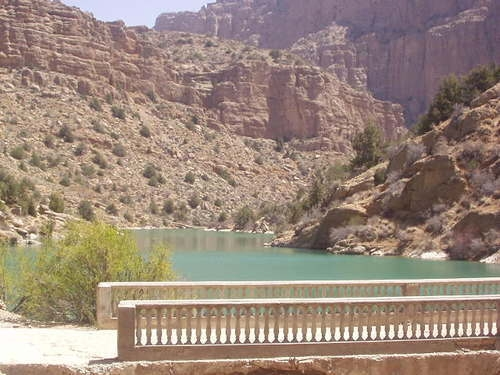
Wali Tangi Dam

Wali Tangi Dam is a small dam in the Urak Valley in Balochistan province of Pakistan. It is situated approximately 20 km (12 mi) east of Quetta at an elevation of approximately 2,550 m (8,350 ft).

Wali Tangi Dam was constructed by the Pakistan Army in the early 1960s to supply clean water to Urak Valley and Quetta for irrigation and human consumption. The dam stores and utilizes fresh water from melting snows in the surrounding Zarghoon mountains, which are part of the Sulaiman Mountains.

== See also ==
- List of dams and reservoirs in Pakistan

== Sources ==
- Pervaiz Iqbal Cheema, "The Armed Forces of Pakistan", Allen & Unwin, 2002
- Raymond A. Moore, Jr., "The Use of the Army in Nation-Building: The Case of Pakistan", Asian Survey, Vol. 9, No. 6 (Jun., 1969), pp. 447–456
