= Noori waterfall =

Waterfall in Haripur, Khyber Pakhtunkhwa

Noori Waterfall
- نوری آبشار
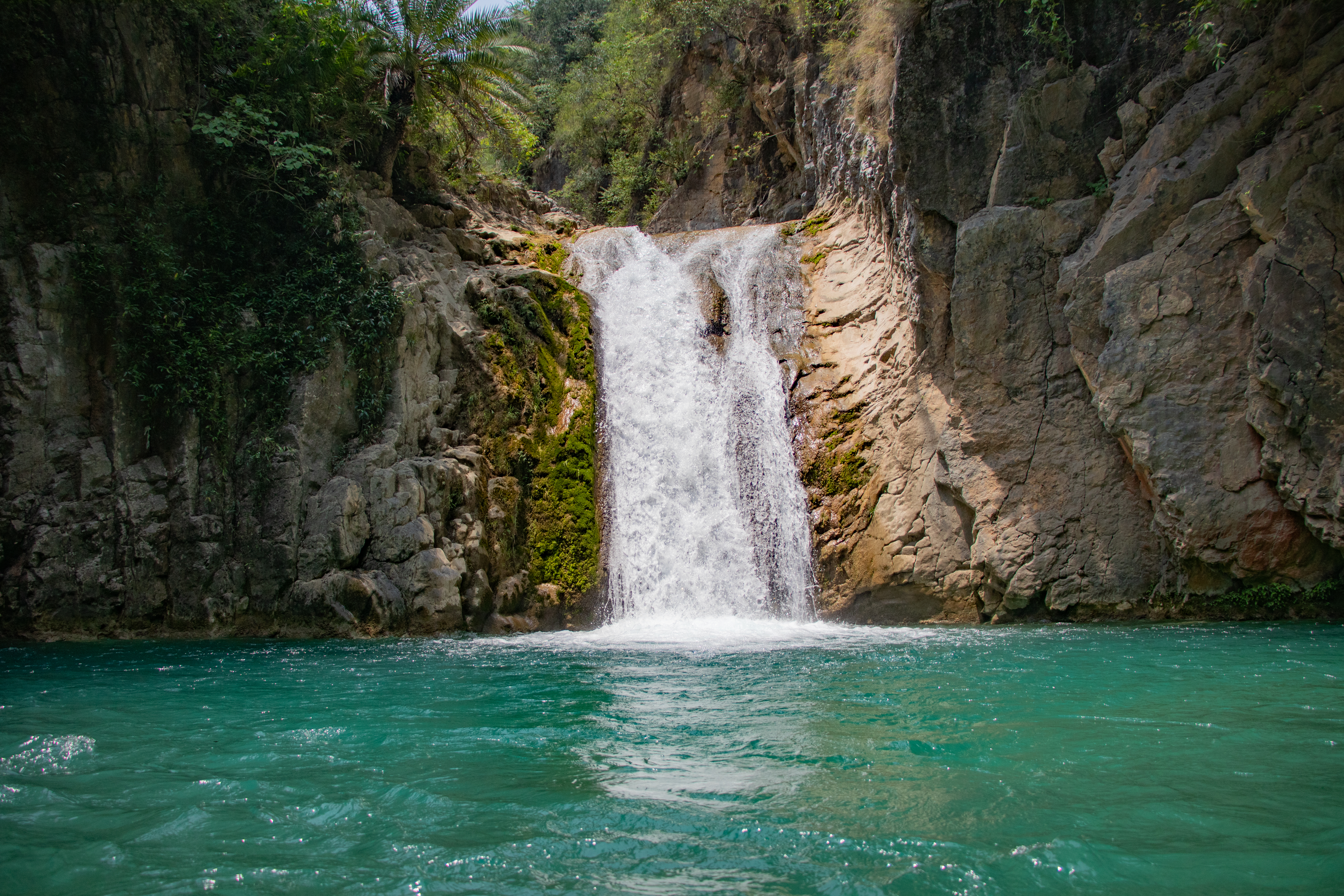
- A view of Noori Waterfall
- Interactive map of Noori Waterfall
- Location: Haripur, Haripur District, Khyber Pakhtunkhwa, Pakistan
- Coordinates: 33.893504°N 73.117348°E
- Type: Punchbowl
- Number of drops: 1

The Noori waterfall is located in Tial village, Haripur District of Khyber Pakhtunkhwa province of Pakistan. It is located on the Haro River, about 54 kilometres (34 mi) away from Islamabad, and about 60 kilometres (37 mi) from the district headquarters. It attracted the attention of tourists in the summer of 2020 after some hikers visited it and shared its pictures and videos on social media.

The waterfall is approximately 30 metres in height, and is located in an open cove-like formation on the side of a hill. The waterfall is small in height and has a clear blue water stream. The water drops into a turquoise pond measuring approximately 24 by 36 metres. The cove is filled with waist-deep water with a sandy floor which is deeper on the edges.

== Etymology ==
Locally, the waterfall is known as ‘Noori de tahand’ (Noori’s pond). There are several accounts as to how it got its name. The elders of neighboring villages attribute it to a woman named Noor Bibi, who drowned in the plunge pool of the waterfall. Others say the waterfall received its name because of its milky appearance at night. However, some think a tribe named Noori, now extinct, is the basis for the waterfall's name.

== See also ==
- List of waterfalls in Pakistan
