= Chajian Waterfall =

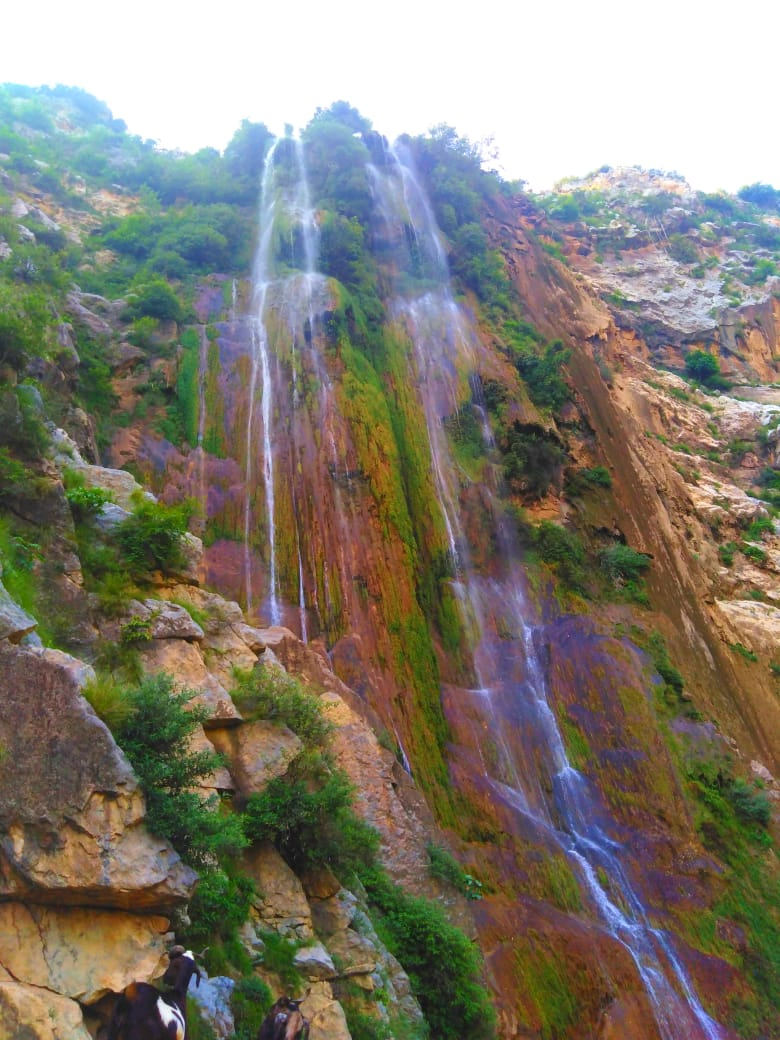
- A view of Chajian Waterfall
- Interactive map of Chajian Waterfall
- Location: Haripur, Haripur District, Khyber Pakhtunkhwa, Pakistan
- Coordinates: 34.0717288°N 72.7877863°E
- Total height: 400 ft (120 m)

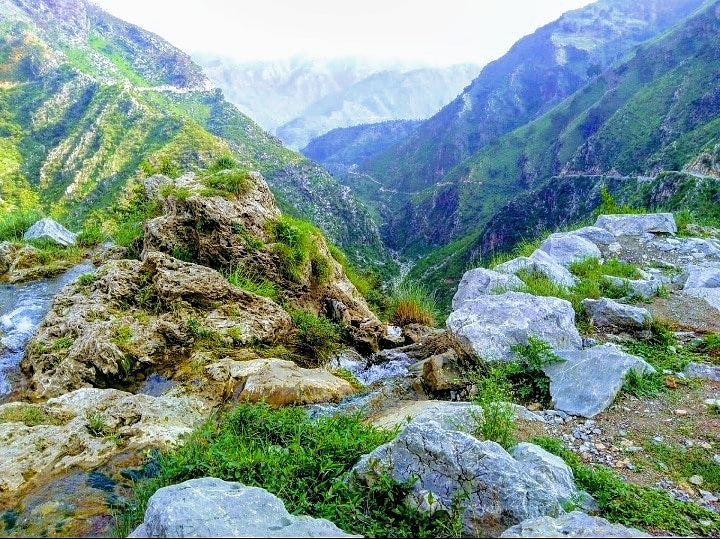
Mountainous view of Chajian Village

Chajian Waterfall is a waterfall located in Chhajjian village, Haripur District of Khyber Pakhtunkhwa province in Pakistan. It is located about 25 kilometres (16 mi) from the city of Haripur.

The waterfall is 120 metres (400 feet) in height and is the tallest waterfall in the Hazara Division. The district’s highest peak, Siribang, overlooks the waterfall, which is fed by natural springs.

== See also ==
- List of waterfalls
- List of waterfalls of Pakistan
