= Umbrella Waterfall =

Waterfall in Abbottabad District, Pakistan

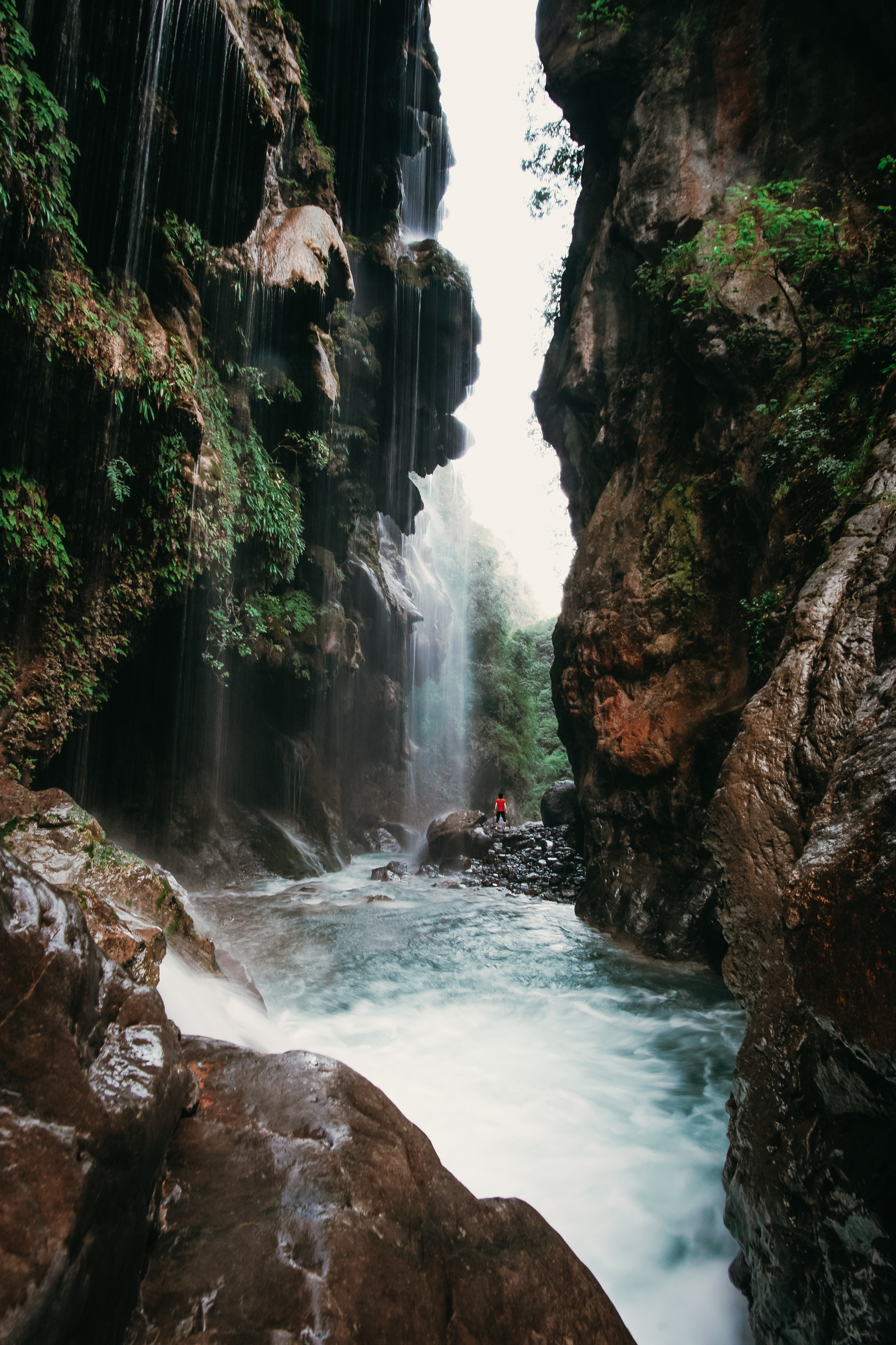
Photograph of Umbrella Waterfall in Sajikot Area of District Abbottabad, KPK, Pakistan - Photo by Shams Shaukat Films

Umbrella Waterfall is a waterfall located in the Sajikot area of Abbottabad District in the Khyber Pakhtunkhwa province of Pakistan. It has emerged as a tourist attraction relatively recently. The waterfall is located 27 kilometers from Havelian.

== See also ==
- List of waterfalls
- List of waterfalls of Pakistan
