= Manthokha Waterfall =

Waterfall in Gilgit-Baltistan, Pakistan

- Manthoka Waterfall
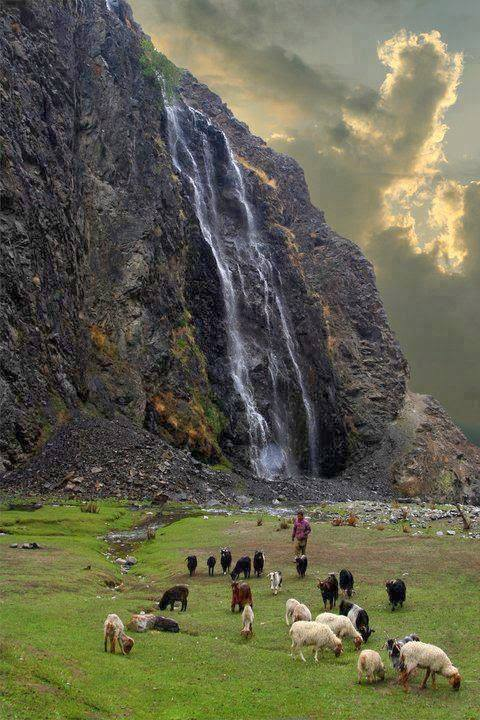
- Manthoka Waterfall with local herder with sheep.
- Interactive map of Manthokha Waterfall
- Location: Manthokha Baltistan, Kharmang Valley, Gilgit-Baltistan, Pakistan
- Coordinates: 35.06°N 75.92°E
- Total height: 55 m
- Watercourse: Indus Valley

Manthokha Waterfall also spelt Manthoka Waterfall, is a waterfall located in the Kharmang Valley, Skardu, in Gilgit-Baltistan, in the extreme northern region of Pakistan. The waterfall has surface height of approximately180 feet (55 m), and located at a distance of around 80 kilometres (50 mi) from Skardu, the largest city of Gilgit Baltistan.

== Tourism ==
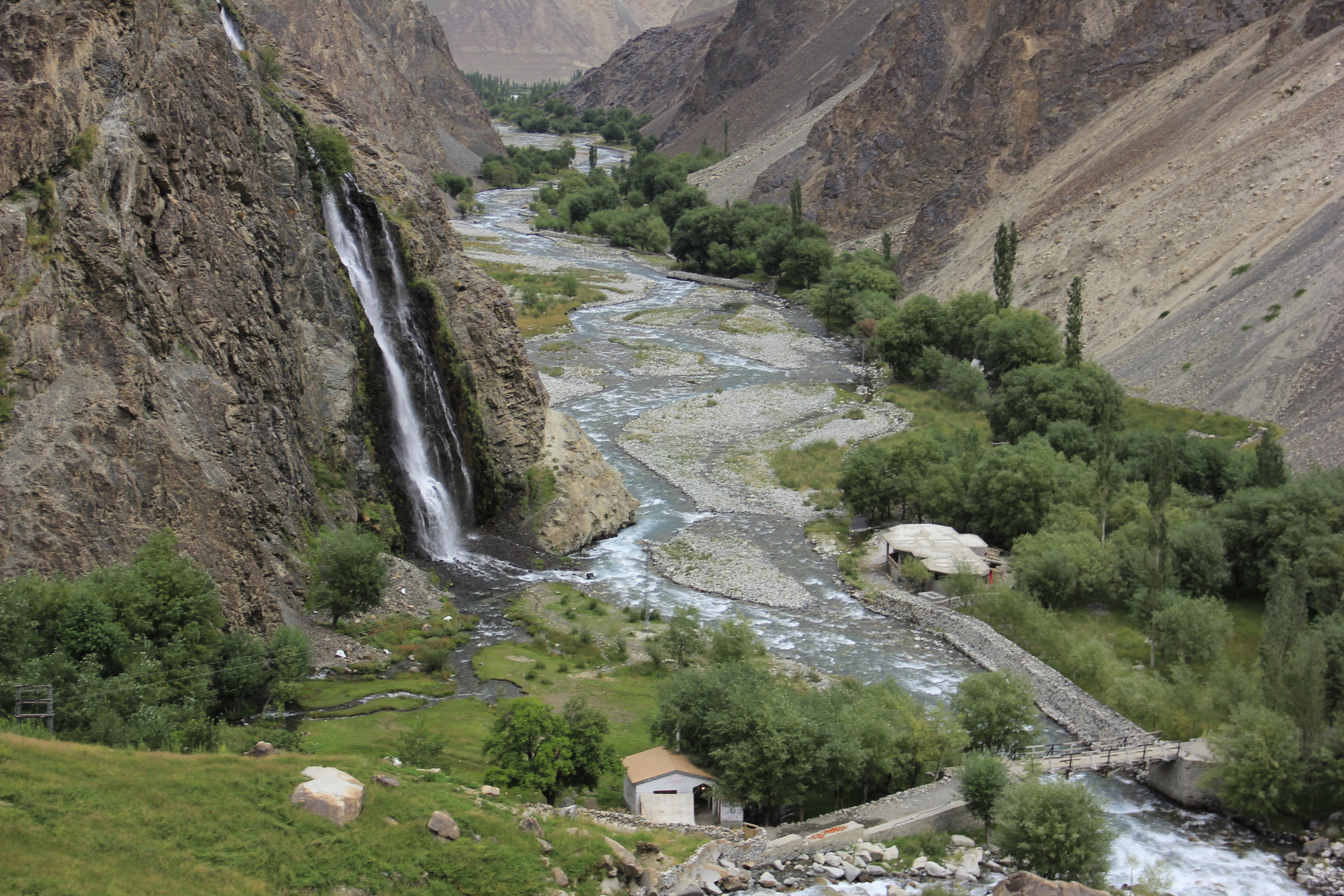
An aerial view of the waterfall

The waterfall is set in green pastures, with streams, amid the towering Karakorum mountains. A nearby restaurant serves local trout fish, and sightseers can also visit the fish farm.

== See also ==
- List of waterfalls
- List of waterfalls of Pakistan
