= Pir Ghaib Waterfall =

Pir Ghaib Waterfalls
- پیر غیب کا آبشار
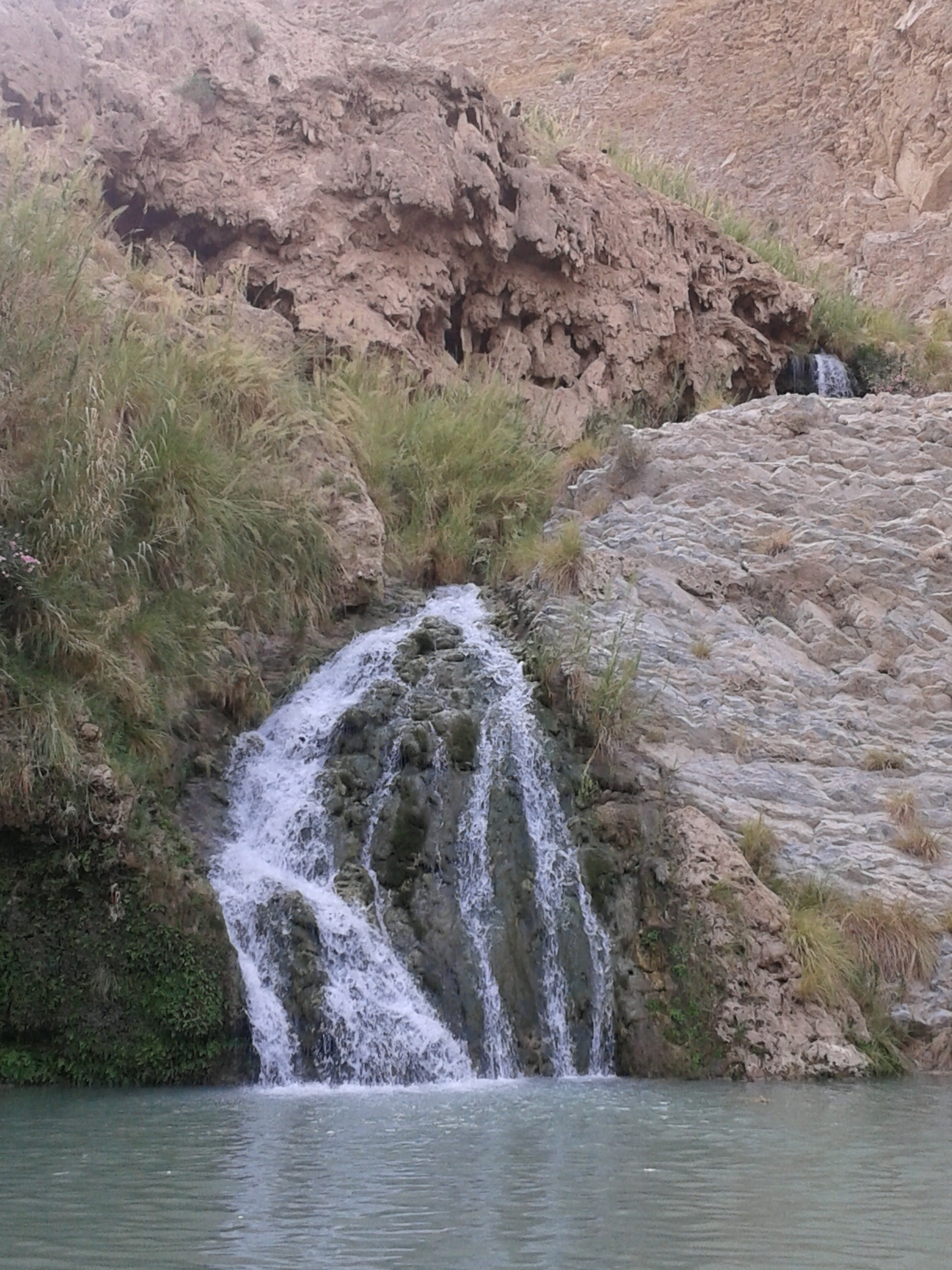
- Pir Ghaib Waterfalls in Bolan
- Interactive map of Pir Ghaib Waterfalls
- Location: Bolan, Balochistan, Pakistan
- Coordinates: 29.76°N 67.29°E
- Type: Cascade
- Total height: 15 metres
- Number of drops: 2

Pir Ghaib Waterfall is situated in the Bolan Valley, 70 kilometres (43 mi) from Quetta, in Balochistan, Pakistan. The waterfall cascades down rocky mountainside, making its way through many streams and ponds among the shady palm trees.

== History ==
Legend relates that Pir Ghaib and his sister, the venerable Bibi Nani, arrived here to convert the locals in the early days of Islam. But the fire worshippers sent an army after the pious pair. In the gorge of the Bolan, the siblings split; Bibi Nani went down the gorge (her purported tomb is under a bridge about 15 km downstream) while her brother fled into this arid landscape with the army in hot pursuit. At the head of the gorge, seeing that he was blocked by the rock wall, the saint prayed to almighty to be rescued. He cleaved the rock to receive the holy man. So, he was known as Pir Ghaib – The Invisible Saint.

Local Hindus worship Pir Ghaib as Mahadev. But, long before the Bolan gorge had rung with Vedic hymns or invocations of the Pir Ghaib, travellers and traders from the Indus Valley would have stopped at this spring sacred to their own gods on the first leg of their long journey to Mesopotamian marts. As the Vedic God Shivaderives from an earlier Indus Valley deity, and as the 5000 year old goddess Nania evolves into Bibi Nani or Durga, so too did the Pir Ghaib develop from an early Indus Valley god. But until the Indus script is understood we will not know which from this pantheon was celebrated for walking into rock walls.

== See also ==
- List of waterfalls
- List of waterfalls in Pakistan
