= Sajikot Waterfall =

Waterfall in Khyber Pakhtunkhwa, Pakistan

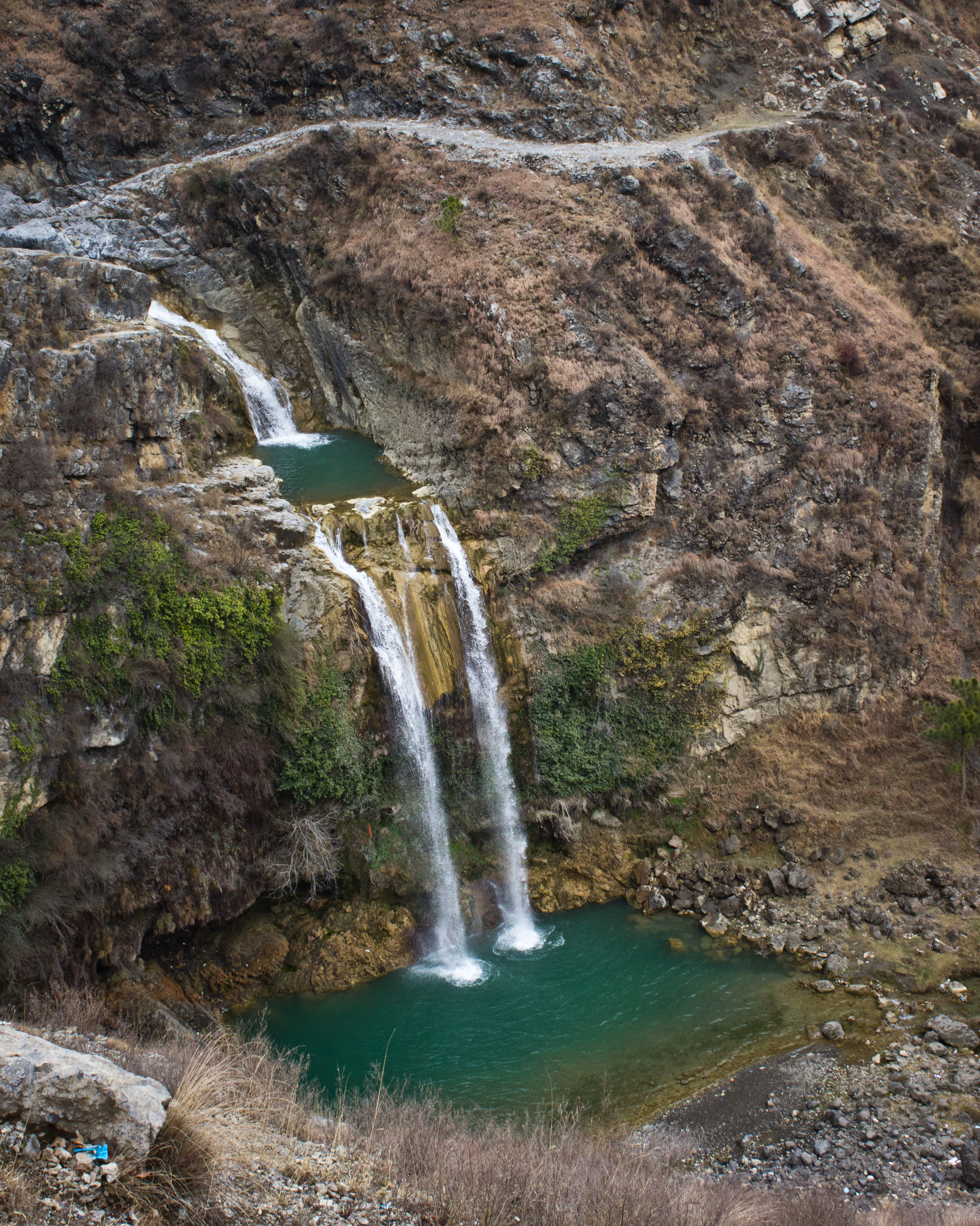
- Sajikot Waterfall, Abbottabad District
- Interactive map of Sajikot Waterfall
- Location: Havelian Tehsil, Abbottabad, Khyber Pakhtunkhwa, Pakistan
- Coordinates: 34.001104°N 73.278766°E
- Type: Plunge pool
- Total height: 200 ft (61 m)

Sajikot Waterfall is a waterfall located in Havelian Tehsil, Abbottabad District, in Pakistan's Khyber Pakhtunkhwa Province. It is a popular tourist destination and a picnic spot during summer in Abbottabad District. It is about 27 kilometres (17 mi) from Havelian and 40 kilometres (25 mi) from Abbottabad District. A newly constructed narrow road from Havelian to Sajikot allows visitors to take their cars very close to the crest of the waterfall.

In July 2019, the district administration of Abbottabad imposed a ban on bathing at the Sajikot Waterfall pool. The reason given was that the water of plunge pool was unwholesome for both the humans and animals.

== See also ==
- List of waterfalls
- List of waterfalls of Pakistan
