= Dhani Waterfall =

Waterfall in Neelum Valley, Pakistan

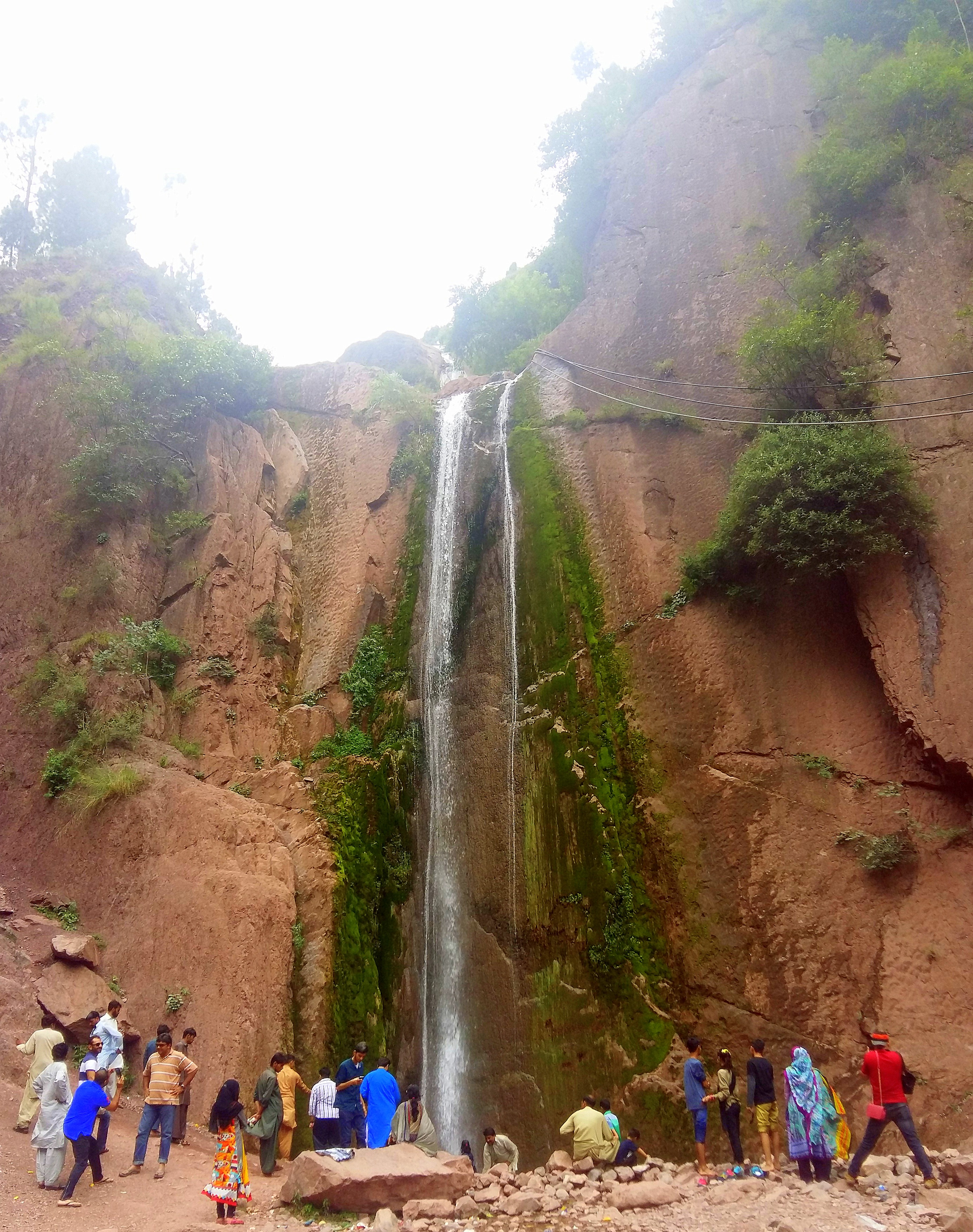
- Dhani Waterfall in Neelum Valley
- Interactive map of Dhani Waterfall
- Location: Muzaffarabad District, Neelum Valley, Azad Kashmir, Pakistan
- Coordinates: 34.424293°N 73.691351°E
- Elevation: 1,092 metres (3,583 ft)
- Total height: 15 metres (49 ft)

Dhani Waterfall also known as Dhani Noseri Waterfall is located in Nasirabad tehsil in Neelum Valley of Azad Kashmir in Pakistan. It is situated at distance of 38 kilometres (24 mi) from Muzaffarabad District. It is the highest waterfall in Neelum Valley.

In July 2024, an accident took place near the waterfall's location when a tourist van plunged into a ravine leaving two tourists dead and four injured. All were transferred to Nasirabad Tehsil Hospital.

== See also ==
- Neelum Valley
- List of waterfalls
- List of waterfalls in Pakistan
