= Neela Sandh Waterfall =

- آبشار نیلا ساندھ
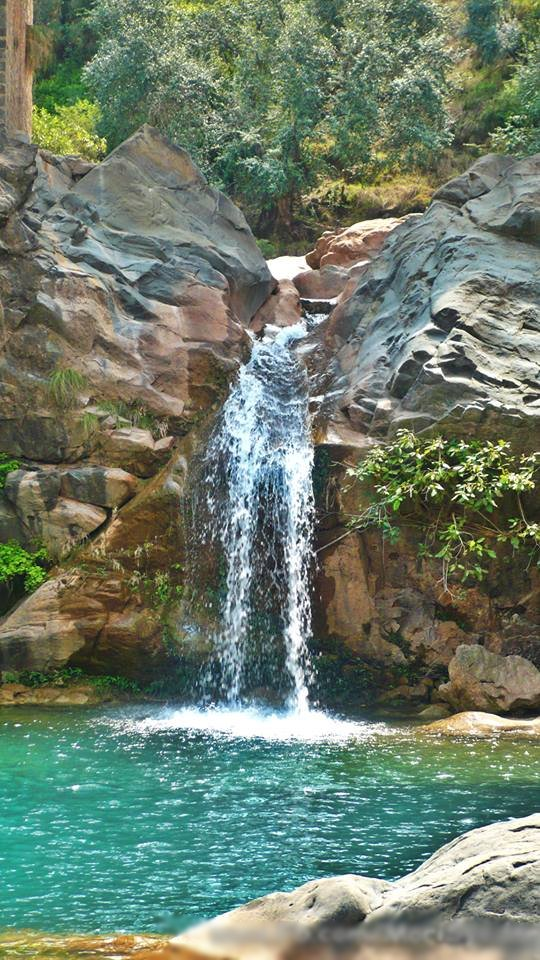
- Neela Sandh Waterfall, Rawalpindi District
- Interactive map of Neela Sandh Waterfall
- Location: Mouri Syedan, Rawalpindi District, Punjab, Pakistan
- Coordinates: 33.66149°N 73.384519°E

Neela Sandh (English: Blue Puddle) is a waterfall in Mouri Syedan, Rawalpindi District of Punjab in Pakistan. It is 44 kilometres (27 mi) away from Islamabad. It is surrounded by greenery, tall trees and extensive lush green mountains. It is a small waterfall with a clear, bluish water stream. It has a depth of 7 to 24 metres.

== See also ==
- List of waterfalls
- List of waterfalls of Pakistan
