= Kotla Waterfalls =

Waterfall in Azad Kashmir, Pakistan

Kotla Waterfall (آبشار کوتلا) is a waterfall located in Kotla, a village in northern Bagh District of Azad Kashmir. A popular tourist destination, the waterfall is located at a height of 1,767 metres (5,798 ft) above sea level.

== See also ==
- List of waterfalls
- List of waterfalls of Pakistan
