= Hanna Lake =

Hanna Lake ہنہ جھيل ہنا جھیل د هانا جهیل جهیل هانا
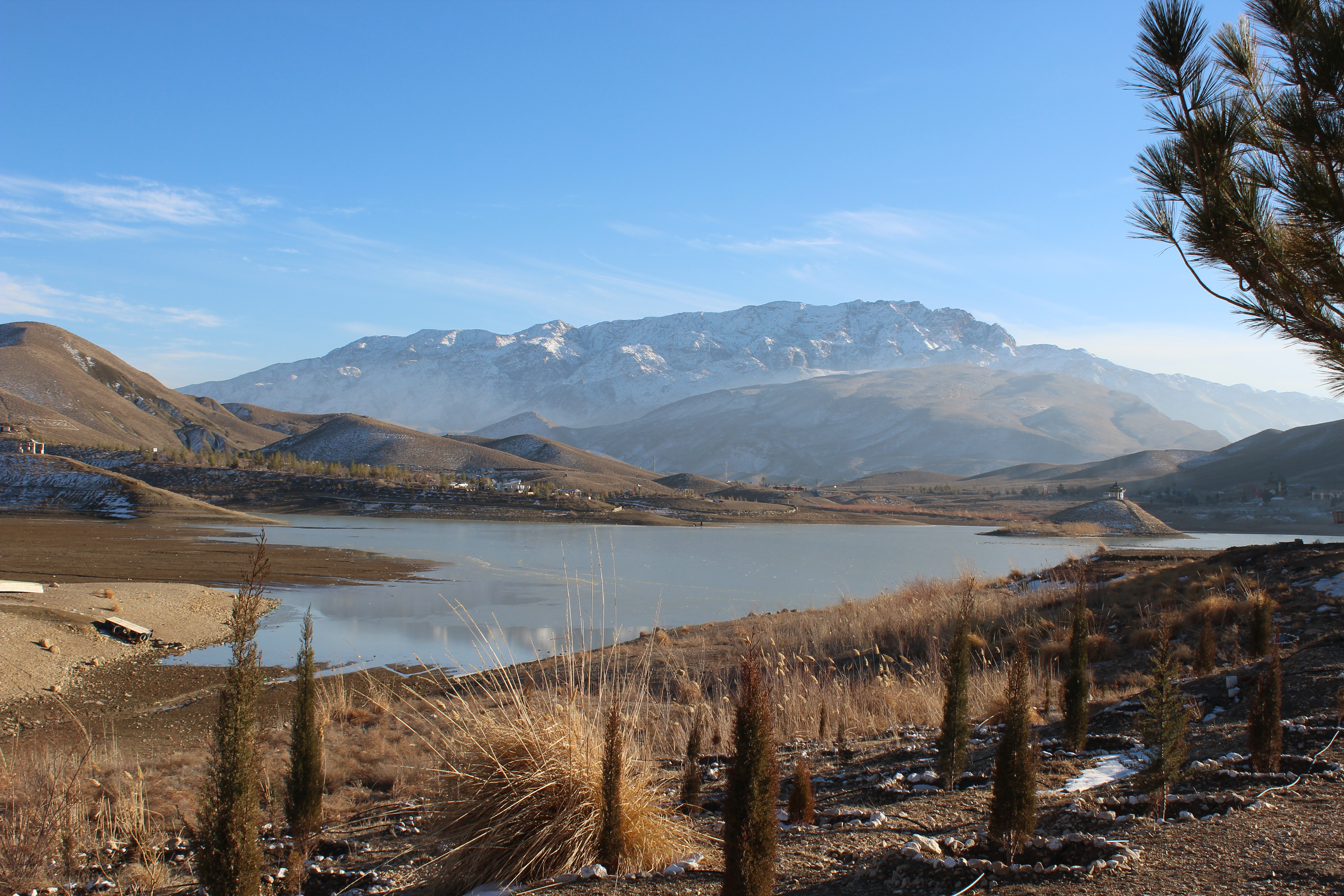

- Location within Balochistan, Pakistan
- Location: Zarghoon Range, Urak Valley Quetta, Pakistan
- Coordinates: 30°15′N 67°06′E
- Type: Reservoir
- Basin countries: Pakistan
- Surface area: 0.11 km^{2} (0.042 sq mi)
- Average depth: 15 m (49 ft)
- Settlements: Quetta

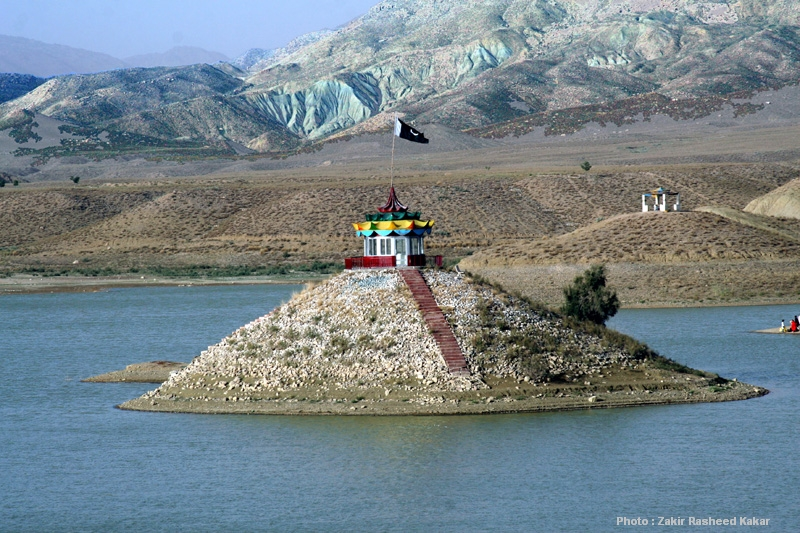
Pakistan Flag in Hanna Lake.

Hanna Lake (Note: Urdu: ہنہ جھیل; Balochi: ہنا جھیل; Pashto: د هانا جهیل; Dari: جهیل هانا) is a lake in Urak Valley near Quetta, in Balochistan Province, in southwestern Pakistan. It is surrounded by mountains.

== Geography ==
Hanna Lake is in the hills close to where the Urak Valley begins, 17 kilometres (11 mi) east from Quetta city. The reservoir was constructed in 1894 during the British Colonial era on the land of local Durrani tribesmen, and is one of the main attractions in the city. It forms a great historical bridge wall between two mountains, the depths like battlements of a fort, for the storing of water.

== Features ==
Hanna Lake is one of the most visited and accessible lakes in Balochistan. There is a lakeside restaurant with picnic tables shaded by pine trees at the end of the river, where families can enjoy the food and weather. On the eastern side of the lake stands the Hayat Durrani Water Sports Academy (HDWSA), the first and only rowing, canoeing, kayaking and sailing training and championships organising centre in Balochistan Province, with provision of rough swimming facility.

== History ==
In 1894, the small action dam Surrpull (Red Bridge) was constructed on the main Urak road to control flooding, and divert water, coming catastrophically from snow melt and rain down the Zarghoon Ghar and Murddar Mountains Koh-i-Murdaar streams, into Hanna Lake through its main canal.

Over a century old in 1894, this lake was spread over an area of 331 hectares with a holding capacity of over 832,790 m³ of water and a depth of 15 metres (49 ft).In 1973 a heavy flood destroyed the Murdar Mountains recharge linked canal on the way to Surrpull, near Spin Kaarrez road, which has not been (Restored) reconstructed till date.

Presently, in May 2016 a heavy flood filled this small action dam Surrpull with mud and stones. Accordingly, all the streams and flood waters are going waste and there is no chance to regulate water conservancy to Hanna Lake without the restoration, desilting of surrpull and both main canals. On the other hand, the water level in Hanna Lake is falling critically low, hence endangering the natural ecosystem, the local wild life, the environment of the surroundings, and native peoples, along with hundreds of migrated birds and thousands of fish. The future of athletic activities such as rowing and canoeing is also in danger. It is possible that the Hanna Lake might be fully dried, like in 1999 to January 2005, and in 2010.

The environmental scientists, Speleologists and the Conservationists are looking at the future of the lake in its most dangerous condition. The current harmful environmental situation will badly affect the natural eco system, environment, and underground water level of the surroundings. However, the small action dam surpull was locally restored / desilted in February 2019, with the assistance of Hashim Khan Ghalzai, secretary P&D, and Hayatullah Khan Durrani C.E, HDWSA. Since then the flood rain from the Zarghoon mountains has been continuously coming to Hanna Lake, and the water level has risen by up to 50%.

== Establishment of (HDWSA) ==
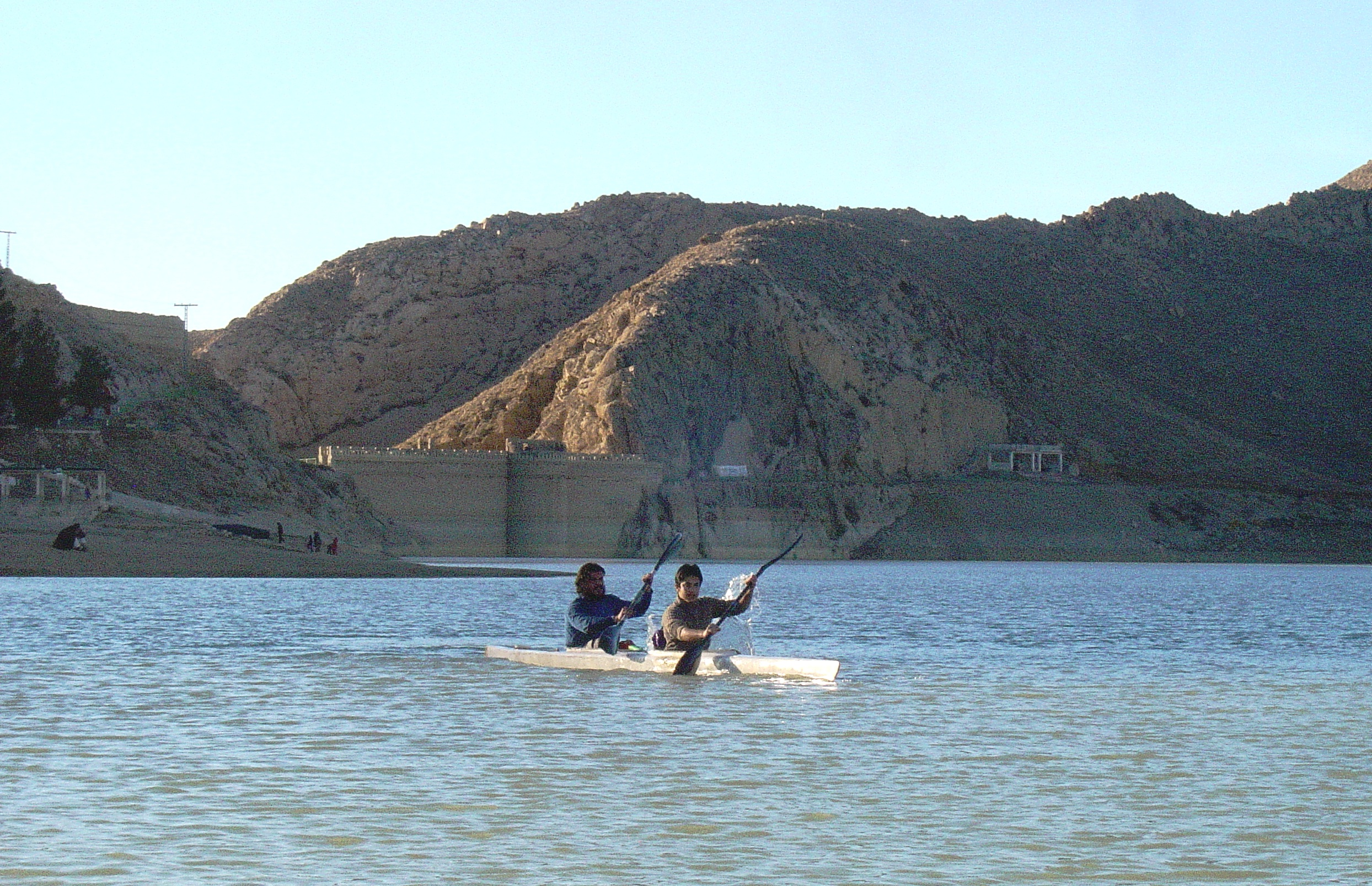
Ali Khilji and Abubakar Durrani Kayaking in front of Hanna Lake Bridge Wall constructed by Great Britain in 1894

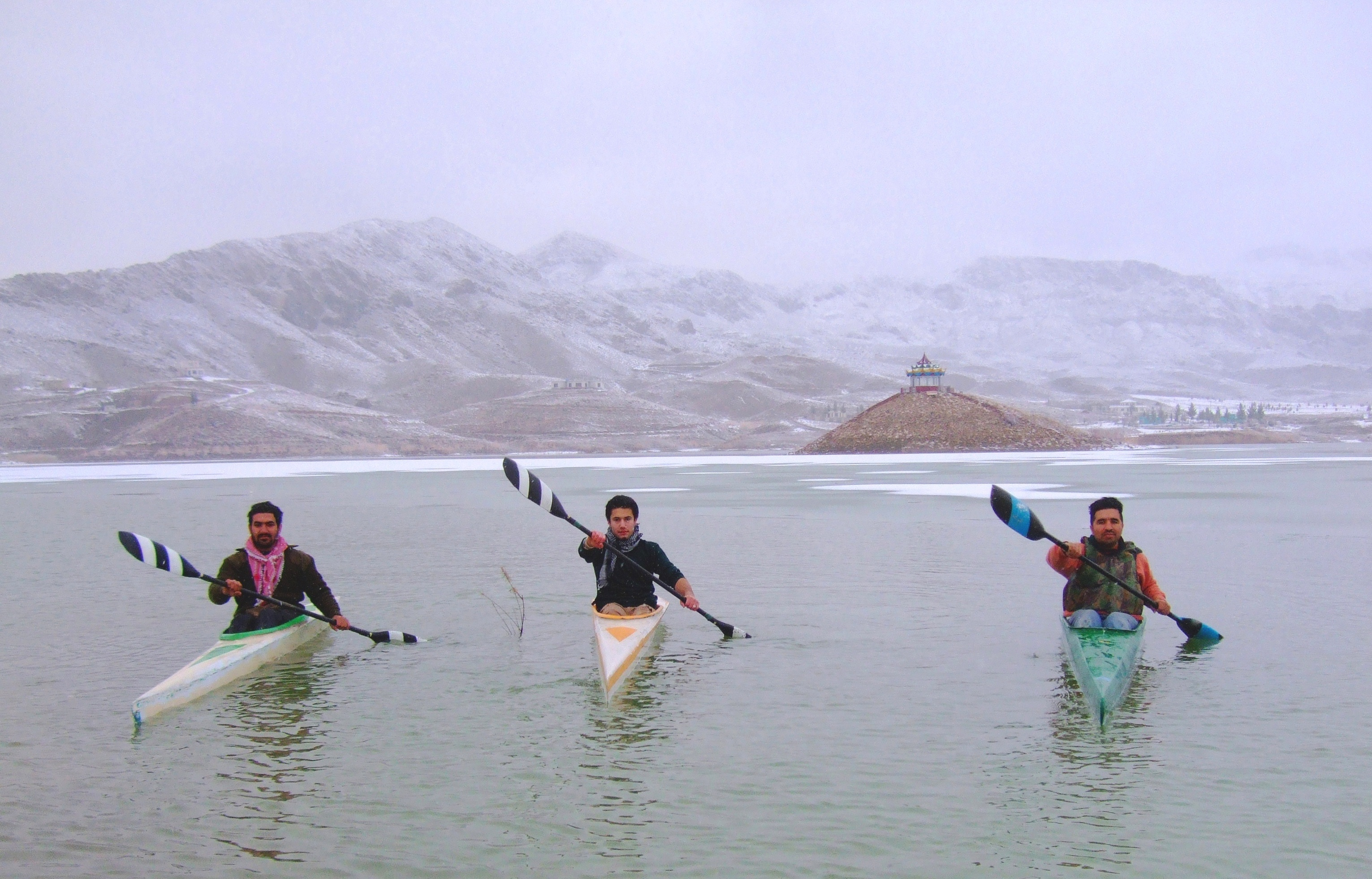
Pakistan National K1 Champion Mohammad Abubakar Durrani with Kayak paddlers heroes of Pakistan in snow kayak training 2012 (Hanna Lake)

In 1986, Hayatullah Khan Durrani a prominent figure in caving and mountaineering adventure sports in Pakistan, independently established the Hayat Durrani Water Sports Academy (HDWSA) International (Pvt, Ltd) on his sprawling ranch near the northwestern edge of Hanna Lake, Quetta. Officially inaugurated on 14 August 1986, coinciding with Pakistan’s Independence Day, HDWSA became Balochistan’s first and only academy dedicated to rowing, canoeing, kayaking, sailing, rough swimming, and boating. The academy offers comprehensive facilities for training, events, and equipment in these sports disciplines, provided voluntarily and free of cost to youth members at Hanna Lake. Hayatullah Khan Durrani also established a Tree Plantation and Environmental Defenders Project within the premises of the (HDWSA). This initiative, specially designated in honor of the International Olympic Committee (IOC), symbolizes the enduring bond of friendship between Pakistan Canoe Kayak athletes and the international sports community. It showcases the vital role that athletes play in actively contributing to a more peaceful, healthier, and sustainable environment.

== 1990 Hanna Lake boat disaster ==
On 6 July 1990, 40 people were killed and 8 injured when an overcrowded local tourists boat capsized in Hanna Lake. Most of the victims were on holiday. Another boat was used to rescue the victims.

== Present day ==
The réservoir needs repairs. Since August 2016, Hanna Lake is fully dry, killing thousands of fish, along with negatively affecting the level of the National and International Canoe, Kayak, and Rowing Teams as they can no longer practice here. There is also a water channel which was constructed at the same time by the British to convert the snow and rain water near Spin Kaarez, coming from Murdar Mount, as surplus for filling the reservoir. This channel was destroyed by a heavy flood in 1976 and has still not been reconstructed. This loss of snowmelt and rain water caused Hanna Lake to fully dry up between 1999 and January 2005. The government of Balochistan did nothing for the restoration of water level at Hanna Lake. The HDWSA and Hanna Lake Development Authority (HLDA) - the custodians of Hanna Lake - restored water flow through the surplus canal to maintain Hanna Lake.

=== Dry lake ===
During years 2000–2010 Hanna Lake dried up and the natives along with hundreds of migrated birds were in trouble.

=== Full lake ===
However, in 2011 the lake re-filled and once again gave rise to flora and fauna in its environment. The turquoise waters of the lake provide a rich contrast to the sandy brown of the hills in the background. One can promenade on the terraces or hire a boat and paddle on the lake and round the island in the middle.

== See also ==
- Hanna-Urak Waterfall
- Quetta
- Urak Valley
