= Chhajjian =

Valley in Khyber Pakhtunkhwa, Pakistan

Chhajjian (Urdu - Hindko چھجیاں) is a valley in Haripur District in Khyber Pakhtunkhwa province of Pakistan. It is located South East of the District Haripur at 33.88522°N 73.038054°E). It is surrounded by pine-covered mountains which are rich in wildlife.

The Chajian Waterfall is on the outskirts of Chhajjian.
