= Moola Chotok =

Ravine in Balochistan, Pakistan

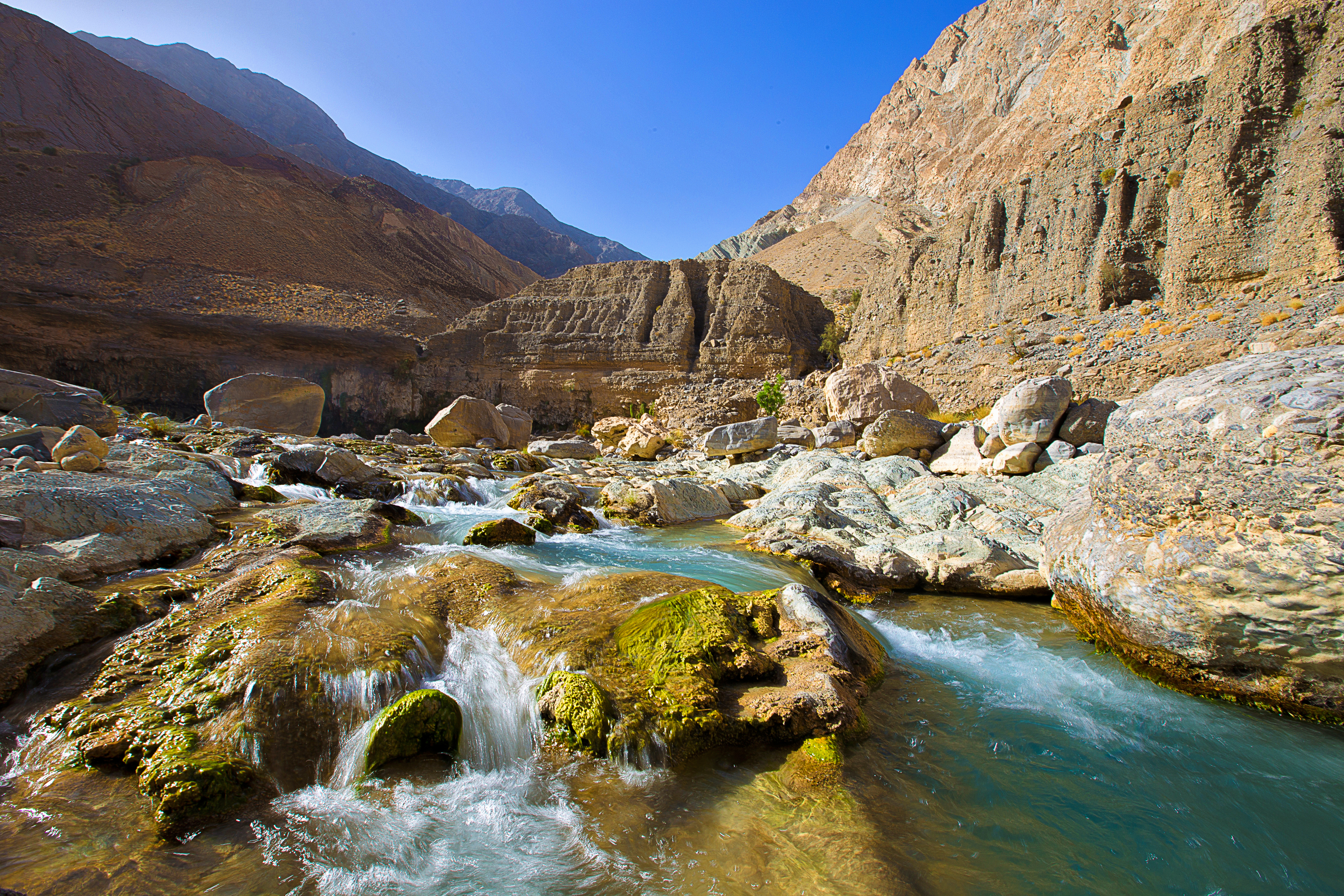
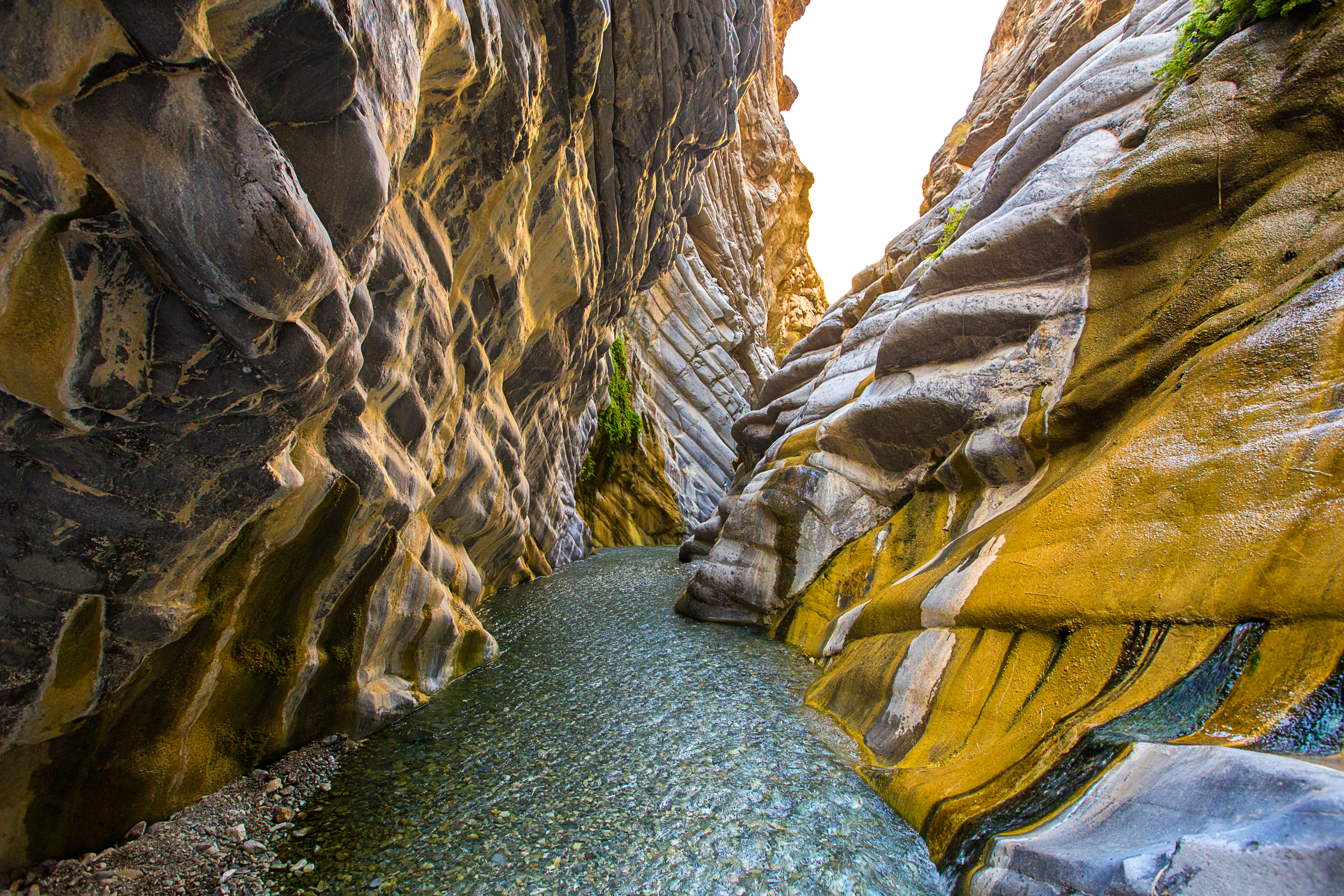
- Inside a ravine in Moola Chotok, Khuzdar district, Balochistan
- Floor elevation: 1,237 m (4,058 ft)

Geography
- Location: Khuzdar District, Balochistan, Pakistan
- Coordinates: 28°08′46″N 67°07′54″E
- Rivers: Moola River
- Interactive map of Moola Chotok

Moola Chotok (Urdu: مُولہ چٹوک) is a hidden ravine located in the middle of the Khuzdar District in the southern province of Balochistan, Pakistan. It is situated approximately 105 kilometres (65 mi) north-east of Khuzdar at an elevation of 1,237 metres (4,058 ft). Surrounded by tall cliffs, the cascading waterfall, known as Chotok, is one of the biggest waterfalls of Moola Tehsil.

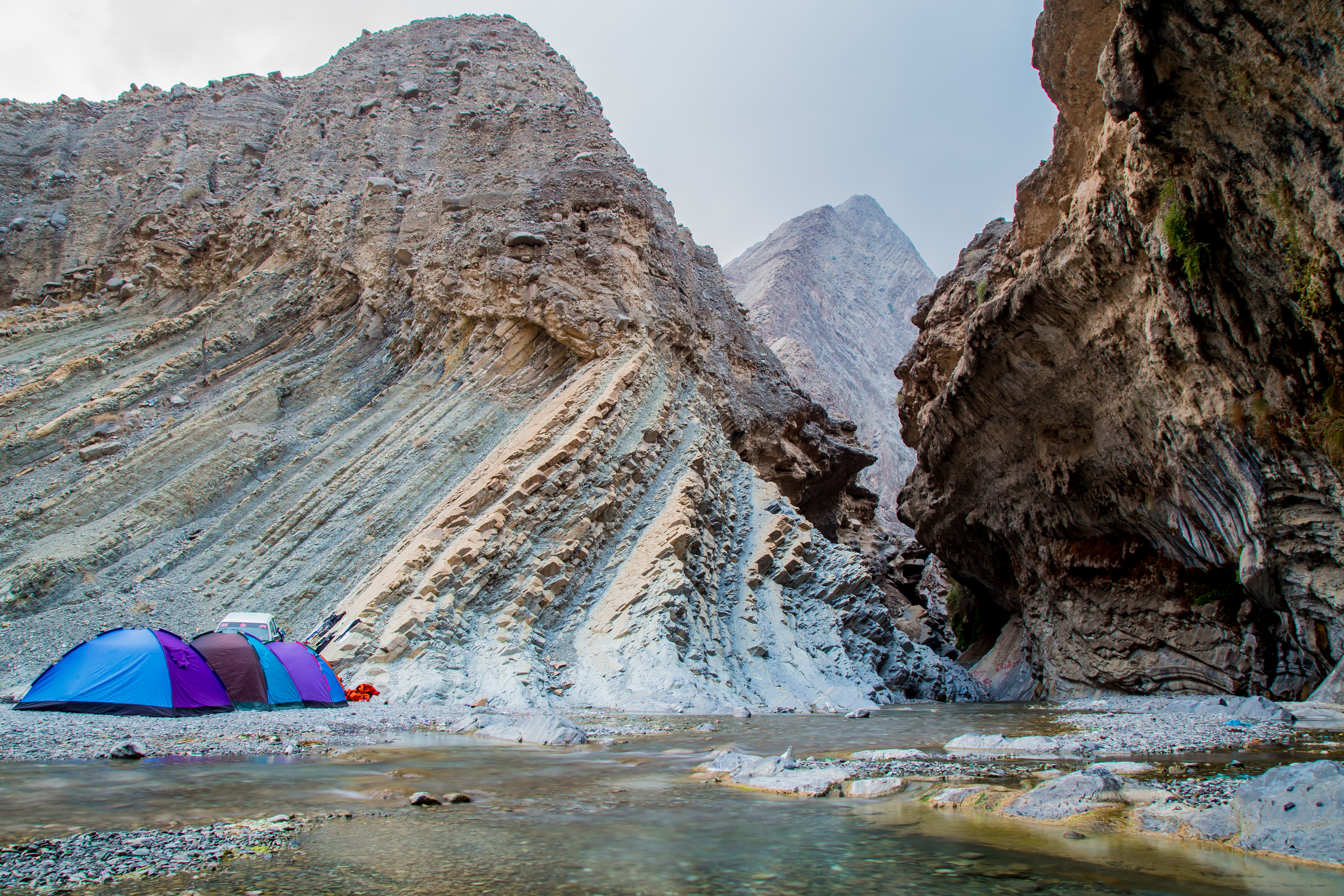
Camps at Moola Chotok

== History ==
Moola Chotok is located in the Moola valley of Khuzdar District. While Kalat was historically the capital of the Brahui kingdom, Khuzdar grew over the decades to become a big commercial hub and the third-largest urban center in Balochistan province today.

Ruins of Thore kheer, Hitachi, Harav, Kial Being and Pasta Khan reveal the belonging of Moola to the 2,000-year-old civilisation. Moola River, located in the mountains of Dist Khuzdar, is the largest river of the Khuzdar region that flows throughout the year. Moola Valley is a 1237 metre long bow-shaped region, 80 kilometres (50 mi) away from Khuzdar District. It is named after the Moola Village and River, which flows through the length of the valley. The valley is home to several mountain ranges, salt mines, lakes and waterfalls.

== Demography ==
Jahan is one of the most beautiful villages of Sub Tehsil Moola. The population is estimated to be over 20,000. The main local language of Moola Chotok is Brahui.

== Weather ==
In summer, it is one of the hottest places in the country like Sibi and Dhadar. Temperatures vary wildly throughout the year, with summer highs commonly exceeding 120 °F (48.9 °C) and winter minimum temperatures sometimes falling below freezing point. Weather conditions can greatly affect hiking and valley exploration, and visitors should obtain accurate forecasts because of hazards posed by exposure to extreme temperatures and late summer monsoons.

== See also ==
- Chotok Waterfalls
- List of districts of Balochistan
