= Mouri Syedan =

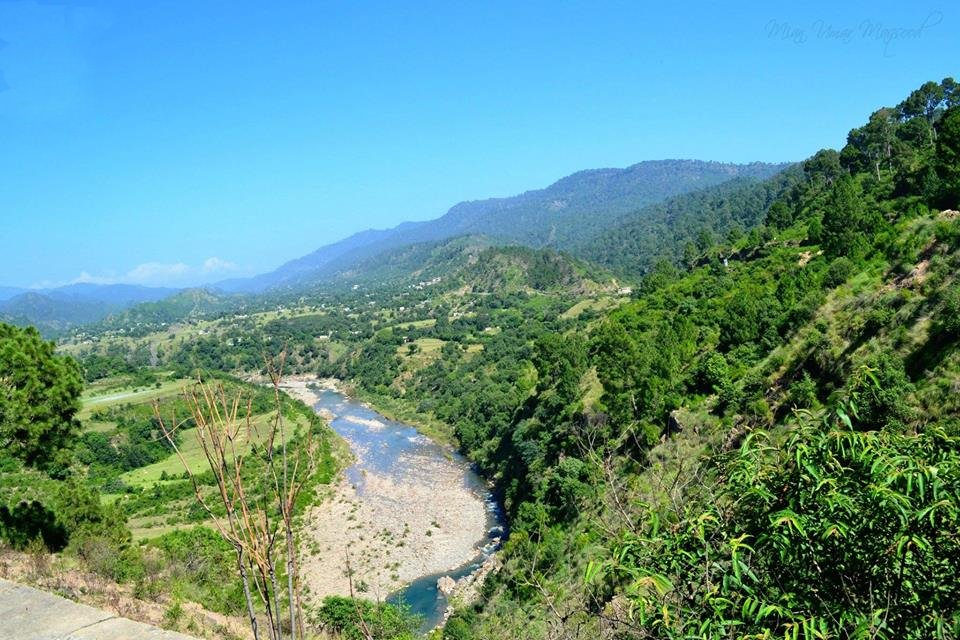

- Location within Punjab, Pakistan Location within Pakistan
- Coordinates: 33.661425°N 73.363547°E
- Country: Pakistan
- Province: Punjab
- District: Rawalpindi
- Time zone: UTC+5 (PST)

Mouri Syedan is located on Lehtrar Road in Rawalpindi District of Punjab, Pakistan. It is situated at an elevation of 2,297 feet (700 m). Mouri Syedan is famous for its turns, forests and streams. It is about 45 kilometres (28 mi) away from Islamabad.

The main language spoken is Pahari-Pothwari.

== See also ==
- Neela Sandh Waterfall
