= Urak Valley =

Urak Valley وادیِ اورک یوراک وادی د اورک دره دره اورک
- Valley
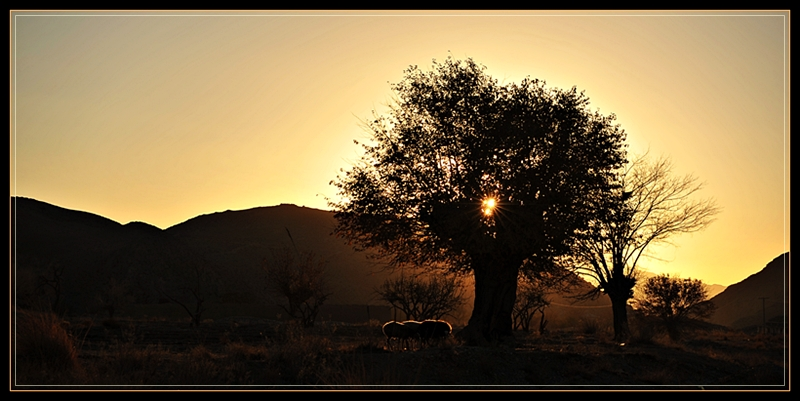
- Urak Valley in Quetta

- Location within Pakistan
- Coordinates: 30.275400°N 67.192168°E
- Country: Pakistan
- Province: Balochistan
- District: Quetta District

Population
  - Total: 24,000
- Time zone: UTC+5 (PST)

Urak Valley, also known as the Hanna Urak Valley, is a valley surrounded by mountains in the Quetta District of Balochistan Province, in western Pakistan. It is located in Zarghoon Range near Hana Lake, and 28 kilometres (17 mi) from Quetta city. A small waterfall at its end marks entrance to the adjacent Wali Tangi Dam.

Urak Valley has a population of 24000, and is the ancestral home of the Kakar tribe of Pashtuns. Agriculture in the valley includes growing apple trees of good quality and a few other fruits.

== Tourism ==
The valley is the most visited tourist destination in Balochistan; and also the only spot in the province to have received average daily visits of 15,000 and 20,000 tourists from all over Pakistan.

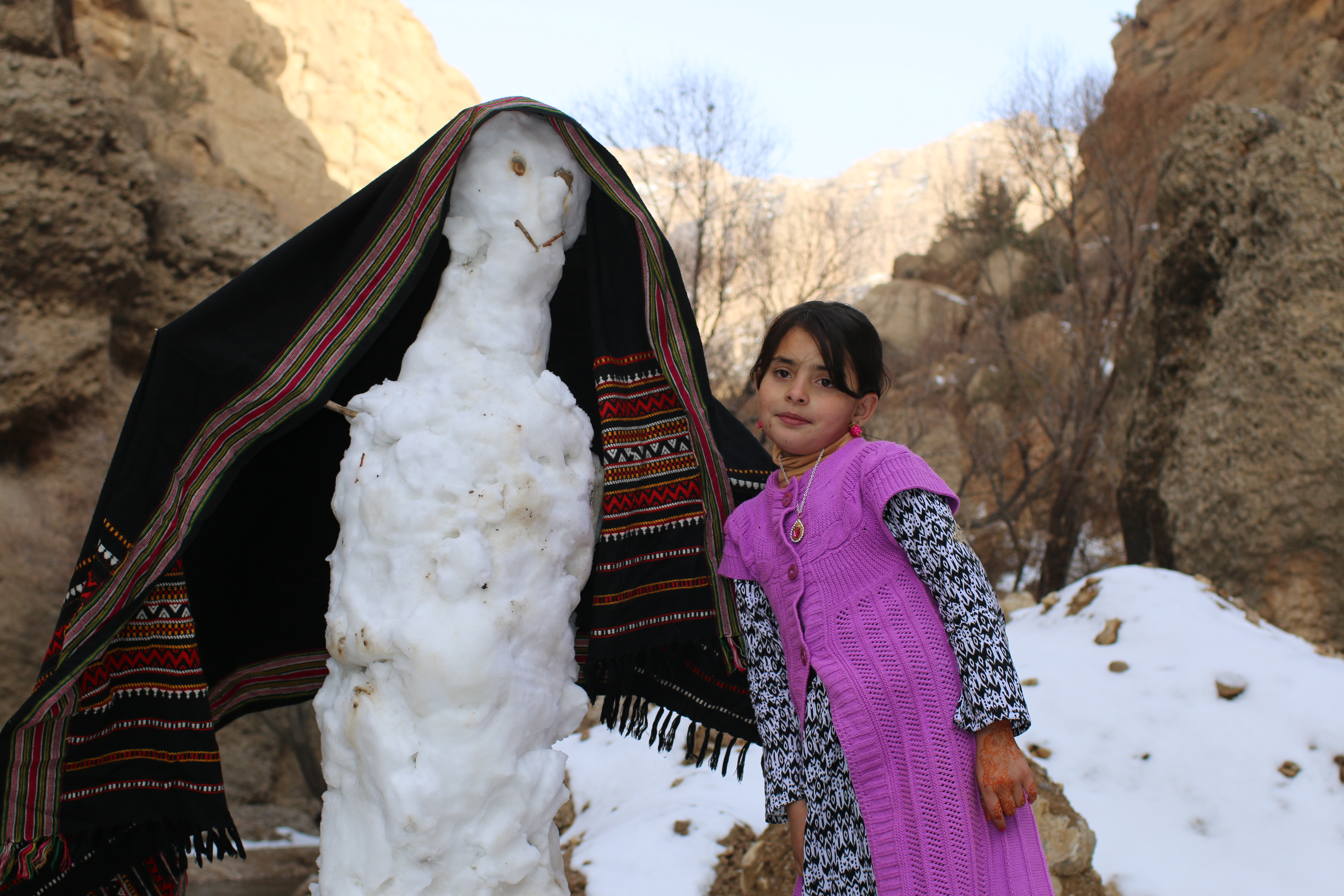
Young girl playing with a snowman in Urak Valley

== Gallery ==
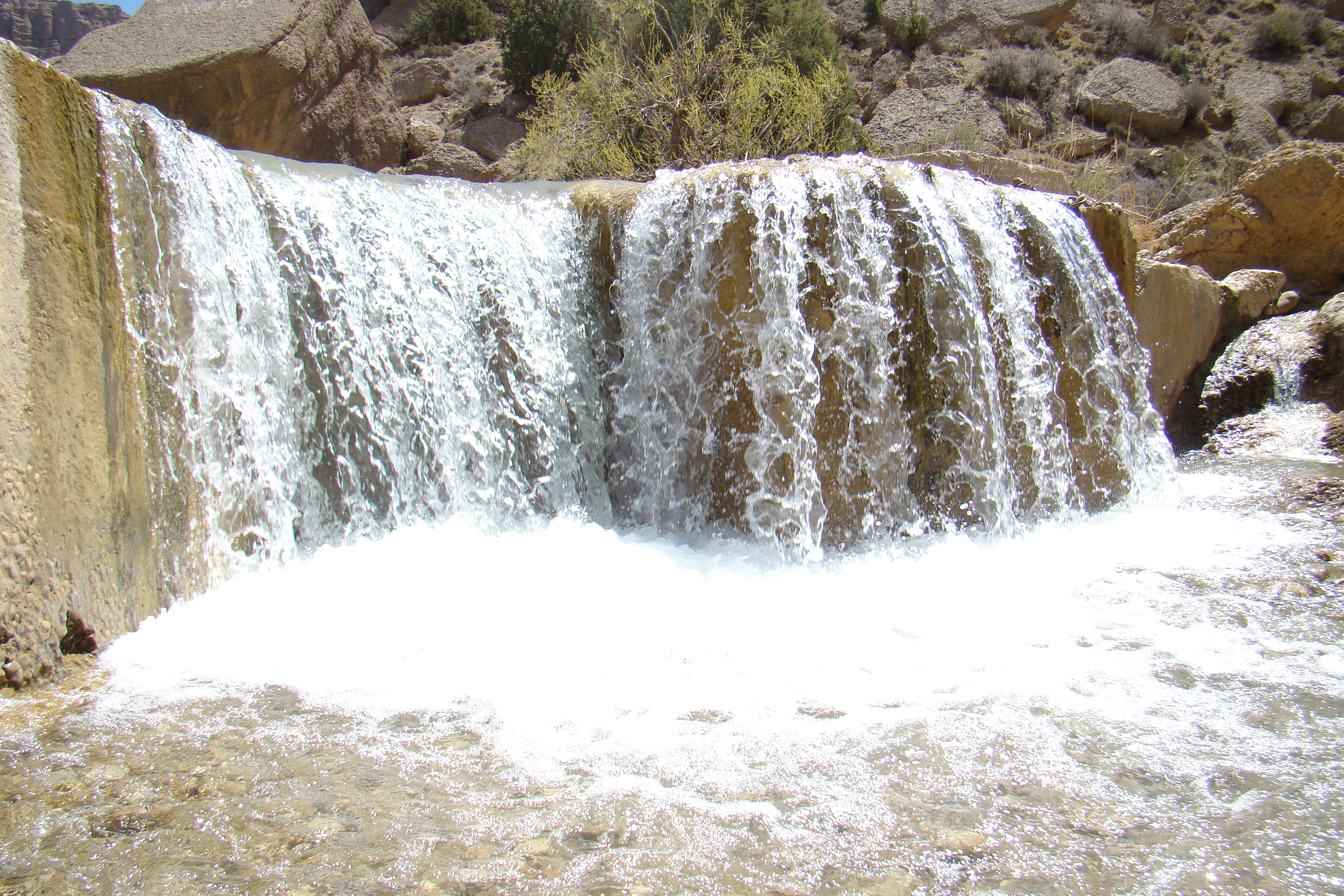
Hanna-Urak Waterfall

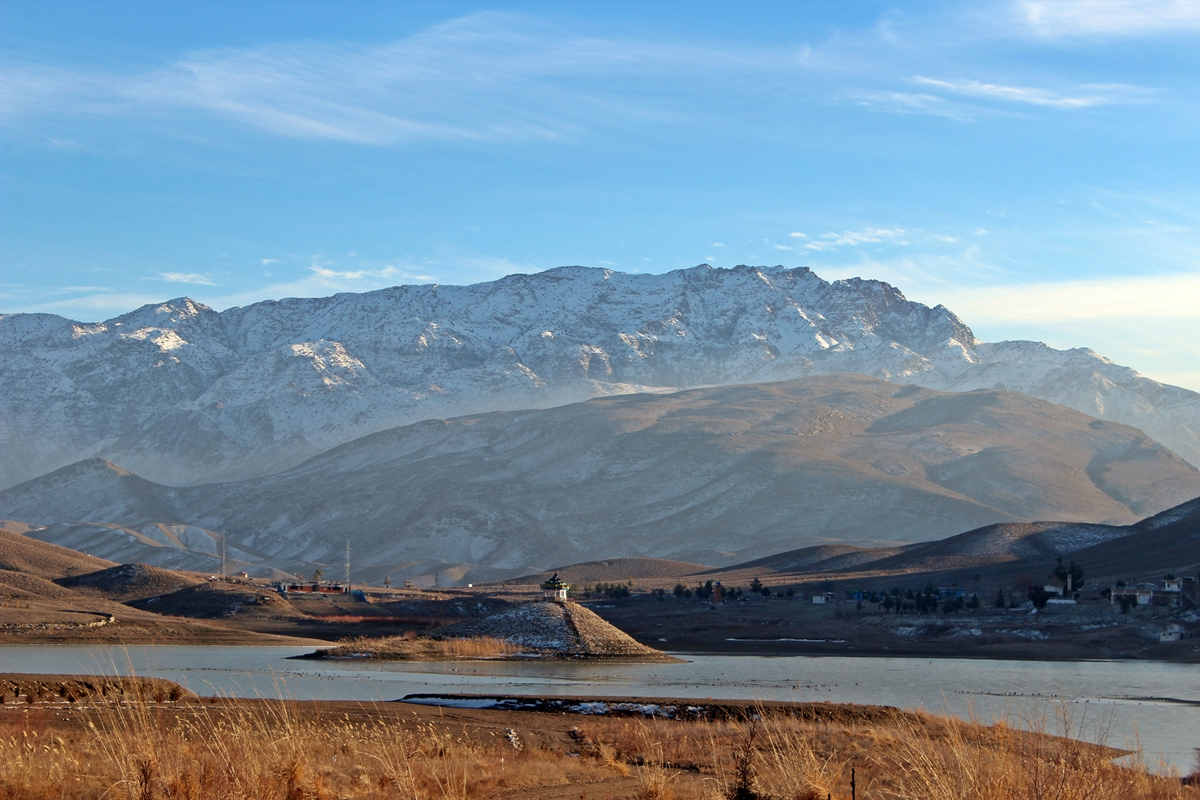
Hana Lake

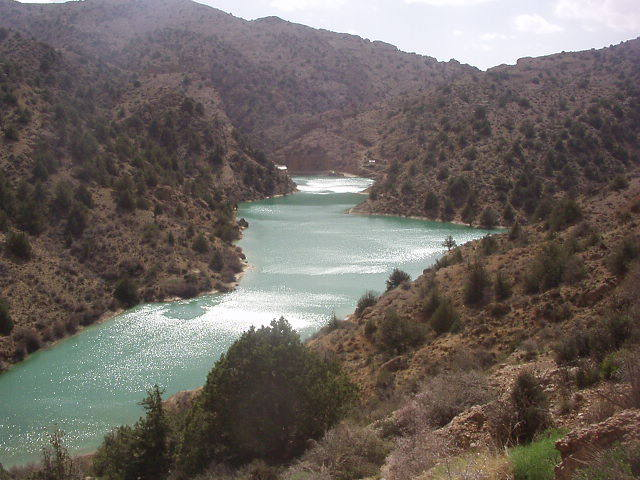
Wali Tangi Dam

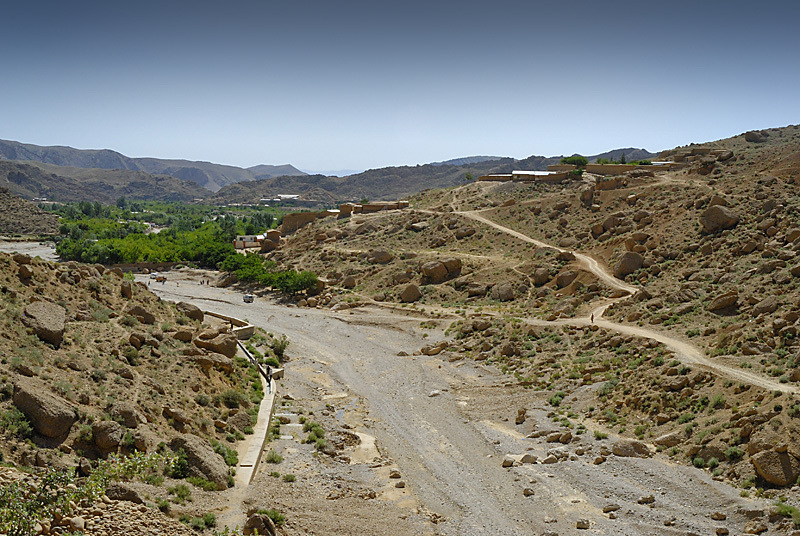
End of Urak Valley

== See also ==
- Hana Lake
- Hanna-Urak Waterfall
- Wali Tangi Dam
- Quetta
