= Koh-i-Zarghun =

Mountain in Baluchistan, Pakistan

Mount Zarghun

Highest point
- Elevation: 3,550 m (11,650 ft)
- Prominence: 1,593 m (5,226 ft)
- Coordinates: 30°16′00″N 67°18′00″E

Geography
- Location: Northeast of Quetta, Pakistan
- Parent range: Sulaiman Mountains

Koh-i-Zarghūn (Note: Urdu: کوه زرغون; Balochi: کوہ ءِ زرغون; Pashto: زرغون غر; Dari: کوه زرغون) is a mountain of the Suliman Range located northeast of Quetta in the province of Balochistan, Pakistan. The highest peak of Zarghun is Loe Nikan, which is 3,550 meters high. It is the highest peak of the Central Brahui Range as well as the province.

== See also ==
- List of ultras of the Karakoram and Hindu Kush
