= Karachi Freight Corridor =

Overview
- Status: Active
- Locale: Karachi, Pakistan
- Termini: Karachi Port Trust; Marshalling Yard Pipri

Service
- Type: Freight
- System: Pakistan Railways

Technical
- Line length: 55 km (34 mi)
- Number of tracks: 2 (double-track corridor)

The Karachi Freight Corridor is a significant infrastructure project in Pakistan aimed at improving the movement of freight from the Karachi port city to various parts of the country. The project involves the construction of a dedicated double-track corridor and other related facilities.

== Background ==
The Karachi Freight Corridor initiative was introduced to establish a connection between Karachi port and other parts of Pakistan, facilitating increased trade. Its objective is to link ports in Karachi with industrial centers across the country. The cargo containers commenced their trip from Hutchison Ports Pakistan (also called the South Asia Pakistan Terminal) following the project's inauguration.

== Project details ==
The expected cost of the project ranges from $8 to $10 billion. The corridor is planned to stretch 55 kilometers, connecting the Karachi Port Trust to the Marshalling Yard Pipri. Anticipated benefits include a significant reduction in traffic congestion within Karachi city. The project will be developed through a Public Private Partnership model, and the respective contributions from both sectors will be finalized in the near future.

As of early 2022, the government planned to construct a specialized double-track corridor connecting Karachi Port to a new rail-to-logistics terminal at Pipri Marshalling Yard. This initiative aims to address the congestion issue at the port, where approximately 10,000 containers were parked, leading to significant congestion. The Ministry of Railways sought backing during a meeting of the Cabinet Committee on Transport and Logistics to proceed with the construction of this double-track corridor.
