= Port Grand =

Recreational area in Karachi, Pakistan

Coordinates: 24.8453°N 66.9920°E

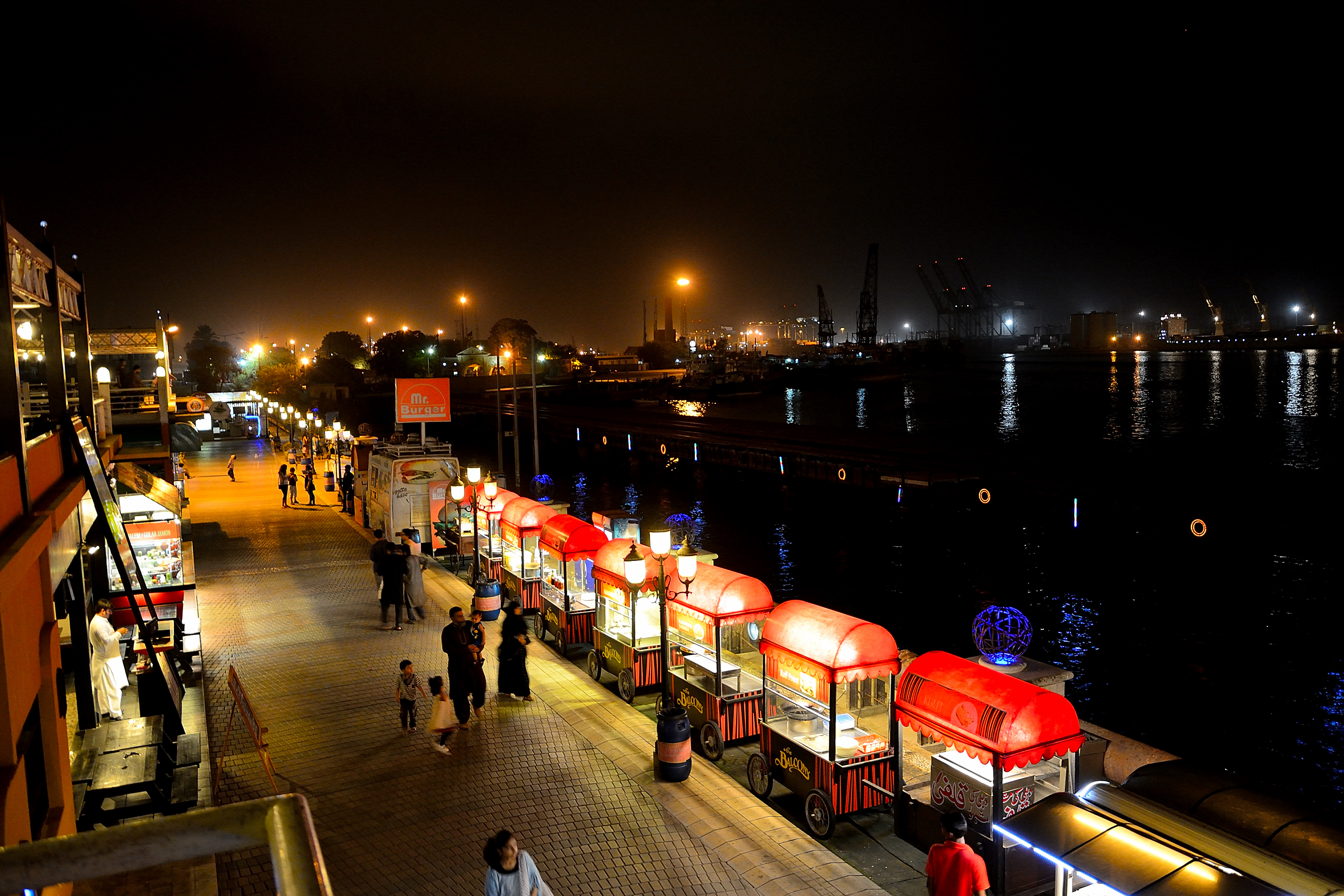
A view of Port Grand, Karachi.

The Port Grand Food and Drink and Entertainment Complex (Urdu: مجتمع غذا و نوشیدنی و تفریحی پورٹ گرینڈ) is a recreational area built in Karachi, Sindh, Pakistan. It is located along the waterfront of the 19th century Native Jetty Bridge that connects the Karachi Port Trust to Keamari and spans the western end of China Creek to the Harbour. The project was a result of joint efforts by the Karachi Port Trust and a private company Grand Leisure Corporation. The complex was inaugurated on 28 May 2011 by then Governor of Sindh, Ishratul Ibad. The complex is a hub of shopping, dining, cultural and coastal recreational activities in the city.

Port Grand is located on Napier Mole Bridge, a site that is very significant to the history of Karachi and has played a crucial role in making it the city it is today. The project stretches along 305 metres (1,000 ft) of Karachi's ancient 19th century Native Jetty Bridge and spreads over an area of 19,000 square metres (200,000 sq ft).

The one-kilometre (0.62 mi) bridge has been transformed into an entertainment and food enclave housing numerous eateries totalling 3,700 square metres (40,000 sq ft) of climate-controlled area and space for kiosks and 11 restaurants of exotic Pakistani and foreign food and a variety of beverages. To attract more people, the management has also started offering speedboat rides that take passengers along China Creek. The riders can also see the mangroves planted there, but do not actually pass through them. The management also hopes that the speedboat rides will help people understand the need to protect mangroves and reduce marine pollution.

== Gallery ==
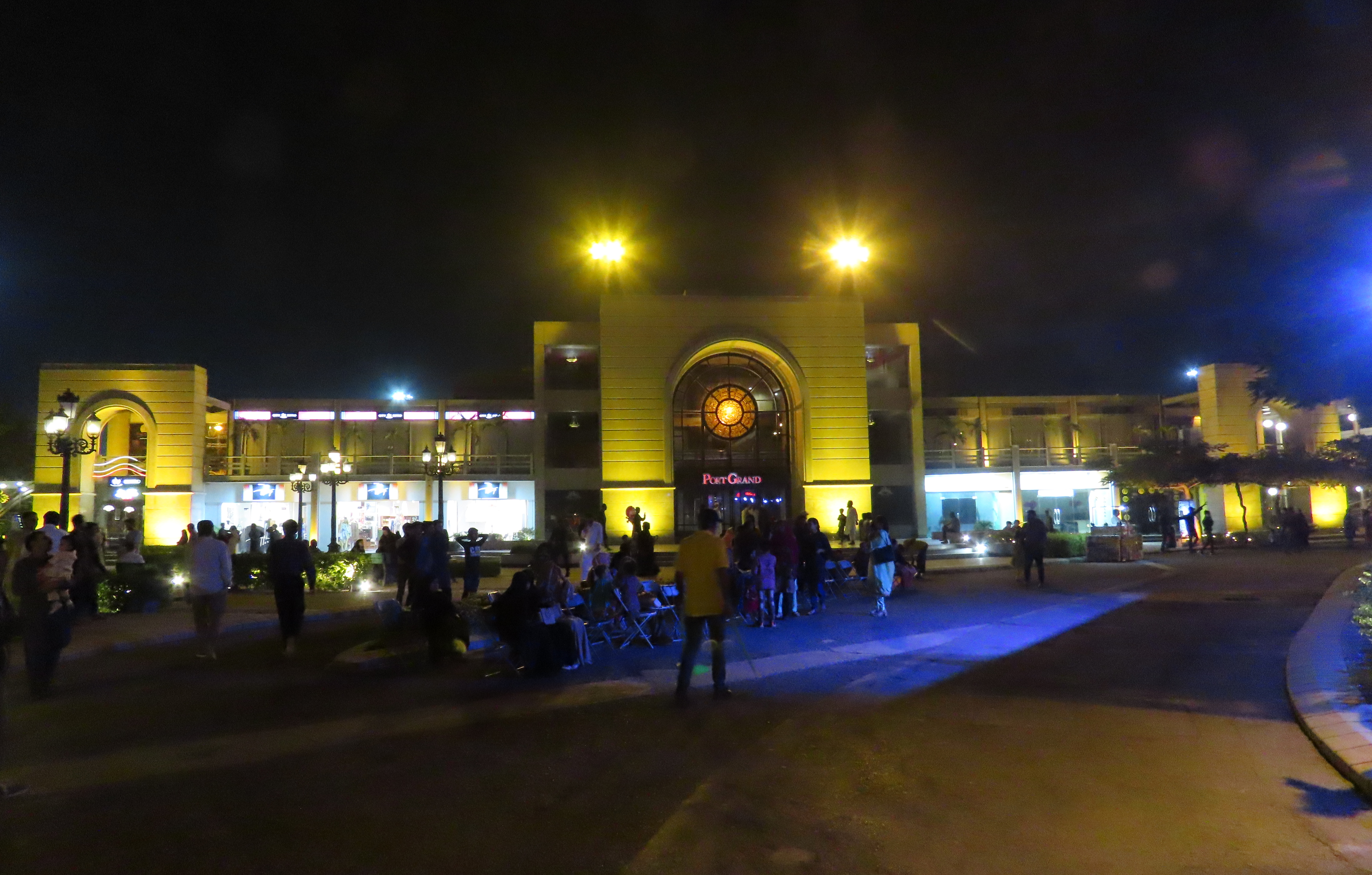

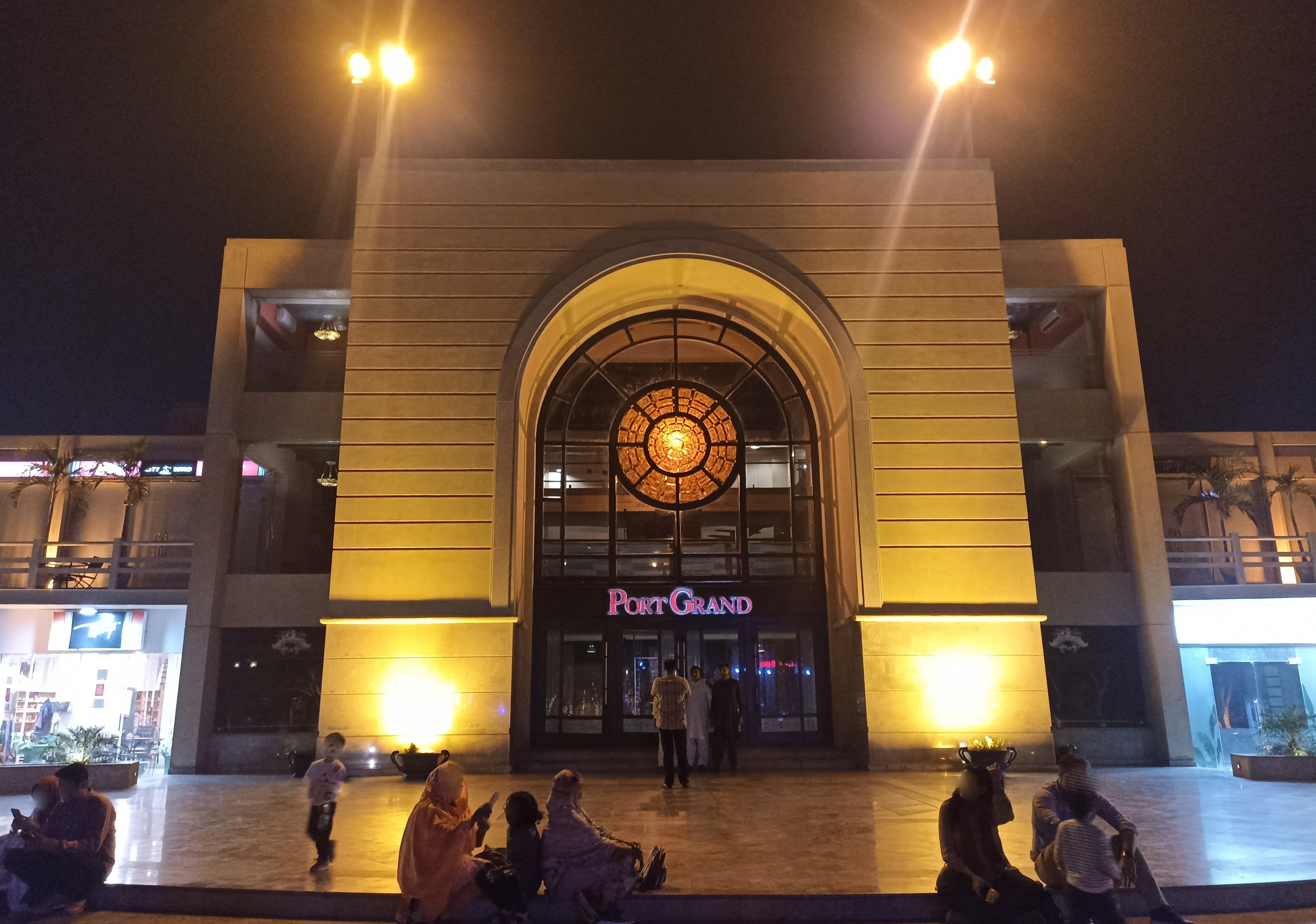

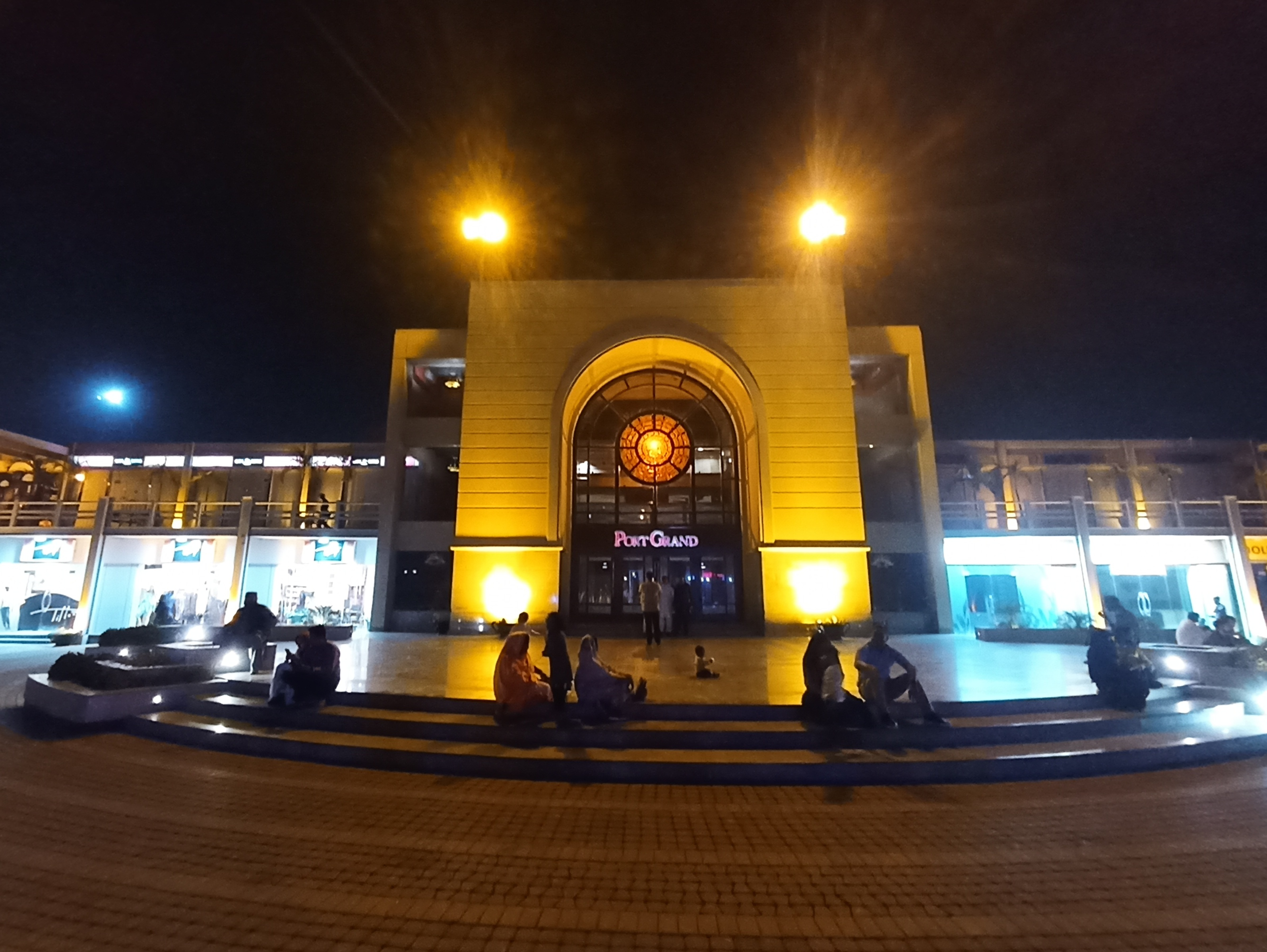

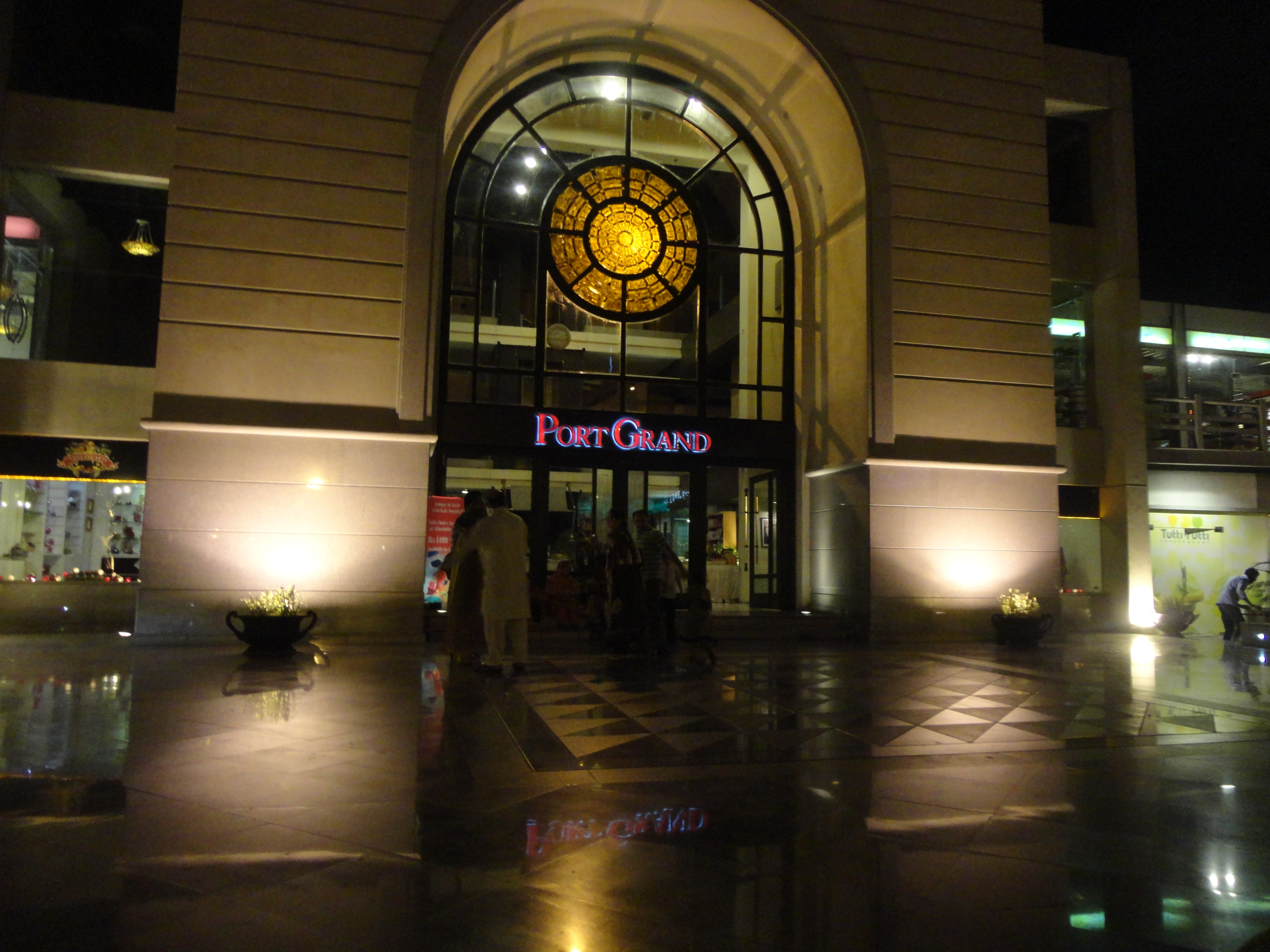

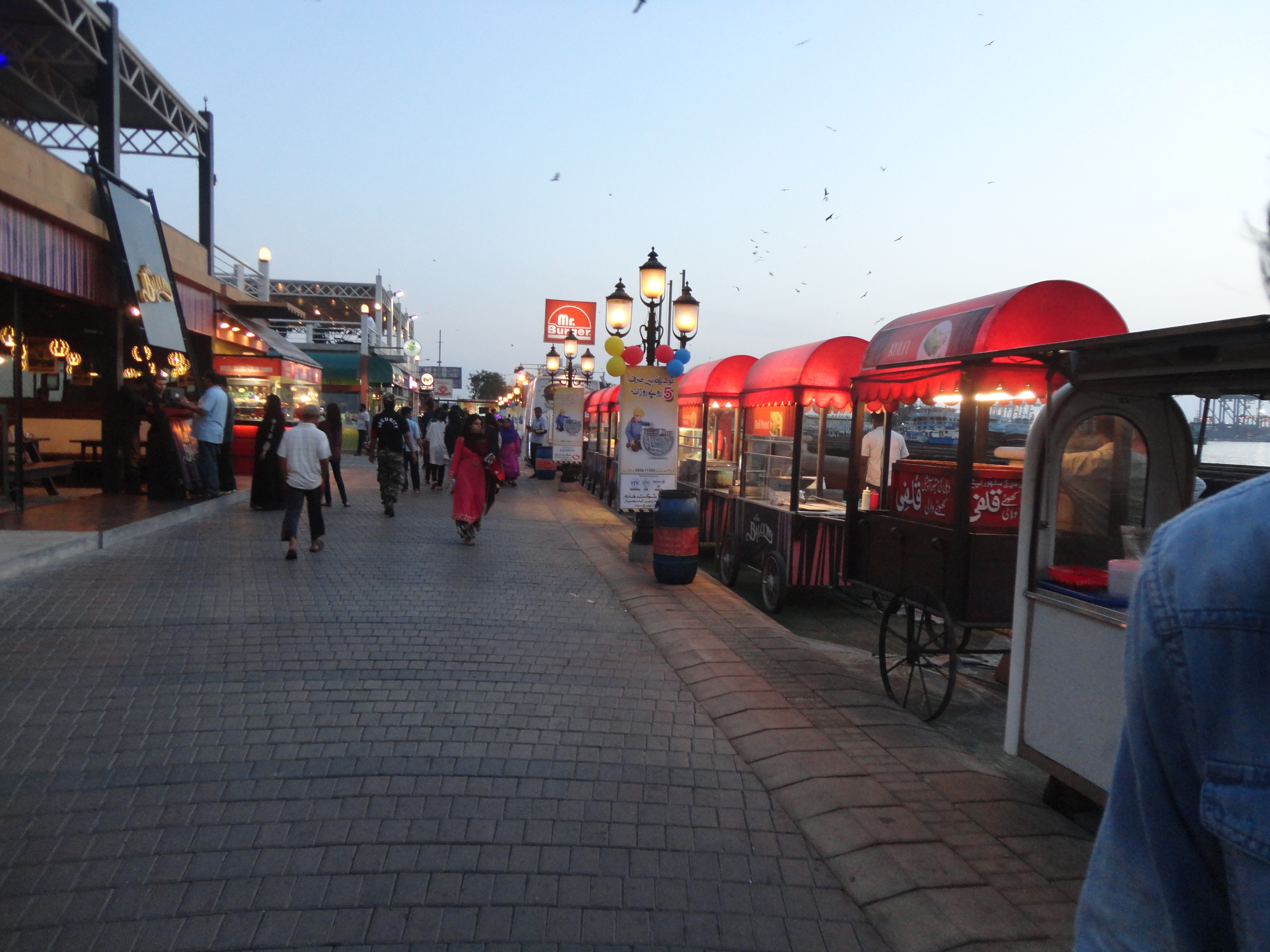

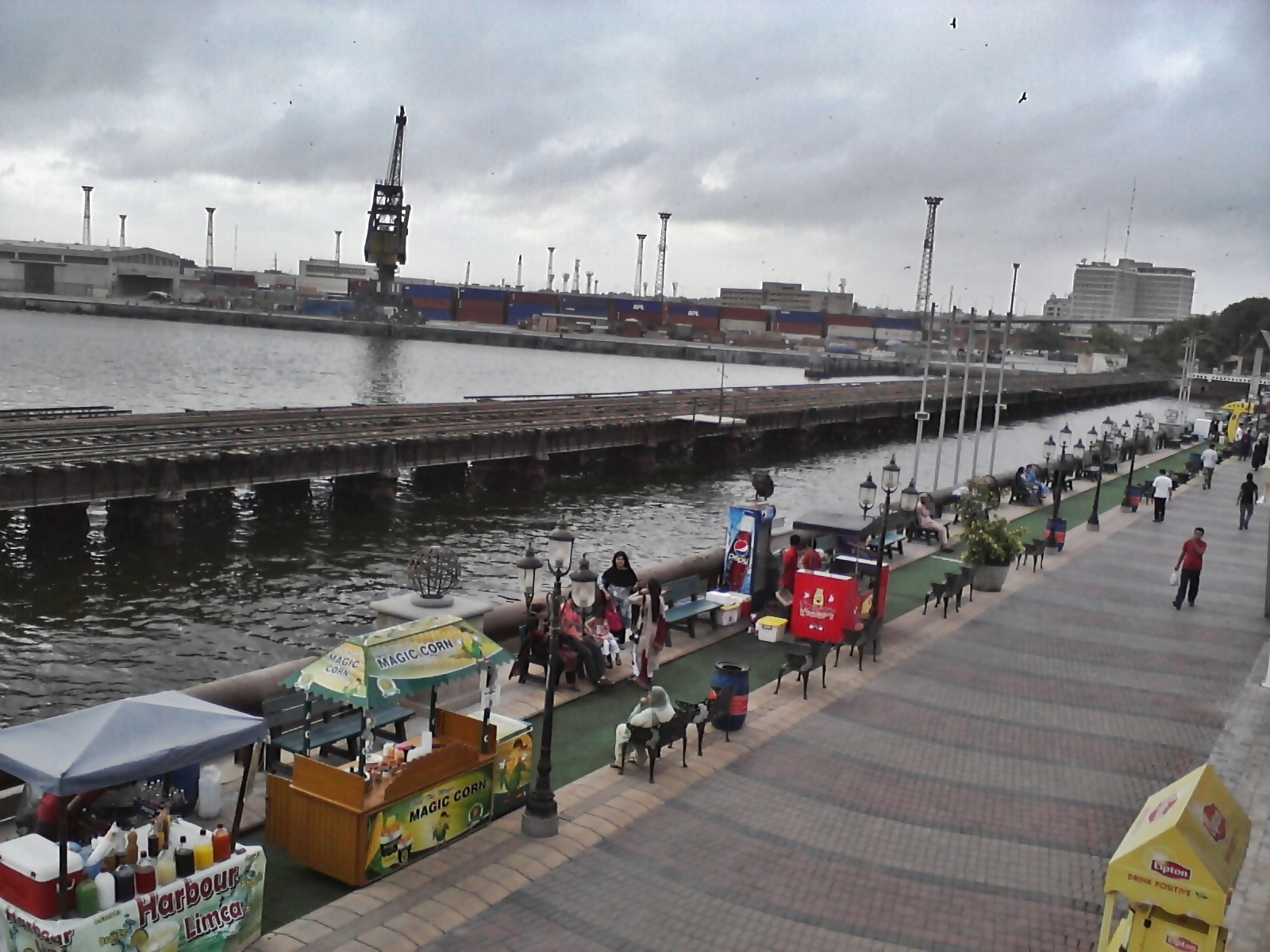

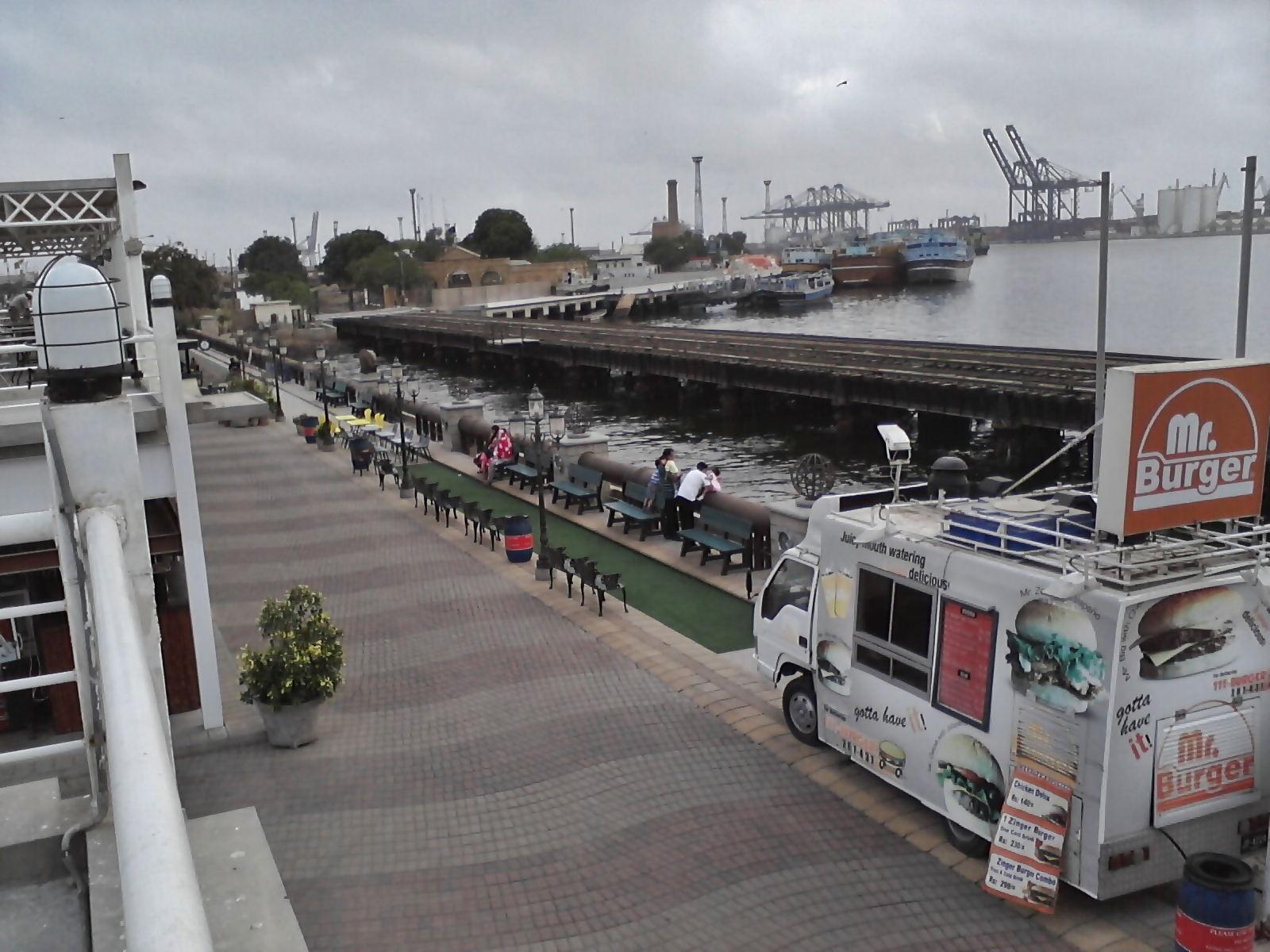

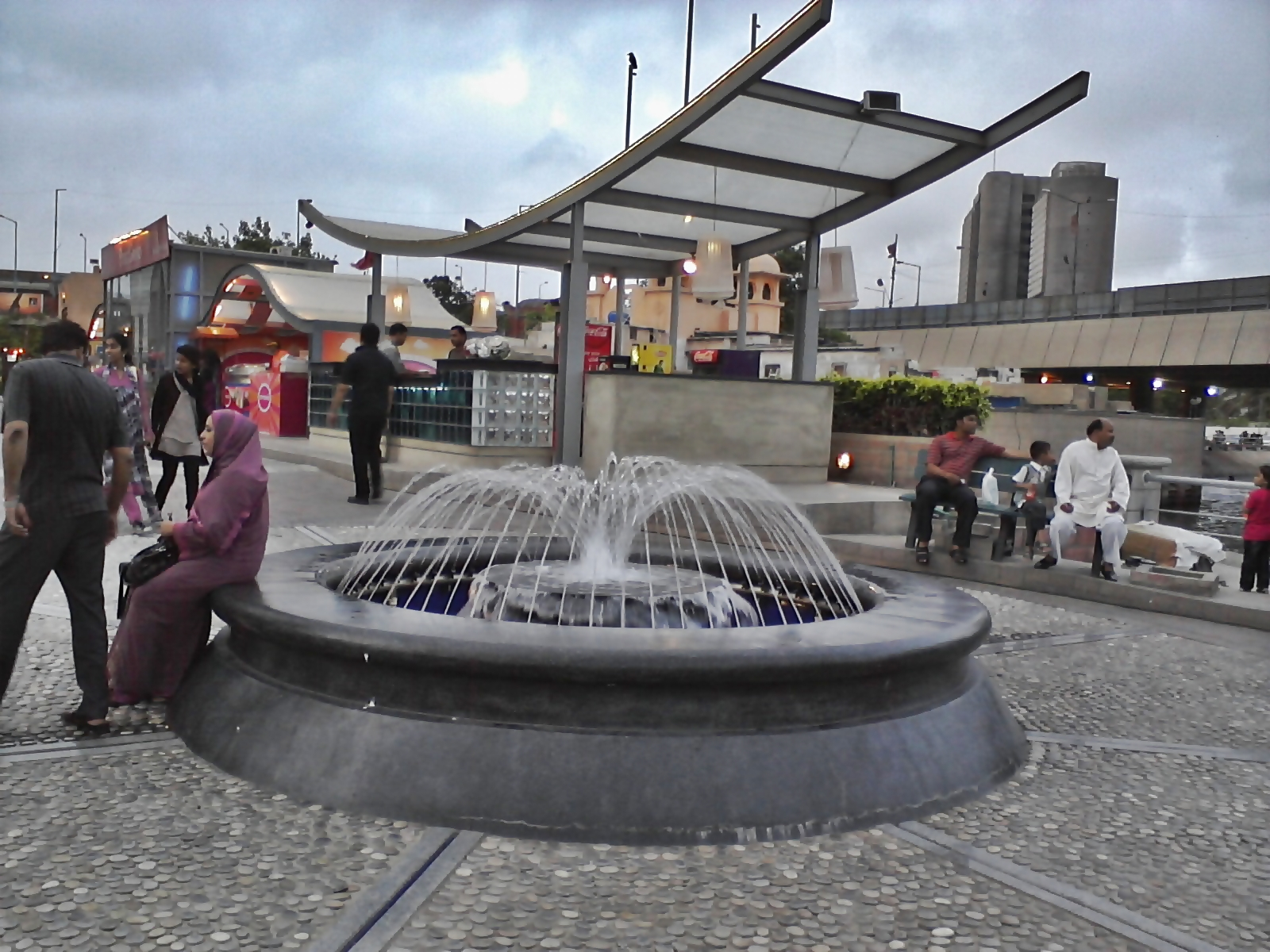

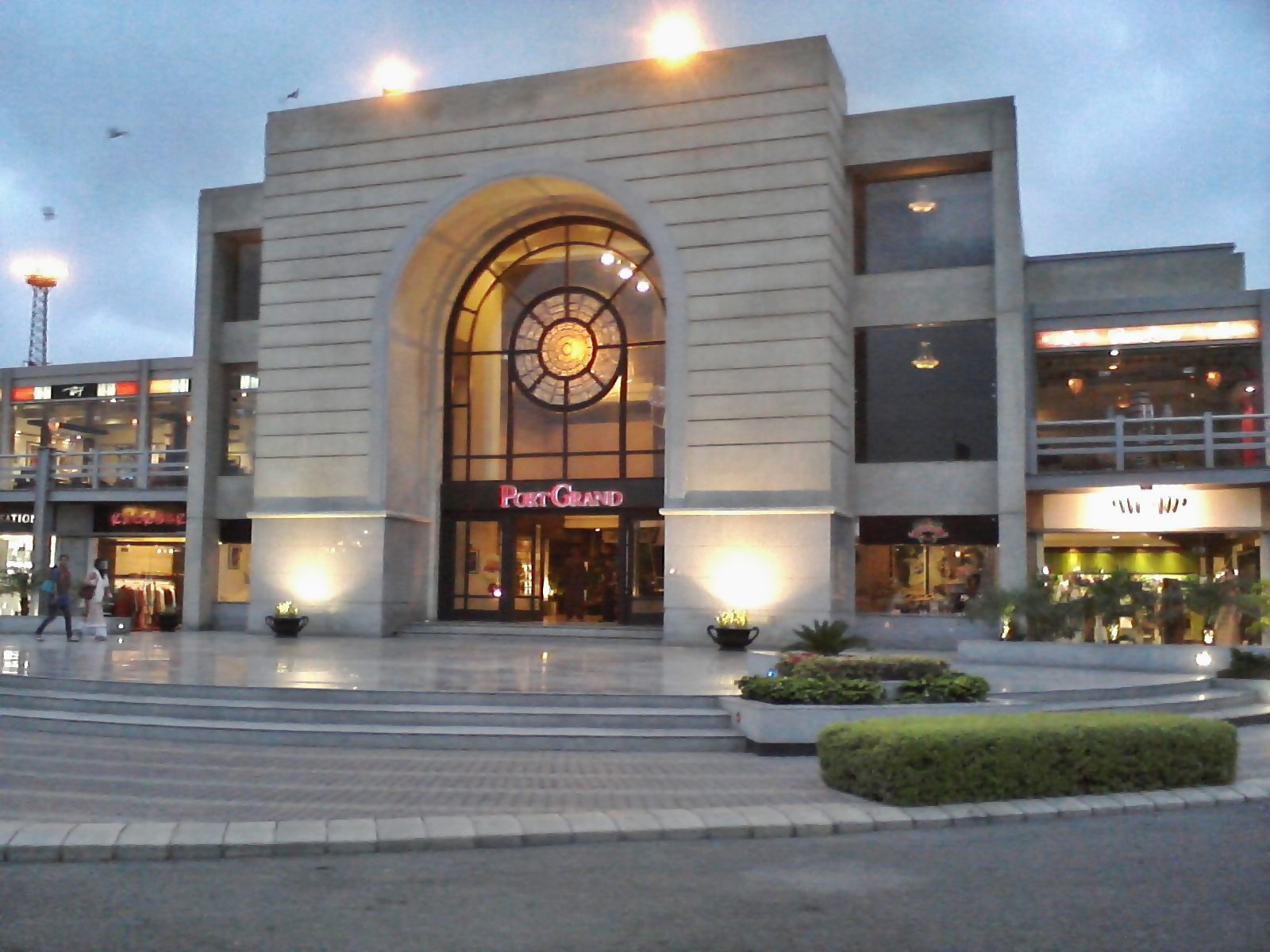

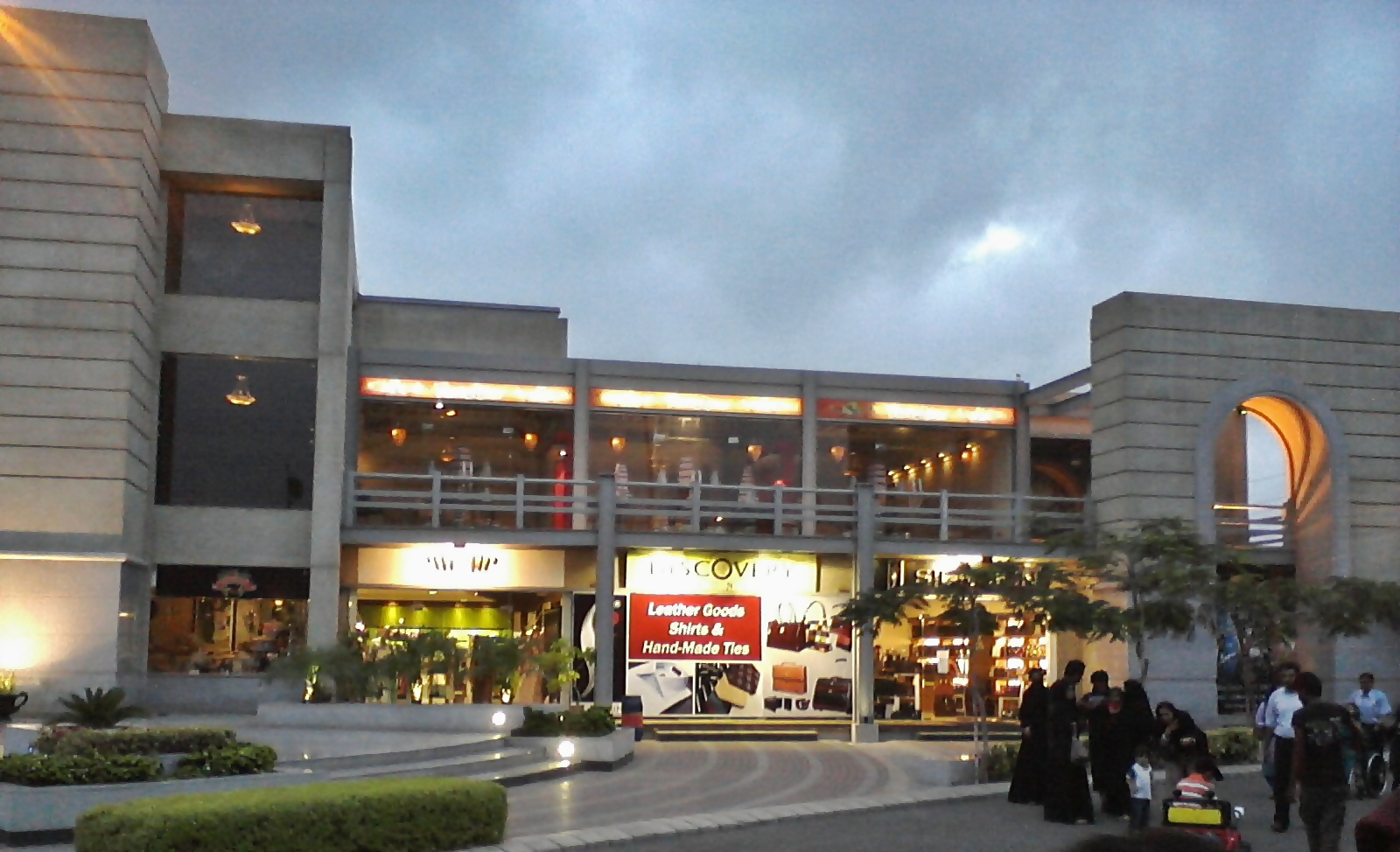
