= The Energy and Resources Institute =

Research institute based in New Delhi

The Energy and Resources Institute - TERI
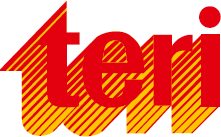

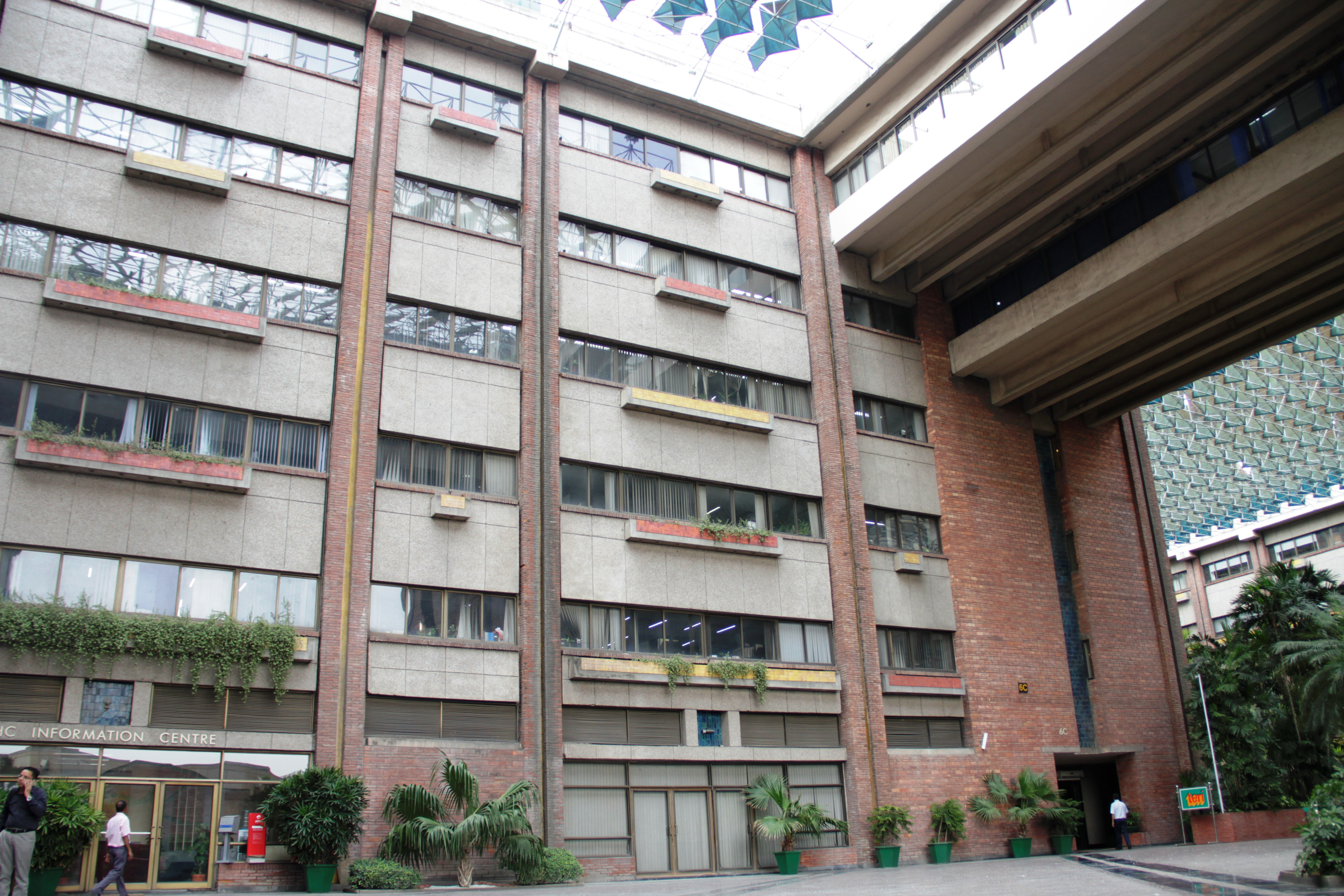
- TERI Headquarters at the India Habitat Centre (IHC), Lodi Road, New Delhi
- Established: 1974; 52 years ago
- Founder: Darbari S Seth
- Type: Non Profit Research Institution
- Location: New Delhi, India
- Director General: Dr. Vibha Dhawan
- Website: www.teriin.org

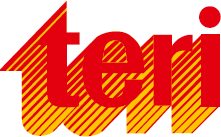
The Energy and Resources Institute logo.png

The Energy and Resources Institute (TERI) is a research institute in New Delhi that specializes in the fields of energy, environment and sustainable development. Established in 1974, it was formerly known as the Tata Energy Research Institute. As the scope of its activities widened, it was renamed The Energy and Resources Institute in 2003.

== History ==
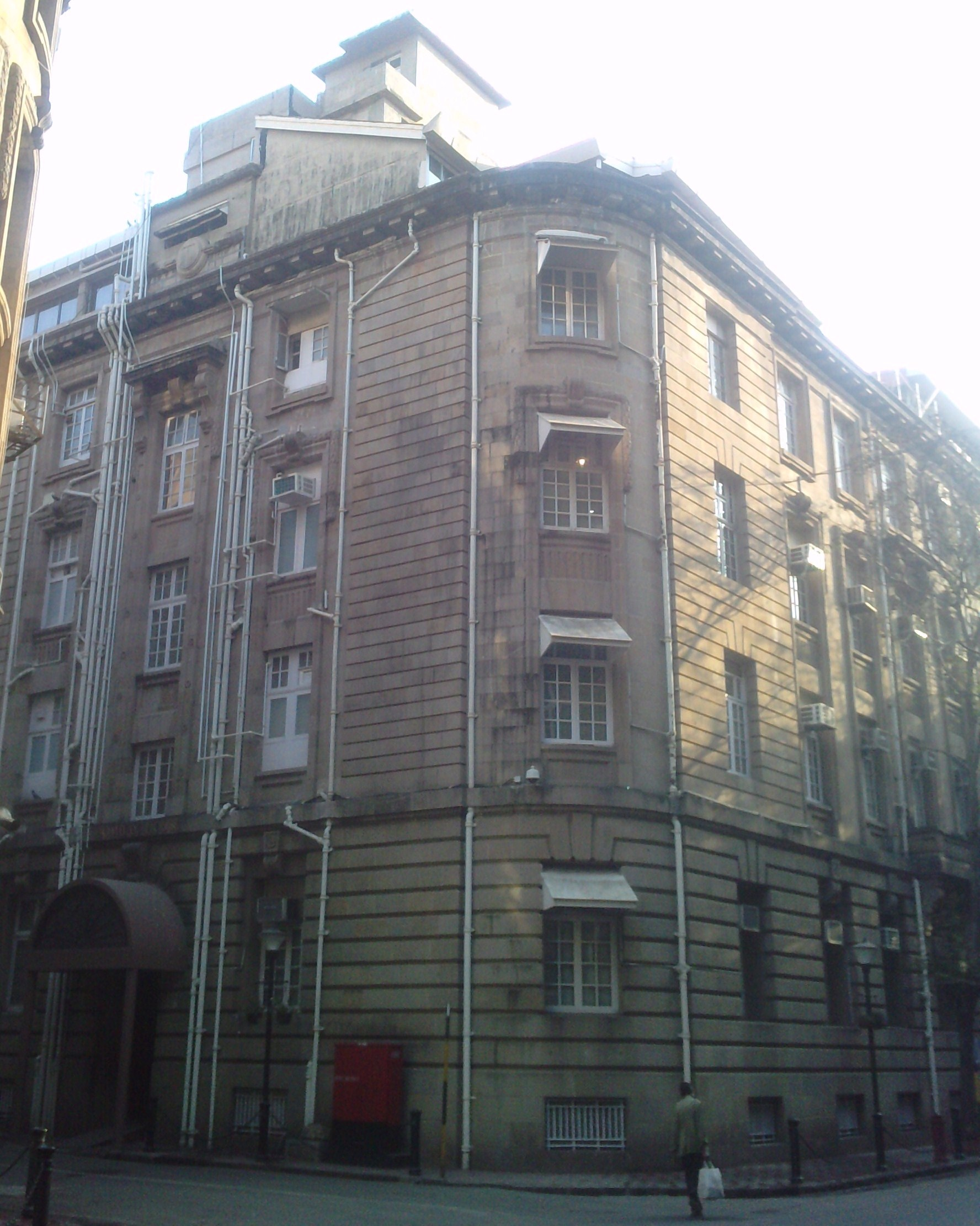
Bombay House the head office of Tata Group from where TERI started operations

The origins of TERI lie in Mithapur, a remote town in Gujarat, where a TATA engineer, Darbari Seth, was concerned about the enormous quantities of energy his factory spent on desalination. He proposed the idea of a research institute to tackle the depletion of natural resources and energy scarcity. J. R. D. Tata, chairman of the TATA Group, liked the idea and accepted the proposal. TERI was set up with a modest corpus of 35 million rupees. On the invitation of the then Prime Minister Indira Gandhi, TERI was registered in Delhi in 1974 as the Tata Energy Research Institute.

== Locations ==
TERI initially began its operations in the Bombay House, Mumbai, headquarters of Tata. In 1984, it moved to Delhi where it continued to operate out on the rented premises (which included the India International Centre) for almost a decade. In 1993, the organization set up its permanent base in Darbari Seth Block, named after its founder, in the India Habitat Centre complex located at Lodi Road, New Delhi. Today TERI has a global presence with many centres in India and abroad.

- Headquarters at the India Habitat Center, New Delhi.
- Southern Regional Centre, Bengaluru
- Western Regional Centre, Goa
- North - Eastern Regional Centre, Guwahati
- Himalayan Centre, Mukteshwar
- TERI Mumbai, Navi Mumbai
- TERI Japan, Tokyo
- TERI North America, Washington, D.C.
- TERI Europe, London
- TERI South East Asia, Kuala Lumpur

In October 2011, Princess Máxima of the Netherlands opened the European headquarters of TERI in Utrecht.

TERI established a research base in Africa to provide technical assistance as well as to facilitate exchange of knowledge amongst the communities in various African states.

In 2016–17, TERI set up the world's biggest facility for Mycorrhiza production in Gual Pahari, Gurugram, Haryana.

== Staff ==
TERI has over 1250 employees, with research professionals from disciplines pertaining to issues of environment and energy. The institute's present director general is Dr Vibha Dhawan.

== Activities ==
The scope of the organisation's activities includes climate change, energy efficiency, renewable energy, biotechnology, and social transformation.

- World Sustainable Development Summit (WSDS) – An annual summit which facilitates the exchange of knowledge on diverse aspects of global sustainable development.
- Green Olympiad – Conducted in association with MoEF, it is an international environment examination that is annually organized for middle and high-school students.

== Publications ==
TERI Press, TERI's publishing arm releases publications out of which some vaguely noteworthy publications are :

- TERI Energy Data Directory and Yearbook (TEDDY) : Launched in 1986, it is a compilation of energy and environment data. It is a reference document and a source of information on energy supply sectors (coal and lignite, oil and gas, power, and renewable energy sources) as well as energy-consuming sectors (agriculture, industry, transport, residential, and commercial sectors).

== GRIHA ==
Green Rating for Integrated Habitat Assessment (GRIHA) was conceived by TERI and developed with Ministry of New and Renewable Energy, is a national rating system for green buildings in India.

== TERI School of Advanced Studies ==
TERI School of Advanced Studies was established on 19 August 1998, and was recognised by the University Grants Commission (UGC) as a deemed-to-be University in 1999. Set-up as the TERI School of Advanced Studies in 1998, the institution was subsequently renamed TERI University.

== TERI Prakriti School ==
Established in January 2015 to provide sustainability education and help create environmental awareness among children at an early age. Inaugurated by Union Minister for Environment and Forests Prakash Javadekar, the K–12 school is affiliated to CBSE.

== See also ==
- Rajendra K. Pachauri
- World Sustainable Development Summit
- TERI University
- TERI-Deakin Nanobiotechnology Centre
