= George Wittet =

Scottish architect (1878–1926) working in India

- Born: 1878
- Died: 1926 (aged 47–48)
- Occupation: Architect
- Buildings: Chhatrapati Shivaji Maharaj Vastu Sangrahalaya; Gateway of India; King Edward Memorial Hospital; Cowasji Jehangir Hall; Bombay House; Karachi Port Trust Building; The Institute of Science, Mumbai; L&T House

George Wittet (1878–1926) was a British architect who worked in the British Raj. Wittet mostly worked in the present-day city of Mumbai.

== Biography ==
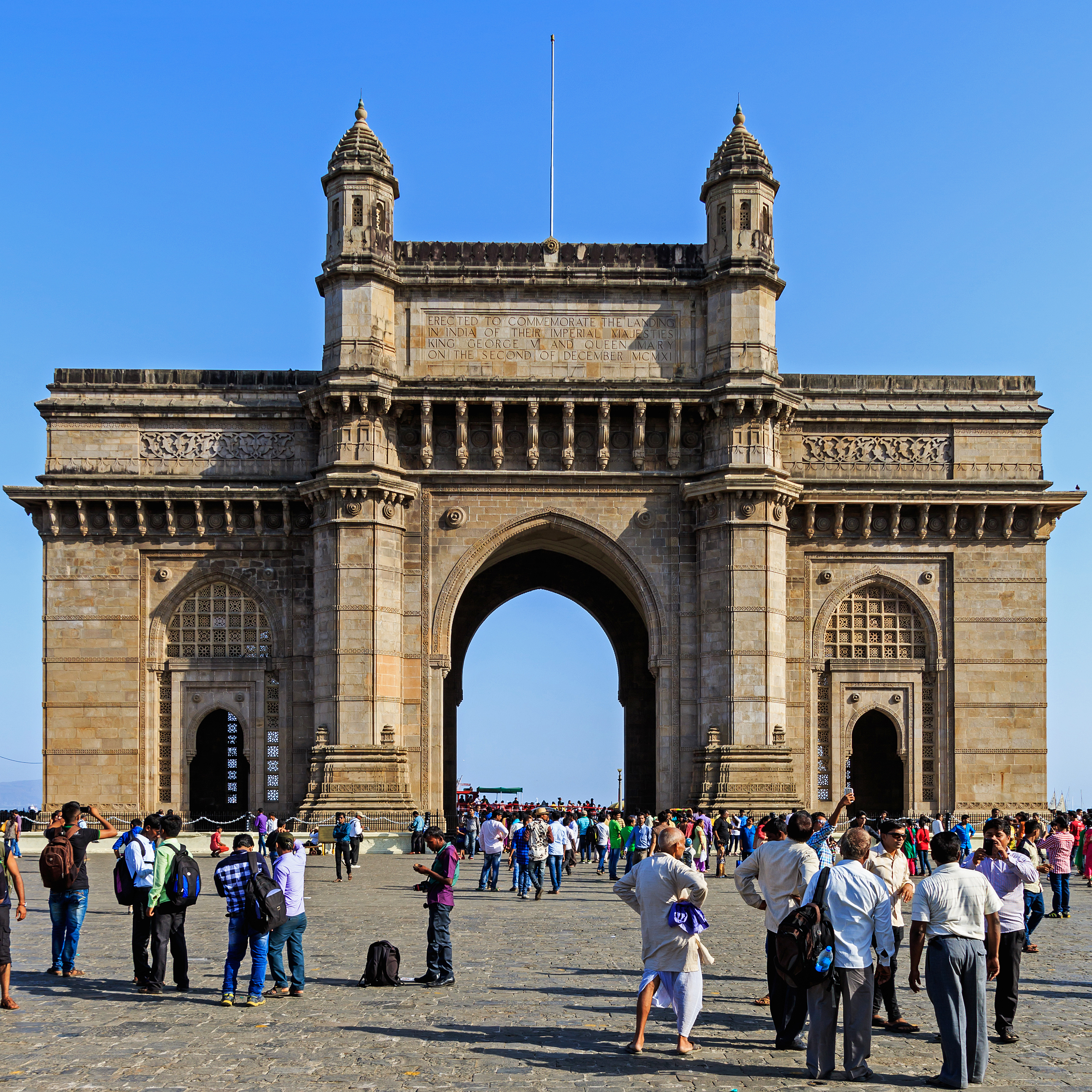
Wittet designed the iconic Gateway of India in Mumbai.

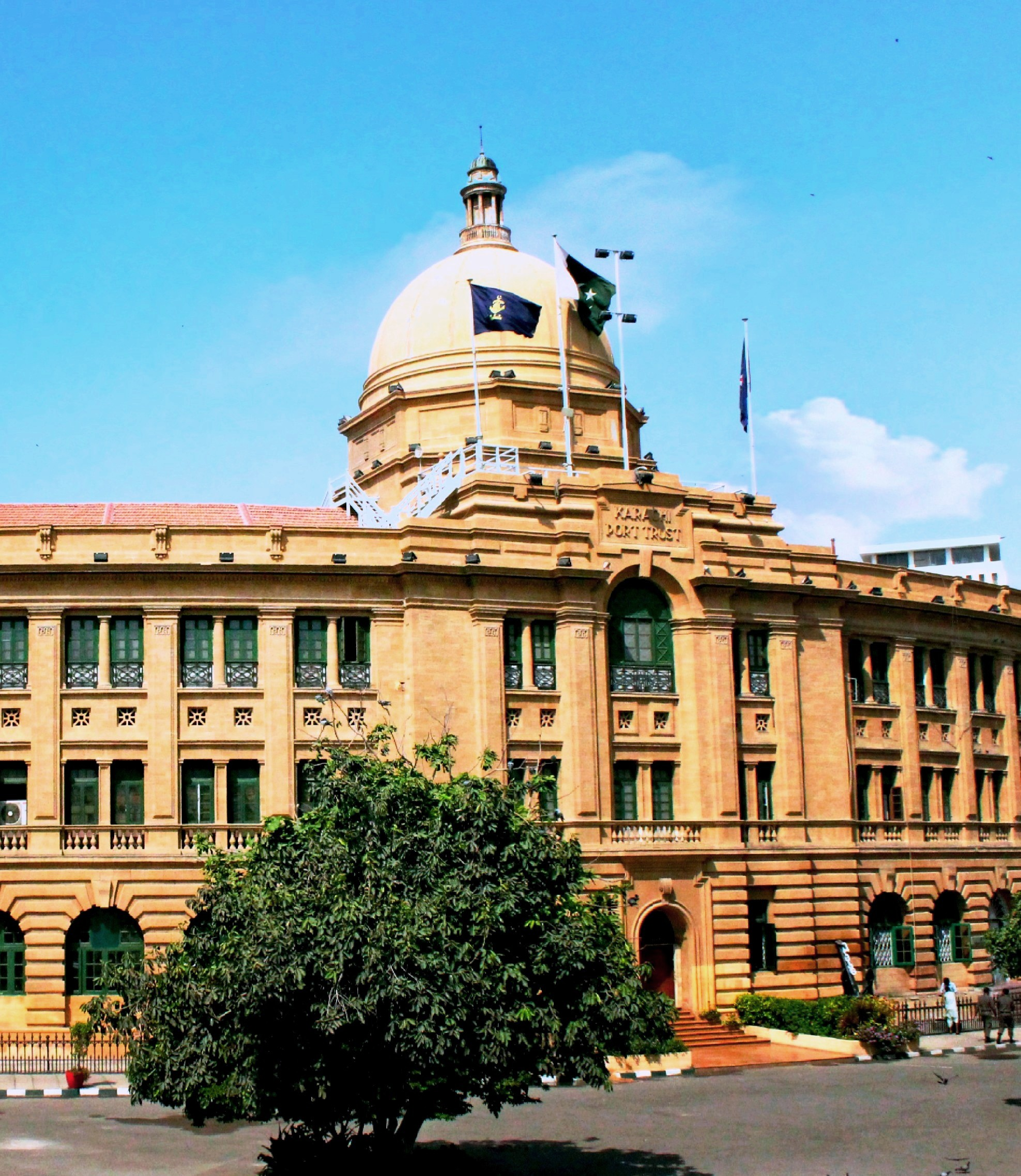
Wittet designed the Karachi Port Trust Building.

George Wittet was born in Blair Atholl, Scotland in 1878. He studied architecture with Mr. Heiton of Perth, Scotland, and worked in Edinburgh, Scotland and York, England before moving to British India.

Wittet arrived in India in 1904 and became an assistant to John Begg, then Consulting Architect to Mumbai. The two men played a large part in the development and popularization of Indo-Saracenic architecture, based on careful study of Indian models.

On 12 May 1917, Wittet, by then Consulting Architect to the Government of Mumbai, was unanimously elected as the first President of The Indian Institute of Architects.

Wittet designed some of Mumbai's best known landmarks: the Chhatrapati Shivaji Maharaj Vastu Saghralaya, the Gateway of India, the Institute of Science, the Small Causes Court at Dhobitalao, the Wadia Maternity Hospital, Bombay House, the King Edward Memorial Hospital, the Grand Hotel and other buildings at the Ballard Estate, by the Mumbai Docks.

In Karachi, he designed the Karachi Port Trust (KPT) building.

He died of acute dysentery in Mumbai in 1926, and is buried in the Sewri cemetery.
