= Karachi Port Trust Building =

Administrative building in Karachi, Pakistan

- عمارت امانت بندر کراچی
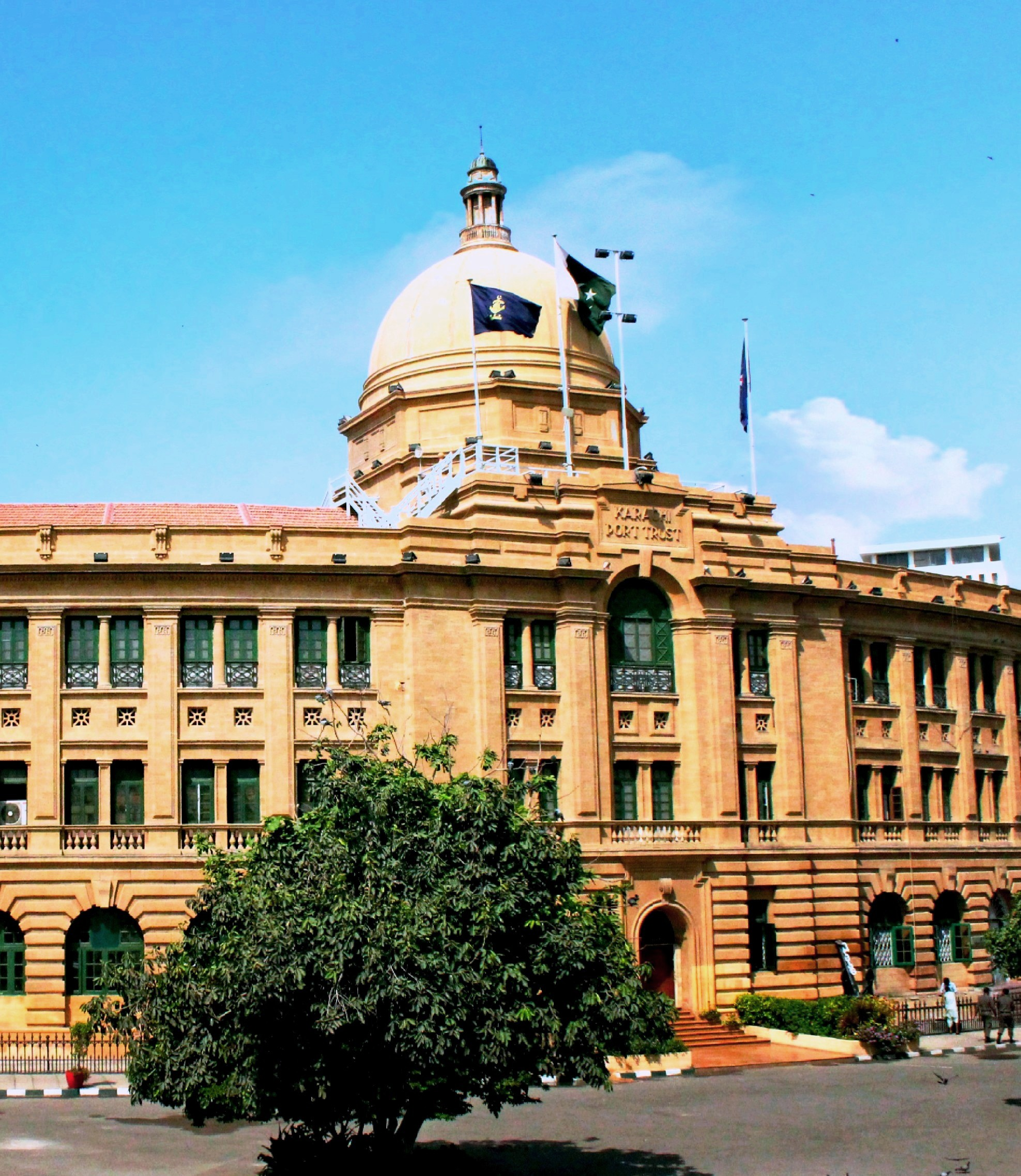
- The Karachi Port Trust Building, built between 1912 and 1916

General information
- Type: Headquarters for the Karachi Port Trust
- Location: Kharadar; Karachi; Pakistan
- Coordinates: 24.847377°N 66.993269°E
- Construction started: 1912
- Completed: 5 January 1916

Design and construction
- Architect: George Wittet

The Karachi Port Trust Building, (Note: Urdu: کراچی پورٹ ٹرسٹ بلڈنگ; Sindhi: ڪراچي پورٽ ٽرسٽ بلڊنگ) also referred to as the KPT Building, is a building in Karachi, Sindh, Pakistan that serves as headquarters for the Karachi Port Trust, which administers the Port of Karachi. The building dates from the height of the British Raj, and was inaugurated on 5 January 1916.

== Location ==
This building is located on Muhammad Ali Jinnah Road in central Karachi's Kharadar neighbourhood, near the Native Jetty Bridge and Merewether Clock Tower. It lies opposite the Qamar House on Eduljee Dinshaw Road.

== History ==
Karachi Port Trust Building was designed by George Wittet, who was also the architect of Chhatrapati Shivaji Maharaj Vastu Sangrahalaya. The building's construction commenced in 1912. The Napier Mole Road was extended to the site by 1914, and terminated at a spot known as Willingdon Place. The building was planned to be a showpiece for Karachi that would impress visitors arriving at the Port of Karachi.

It was completed in 1916 under the supervision of the Engineering Department - at a cost of 974,990 rupees. Marquess of Willingdon, the Governor of Bombay, inaugurated KPT Head Office Building on 5 January 1916, and the first meeting was held in the building on 12 January 1916, while it was formally handed over to the Karachi Port Trust on 7 February 1916. Despite its use for the port's administration, the building was immediately converted into the 500 bed "Indian General Hospital" for use during the First World War, and continued to function as a military hospital until May 1919. It is looked after by Pakistan Navy on many occasions.

== Structure ==
The building occupies about 1400 square metres, and is adjacent to the Imperial Customs House.

== Architecture ==
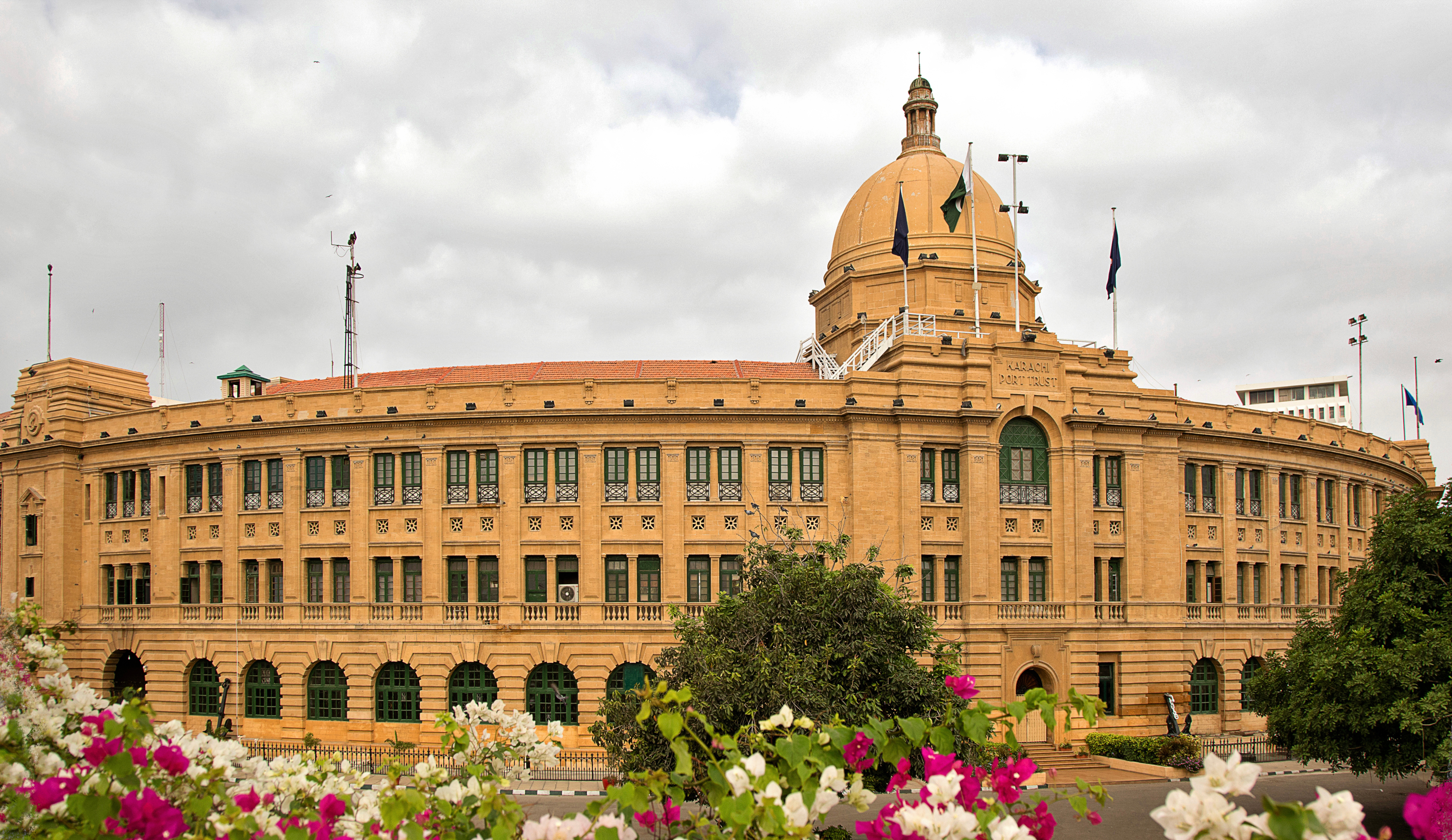
The building's façade is covered in yellow stone from Jaipur.

The building's architectural style is an amalgamation of British, Hindu and Gothic styles. It was designed by George Wittet, who was a consultant architect of the Government of Bombay. Wittet was also the architect of the Gateway of India in Bombay.

The building's façade was made of a yellow-toned stone from the Indian city of Jaipur. The building's exterior is notable for its curved façade. In the centre of the building’s curvature is a large dome designed in a Roman, rather than Islamic, style.

The exterior and interior of the building is decorated simply. Rooms are spacious, and feature high ceilings. Costly teak wood was extensively used throughout the building. The wood on the windows are decorated in a dark green colour. KPT Head office building had only one entrance with a huge door and 2 large anchors are kept on both sides. Striking arches of the corridors crafted in both exterior and interior, which is symbolic Roman Styled Architecture.

The floors are tiled with black & white colour and easily washable. These tiles are called cemented tiles, purposely made of by adding different colours in the cement. The usage of teak wood is found everywhere in the building, even the elevator is also wooden. While using the elevator, one can see each floor as the elevator features an open-cage design. There is only one railing back of the elevator, which is uncovered and mechanism of the elevator is visible.

On the buildings 2nd floor is located the Board Room, which is located under the dome. There are two huge arch shaped windows which have been painted. Old clocks there bear the name of Elliot Brother Company, London. There is another big Conference Room adjacent to the Board Room. Now, all the meetings are held in conference room. On 2nd floor, the third most important room is Record Room, which is used for keeping the records of the original proceeding and secret files. All the proceedings from 1893 till to date are kept here.

== Gallery ==
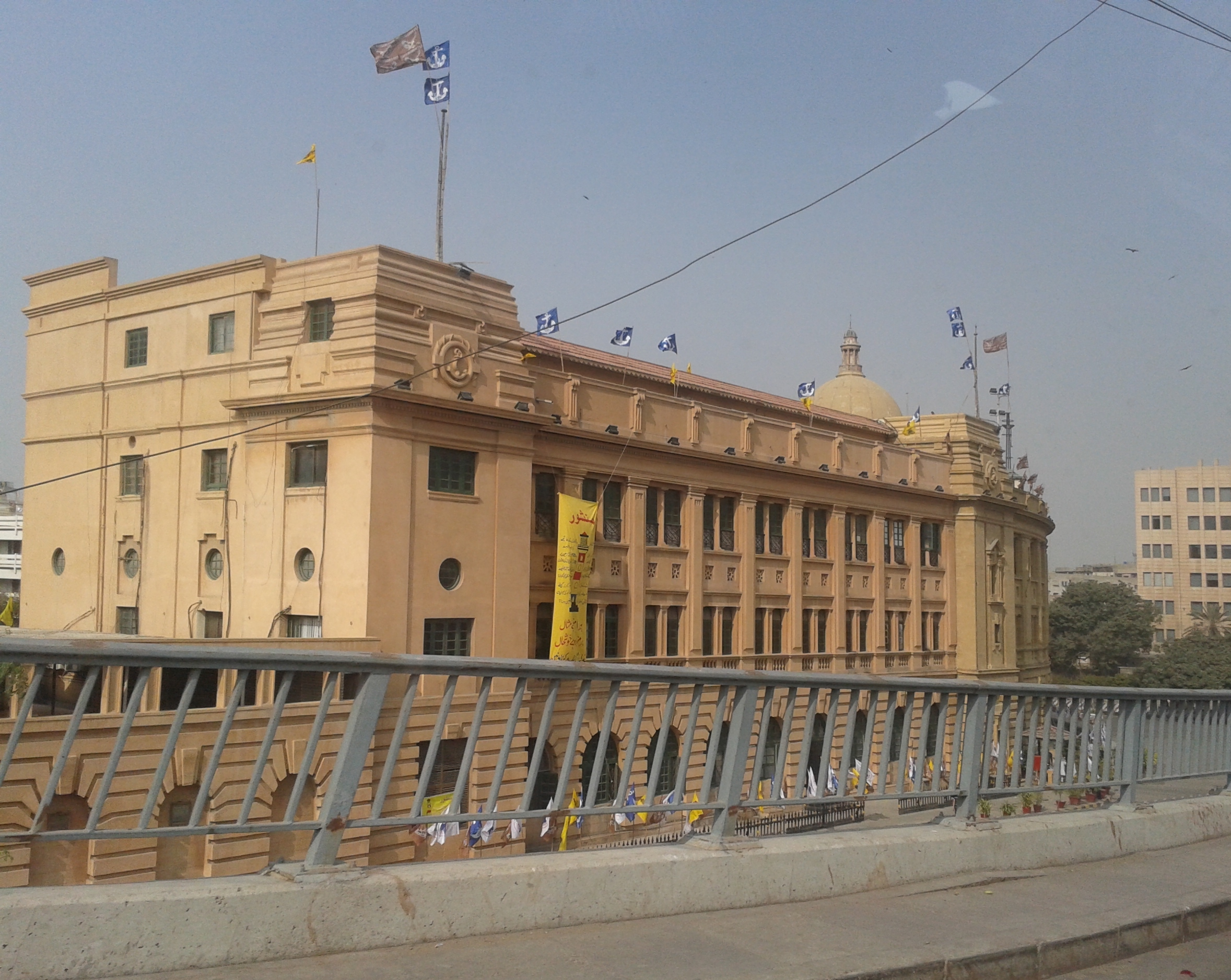
The building’s southeast facing façade

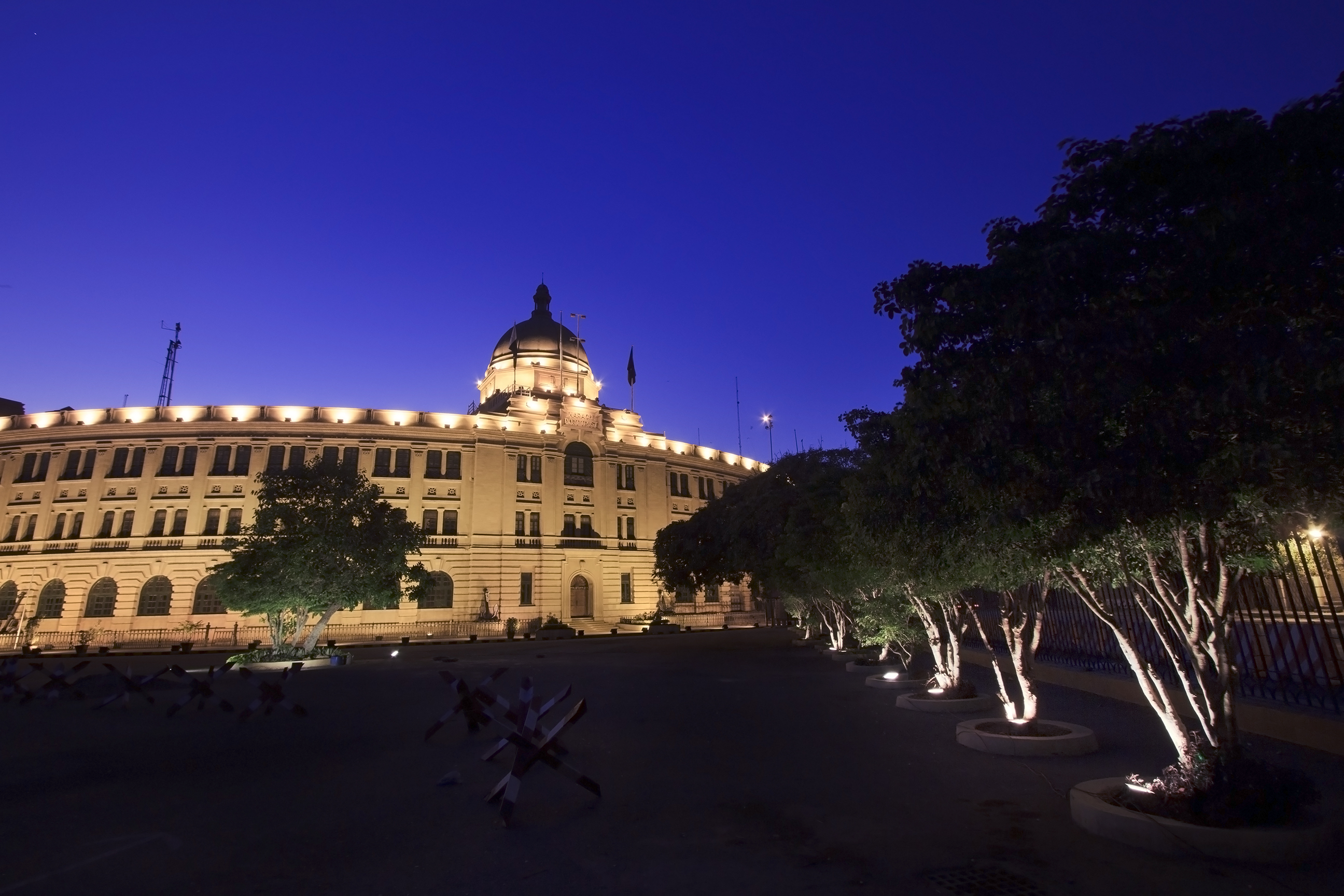

== See also ==
- Darya Lal Mandir
