= World Sustainable Development Summit =

Annual conference organized by the Energy and Resources Institute

- Date: March 1–3, 2027
- Location: India Habitat Centre in New Delhi, India
- Organized by: TERI
- Website: Official site

The World Sustainable Development Summit (WSDS) is an annual conference organized by The Energy and Resources Institute (TERI), an independent research institute with multidimensional capabilities. It was instituted in 2001, as the Delhi Sustainable Development Summit (DSDS). WSDS 2027 is the 26th edition of the Summit, to be held from 1–3 March 2027 at the India Habitat Centre, New Delhi, India, under the umbrella theme Converging Commitments: Collaborative Actions for a Resilient Planet. WSDS brings together political leaders, decision-makers from bilateral and multilateral institutions, business leaders, high-level functionaries from the diplomatic corps, scientists and researchers, media personnel, and members of civil society on a common platform. Over the years, the Summit series has witnessed the participation of 61 Heads of State and Government, 155 Ministers, 13 Nobel Laureates, 2,200+ Business Leaders, 4,000+ Speakers, and 44,000+ Delegates.

== Features of the World Sustainable Development Summit ==
1. Sustainable Development Leadership Award (SDLA): Awarded every year since 2005 to an eminent global leader, the award felicitates their contributions in the field of sustainable development.

2. Ministerial and High-level sessions: Part of the plenary segment of WSDS, these sessions have panel discussions designed around select themes of environmental importance linked with the overall theme of the Summit. Special addresses include Ministerial Addresses, Science Leadership Addresses, and Leadership Addresses. Speakers include policymakers, business leaders, and academics.

3. Thematic Tracks: The thematic tracks allow for discussions on finer nuances of the Summit's focus areas. These tracks engage domain experts and practitioners to provide feasible solutions to the challenges faced by the local and global communities in maintaining the balance between securing environmental sustainability and development.

4. Act4Earth: The Act4Earth initiative was launched in the valedictory session of WSDS 2022.

5. Stakeholder Dialogues: As part of the Act4Earth initiative, a series of Stakeholder Dialogues will be organised in the months of April and October 2024. The sessions will be on the topics of- SDG-Climate Synergies; Green Public Procurement and Climate Finance.

6. CEO Forum: A platform for industry captains to brainstorm ideas for conducting businesses in a sustainable manner.

7. Youth Connect: A platform to sensitize young students at the school and graduate level about issues of sustainable development and climate change by securing their participation in the Summit's discussions.

== Act4Earth ==
The Act4Earth Initiative was launched at the valedictory session of the 21st Edition of WSDS. As part of the initiative, TERI will engage in research activities that intend to identify and analyze practices with the potential for maximum impact across various sectors and systems while being fairly implementable by government and relevant state actors. By reaching out to policymakers, experts, and key stakeholders, the initiative will solicit their input and feedback to come up with policy recommendations aimed at furthering climate action and achieving the Sustainable Development Goals (SDGs).

== Delhi Sustainable Development Summit ==
Since 2001, TERI has annually organized the WSDS, earlier known as the Delhi Sustainable Development Summit, an international platform to facilitate the exchange of knowledge on all aspects of sustainable development. The event brought together various heads of state and government, thought leaders, policy-makers and members of industry and academia to deliberate on myriad issues.

The Summit series has emerged as the premier international event on sustainability that focuses on the global future, but with an eye on the actions in the developing world which could bend our common future.

== Sustainable Development Leadership Award ==
In 2005, The Energy and Resources Institute established the Sustainable Development Leadership Award to felicitate the efforts of global leaders in the field of sustainable development. The award winners are as follows:

Year	Name	Nationality	Position then
2005	Shoichiro Toyoda	Japan	Honorary Chairman of Toyota Motor Corporation
2006	Ernesto Zedillo	Mexico	Director of the Yale Center for the Study of Globalization
2007	Arnold Schwarzenegger	United States	Governor of California
2008	Maumoon Abdul Gayoom	Maldives	President of the Maldives
2009	Ban Ki-moon	South Korea	Secretary-General of the United Nations
2010	Yukio Hatoyama	Japan	Prime Minister of Japan
2011	Manmohan Singh	India	Prime Minister of India
2012	Tarja Halonen	Finland	President of Finland
2013	James Alix Michel	Seychelles	President of Seychelles
2014	Anand Mahindra	India	Chairman and managing director, Mahindra & Mahindra
2015	José Manuel Durão Barroso	Portugal	Former Prime Minister of Portugal and Former President of European Commission
2016	Pawan Kumar Chamling	India	Chief Minister of Sikkim state
2019	Frank Bainimarama	Fiji	Prime Minister of Fiji
2020	Jeffrey Sachs	United States	University Professor, Columbia University
2022	Michael Rubens Bloomberg	United States	Chair of the Defense Innovation Board
2025	Bharrat Jagdeo	Guyana	Vice President of Guyana
2025	Marina Silva	Brazil	Minister of the Environment and Climate Change
