= China Creek =

China Creek may refer to:

- China Creek (Wilbarger County, Texas), a stream in Texas
- China Creek (Columbia River), a stream in Washington
- Chinna Creek, lagoon in Karachi, Pakistan
