= Native Jetty Bridge =

Bridge in Karachi

Native Jetty Bridge پل نیٹو جیٹی
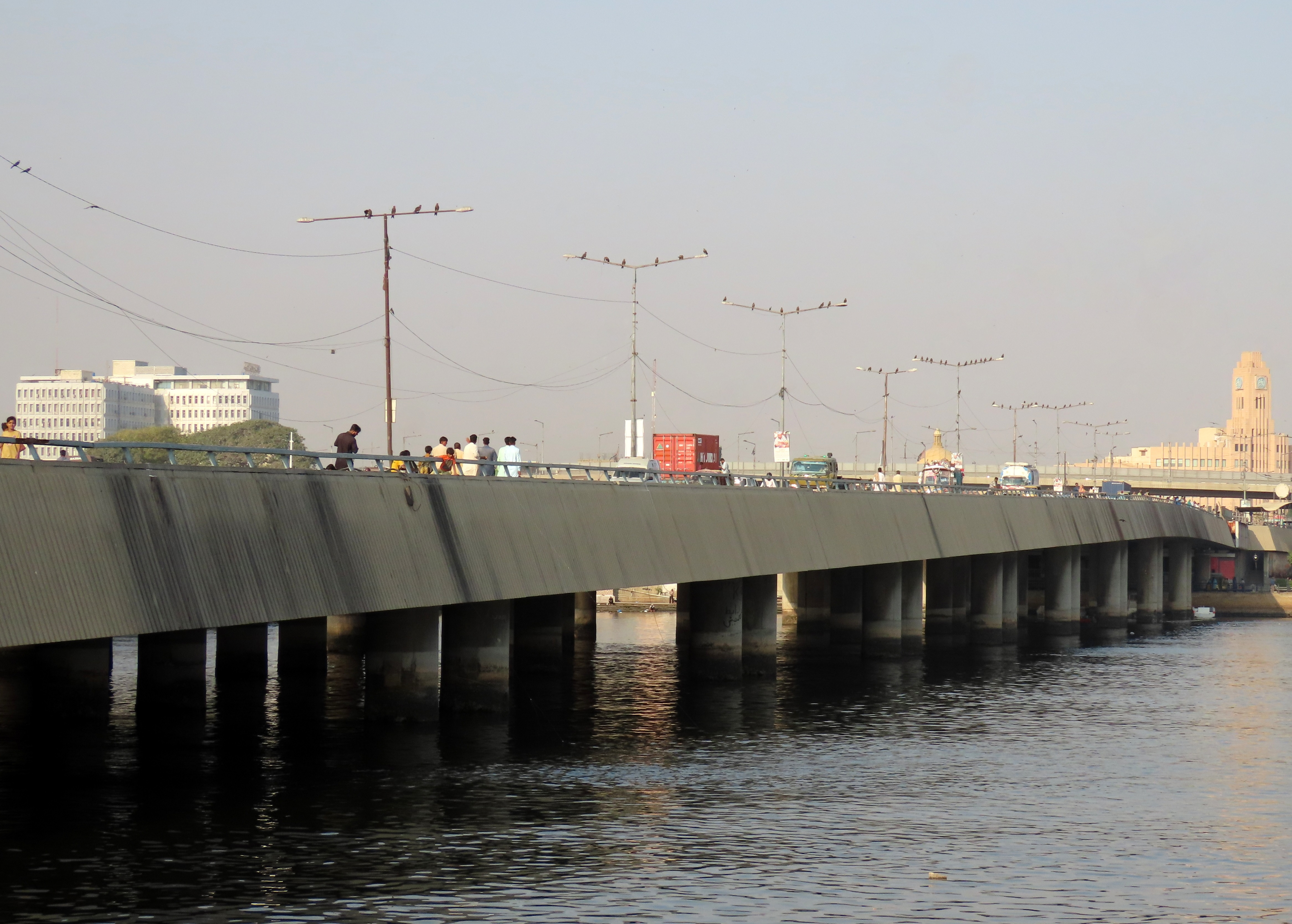
- Native Jetty Bridge as seen from Port Grand
- Coordinates: 24°50′35″N 66°59′26″E
- Official name: Native Jetty Bridge
- Other name: Napier Mole Bridge
- Named for: Charles Napier

Characteristics
- Total length: 167.64 m
- No. of lanes: 2

History
- Construction start: 1861
- Construction end: September 1864
- Construction cost: Rs 643,440

Location
- Interactive map of Native Jetty Bridge

Native Jetty Bridge, also known as Napier Mole Bridge, is a bridge located in Karachi, Sindh which connects the city with the Port of Karachi. It is one of the oldest bridges in Karachi.

== History ==
The modern port started its operations in 1854 during the British Raj, when a mole was constructed to connect the city to the harbour. When the British began constructing the mole, which partitioned the water area, they carefully considered whether closing the waterways on the western side of Chinna Creek would negatively impact the ships in the harbour. The mole was completed in 1864 at a cost of Rs 643,440, and an additional railway bridge was also built.

The bridge was built around the same time as other important bridges in the area. Due to increased traffic congestion, a new wider bridge, Jinnah Bridge, was constructed and replaced the old one. Today, the old bridge has been converted into a food street and named Port Grand Food and Entertainment Complex.

Running parallel to the two bridges is the Port Grand Train Track, also known as the Chinna Creek Bridge, which connects Karachi City Station to Kemari via the Karachi Monkey Yard. This 379-metre-long (1,243.4 ft) bridge, maintained by Pakistan Railways, is exclusively used for freight trains.

== See also ==
- Karachi Port Trust
