= TERI-Deakin Nanobiotechnology Centre =

Australian-Indian research institute

TERI-Deakin Nanobiotechnology Centre is a research center that is a joint venture between India's research thinktank TERI and Australia's Deakin University. Located in Gurgaon and founded in 2011, Haryana, it was inaugurated in April 2017 by Indian PM Narendra Modi and his Australian counterpart Malcolm Turnbull. It is the world's most advanced nanobiotechnology research centre, and aims to create innovative ideas to solve existing problems related to agriculture and other sectors in both the countries.
