= Bombay House =

Private building in India

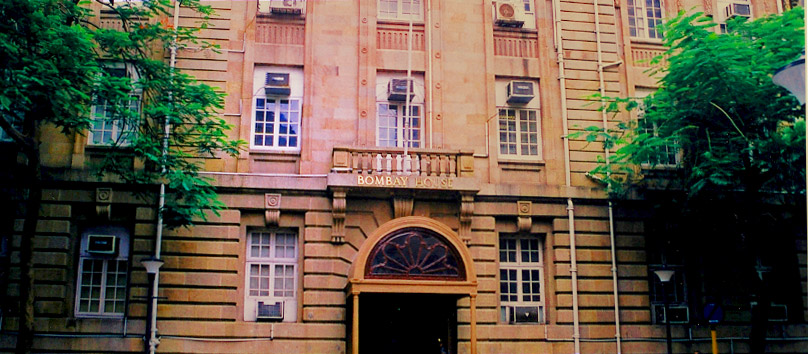
- Bombay House facade

General information
- Coordinates: 18°55′54″N 72°49′58″E
- Current tenants: Tata Group and Tata Sons
- Completed: 1924; 102 years ago
- Client: Sir Dorabji Tata
- Owner: Tata Group

Bombay House is a historic, privately owned heritage building in Mumbai's Fort area that serves as the Tata Group's headquarter. It is situated near Hutatma Chowk, and was completed in 1924. It has been the Tata Group's headquarters ever since. The building is a four-story colonial structure built with Malad stone and was designed by Scottish architect George Wittet, who designed over 40 buildings for the group and later became the head of Tata Engineering and Locomotive Company Limited, now Tata Motors.

The building houses the office of the chairman and all top directors of Tata Sons, the holding company. Core companies of the group-Tata Motors, Tata Steel, Tata Chemicals, Tata Power, Tata Industries, and Trent Limited operate from Bombay House.

== History ==
A plot of ground measuring 2,365 yd^{2} (1,977 m^{2}) was put up by the Bombay Municipality for sale in Bombay (now Mumbai) and then purchased by the Tata Group. It was observed that the various Tata concerns could not be accommodated in Navsari buildings and Navsari Chambers which they had been occupying since 1904. The Tata Group is perhaps the only Indian corporate to name its headquarters after a city where it started its journey. Bombay House, the global corporate HQ of the group. At that time, the group ran four businesses-textiles, hotels, steel and power-under the leadership of Sir Dorabji Tata, the elder son of group founder Jamsetji Tata. It was from this Edwardian building that Dorabji Tata diversified the portfolio into insurance, soaps, detergents and cooking oil. And it is in this building where the first Indian airline was conceptualised (1932) and where the largest global acquisition (Corus, for US$13 billion in 2007) by an Indian group was made.

The four-storey Bombay House is owned by The Associated Building Company, part of the Tata Group. The task of this company is largely to manage the building. It earns rent from the companies that have offices within the premises which houses about 400 people.

The interiors of Bombay House have remained almost unchanged for many decades. After Ratan Tata occupied the corner office in 1991, he retained the set-up of the office left by his predecessor, J. R. D. Tata, for several years. Later, the furniture, including his table, armchair and office stationery, was shifted to Pune where a replica of JRD's office has been set up on the first floor of Tata Central Archives Building. Additions at Bombay House include a visitor's lobby at the entrance on the ground floor.

On 9 February 2011, a major fire broke out in the Bombay House, causing three deaths and one injury. The basement, where the fire took place, had housed the office of Tata Sports Club which has now shifted out of the building.
