= China Creek (Columbia River tributary) =

River in Washington, United States

Coordinates: 48°42′52″N 118°02′03″W

China Creek is a stream in the U.S. state of Washington. It is a tributary of the Columbia River.

China Creek was named for the Chinese prospectors who operated in the area.

== See also ==
- List of rivers of Washington
