= Karachi Port Trust =

Government organization

- اعتماد بندرگاہ کراچی; Karachi Port Trust
- The logo of the Karachi Port Trust.

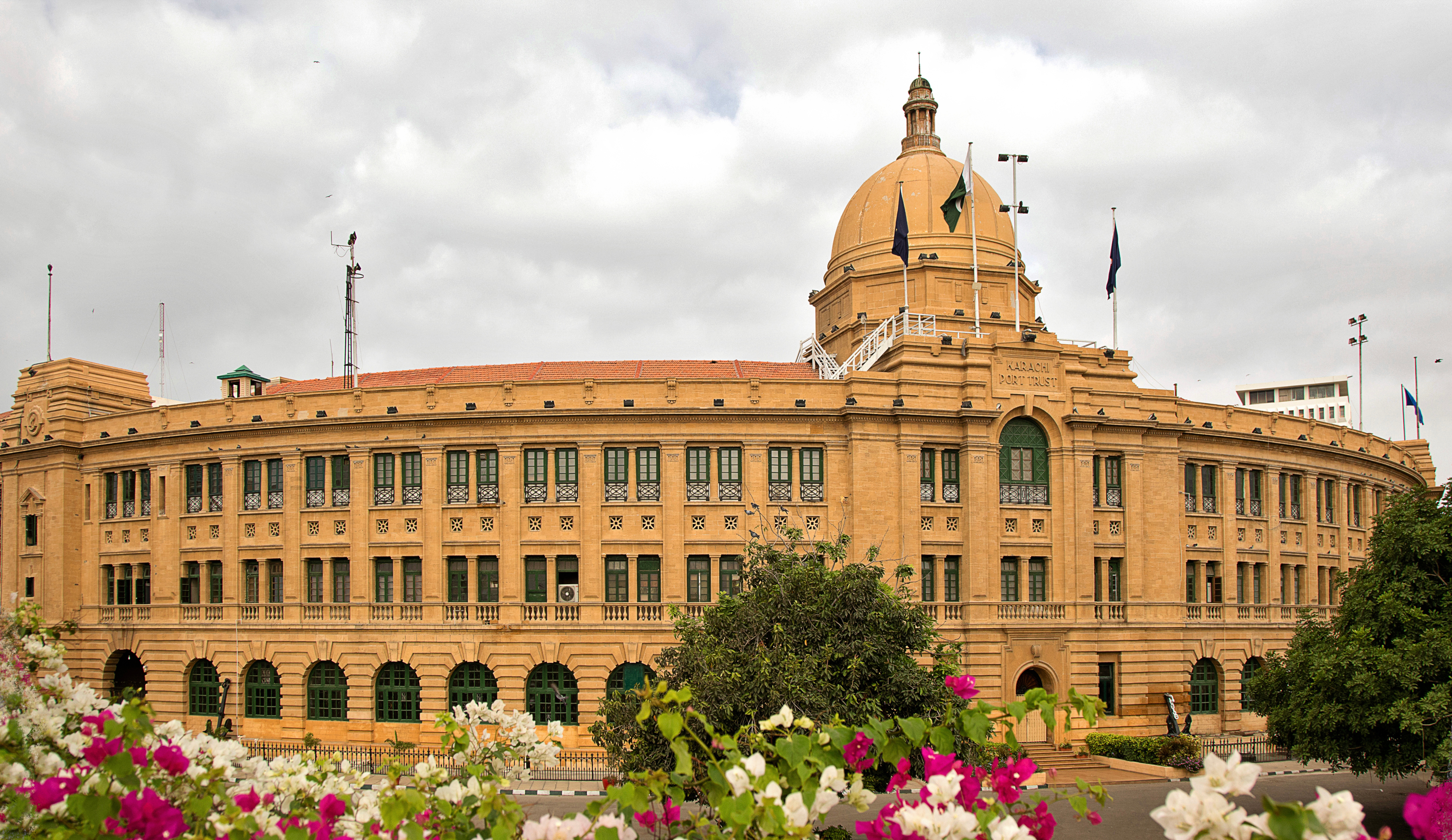
- Administrative offices at the Karachi Port Trust Building

Federal Government overview
- Formed: 1887
- Headquarters: Karachi, Pakistan
- Minister responsible: Muhammad Junaid Anwar Chaudhry, Federal Minister for Maritime Affairs
- Federal Government executive: Rear Admiral Shahid Ahmed SI(M), S. Bt (Retd), Chairman
- Parent Federal Government: Ministry of Maritime Affairs
- Website: http://kpt.gov.pk/

The Karachi Port Trust (KPT) (Urdu: اعتماد بندرگاہ کراچی) is a federally administered Public Sector organization , falls under the Ministry of Maritime Affairs that oversees the operations of the Port of Karachi, one of South Asia's largest and busiest deep-water seaports which handles over 54% of the nation's foreign trade. The agency is headquartered at the colonial-era Karachi Port Trust Building constructed in 1915..The building was formally inaugurated on 5 January 1916 by Lord Willingdon, Governor of Bombay.

Karachi Port Trust, established under Act IV of 1886, the Karachi Port Trust formally came into existence on 1 April 1887, succeeding the Karachi Harbour Board, which administered the port between 1880 and 1887.

The Karachi Port is governed by board of trustees of the Karachi Port Trust, consisting of the chairman and ten trustees. The chairman, appointed by the federal government, serves as the chief executive officer of the organization and is supported by eight general managers. The current chairman is Rear Admiral Shahid Ahmed SI(M), S. Bt (Retd). Currently, KPT employs approximately 3415 workers and 311 officers, ensuring efficient port operations and administration..

In addition to its operational mandate, the Karachi Port Trust is entrusted with the protection and preservation of the marine ecosystem in and around the Port of Karachi. KPT has initiated and implemented several environmental sustainability programs, including efforts to protect and expand mangrove forests, reinforcing its commitment to ecological conservation.

The Karachi Port Trust comprises three wharves:

- East Wharf
- West Wharf
- South Wharf

| Total Dry Cargo/ General Purpose berths | 37 Berths |
| Total Oil Piers | 03 Berths |
| TOTAL | 40 Berths at Karachi Port |

== Terminal operator concessions granted ==
- Karachi Gateway Terminal (Private) Limited (KGTL) operates a container terminal port at berths 6-10 on the East Wharf of Karachi Port. The 50-year term concession was signed between AD Ports Group - majority shareholder in KGTL - and Karachi Port Trust. KGTL will grow the container handling capacity to 1 million TEUs per annum. KGTL will also undertake dredging to enable berthing of larger and deeper vessels. Under the concession, KGTL is undertaking capacity expansion to increase container handling to one million TEUs per annum, along with capital dredging works to accommodate larger and deeper-draft vessels. The terminal covers an area of approximately 270,000 square metres, has a draft depth of 13 metres, and an existing handling capacity of 800,000 TEUs.
- Karachi Gateway Terminal Multipurpose (Private) Limited (KGTML) operates a bulk and general cargo terminal at berths 11-17 on the East Wharf of Karachi Port. The 25-years term concession was signed between AD Ports Group - majority shareholder in KGTML - and Karachi Port Trust. KGTML will increase the terminal handling capacity from 8 million tons per annum to 14 million tons per annum. . The terminal covers an area of approximately 477,855 square metres, has a draft depth of 13 metres, and a designed terminal capacity of 16 million tonnes per annum.
- Karachi International Container Terminal (KICT), operated by Hutchison Ports, runs a container terminal at berths 26–30 on the West Wharf of Karachi Port. The terminal covers an area of approximately 260,348.55 square metres, has a draft depth of 13 metres, and a handling capacity of 750,000 TEUs.
- South Asia Pakistan Terminals (SAPT), operated by Hutchison Ports, runs a container terminal on the South Wharf of Karachi Port . A 25-year concession agreement was signed between Hutchison Ports, the parent company of SAPT, and the Karachi Port Trust. The 25-year term concession was signed between Hutchison Ports - parent company of SAPT - and Karachi Port Trust..The terminal occupies an area of approximately 850,000 square metres, has a draft depth of 18 metres, and a designed handling capacity of 3.1 million TEUs.
