= Districts of Pakistan =

Third-level administrative units of Pakistan

- Category: Third-level administrative division
- Location: Islamic Republic of Pakistan
- Number: 173 (as of 2026)
- Populations: Greatest: Lahore, Punjab — 13,004,135 (2023); Least: Harnai, Balochistan — 127,571 (2023)
- Areas: Largest: Chagai, Balochistan — 44,748 km^{2} (17,277 sq mi); Smallest: Nazimabad (Karachi Central), Sindh — 69 km^{2} (27 sq mi)
- Government: District government
- Subdivisions: Tehsils Union councils

The districts of Pakistan (Urdu: اِضلاعِ پاكِستان) are the third-level administrative divisions of Pakistan, below provinces and divisions, but forming the first-tier of local government. In total, there are 173 districts in Pakistan. excluding Islamabad Capital Territory. These districts are further divided into tehsils and union councils.

== History ==
In 1947, when Pakistan gained independence there were 124 districts. In 1969, 2 new districts (Tangail and Patuakhali) in East Pakistan were formed, bringing the total to 126. With the Independence of Bangladesh, Pakistan lost 20 of its districts and so there were 106 districts. In 2001, the number was reduced to 102 by the merger of the 5 districts of Karachi Central, Karachi East, Karachi South, Karachi West and Malir to form Karachi District. The number of districts rose to 106 again in December 2004, when four new districts were created in the province of Sindh of which one (Umerkot) had existed until 2000 and three districts (Kashmore, Qambar and Jamshoro) were newly created. (Note: No data is available on the recently created districts of Sindh Province.) The new districts were carved out of Mirpur Khas, Jacobabad, Larkana and Dadu Districts respectively. In May 2005, the Punjab provincial government created a new district by raising the status of Nankana Sahib from a tehsil of Sheikhupura District to a district in its own right. (Note: No data is available on the recently created district of Nankana, which was part of Sheikhupura District.) On 11 July 2011, the Sindh Government restored again the districts of Karachi South, Karachi East, Malir, Karachi West and Karachi Central, then later in 2013, the district of Korangi was carved out of Karachi East District. In Azad Jammu and Kashmir, a second-tier of government was formed from three administrative divisions into ten districts. In Gilgit–Baltistan, there are ten districts divided between the two regions of Gilgit and Baltistan. In 2018, Federally Administered Tribal Areas (FATA) was merged with Khyber Pakhtunkhwa province and FATA agencies were converted into districts.

Chagai is the largest district of Pakistan by area while Lahore District is the largest by population with a total population of 11,126,285 at the 2017 census. Quetta is the largest district of Balochistan by population with a total population of 2,275,699 at the 2017 census. Bahawalpur is the largest district of Punjab by area. Chitral is the largest by area and Peshawar is the largest by population from Khyber Pakhtunkhwa with a population of 4,269,079 in the 2017 census. Sindh's largest district by area is Tharparkar and by population its Karachi West with a population of 3,914,757 in the 2017 census. The combined population of the six districts of Karachi division is over 16 million in the 2017 census, giving an average population for these six districts of Karachi division of over 2.675 million each. Neelum and Kotli are the largest districts of Azad Kashmir by area and population respectively. Gilgit is the largest by area and population both for Gilgit-Baltistan.

As of the 2023 census, all of Pakistan's districts have a muslim majority except for Umerkot district.

== Administration ==
=== Deputy commissioner ===
A deputy commissioner (popularly abbreviated to "DC") is the executive head of the district. Deputy commissioners are appointed by the government from the Pakistan Administrative Service.

=== District council ===
A district council (or zila council) is a local government body at the district level.

The functions of a district council include construction and maintenance of roads, and bridges, building hospitals and dispensaries, schools and educational institutions, health facilities and sanitation, tube wells for drinking water, rest houses, and coordination of activities of the Union councils within the district.

== Provinces and territories ==
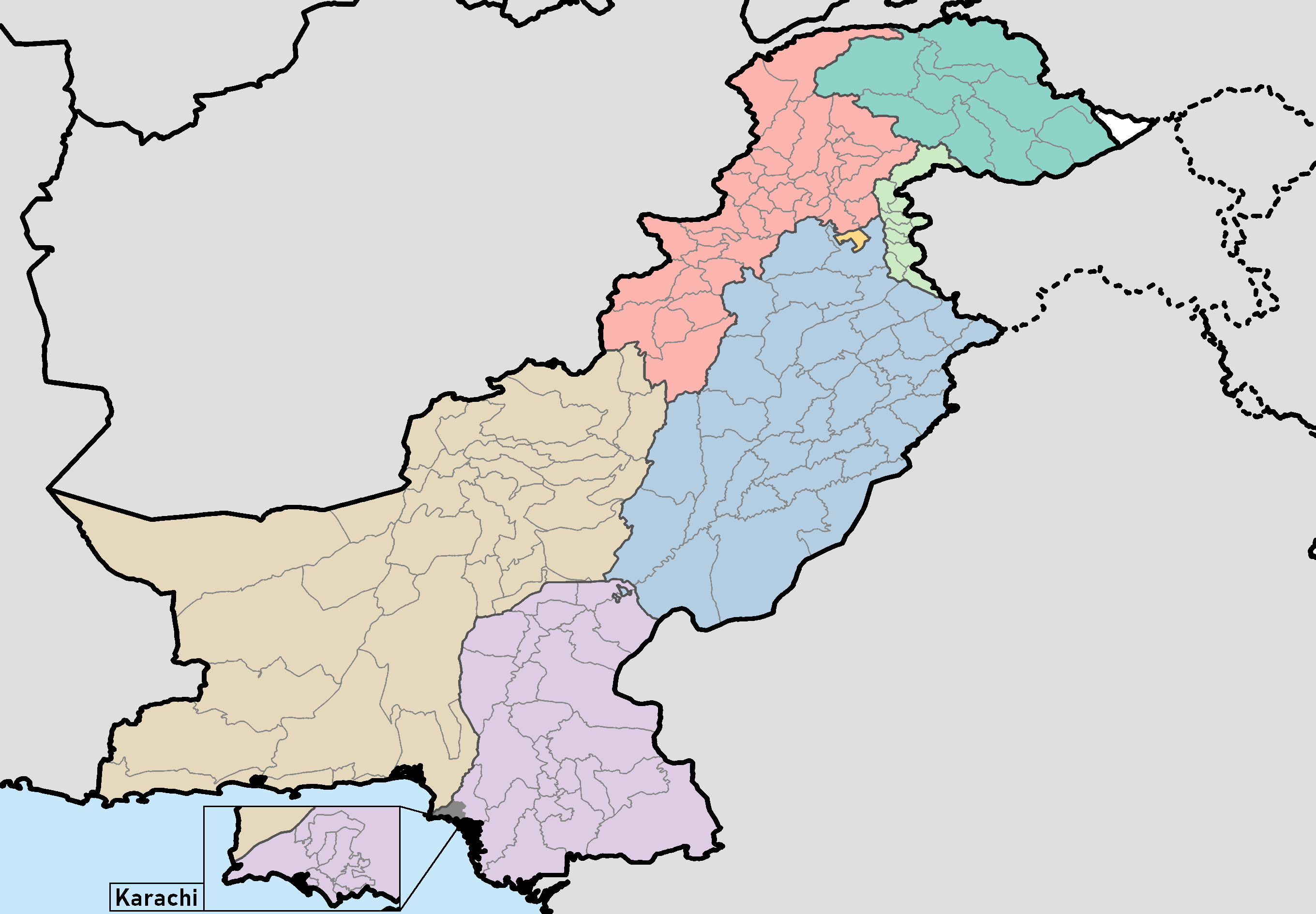
Districts of Pakistan

Sr. No.	Province or territory	Division(s)	District(s)	Area (km^{2})	Population (2023)	Population (2017)	Density 2017 (people/km^{2})
1	Azad Jammu and Kashmir	3	10	13,297		4,045,366	304.23
2	Balochistan	8	36	347,190	14,894,402	12,344,408	35.55
3	Gilgit-Baltistan	3	14	72,971		1,492,924	47.96
4	Islamabad Capital Territory	-	-	906	2,363,863	2,006,572	2,214.76
5	Khyber Pakhtunkhwa	7	40	101,741	40,856,097	35,525,047	349.17
6	Punjab	10	41	205,344	127,688,922	110,012,442	535.74
7	Sindh	6	30	140,914	55,696,147	47,886,051	339.82
	Pakistan	37	169	882,363	~241,499,431	213,312,810	

== List of districts by province and territory ==
=== Azad Jammu and Kashmir ===
District	Headquarter	Area (km^{2})	Population (2017)	Density (people/km^{2})	Literacy Rate (2023)	Map
Muzaffarabad	Muzaffarabad	1,642	650,370	396		
Hattian Bala	Hattian Bala	854	230,529	270		
Neelam Valley	Athmuqam	3,621	191,251	53		
Mirpur	Mirpur	1,010	456,200	452		
Bhimber	Bhimber	1,516	420,624	277		
Kotli	Kotli	1,862	774,194	416		
Poonch	Rawalakot	855	500,571	585		
Bagh	Bagh	770	371,919	483		
Haveli	Forward Kahuta	598	152,124	254		
Sudhanoti	Pallandari	569	297,584	523		
Total		13,297	4,045,367			

=== Gilgit-Baltistan ===
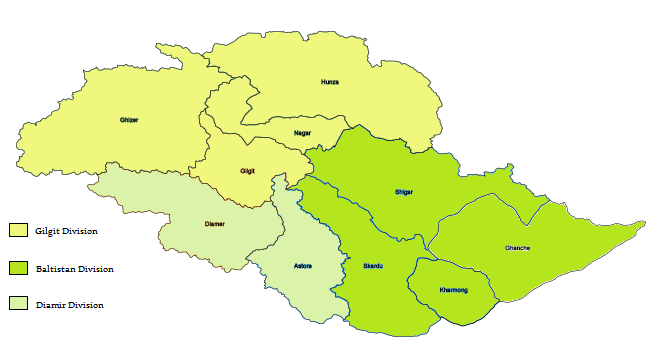
Administrative divisions and districts of Gilgit-Baltistan

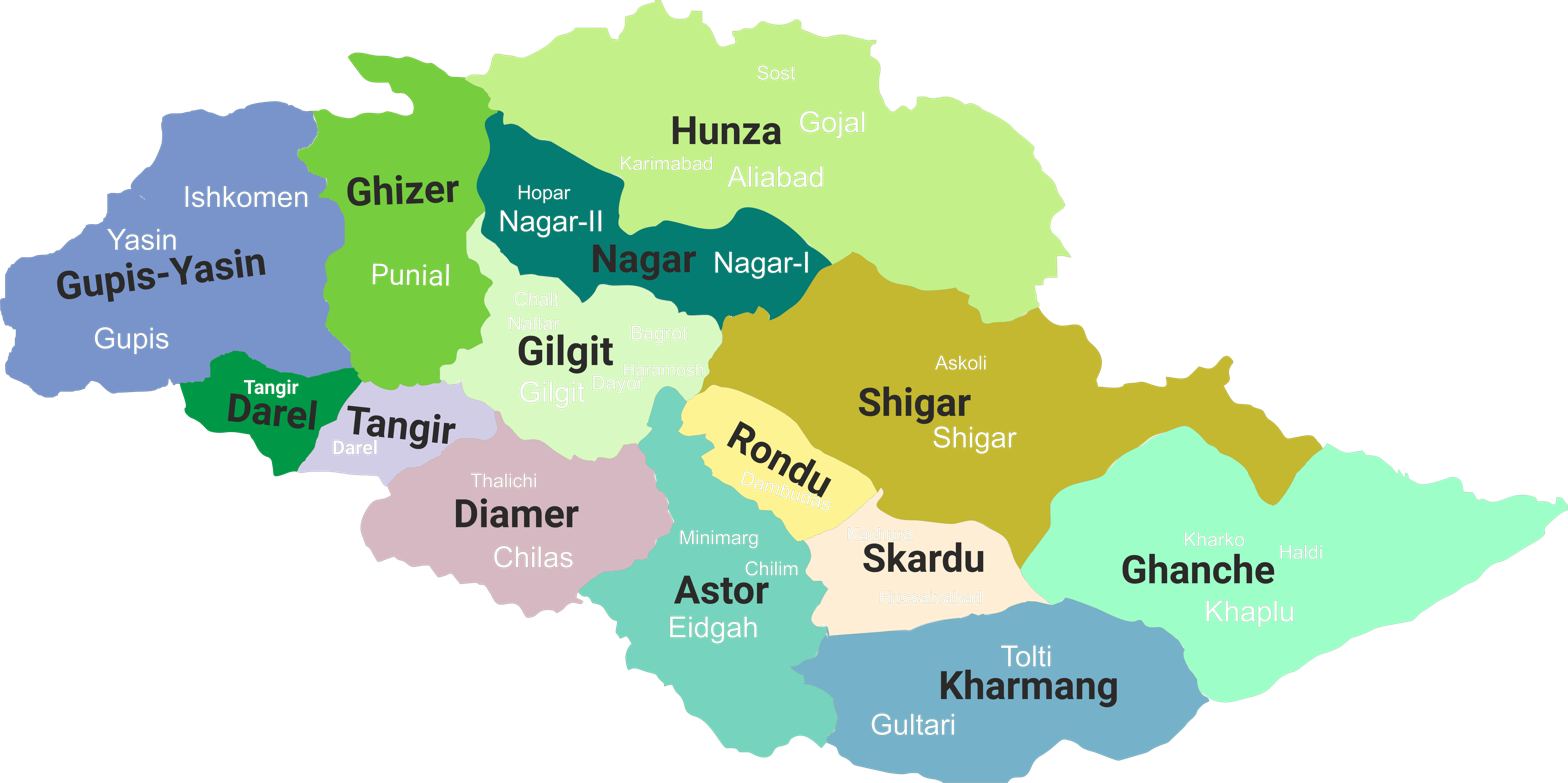
Gilgit-Baltistan's map with districts

The figures for area and population are according to the statistics issued by the Planning and Development Department of the Government of Gilgit Baltistan.

Division	District	Area (km^{2})	Capital	Number of Tehsils	Population (2023)	Divisional Capital
Baltistan	Ghanche	8,531	Khaplu	6	157,822	Skardu
Baltistan	Shigar	4,173	Shigar	2	84,608	Skardu
Baltistan	Kharmang	6,144	Kharmang	1	61,304	Skardu
Baltistan	Skardu	10,168	Skardu	4	278,885	Skardu
Gilgit	Gilgit	4,208	Gilgit	3	324,552	Gilgit
Gilgit	Ghizer	12,381	Gahkuch	5	200,069	Gilgit
Gilgit	Hunza	10,109	Aliabad	3	65,497	Gilgit
Gilgit	Nagar	4,137	Nagar	3	87,410	Gilgit
Diamer	Diamer	7,234	Chilas	5	337,329	Chilas
Diamer	Astore	5,411	Eidghah	2	111,573	Chilas
Total		72,496		34	1,709,049	

=== Balochistan ===
Districts of Balochistan. Note: numbers don't match those of the table.

District	Capital	Area (km^{2}) (2023)	Population (2023)	Density (people/km^{2}) (2023)	Literacy rate (2023)	HDI (2023)	Division
Kalat	Kalat	7,654	272,506	35.6	39.97%		Khuzdar
Surab	Surab	4,783	429,966	89.8	43.41%		Khuzdar
Wadh	Wadh	17,355	381,599	21.9	51.07%		Khuzdar
Khuzdar	Khuzdar	10,747	428,037	39.8	36.40%		Khuzdar
Awaran	Awaran	29,510	178,958	6.0	39.97%		Lasbela
Hub	Hub	6,716	382,885	57.0	51.07%		Lasbela
Lasbela	Lasbela	11,694	334,472	28.6	36.40%		Lasbela
Chaman	Chaman	1,341	466,218	347.7	39.97%		Pishin
Pishin	Pishin	6,218	835,482	134.6	51.07%		Pishin
Barshore	Barshore	2,288	141,994	62.06	37.61%		Pishin
Qila Abdullah	Jungle Pir Alizai	3,553	361,971	102.3	36.40%		Pishin
Quetta East	Quetta	3,447	2,595,492	754.3	56.29%		Quetta
Quetta West	Quetta	3,308	313,271	94.7	35.97%		Quetta
Mastung	Mastung	5,896	313,271	94.7	35.97%		Quetta
Sohbatpur	Sohbatpur	802	240,106	299.6	41.02%		Nasirabad
Nasirabad	Dera Murad Jamali	3,387	563,315	166.1	28.96%		Nasirabad
Usta Muhammad	Usta Muhammad	953	292,060	280	35.53%		Nasirabad
Jafarabad	Dera Allahyar	690	302498	361.1	35.53 %		Nasirabad
Jhal Magsi	Gandava	3,615	203,368	56.2	30.14%		Nasirabad
Chagai	Dalbandin	19,338	219,308	11.3	33.15%		Rakhshan
Washuk	Washuk	21,430	247038	9.1	21.58%		Rakhshan
Taftan	Taftan	37,073	105,469	2.8	41.07%		Rakhshan
Kharan	Kharan	14,958	260,352	17.4	41.07%		Rakhshan
Nushki	Nushki	5,797	207,834	35.9	57.12%		Rakhshan
Harnai	Harnai	3,301	189,535	57.4	43.37%		Sibi
Dera Bugti	Dera Bugti	3,839	190,191	30.0	25.9%		Sibi
Sibi	Sibi	7,121	224,148	31.5	47.41%		Sibi
Kacchi	Dhadar	5,682	442,674	77.9	30.2%		Sibi
Kohlu	Kohlu	7,610	260,220	34.2	28.53%		Koh e Sulaiman
Upper Dera Bugti	Baiker	6,321	165,083	30.0	25.9%		Koh e Sulaiman
Barkhan	Barkhan	3,514	210,249	59.83	33.62%		Koh e Sulaiman
Loralai	Loralai	3,785	398,832	105.4	54.16%		Loralai
Ziarat	Ziarat	3,301	189,535	57.4	43.37%		Loralai
Musakhel	Musakhel	5,728	182,275	31.82	36.60%		Loralai
Duki	Duki, Pakistan	4,233	205,044	48.44	44.18%		Loralai
Panjgur	Panjgur	16,891	509,781	30.18	42.07%		Makran
Gwadar	Gwadar	12,637	305,160	24.14	50.30%		Makran
Kech	Turbat	19,138	857,118	44.78	49.65%		Makran
Tump	Tump	3,401	203/813	59.92	51.0%		Makran
Zhob	Zhob	15,987	355,692	22.2	36.62%		Zhob
Killa Saifullah	Killa Saifullah	6,831	380,200	55.7	32.96%		Zhob
Sherani	Sherani	4,310	191,687	44.5	23.86%		Zhob

Former district

- Lehri District abolished in 2018.
- Karezat-Barshore District created on 21 November 2022, on 22 November Barshore tehsil minus from karezat-barshore District and barshore tehsil merge again in Pishin district Later on 29 November 2022 Balochistan Government Abolished Karezat District.

=== Khyber Pakhtunkhwa ===
Districts of Khyber Pakhtunkhwa.

Below you will find a list of all 38 districts in the province of Khyber Pakhtunkhwa, along with the division it belongs to, the area of the district, the population and population density of the district, the average annual population growth rate of each district (between 1998 and 2017), and a map showing its location. The districts are initially listed in alphabetical order, but they can be sorted in different ways by clicking the headers of the table.

District	Headquarter	Area (km^{2})	Pop. (2023)	Density (ppl/km^{2})	Lit. Rate (2023)	Average Annual Pop. Growth Rate (1998 - 2017)	Map	Division
Abbottabad	Abbottabad	1,967	1,419,072	721.6	77.34%	2.20% ▲		Hazara
Allai	Allai Valley	804	218,149	271.33	25.71%	2.10%		Hazara
Battagram	Battagram	497	335,984	676.02	31.20%	2.12%		Hazara
Haripur	Haripur	1,725	1,174,783	681.3	74.88%	1.97% ▲		Hazara
Kolai Palas	Kolai	1,410	280,162	198.7	18.80%	2.71% ▲		Hazara
Torghar	Judba	454	200,445	441.6	29.74%	2.64% ▲		Hazara
Upper Kohistan	Dasu	5,440	422,947	77.8	19.05%	2.69% ▲		Hazara
Lower Kohistan	Pattan	642	340,017	529.5	22.05%	2.70% ▲		Hazara
Mansehra	Mansehra	4,125	1,797,177	435.6	63.79%	2.47% ▲		Hazara
Hangu	Hangu	1,097	528,902	482.3	43.15%	2.66% ▲		Kohat
Karak	Karak	3,372	815,878	241.9	65.36%	2.63% ▲		Kohat
Kohat	Kohat	2,991	1,234,661	412.9	58.55%	2.85% ▲		Kohat
Kurram	Parachinar	3,380	785,434	232.4	35.22%	1.71% ▲		Kohat
Orakzai	Kalaya	1,538	387,561	252.0	33.57%	0.64% ▲		Kohat
Bannu	Bannu	1,972	1,357,890	688.6	41.75%	2.96% ▲		Bannu
Lakki Marwat	Lakki Marwat	3,296	1,040,856	315.8	48.47%	3.18% ▲		Bannu
North Waziristan	Miranshah	4,707	693,332	147.3	32.82%	2.17% ▲		Bannu
Khyber	Landi Kotal	2,576	1,146,267	445.0	38.45%	3.15% ▲		Peshawar
Mohmand	Ghalanai	2,296	553,933	241.2	31.28%	1.77% ▲		Peshawar
Nowshera	Nowshera	1,748	1,740,705	995.8	56.78%	2.94% ▲		Peshawar
Peshawar	Peshawar	1,518	4,758,762	3,135.6	53.28%	3.93% ▲		Peshawar
Charsadda	Charsadda	996	1,835,504	1,843.1	53.94%	2.43% ▲		Peshawar
Dera Ismail Khan	Dera Ismail Khan	7,677	1,423,344	185.4	35.67%	1.30% ▲		Dera Ismail Khan
Upper South Waziristan	Spinkai	2,815	367,364	130.5	38.27%	...		Dera Ismail Khan
Lower South Waziristan	Wana	3,805	307,851	80.9	20.96%	...		Dera Ismail Khan
Tank	Tank	2,900	470,293	162.2	40.67%	2.54% ▲		Dera Ismail Khan
Paharpur	Paharpur	1,657	406,467	245.3	48.86%			Dera Ismail Khan
Mardan	Mardan	1,632	2,744,898	1,681.4	55.79%	2.58% ▲		Mardan
Swabi	Swabi	1,543	1,894,600	1,228.0	58.48%	2.44% ▲		Mardan
Upper Chitral	Booni	8,392	195,528	23.3	73.83%	1.24% ▲		Malakand
Upper Dir	Dir	2,216	488,339	220.3	46.77%	2.64% ▲		Malakand
Lower Chitral	Chitral	6,458	320,407	49.6	66.10%	2.17% ▲		Malakand
Lower Dir	Timergara	1,583	1,650,183	1,042.4	57.36%	3.71% ▲		Malakand
Malakand	Batkhela	952	826,250	868.1	...	2.47% ▲		Malakand
Shangla	Alpuri	1,586	891,252	562.0	33.74%	2.96% ▲		Malakand
Swat	Saidu Sharif	1,362	1,557,030	1143.1	58.13%	3.24% ▲		Malakand
Upper Swat	Matta	3,975	1,130,354	284.3	41.47%	2.56%		Malakand
Bajaur	Khar	1,290	1,287,960	998.4	26.26%	3.25% ▲		Malakand
Buner	Daggar	1,865	1,016,869	545.1	43.75%	3.05% ▲		Malakand
Central Dir District	Wari	1,483	595,227	401.4	48.26%	...		Malakand

=== Punjab ===
Districts of Punjab with their names as of 2023. Colors correspond to divisions

Below you will find a list of all 41 districts in the province of Punjab, along with the division it belongs to, the area of the district, the population and population density of the district, the average annual population growth rate of each district (between 1998 and 2017), and a map showing its location. The districts are initially listed in alphabetical order, but they can be sorted in different ways by clicking the headers of the table.

List of the Districts by area, population, density, literacy rate etc.
District	Headquarter	Area (km^{2})	Population (2023)	Density (ppp/km^{2})	Literacy rate (2023)	Average Annual Population Growth Rate (1998 - 2017)	Map	Division
Attock	Attock	6,858	2,170,423	316.7	80.22%	2.08% ▲		Rawalpindi
Bahawalnagar	Bahawalnagar	8,878	3,550,342	399.6	67.01%	1.95% ▲		Bahawalpur
Bahawalpur	Bahawalpur	24,830	4,284,964	172.3	63.35%	2.18% ▲		Bahawalpur
Bhakkar	Bhakkar	8,153	1,957,470	240.5	65.68%	2.39% ▲		Sargodha
Chakwal	Chakwal	6,524	1,734,854	266.2	87.79%	1.71% ▲		Rawalpindi
Chiniot	Chiniot	2,643	1,563,024	591.3	65.05%	1.85% ▲		Faisalabad
Dera Ghazi Khan	Dera Ghazi Khan	11,922	3,393,705	285.8	56.78%	2.98% ▲		Dera Ghazi Khan
Faisalabad	Faisalabad	5,856	9,075,819	1,551.7	83.41%	1.98% ▲		Faisalabad
Gujranwala	Gujranwala	2,426	4,966,338	2,045.4	86.77%	2.06% ▲		Gujranwala
Gujrat	Gujrat	3,192	3,219,375	1,007.0	91.37%	1.57% ▲		Gujrat
Hafizabad	Hafizabad	2,367	1,319,909	557.0	75.77%	1.74% ▲		Gujrat
Jhang	Jhang	6,166	3,065,639	497.6	69.45%	2.03% ▲		Faisalabad
Jhelum	Jhelum	3,587	1,382,308	385.7	90.65%	1.41% ▲		Rawalpindi
Kasur	Kasur	3,995	4,084,286	1,021.4	72.85%	2.03% ▲		Lahore
Khanewal	Khanewal	4,349	3,364,077	774.3	70.97%	1.83% ▲		Multan
Khushab	Jauharabad	6,511	1,501,089	230.8	72.52%	1.84% ▲		Sargodha
Lahore	Lahore	1,772	13,004,135	7,336.6	89.62%	3.00% ▲		Lahore
Layyah	Layyah	6,289	2,102,386	334.5	71.83%	2.59% ▲		Dera Ghazi Khan
Lodhran	Lodhran	2,778	1,928,299	693.5	61.68%	1.97% ▲		Multan
Mandi Bahauddin	Mandi Bahauddin	2,673	1,829,486	683.1	80.27%	1.68% ▲		Gujrat
Mianwali	Mianwali	5,840	1,798,268	307.4	72.87%	2.01% ▲		Sargodha
Multan	Multan	3,720	5,362,305	1,441.1	71.41%	2.23% ▲		Multan
Muzaffargarh	Muzaffargarh	4,778	3,528,567	738.50	43.74%	...		Dera Ghazi Khan
Nankana Sahib	Nankana Sahib	2,216	1,634,871	737.0	73.12%	1.37% ▲		Lahore
Narowal	Narowal	2,337	1,950,954	834.3	85.28%	1.59% ▲		Gujranwala
Okara	Okara	4,377	3,515,490	802.2	70.25%	1.64% ▲		Sahiwal
Pakpattan	Pakpattan	2,724	2,136,170	785.3	67.13%	1.85% ▲		Sahiwal
Rahim Yar Khan	Rahim Yar Khan	11,880	5,564,703	468.2	57.94%	2.26% ▲		Bahawalpur
Rajanpur	Rajanpur	12,319	2,381,049	193.3	46.09%	3.16% ▲		Dera Ghazi Khan
Rawalpindi	Rawalpindi	4,547	5,745,964	1,868.79	93.22%	2.52% ▲		Rawalpindi
Sahiwal	Sahiwal	3,201	2,881,811	900.6	74.77%	1.64% ▲		Sahiwal
Sargodha	Sargodha	5,854	4,334,448	740.1	76.73%	1.73% ▲		Sargodha
Sheikhupura	Sheikhupura	3,744	4,049,418	1,080.3	78.88%	2.22% ▲		Lahore
Sialkot	Sialkot	3,016	4,499,394	1,492.5	88.37%	1.90% ▲		Gujranwala
Toba Tek Singh	Toba Tek Singh	3,252	2,524,044	776.2	81.38%	1.59% ▲		Faisalabad
Vehari	Vehari	4,364	3,430,421	787.7	69.10%	1.74% ▲		Multan
Talagang	Talagang	2,932	602,246	226.33	75.50	1.90% ▲		Rawalpindi
Murree	Murree	738	372,947	480	84.79	...		Rawalpindi
Taunsa	Taunsa	8,108	...	...	57.96	...		Dera Ghazi Khan
Kot Addu	Kot Addu	3,471	1,486,758	428.34	58.19	...		Dera Ghazi Khan
Wazirabad	Wazirabad	1,206	993,412	690	77.39	...		Gujrat

=== Sindh ===
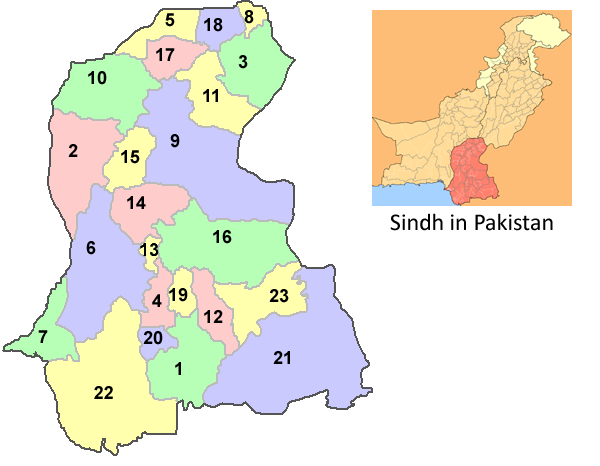
Districts of Sindh. Note: numbers don't match those of the table.

District	Headquarter	Area (km^{2})	Population (2023)	Density (/km^{2})	Literacy rate (2023)	Division
Badin	Badin	6,858	1,947,081	284.6	46.65%	Hyderabad
Dadu	Dadu	7,866	1,742,320	221.8	57.13%	Hyderabad
Ghotki	Mirpur Mathelo	6,083	1,772,609	291.3	51.38%	Sukkur
Hyderabad	Hyderabad	993	2,432,540	2,448.7	77.21%	Hyderabad
Jacobabad	Jacobabad	2,698	1,174,097	434.0	52.34%	Larkana
Jamshoro	Jamshoro	11,204	1,117,308	99.7	59.63%	Hyderabad
Karachi Central	North Nazimabad	69	3,822,325	55,838.8	93.55%	Karachi
Karachi East	Gulshan e Iqbal	139	3,921,742	28,220.1	90.07%	Karachi
Karachi South	Saddar Karachi	122	2,329,764	19,104.6	88.57%	Karachi
Karachi West	Orangi Town	370	2,679,380	7,238.1	77.43%	Karachi
Kashmore	Kandhkot	2,580	1,233,957	477.3	45.59%	Larkana
Keamari	Moriro Mirbahar	559	2,068,451	3,699.8	72.07%	Karachi
Khairpur	Khairpur	15,910	2,597,535	163.3	60.14%	Sukkur
Korangi	Korangi	108	3,128,971	28,968.8	89.86%	Karachi
Larkana	Larkana	1,948	1,784,453	915.8	65.58%	Larkana
Malir	Malir	2,160	2,432,248	1,126.8	63.14%	Karachi
Matiari	Matiari	1,417	849,383	599.0	55.88%	Hyderabad
Mirpur Khas	Mirpur Khas	2,925	1,681,386	574.7	55.37%	Mirpur Khas
Naushahro Feroze	Naushahro Feroze	2,945	1,777,082	603.2	67.15%	Shaheed Benazir Abad
Qambar Shahdadkot	Qambar	5,475	1,514,869	276.4	50.02%	Larkana
Sanghar	Sanghar	10,728	2,308,465	215.0	53.66%	Mirpur Khas
Shaheed Benazirabad	Nawabshah	4,502	1,845,102	409.5	60.86%	Shaheed Benazirabad
Shikarpur	Shikarpur	2,512	1,386,330	552.1	53.70%	Larkana
Sujawal	Sujawal	8,785	839,292	95.5	37.02%	Hyderabad
Sukkur	Sukkur	5,165	1,639,897	317.7	68.26%	Sukkur
Tando Allahyar	Tando Allahyar	1,554	922,012	592.8	49.80%	Hyderabad
Tando Muhammad Khan	Tando Muhammad Khan	1,423	726,119	509.1	44.02%	Hyderabad
Tharparkar	Mithi	19,637	1,778,407	90.6	46.39%	Mirpur Khas
Thatta	Thatta	8,570	1,083,191	126.8	36.88%	Hyderabad
Umerkot	Umerkot	5,608	1,159,831	207.2	38.69%	Mirpur Khas

N.B. All the figures require to be re-checked. Data entry error has occurred in Sindh Province.

== List of all districts by area, population, density, literacy rate etc ==
District	Headquarter	Area (km^{2})	Population (2023)	Density (people/km^{2}) (2023)	Literacy rate (2023)	Division	Province
Muzaffarabad	Muzaffarabad	1,642	...	394	...	Muzaffarabad	Azad Kashmir
Hattian Bala	Hattian Bala	854	...	270	...	Muzaffarabad	Azad Kashmir
Neelum	Athmuqam	3,621	...	53	...	Muzaffarabad	Azad Kashmir
Mirpur	Mirpur	1,010	...	452	...	Mirpur	Azad Kashmir
Bhimber	Bhimber	1,516	...	297	...	Mirpur	Azad Kashmir
Kotli	Kotli	1,862	...	416	...	Mirpur	Azad Kashmir
Poonch	Rawalakot	855	...	585	...	Poonch	Azad Kashmir
Bagh	Bagh	770	...	483	...	Poonch	Azad Kashmir
Haveli	Forward Kahuta	598	...	254	...	Poonch	Azad Kashmir
Sudhnati	Pallandari	569	...	523	...	Poonch	Azad Kashmir
Ghanche	Khaplu	6,400	...	...	...	Baltistan	Gilgit-Baltistan
Skardu	Skardu	15,000	...	...	...	Baltistan	Gilgit-Baltistan
Roundu	Dambudas	1,895	39,490	...	...	Baltistan	Gilgit-Baltistan
Kharmang	Tolti	7,909	...	...	...	Baltistan	Gilgit-Baltistan
Shigar	Shigar	8,500	...	...	...	Baltistan	Gilgit-Baltistan
Astore	Eidghah	8,657	...	...	...	Diamer	Gilgit-Baltistan
Diamer	Chilas	7,234	323,643	...	...	Diamer	Gilgit-Baltistan
Darel	Darel	1,657	...	...	...	Diamer	Gilgit-Baltistan
Tangir	Tangir	1,106	...	...	...	Diamer	Gilgit-Baltistan
Ghizer	Gahkuch	9,635	...	...	...	Gilgit	Gilgit-Baltistan
Gilgit	Gilgit	38,000	...	...	...	Gilgit	Gilgit-Baltistan
Hunza	Karimabad	17,145	...	...	...	Gilgit	Gilgit-Baltistan
Nagar	Nagarkhas	15,567	...	...	...	Gilgit	Gilgit-Baltistan
Gupis-Yasin District	Phander	...	...	...	...	Gilgit	Gilgit-Baltistan
Haripur	Haripur	1,725	1,174,783	681.3	74.88%	Hazara	Khyber Pakhtunkhwa
Battagram	Battagram	497	335,984	676.02	41.20%	Hazara	Khyber Pakhtunkhwa
Abbottabad	Abbottabad	1,967	1,419,072	721.6	77.34%	Hazara	Khyber Pakhtunkhwa
Allai	Allai Valley	804	218,149	676.02	41.20%	Hazara	Khyber Pakhtunkhwa
Lower Kohistan	Pattan	642	340,017	529.5	22.05%	Hazara	Khyber Pakhtunkhwa
Mansehra	Mansehra	4,125	1,797,177	435.6	63.79%	Hazara	Khyber Pakhtunkhwa
Torghar	Judba	454	200,445	441.6	29.74%	Hazara	Khyber Pakhtunkhwa
Upper Kohistan	Dasu	5,440	422,947	77.8	19.05%	Hazara	Khyber Pakhtunkhwa
Kolai Palas	Kolai	1,410	280,162	198.7	18.80%	Hazara	Khyber Pakhtunkhwa
Hangu	Hangu	1,097	528,902	482.3	43.15%	Kohat	Khyber Pakhtunkhwa
Kurram	Parachinar	3,380	785,434	232.4	35.22%	Kohat	Khyber Pakhtunkhwa
Karak	Karak	3,372	815,878	241.9	65.36%	Kohat	Khyber Pakhtunkhwa
Kohat	Kohat	2,991	1,234,661	412.9	58.55%	Kohat	Khyber Pakhtunkhwa
Orakzai	Kalaya	1,538	387,561	252.0	33.57%	Kohat	Khyber Pakhtunkhwa
Bajaur	Khar	1,290	1,287,960	998.4	26.26%	Malakand	Khyber Pakhtunkhwa
Buner	Daggar	1,865	1,016,869	545.1	43.75%	Malakand	Khyber Pakhtunkhwa
Lower Chitral	Chitral	6,458	320,407	49.6	66.10%	Malakand	Khyber Pakhtunkhwa
Lower Dir	Timergara	1,583	1,650,183	1,042.4	57.36%	Malakand	Khyber Pakhtunkhwa
Shangla	Alpuri	1,586	891,252	562.0	33.74%	Malakand	Khyber Pakhtunkhwa
Malakand	Batkhela	952	826,250	868.1	...	Malakand	Khyber Pakhtunkhwa
Swat	Saidu Sharif	5,337	2,687,384	503.6	48.13%	Malakand	Khyber Pakhtunkhwa
Upper Chitral	Booni	8,392	195,528	23.3	73.83%	Malakand	Khyber Pakhtunkhwa
Upper Dir	Dir	3,699	1,083,566	292.9	46.77%	Malakand	Khyber Pakhtunkhwa
Central Dir District	Wari	1,483	...	...	...	Malakand	Khyber Pakhtunkhwa
Charsadda	Charsadda	996	1,835,504	1,843.1	53.94%	Peshawar	Khyber Pakhtunkhwa
Khyber	Landi Kotal	2,576	1,146,267	445.0	38.45%	Peshawar	Khyber Pakhtunkhwa
Nowshera	Nowshera	1,748	1,740,705	995.8	56.78%	Peshawar	Khyber Pakhtunkhwa
Peshawar	Peshawar	1,518	4,758,762	3,135.6	53.28%	Peshawar	Khyber Pakhtunkhwa
Mohmand	Ghalanai	2,296	553,933	241.2	31.28%	Peshawar	Khyber Pakhtunkhwa
Upper South Waziristan	Spinkai	2,815	...	...	31.96%	Dera Ismail Khan	Khyber Pakhtunkhwa
Lower South Waziristan	Wana	3,805	...	...	31.96%	Dera Ismail Khan	Khyber Pakhtunkhwa
Tank	Tank	2,900	470,293	162.2	40.67%	Dera Ismail Khan	Khyber Pakhtunkhwa
Dera Ismail Khan	Dera Ismail Khan	9,334	1,829,811	196.1	46.58%	Dera Ismail Khan	Khyber Pakhtunkhwa
North Waziristan	Miranshah	4,707	693,332	147.3	32.82%	Bannu	Khyber Pakhtunkhwa
Bannu	Bannu	1,972	1,357,890	688.6	41.75%	Bannu	Khyber Pakhtunkhwa
Lakki Marwat	Lakki Marwat	3,296	1,040,856	315.8	48.47%	Bannu	Khyber Pakhtunkhwa
Swabi	Swabi	1,543	1,894,600	1,228.0	58.48%	Mardan	Khyber Pakhtunkhwa
Mardan	Mardan	1,632	2,744,898	1,681.4	55.79%	Mardan	Khyber Pakhtunkhwa
Jamshoro	Jamshoro	11,204	1,117,308	99.7	49.63%	Hyderabad	Sindh
Hyderabad	Hyderabad	993	2,432,540	2,448.7	67.21%	Hyderabad	Sindh
Badin	Badin	6,858	1,947,081	284.6	36.65%	Hyderabad	Sindh
Dadu	Dadu	7,866	1,742,320	221.8	47.13%	Hyderabad	Sindh
Matiari	Matiari	1,417	849,383	599.0	45.88%	Hyderabad	Sindh
Sujawal	Sujawal	8,785	839,292	95.5	27.02%	Hyderabad	Sindh
Tando Allahyar	Tando Allahyar	1,554	922,012	592.8	39.80%	Hyderabad	Sindh
Tando Muhammad Khan	Tando Muhammad Khan	1,423	726,119	509.1	34.02%	Hyderabad	Sindh
Thatta	Thatta	8,570	1,083,191	126.8	26.88%	Hyderabad	Sindh
Ghotki	Mirpur Mathelo	6,083	1,772,609	291.3	41.38%	Sukkur	Sindh
Khairpur	Khairpur	15,910	2,597,535	163.3	50.14%	Sukkur	Sindh
Sukkur	Sukkur	5,165	1,639,897	317.7	58.26%	Sukkur	Sindh
Karachi Central	North Nazimabad	69	3,822,325	55,396	83.55%	Karachi	Sindh
Karachi East	Gulshan e Iqbal	139	3,921,742	28,417	80.07%	Karachi	Sindh
Karachi South	Saddar Karachi	122	2,329,764	19,096.4	78.57%	Karachi	Sindh
Karachi West	Orangi Town	370	2,679,380	7,241.6	67.43%	Karachi	Sindh
Keamari	Moriro Mirbahar	559	2,068,451	3,700.3	62.07%	Karachi	Sindh
Korangi	Korangi	108	3,128,971	28,972	79.86%	Karachi	Sindh
Malir	Malir	2,160	2,432,248	1,126.8	63.14%	Karachi	Sindh
Larkana	Larkana	1,948	1,784,453	915.8	55.58%	Larkana	Sindh
Jacobabad	Jacobabad	2,698	1,174,097	434.0	42.34%	Larkana	Sindh
Kashmore	Kandhkot	2,580	1,233,957	477.3	35.59%	Larkana	Sindh
Qambar Shahdadkot	Qambar	5,475	1,514,869	276.4	40.02%	Larkana	Sindh
Shikarpur	Shikarpur	2,512	1,386,330	552.1	43.70%	Larkana	Sindh
Mirpur Khas	Mirpur Khas	2,925	1,681,386	574.7	45.37%	Mirpur Khas	Sindh
Umerkot	Umerkot	5,608	1,159,831	207.2	38.69%	Mirpur Khas	Sindh
Tharparkar	Mithi	19,637	1,778,407	90.6	36.39%	Mirpur Khas	Sindh
Sanghar	Sanghar	10,728	2,308,465	215.0	43.66%	Mirpur Khas	Sindh
Shaheed Benazirabad	Nawabshah	4,502	1,845,102	409.5	50.86%	Shaheed Benazirabad	Sindh
Naushahro Feroze	Naushahro Feroze	2,945	1,777,082	603.2	57.15%	Shaheed Benazirabad	Sindh
Hub	Hub	6,716	382,885	57	36.47%	Khuzdar	Balochistan
Surab	Surab	762	279,038	366.5	37.44%	Khuzdar	Balochistan
Lasbela	Uthal	15,153	680,977	44.9	36.47%	Khuzdar	Balochistan
Mastung	Mastung	3,308	313,271	94.7	45.97%	Khuzdar	Balochistan
Khuzdar	Khuzdar	35,380	997,214	28.2	38.59%	Khuzdar	Balochistan
Kalat	Kalat	7,654	271,560	35.5	39.70%	Khuzdar	Balochistan
Awaran	Awaran	29,510	178,958	6.1	36.34%	Khuzdar	Balochistan
Barkhan	Barkhan	3,514	210,249	59.8	33.62%	Loralai	Balochistan
Duki	Duki	4,233	205,044	48.4	44.18%	Loralai	Balochistan
Musakhel	Musa Khel Bazar	5,728	182,275	31.8	36.60%	Loralai	Balochistan
Loralai	Loralai	3,785	272,432	72.0	43.16%	Loralai	Balochistan
Gwadar	Gwadar	12,637	305,160	24.2	50.30%	Makran	Balochistan
Kech	Turbat	22,539	1,060,931	47.0	49.65%	Makran	Balochistan
Panjgur	Panjgur	16,891	509,781	30.2	42.07%	Makran	Balochistan
Jafarabad	Dera Allahyar	1,643	594,558	361.9	35.53 %	Nasirabad	Balochistan
Jhal Magsi	Gandava	3,615	203,368	56.2	30.14%	Nasirabad	Balochistan
Kachhi	Dhadar	5,682	442,674	77.9	30.20%	Nasirabad	Balochistan
Nasirabad	Dera Murad Jamali	3,387	563,315	166.1	28.96%	Nasirabad	Balochistan
Sohbatpur	Sohbatpur	802	240,106	299.6	41.02%	Nasirabad	Balochistan
Usta Muhammad	Usta Muhammad	953	...	280	35.53%	Nasirabad	Balochistan
Dera Bugti	Dera Bugti	10,160	355,274	35.0	24.07%	Sibi	Balochistan
Kohlu	Kohlu	7,610	260,220	34.2	28.53%	Sibi	Balochistan
Sibi	Sibi	7,121	224,148	31.5	47.41%	Sibi	Balochistan
Harnai	Harnai	2,492	127,571	51.2	39.83%	Sibi	Balochistan
Ziarat	Ziarat	3,301	189,535	57.4	43.37%	Sibi	Balochistan
Chaman	Chaman	1,341	466,218	347.7	39.97%	Quetta	Balochistan
Pishin	Pishin	6,218	835,482	134.6	51.07%	Quetta	Balochistan
Quetta	Quetta	3,447	2,595,492	754.3	56.29%	Quetta	Balochistan
Qila Abdullah	Jungle Pir Alizai	3,553	361,971	101.9	36.40%	Quetta	Balochistan
Qilla Saifullah	Qilla Saifullah	6,831	380,200	55.7	32.96%	Zhob	Balochistan
Sherani	Sherani	4,310	191,687	44.5	23.86%	Zhob	Balochistan
Zhob	Zhob	15,987	355,692	22.2	36.62%	Zhob	Balochistan
Kharan	Kharan	14,958	260,352	17.4	41.07%	Rakhshan	Balochistan
Nushki	Nushki	5,797	207,834	35.9	57.12%	Rakhshan	Balochistan
Washuk	Washuk	33,093	302,623	9.1	21.58%	Rakhshan	Balochistan
Chagai	Dalbandin	44,748	269,192	6.0	33.15%	Rakhshan	Balochistan
Rawalpindi	Rawalpindi	4,547	5,745,964	1,868.79	83.06%	Rawalpindi	Punjab
Jhelum	Jhelum	3,587	1,382,308	385.7	80.65%	Rawalpindi	Punjab
Attock	Attock	6,858	2,170,423	316.7	70.22%	Rawalpindi	Punjab
Murree	Murree	738	372,947	480	86.01%	Rawalpindi	Punjab
Chakwal	Chakwal	6,524	1,734,854	266.2	77.79%	Rawalpindi	Punjab
Talagang	Talagang	2,932	...	140	...	Rawalpindi	Punjab
Taunsa	Taunsa	2,769	...	240	...	Dera Ghazi Khan	Punjab
Kot Addu	Kot Addu	3,471	...	390	...	Dera Ghazi Khan	Punjab
Layyah	Layyah	6,289	2,102,386	334.5	61.83%	Dera Ghazi Khan	Punjab
Dera Ghazi Khan	Dera Ghazi Khan	11,922	3,393,705	285.8	46.78	Dera Ghazi Khan	Punjab
Muzaffargarh	Muzaffargarh	8,249	5,015,325	607.5	47.99%	Dera Ghazi Khan	Punjab
Rajanpur	Rajanpur	12,319	2,381,049	193.3	36.09%	Dera Ghazi Khan	Punjab
Toba Tek Singh	Toba Tek Singh	3,252	2,524,044	776.2	71.38%	Faisalabad	Punjab
Jhang	Jhang	6,166	3,065,639	499.1	59.45%	Faisalabad	Punjab
Chiniot	Chiniot	2,643	1,563,024	591.3	55.05%	Faisalabad	Punjab
Faisalabad	Faisalabad	5,856	9,075,819	1,551.7	73.41%	Faisalabad	Punjab
Lahore	Lahore	1,772	13,004,135	7,336.6	79.62%	Lahore	Punjab
Kasur	Kasur	3,995	4,084,286	1,022.3	62.85%	Lahore	Punjab
Nankana Sahib	Nankana Sahib	2,216	1,634,871	737.0	63.12%	Lahore	Punjab
Sheikhupura	Sheikhupura	3,744	4,049,418	1,080.3	68.88%	Lahore	Punjab
Sialkot	Sialkot	3,016	4,499,394	1,492.5	78.37%	Gujranwala	Punjab
Gujranwala	Gujranwala	2,426	4,966,338	2,045.4	76.77%	Gujranwala	Punjab
Narowal	Narowal	2,337	1,950,954	834.3	75.28%	Gujranwala	Punjab
Okara	Okara	4,377	3,515,490	802.2	60.25%	Sahiwal	Punjab
Pakpattan	Pakpattan	2,724	2,136,170	785.3	57.13%	Sahiwal	Punjab
Sahiwal	Sahiwal	3,201	2,881,811	900.6	64.77%	Sahiwal	Punjab
Rahim Yar Khan	Rahim Yar Khan	11,880	5,564,703	468.2	47.94%	Bahawalpur	Punjab
Bahawalnagar	Bahawalnagar	8,878	3,550,342	399.6	57.01%	Bahawalpur	Punjab
Bahawalpur	Bahawalpur	24,830	4,284,964	172.3	53.35%	Bahawalpur	Punjab
Sargodha	Sargodha	5,854	4,334,448	740.1	66.73%	Sargodha	Punjab
Khushab	Jauharabad	6,511	1,501,089	230.8	62.52%	Sargodha	Punjab
Bhakkar	Bhakkar	8,153	1,957,470	240.5	55.68%	Sargodha	Punjab
Mianwali	Mianwali	5,840	1,798,268	307.4	62.87%	Sargodha	Punjab
Khanewal	Khanewal	4,349	3,364,077	773.5	60.97%	Multan	Punjab
Vehari	Vehari	4,364	3,430,421	787.7	59.10%	Multan	Punjab
Multan	Multan	3,720	5,362,305	1,441.1	61.41%	Multan	Punjab
Lodhran	Lodhran	2,778	1,928,299	693.5	51.68%	Multan	Punjab
Mandi Bahauddin	Mandi Bahauddin	2,673	1,829,486	683.1	70.27%	Gujrat	Punjab
Gujrat	Gujrat	3,192	3,219,375	1,007.0	81.37%	Gujrat	Punjab
Hafizabad	Hafizabad	2,367	1,319,909	557.0	65.77%	Gujrat	Punjab
Wazirabad	Wazirabad	1,206	993,412	690	...	Gujrat	Punjab
Islamabad Capital Territory	Islamabad	906	2,363,863	2,609.1	83.97%	Islamabad Capital Territory	Islamabad Capital Territory

== List of all districts by population over the years ==
List of districts by population over the years
District	Population (2023)	Population (2017)	Population (1998)	Population (1981)	Population (1972)	Population (1961)	Population (1951)
Muzaffarabad	...	650,370	453,957	...	...	...	...
Hattian Bala	...	230,529	166,064	...	...	...	...
Neelum	...	191,251	125,712	...	...	...	...
Mirpur	...	456,200	333,482	...	...	...	...
Bhimber	...	420,624	301,633	...	...	...	...
Kotli	...	774,194	563,134	...	...	...	...
Poonch	...	500,571	411,035	...	...	...	...
Bagh	...	371,919	281,721	...	...	...	...
Haveli	...	152,124	111,694	...	...	...	...
Sudhnati	...	297,584	224,091	...	...	...	...
Ghanche	...	160,000	88,366	...	...	...	...
Skardu	...	...	214,848	...	...	...	...
Roundu	39,490	...	...	...	...	...	...
Astore	...	...	71,666	...	...	...	...
Diamer	323,643	...	131,925	...	...	...	...
Darel	...	...	...	...	...	...	...
Tangir	...	...	...	...	...	...	...
Ghizer	...	...	120,218	...	...	...	...
Gilgit	...	330,000	243,324	...	...	...	...
Hunza	...	243,324	80,355	...	...	...	...
Kharmang	...	...	188,000	...	...	...	...
Shigar	...	...	109,000	...	...	...	...
Nagar	87,500	...	89,420	...	...	...	...
Gupis-Yasin District	...	...	...	...	...	...	...
Abbottabad	1,419,072	1,332,912	880,666	647,635	524,826	354,452	318,775
Allai	218,149	180,414	...	...	...	...	...
Bajaur	1,287,960	1,093,684	595,227	289,206	364,050	280,200	320,985
Bannu	1,357,890	1,211,006	695,260	485,240	392,468	...	...
Battagram	335,984	296,198	307,278	339,119	174,009	94,357	...
Buner	1,016,869	897,319	506,048	265,517	187,984	123,217	109,147
Charsadda	1,835,504	1,616,198	1,022,364	630,811	513,193	364,088	282,618
Central Dir District	...	595,227	...	...	...	...	...
Dera Ismail Khan	1,829,811	1,695,688	891,985	550,256	430,051	...	...
Hangu	528,902	518,798	314,529	182,474	125,721	87,163	55,167
Haripur	1,174,783	1,003,031	692,228	479,031	417,561	273,507	252,168
Karak	815,878	706,299	430,796	249,681	191,204	121,199	99,908
Khyber	1,146,267	986,973	546,730	284,256	378,032	301,319	216,622
Kohat	1,234,661	1,112,452	651,100	383,862	308,507	209,817	...
Kolai Palas	280,162	275,461	165,613	123,685	...	...	...
Kurram	785,434	619,553	430,796	249,681	191,204	121,199	99,908
Lakki Marwat	1,040,856	902,541	...	...	...	...	...
Lower Chitral	320,407	278,122	184,874	121,641	87,617	54,844	...
Lower Dir	1,650,183	1,435,917	717,649	404,844	277,481	...	...
Lower Kohistan	340,017	202,913	122,211	161,428	...	...	...
Malakand	826,250	720,295	452,291	257,797	185,872	133,627	89,699
Mansehra	1,797,177	1,556,460	978,157	686,308	552,842	373,975	260,631
Mardan	2,744,898	2,373,061	1,460,100	881,465	696,622	481,297	357,455
Mohmand	553,933	466,984	334,453	163,933	382,922	294,215	129,300
North Waziristan	693,332	543,254	361,246	238,910	250,663	159,470	128,235
Nowshera	1,740,705	1,518,540	874,373	537,638	410,718	276,937	222,527
Orakzai	387,561	254,356	225,441	358,751	283,557	209,616	...
Peshawar	4,758,762	4,333,770	2,080,692	1,150,364	867,144	...	...
Shangla	891,252	757,810	434,563	251,546	179,813	121,528	107,731
Upper South Waziristan	...	367,364	...	...	...	...	...
Lower South Waziristan	...	307,851	...	...	...	...	...
Swabi	1,894,600	1,624,616	1,026,804	625,035	507,631	332,543	272,279
Swat	2,687,384	2,309,570	1,257,602	715,938	520,614	344,859	283,720
Tank	470,293	428,274	265,432	171,245	120,005	...	...
Torghar	200,445	171,395	174,682	83,927	195,580	151,718	142,599
Upper Chitral	195,528	169,240	133,815	86,919	71,383	58,213	...
Upper Dir	1,083,566	946,421	575,858	362,565	251,045	...	...
Upper Kohistan	422,947	306,337	184,746	180,124	121,529	...	...
Badin	1,947,081	1,804,958	1,106,272	813,335	640,718	353,232	273,398
Dadu	1,742,320	1,550,390	1,106,717	705,669	556,669	342,939	295,402
Ghotki	1,772,609	1,648,708	968,797	558,058	401,318	221,243	179,186
Hyderabad	2,432,540	2,199,928	1,494,866	1,005,460	814,060	537,000	319,232
Jacobabad	1,174,097	1,007,009	727,190	586,234	402,114	232,893	188,718
Jamshoro	1,117,308	993,908	582,094	375,942	254,318	144,228	123,561
Karachi Central	3,822,325	2,971,382	2,289,071	...	...	...	...
Karachi East	3,921,742	2,875,315	1,447,529	...	...	...	...
Karachi South	2,329,764	1,769,230	1,468,579	...	...	...	...
Karachi West	2,679,380	3,907,065	2,127,765	...	...	...	...
Kashmore	1,233,957	1,090,336	677,120	...	...	...	...
Keamari	2,068,451	1,829,837	...	...	...	...	...
Khairpur	2,597,535	2,405,190	1,547,751	981,190	724,935	500,258	347,068
Korangi	3,128,971	2,577,556	1,608,609	...	...	...	...
Larkana	1,784,453	1,521,786	1,001,608	...	...	...	...
Malir	2,432,248	1,924,346	914,765	...	...	...	...
Matiari	849,383	770,040	494,244	438,319	336,367	148,995	124,948
Mirpur Khas	1,681,386	1,504,440	1,006,329	...	...	...	...
Naushahro Feroze	1,777,082	1,612,047	1,087,571	829,051	685,829	369,161	267,638
Qambar Shahdadkot	1,514,869	1,338,035	924,294	566,574	460,722	299,259	258,327
Sanghar	2,308,465	2,049,873	1,319,881	893,047	674,210	417,440	311,553
Shaheed Benazirabad	1,845,102	1,613,506	1,102,584	838,350	678,982	330,730	228,016
Shikarpur	1,386,330	1,233,760	880,438	596,409	530,551	314,780	306,007
Sujawal	839,292	779,062	513,702	...	...	...	...
Sukkur	1,639,897	1,488,372	931,387	575,962	460,649	277,356	222,848
Tando Allahyar	922,012	838,527	493,526	329,370	256,994	140,259	106,267
Tando Muhammad Khan	726,119	677,098	438,624	...	...	...	...
Tharparkar	1,778,407	1,647,036	914,291	540,985	359,357	290,402	249,280
Thatta	1,083,191	982,138	599,492	...	...	...	...
Umerkot	1,159,831	1,073,469	664,797	...	...	...	...
Awaran	178,958	121,821	118,173	110,353	...	...	...
Barkhan	210,249	171,025	103,545	...	...	...	...
Chagai	269,192	226,517	104,534	...	...	...	...
Chaman	466,218	434,561	151,854	68,848	47,692	26,087	...
Dera Bugti	355,274	313,110	181,310	...	...	...	...
Duki	205,044	152,977	115,976	...	...	...	...
Gwadar	305,160	262,253	185,498	...	...	...	...
Harnai	127,571	97,052	76,652	...	...	...	...
Hub	382,885	339,640	163,194	...	...	...	...
Jafarabad	594,558	513,972	291,290	...	...	...	...
Jhal Magsi	203,368	148,900	109,941	...	...	...	...
Kachhi	442,674	309,932	255,480	...	...	...	...
Kalat	271,560	412,058	237,834	...	...	...	...
Kech	1,060,931	907,182	413,204	...	...	...	...
Kharan	260,352	162,766	96,900	...	...	...	...
Khuzdar	997,214	798,896	417,466	...	...	...	...
Kohlu	260,220	213,933	99,846	...	...	...	...
Lasbela	680,977	576,271	312,695	...	...	...	...
Loralai	272,432	244,446	134,171	97,887	41,615	23,293	...
Mastung	313,271	265,676	150,039	...	...	...	...
Musakhel	182,275	167,243	134,056	...	...	...	...
Nasirabad	563,315	487,847	245,894	...	...	...	...
Nushki	207,834	178,947	98,030	...	...	...	...
Panjgur	509,781	315,353	234,051	...	...	...	...
Pishin	835,482	736,903	367,183	202,256	131,923	58,957	...
Quetta	2,595,492	2,269,473	774,547	...	...	...	...
Qila Abdullah	361,971	323,793	218,415	107,493	69,539	40,286	...
Qilla Saifullah	380,200	342,932	193,553	148,362	72,086	37,577	...
Sherani	191,687	152,952	81,684	78,625	25,384	10,354	...
Sibi	224,148	179,751	136,322	...	...	...	...
Sohbatpur	240,106	200,426	141,527	...	...	...	...
Surab	279,038	200,857	93,401	...	...	...	...
Washuk	302,623	175,712	110,009	...	...	...	...
Zhob	355,692	310,354	193,458	134,660	74,519	39,755	...
Ziarat	189,535	160,095	80,748	63,179	37,688	15,853	...
Usta Muhammad	...	263,202	...	...	...	...	...
Attock	2,170,423	1,886,378	1,274,935	876,667	748,890	532,845	486,043
Bahawalnagar	3,550,342	2,975,656	2,061,447	1,373,747	1,073,891	822,827	630,430
Bahawalpur	4,284,964	3,669,176	2,433,091	1,453,438	1,071,026	735,524	527,837
Bhakkar	1,957,470	1,647,852	1,051,456	665,884	500,498	332,882	233,733
Chakwal	1,734,854	1,495,463	...	...	...	...	...
Chiniot	1,563,024	1,368,659	965,124	694,080	570,775	396,948	329,615
Dera Ghazi Khan	3,393,705	2,872,631	1,643,118	943,663	686,057	472,600	380,393
Faisalabad	9,075,819	7,882,444	5,429,547	3,561,909	3,163,756	1,990,297	1,548,689
Gujranwala	4,966,338	4,180,670	2,112,474	1,223,379	874,948	490,678	360,982
Gujrat	3,219,375	2,756,289	2,048,008	1,408,585	1,177,345	835,045	742,892
Hafizabad	1,319,909	1,156,954	832,980	567,572	444,187	291,778	251,557
Jhang	3,065,639	2,742,633	1,869,421	1,276,864	983,818	668,540	534,046
Jhelum	1,382,308	1,222,403	...	...	...	...	...
Kasur	4,084,286	3,454,881	2,375,875	1,528,002	1,186,386	853,877	760,304
Khanewal	3,364,077	2,920,233	2,068,490	1,369,766	1,067,993	774,701	635,482
Khushab	1,501,089	1,280,372	905,711	641,366	543,314	360,395	268,118
Lahore	13,004,135	11,119,985	6,318,745	3,544,942	2,587,621	1,625,810	1,134,757
Layyah	2,102,386	1,823,995	1,120,951	666,517	495,537	273,224	162,202
Lodhran	1,928,299	1,699,693	1,171,800	739,912	558,793	363,563	289,052
Mandi Bahauddin	1,829,486	1,594,039	1,160,552	846,114	721,833	490,967	414,850
Mianwali	1,798,268	1,542,601	1,056,620	711,529	595,134	413,851	315,816
Multan	5,362,305	4,746,166	3,116,851	1,970,075	1,506,223	983,815	725,131
Muzaffargarh	5,015,325	4,328,549	1,827,465	1,048,243	756,221	532,015	446,038
Nankana Sahib	1,634,871	1,354,986	1,044,865	...	...	...	...
Narowal	1,950,954	1,707,575	1,265,097	908,977	834,501	550,425	512,475
Okara	3,515,490	3,040,826	2,232,992	1,487,261	1,123,812	827,528	730,472
Pakpattan	2,136,170	1,824,228	1,286,680	843,623	615,742	440,091	380,678
Rahim Yar Khan	5,564,703	4,807,762	3,141,053	1,841,451	1,398,879	1,015,715	664,234
Rajanpur	2,381,049	1,996,039	1,103,618	638,921	456,391	304,020	247,136
Rawalpindi	5,745,964	5,402,380	3,363,911	...	...	...	...
Sahiwal	2,881,811	2,513,011	1,843,194	1,281,526	944,656	743,614	603,782
Sargodha	4,334,448	3,696,212	2,665,979	1,911,849	1,557,641	1,107,226	893,269
Sheikhupura	4,049,418	3,460,004	2,276,164	...	...	...	...
Sialkot	4,499,394	3,894,938	2,723,481	1,802,505	1,509,424	1,045,958	961,721
Toba Tek Singh	2,524,044	2,191,495	1,621,593	1,134,572	1,084,442	706,800	615,582
Vehari	3,430,421	2,902,081	2,090,416	1,328,808	1,027,319	703,197	558,536
Talagang	602,246	527,756	401,607	...	...	...	...
Murree	372,947	352,329	...	...	...	...	...
Taunsa	1,045,460	677,785	...	...	...	...	...
Kot Addu	...	1,347,501	808,438	449,493	313,137	184,639	143,009
Wazirabad	993,412	830,396	644,233	442,493	370,310	254,715	217,197
Islamabad Capital Territory	2,363,863	2,006,572	805,235	340,286	237,549	...	...

== See also ==
- Administrative units of Pakistan
- City Districts of Pakistan
- List of districts of Pakistan by types of households
- Divisions of Pakistan
- Tehsils of Pakistan
  - Tehsils of Punjab, Pakistan
  - Tehsils of Khyber Pakhtunkhwa, Pakistan
  - Tehsils of Balochistan, Pakistan
  - Tehsils of Sindh, Pakistan
  - Tehsils of Azad Kashmir
  - Tehsils of Gilgit-Baltistan
- District
  - Districts of Khyber Pakhtunkhwa, Pakistan
  - Districts of Punjab, Pakistan
  - Districts of Balochistan, Pakistan
  - Districts of Sindh, Pakistan
  - Districts of Azad Kashmir
  - Districts of Gilgit-Baltistan
- List of cities in Pakistan by population
- Union councils of Pakistan
