= Douan =

Human settlement in Pakistan

Coordinates: 35°32′30″N 72°42′13″E

Douan, also known as Doyan, is a village in Astore District of Gilgit–Baltistan, Pakistan. It is located in Astore Valley, at the base of the Himalayas. Doyan is a hill station with a small natural lake at a nearby mountain's top. The road to the village famously has 24 uphill turns. Doyan is named after Dooday Family of Tangir District(citation)required as this pasture was bestowed to them by Maharaja of Kashmir. Doyan was bordering estate of Dogra state of Kashmir with Diamer. Doyan served as base camp for liberation fighters against Dogra state as Molana Abdul Manan led them to Zojila pass with help of local Numberdar Haji Abdul Rahim who provided them logistic support.

The village is divided into Ajini (upper) Doyan and Kharini (lower) Doyan. The village is situated on sulphur rocks and thus unstable due to continuous earth quakes. Doyan is famous for trophy hunting of famous Astore Markhor. Its water source is located at base camp of Nanga Parbat which was channelled with help IFAD and local community.

Doyan has remained political strong hold of conservative political party JI. Molvi Abdul Manan and former Law Minister Mushtaq Ahmed Advocate of Doyan remained provincial Ameer of JI for consecutive terms.

All the basic facilities are available in the village. People are cultivating potatoes, wheat and corn. The village is rich for pastures and forest.

Majority of village population has migrated from Doyan and is settled in Gilgit amidst difficult out reach, earth quake hazards and water crises.

Area notables of Doyan village include Haji Abdul Rahim (Numberdar), Ismail Khan (Former Political Agent / Deputy Commissioner), Molana Abdul Manan (Former JI Ameer), Mushtaq Ahmed (Former Law Minister), Aftab Ismail (Former Planning Minister), Abdul Qayyum (Former Head of Provincial Forest Department) and Pakistan Army Captain Taimoor Ali Khan who got martyrdom at LOC.
