= List of tehsils of Gilgit-Baltistan =

Administrative subdivisions of Gilgit-Baltistan in Pakistan

In Pakistan, a tehsil is an administrative sub-division of a district, sub-divided into union councils. Following is a list of 34 tehsils of Gilgit-Baltistan in northern Pakistan as of 2023.

== List of the Tehsils ==
Tehsil	Districts	Division
Daghoni Tehsil	Ghanche District	Baltistan Division
Khaplu Tehsil	Ghanche District	Baltistan Division
Mashabrum Tehsil	Ghanche District	Baltistan Division
Chorbat Tehsil	Ghanche District	Baltistan Division
Keris Tehsil	Ghanche District	Baltistan Division
Haldi Tehsil (Ghowari Tehsil)	Ghanche District	Baltistan Division
Shigar Tehsil	Shigar District	Baltistan Division
Gulabpur Tehsil	Shigar District	Baltistan Division
Gultari Tehsil	Skardu District	Baltistan Division
Roundu Tehsil	Skardu District	Baltistan Division
Skardu Tehsil	Skardu District	Baltistan Division
Gamba Tehsil	Skardu District	Baltistan Division
Kharmang Tehsil	Kharmang District	Baltistan Division
Astore Tehsil	Astore District	Diamer Division
Shounter Tehsil	Astore District	Diamer Division
Babusar Tehsil	Diamir District	Diamer Division
Darel Tehsil	Diamir District	Diamer Division
Tangir Tehsil	Diamir District	Diamer Division
Chilas Tehsil	Diamir District	Diamer Division
Goharabad Tehsil	Diamir District	Diamer Division
Punial Tehsil	Ghizer District	Gilgit Division
Gupis Tehsil	Ghizer District	Gilgit Division
Yasin Tehsil	Ghizer District	Gilgit Division
Phander Tehsil	Ghizer District	Gilgit Division
Ishkoman Tehsil	Ghizer District	Gilgit Division
Danyor Tehsil	Gilgit District	Gilgit Division
Gilgit Tehsil	Gilgit District	Gilgit Division
Jaglot Tehsil	Gilgit District	Gilgit Division
Aliabad Tehsil	Hunza District	Gilgit Division
Gojal Tehsil	Hunza District	Gilgit Division
Shinaki Tehsil	Hunza District	Gilgit Division
Nagar-I Tehsil	Nagar District	Gilgit Division
Sikandarabad Nagar-II Tehsil	Nagar District	Gilgit Division
Chalt Tehsil	Nagar District	Gilgit Division

The tehsil map of Gilgit-Baltistan, circa 2008

== See also ==
- List of tehsils in Pakistan
- Districts of Pakistan
  - Districts of Khyber Pakhtunkhwa, Pakistan
  - Districts of Punjab, Pakistan
  - Districts of Balochistan, Pakistan
  - Districts of Sindh, Pakistan
  - Districts of Azad Kashmir
  - Districts of Gilgit-Baltistan
- Divisions of Pakistan
  - Divisions of Balochistan
  - Divisions of Khyber Pakhtunkhwa
  - Divisions of Punjab
  - Divisions of Sindh
  - Divisions of Azad Kashmir
  - Divisions of Gilgit-Baltistan
