= Sohbatpur =

City in Balochistan, Pakistan

Sohbatpur صحبت پور
- City
- Location of Sohbatpur Sohbatpur (Pakistan)
- Coordinates: 28°31′06″N 68°32′38″E
- Country: Pakistan
- Province: Balochistan
- District: Sohbatpur
- Division: Nasirabad Division
- Founder: Sohbat Khan Gola

Government
  - Type: Municipal Committee
  - Chairman: Vacant
  - Vice-Chairman: Vacant
  - MPA: Saleem Ahmed Khosa

Population (2023)
  - Total: 14,728
- Time zone: UTC+5 (PST)
- Calling code: 0838

Sohbatpur (Urdu: صحبت پور) or Sohbat Pur is a city in the Pakistani province of Balochistan. It is the headquarters of Sohbatpur District. Until 2012, the city was a Tehsil of Jaffarabad District. The Sohbatpur district was created by then Caretaker Prime Minister of Pakistan Mir Hazar Khan Khosa in May 2013.

== Demographics ==
=== Population ===
Historical population
| Year | Pop. | ±% p.a. |
|---|---|---|
| 1998 | 8,206 | — |
| 2017 | 12,867 | +2.40% |
| 2023 | 14,728 | +2.28% |

As of the 2023 census, Sohbatpur town had a population of 14,728.

== Transportation ==
Sukkur-Quetta Highway N-65

Located approximately 24 km from Sohbatpur via Dera Allah Yar, this highway connects the region with Quetta, Sibi, and Sukkur.

Dera Allah Yar–Kashmore Road

An important regional route connecting Sohbatpur with Dera Allah Yar in Balochistan and Kashmore in the neighbouring province of Sindh.
