= Jaffarabad, Gilgit district =

Jaffarabad جعفر آباد
- Village
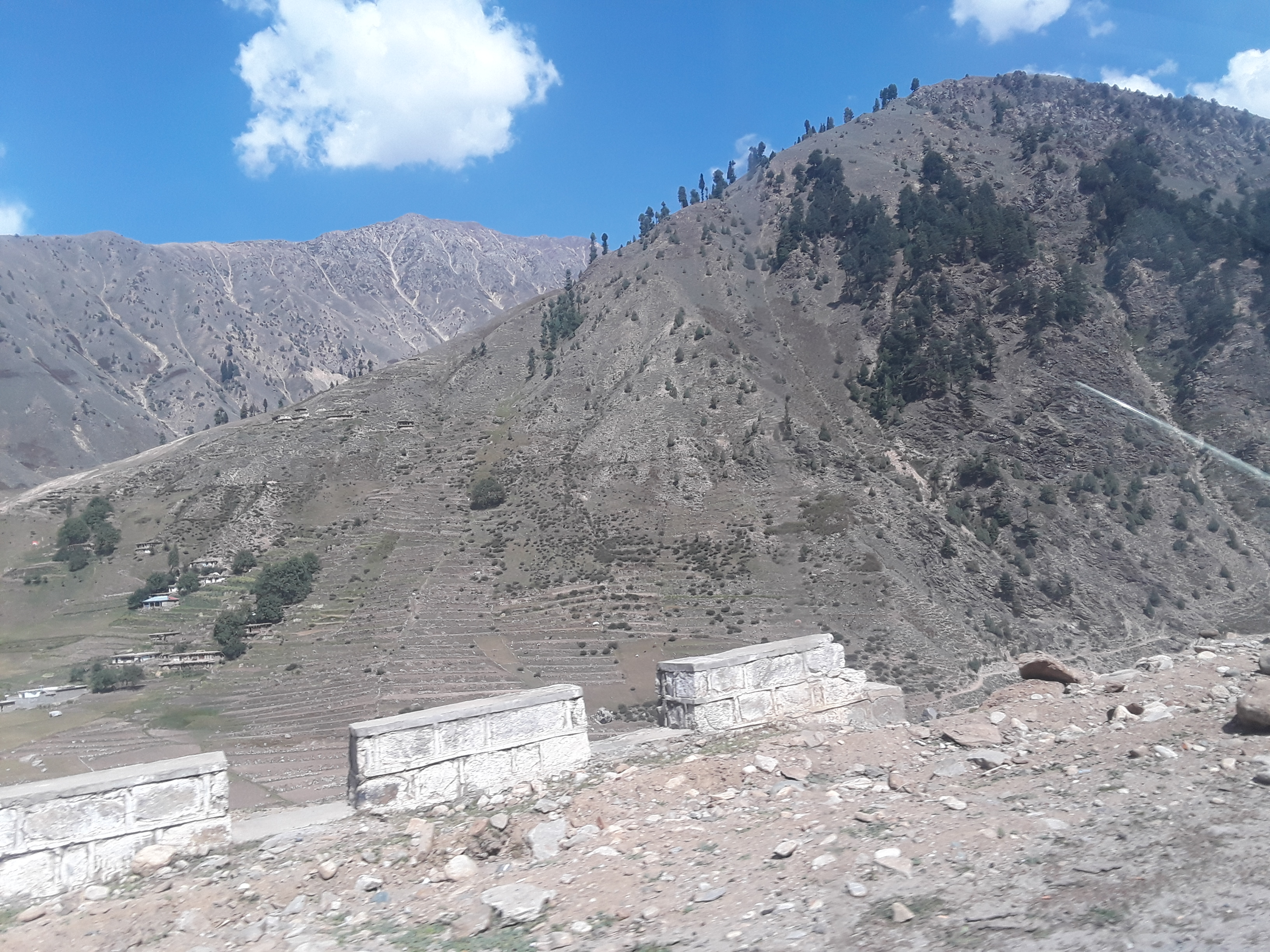
- Jaffarabad

- Location within Gilgit Baltistan
- Coordinates: 36°14′8″N 74°24′28″E
- Country: Pakistan
- Territories of Pakistan: Gilgit-Baltistan
- District: Gilgit
- Time zone: UTC+05:00 (PKT)

Jaffarabad is a village located in Gilgit District of Gilgit-Baltistan, in Pakistan. Gilgit city is 36 km (23 mi) away from Jaffarabad.
