= Allium gilgiticum =

Gilgit onion

Scientific classification
- Kingdom: Plantae
- Clade: Tracheophytes
- Clade: Angiosperms
- Clade: Monocots
- Order: Asparagales
- Family: Amaryllidaceae
- Subfamily: Allioideae
- Genus: Allium
- Subgenus: A. subg. Butomissa
- Species: A. gilgiticum

Binomial name
- Allium gilgiticum F.T. Wang & Tang

Species of plant

Allium gilgiticum is an Asian species of onion, a rare and quite possibly extinct species. It is known only from the type collection, gathered in the 1930s in Gilgit District in Pakistan, high in the Himalayas, part of the Kashmir region long disputed with India. The plant is about 50 cm tall, with a hemispheric umbel of purple flowers.
