= Sultanabad, Gilgit-Baltistan =

Village in Gilgit-Baltistan, Pakistan

Sultanabad
- Village
- Location in Pakistan Sultanabad (Pakistan)
- Coordinates: 35.9553361°N 74.3820002°E
- Country: Pakistan
- Administrative unit: Gilgit-Baltistan
- District: Gilgit District
- Time zone: UTC+5:00 (PKT)

Sultanabad, also known as Sultan Abad, is a village in Gilgit-Baltistan, Pakistan. It is located in Gilgit District.

== Economy, infrastructure and demographics ==
Farming is a key sector of Sultanabad's economy with potato, maize and wheat being some of the crops. The other important industry is tourism.

Karakoram Highway passes through Sultanabad.

Sultanabad has a population just above a thousand. The village was founded by Gujars from Naltar.
