= Gudai =

- Village
- Location in Gilgit-Baltistan, Pakistan Gudai (Pakistan)
- Coordinates: 35°11′31″N 74°57′2″E
- Country: Pakistan
- Administrative territory: Gilgit-Baltistan
- District: Astore District
- Union Council: Gudai
- Elevation: 2,600 m (8,500 ft)

Population (estimate)
  - Total: 1,500–2,000
- Time zone: UTC+5 (PKT)
- Calling code: 05817
- Website: Gilgit-Baltistan Official Website

Gudai is a village located in the Astore District of Gilgit-Baltistan, Pakistan. It serves as the headquarters of the Gudai Union Council. The nearest villages include Shekong, Khuma, Karbay, Bomray, Booban, and Dass Kharym.

The village was once the administrative headquarters during the Dogra Raj. A rest house built in the 18th century is located in Gudai and is now maintained by the Government of Pakistan.

Gudai has a population of approximately 1,500–2,000 people. The village hosts two separate high schools for boys and girls, as well as a co-educational private institution known as the Read Foundation School Gudai. Additional facilities include a hospital, tehsildar office, post office, police station, forest rangers' office, and a market with around 35 shops. The literacy rate in the village is above 60%, in line with the district average of 62.8%.

The local economy is primarily agrarian. Potatoes and wheat are staple crops, and fruits such as apricots, cherries, and apples are commonly cultivated in the region.

The Gudai River provides fresh water for domestic use. Two rivers converge near the village, and trout fishing is popular in the summer months. The surrounding mountains are known for containing precious stones, which attract tourists to the area. A few hotels also operate in the village to accommodate visitors.

The first Speaker of the Gilgit-Baltistan Assembly, Justice Sahib Khan; forest conservationist Muhammad Alam; and Basharatullah, Director of the Special Education Complex, are all from Gudai.
