= Jaffarabad, Gilgit-Baltistan =

Jaffarabad, Gilgit-Baltistan may refer to:

- Jaffarabad, Gilgit district
- Jaffarabad, Nagar district
