= Sakwar =

Coordinates: 35°53′N 74°23′E

Sakwar is a town in Gilgit District, Pakistan.

Sakwar is located inside Gilgit city. It is often referred as the entrance to Gilgit city. Sakwar has native population of seven families and headed by a Jirga council (Urdu جرگہ ) Shina (جرگہ داری).

Nominated families are

Gama

Bogar

Dengaey

Ghori

Khanna

Daswah

Bakhan
