= Eidgah, Astore =

Eidgah (Urdu: عید گاہ) is a locality in Astore that serves as the administrative headquarters of Astore District in the Diamer Division of Gilgit-Baltistan, Pakistan.

The local name for the town is "Sango". It is bounded to the east by Choungrah, to the north by Astore Bazar, to the west by Fina and to the south by Bolen. There are two Union Councils in Eidgah village. Eidgah is the valley that offers access to Gorikot (the largest valley of District Astore), then Gudai, Challam and ends with the plains of the Deosai National Park. The people of Sango are called Songoch.

== Sub Villages ==
The following are the small villages associated with Eidghah:

- Ibraheemi Het
- Raja Mahala
- Ghrom
- Dorikot
- Akhrial
- Ghanu
- Fatbati het
- Bunjo
- bade Het
