= Tangir (city) =

Tangir تانگیر
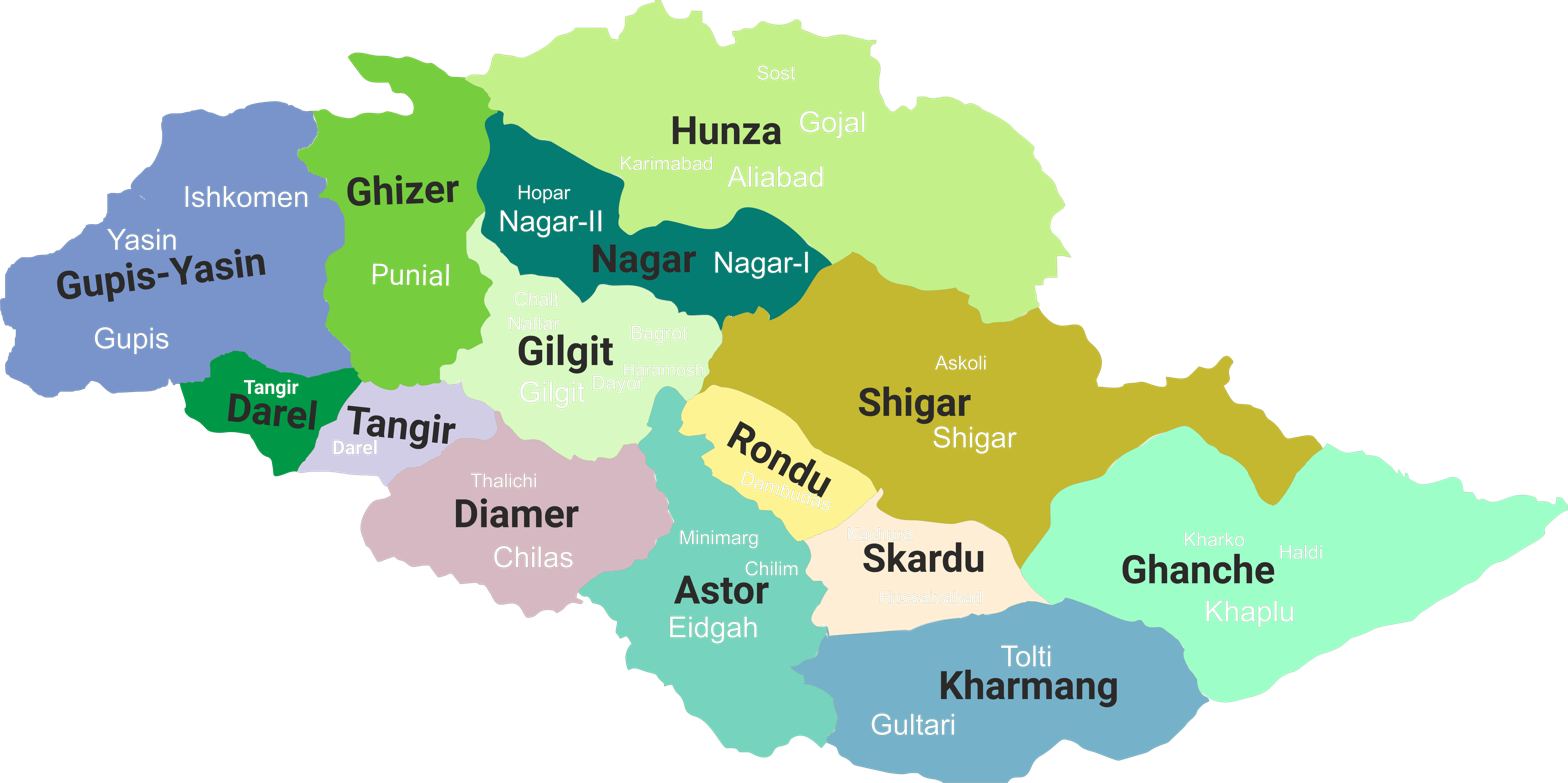
- Autonomous state: Gilgit-Baltistan
- District: Darel District
- Time zone: UTC+5:00 (PST)

Tangir (Urdu: تانگیر) city serves as the administrative capital of the Tangir District in Gilgit-Baltistan, Pakistan. In 2019, when Darel was made a district, Tangir was made its capital.
