= Astore (city) =

City in Gilgit-Baltistan, Pakistan

Astore استور
- City
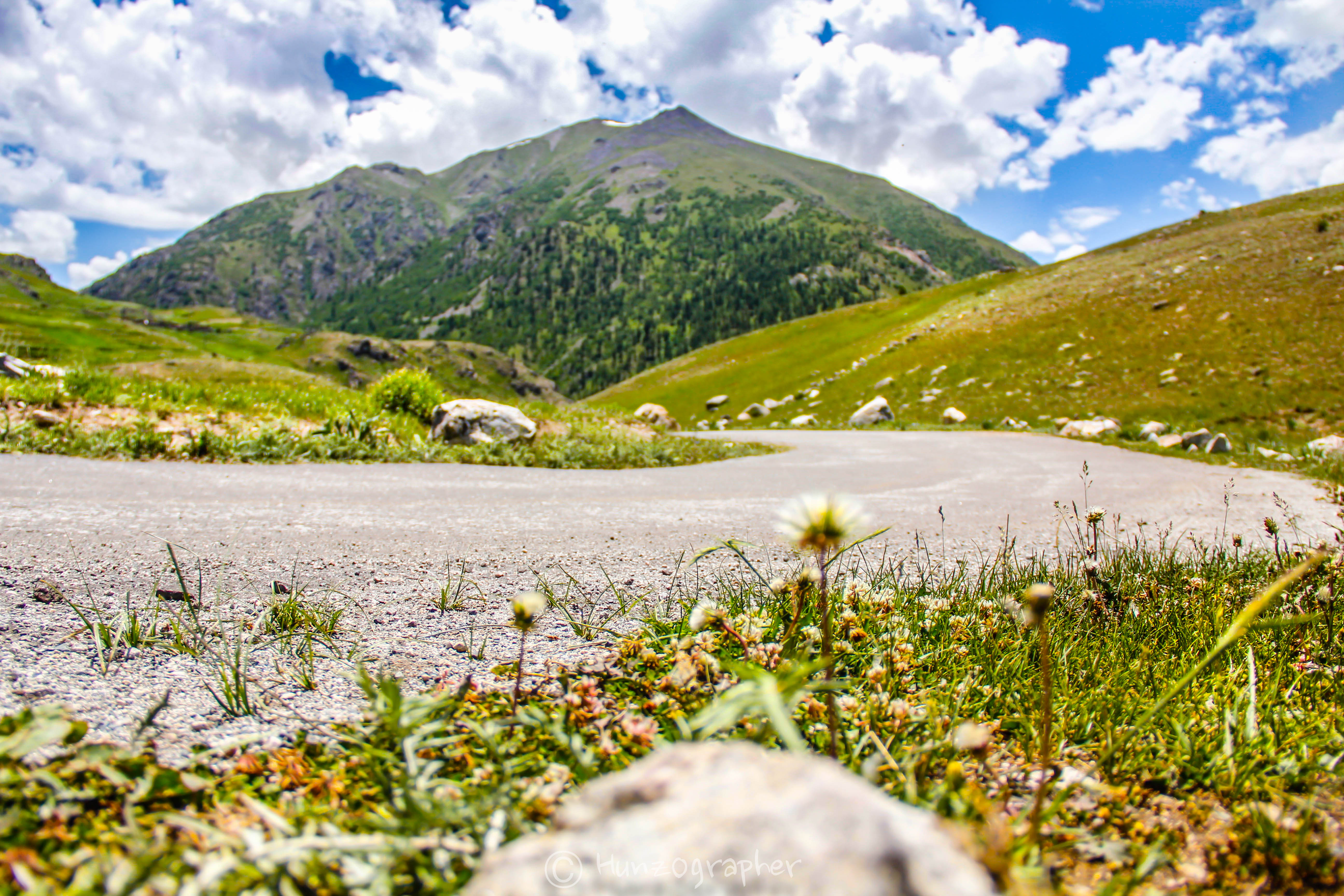
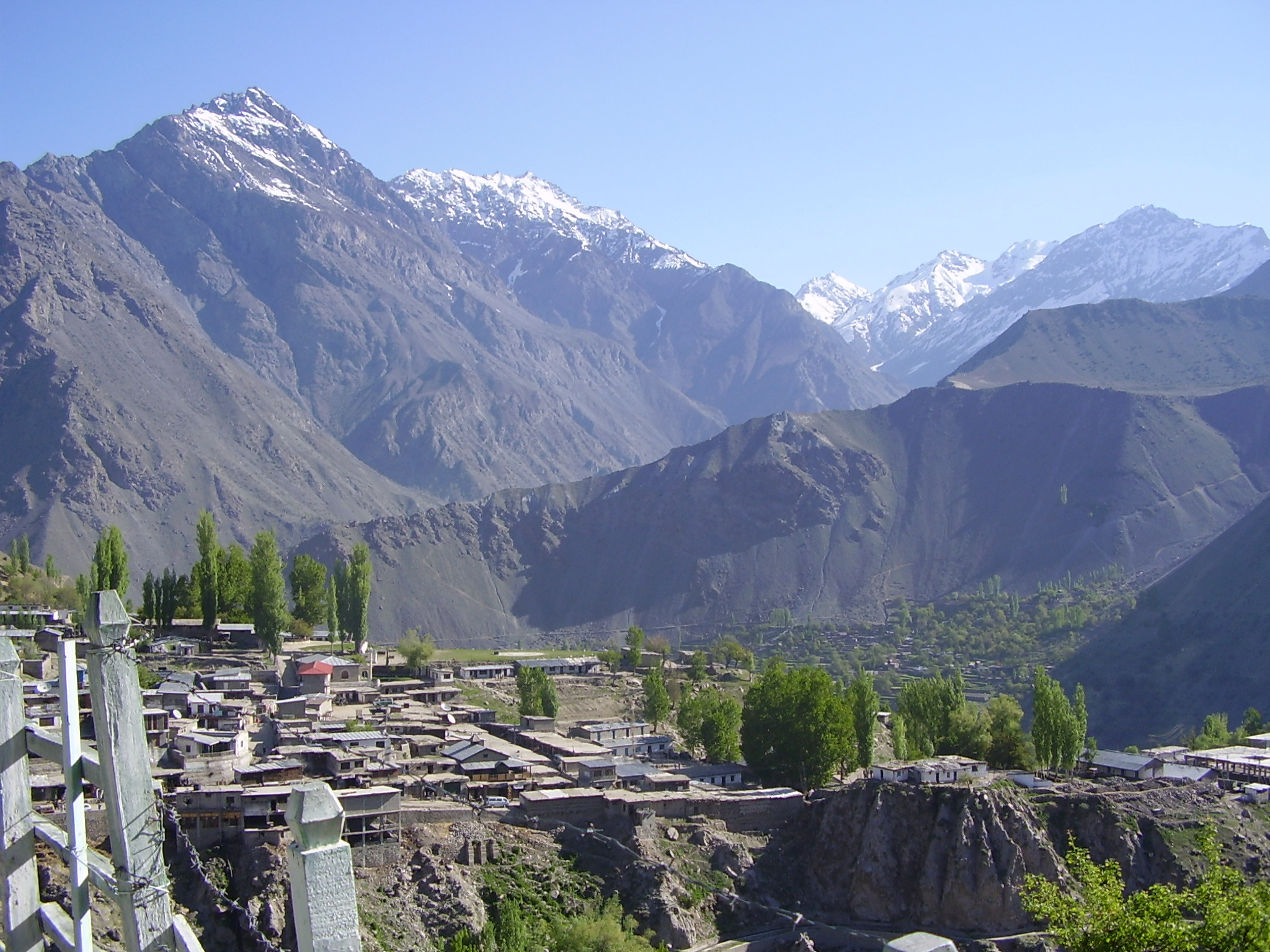
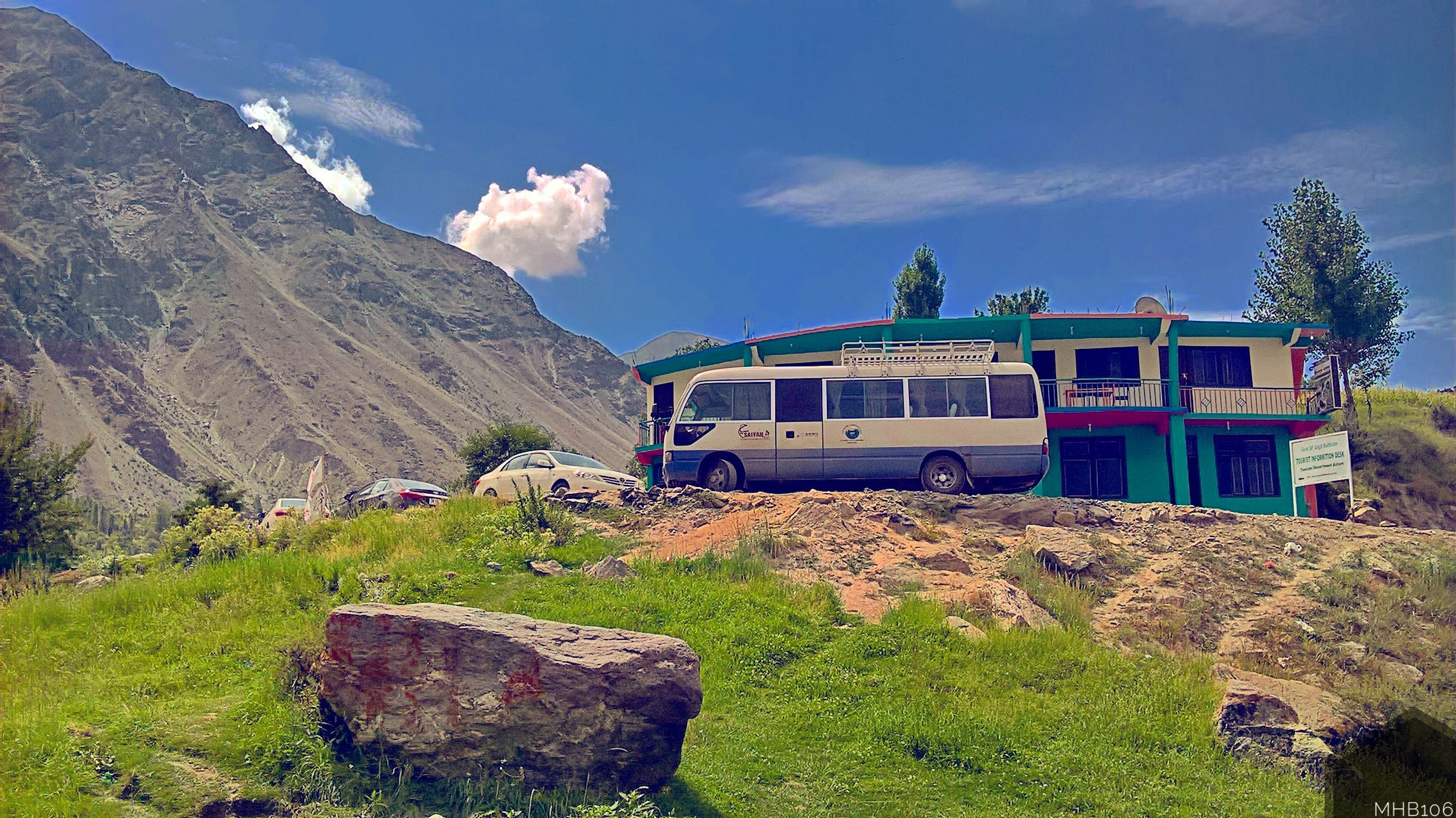
- Mountains and hilltops near Astore City

- Location in Gilgit-Baltistan Location in Pakistan
- Coordinates: 35.22°N 74.51°E
- Country: Pakistan
- Adm. Unit: Gilgit-Baltistan
- District: Astore District
- Elevation: 2,546 m (8,353 ft)
- Time zone: UTC+5:00 (PKT)
- Climate: Dsb

Astore (Urdu: استور) is the main city of Astore District in Gilgit-Baltistan, Pakistan. The city is situated at an altitude of 2,546 metres (8,353 ft).

The major Astore–Burzul Road, which linked Gilgit (in Pakistani-administered Kashmir) to Srinagar (in Indian-administered Kashmir) was indefinitely closed in 1978 following the development of the China–Pakistan Karakoram Highway.

== Climate ==
Astore has a continental climate (Köppen Dsb).

Climate data for Astore
Month	Jan	Feb	Mar	Apr	May	Jun	Jul	Aug	Sep	Oct	Nov	Dec	Year
Record high °C (°F)	12.3 (54.1)	15.9 (60.6)	20.3 (68.5)	27.2 (81.0)	30.1 (86.2)	35.0 (95.0)	37.0 (98.6)	34.4 (93.9)	31.7 (89.1)	27.7 (81.9)	21.0 (69.8)	14.0 (57.2)	37.0 (98.6)
Mean daily maximum °C (°F)	2.8 (37.0)	4.3 (39.7)	8.9 (48.0)	15.0 (59.0)	19.9 (67.8)	24.7 (76.5)	27.1 (80.8)	26.9 (80.4)	23.2 (73.8)	17.5 (63.5)	11.4 (52.5)	5.3 (41.5)	12.5 (54.5)
Mean daily minimum °C (°F)	−7.2 (19.0)	−5.3 (22.5)	−0.9 (30.4)	3.9 (39.0)	7.6 (45.7)	11.3 (52.3)	14.6 (58.3)	14.6 (58.3)	10.3 (50.5)	4.6 (40.3)	−0.4 (31.3)	−4.4 (24.1)	3.2 (37.8)
Record low °C (°F)	−17.7 (0.1)	−21.0 (−5.8)	−12.0 (10.4)	−5.0 (23.0)	−1.7 (28.9)	1.1 (34.0)	6.5 (43.7)	5.6 (42.1)	−1.1 (30.0)	−1.7 (28.9)	−9.0 (15.8)	−16.1 (3.0)	−21 (−6)
Average rainfall mm (inches)	42.4 (1.67)	48.5 (1.91)	78.2 (3.08)	87.6 (3.45)	65.6 (2.58)	22.8 (0.90)	22.9 (0.90)	24.1 (0.95)	21.9 (0.86)	23.8 (0.94)	16.4 (0.65)	29.1 (1.15)	401.8 (15.82)
Average relative humidity (%) (at 17:00 PST)	60.3	56.6	45.5	36.8	32.6	28.8	31.8	32.8	29.6	28.6	34.3	53.5	39.3
Source: Pakistan Meteorological Department
