= Darel District =

Darel District ضلع داریل
- District of Gilgit-Baltistan administered by Pakistan
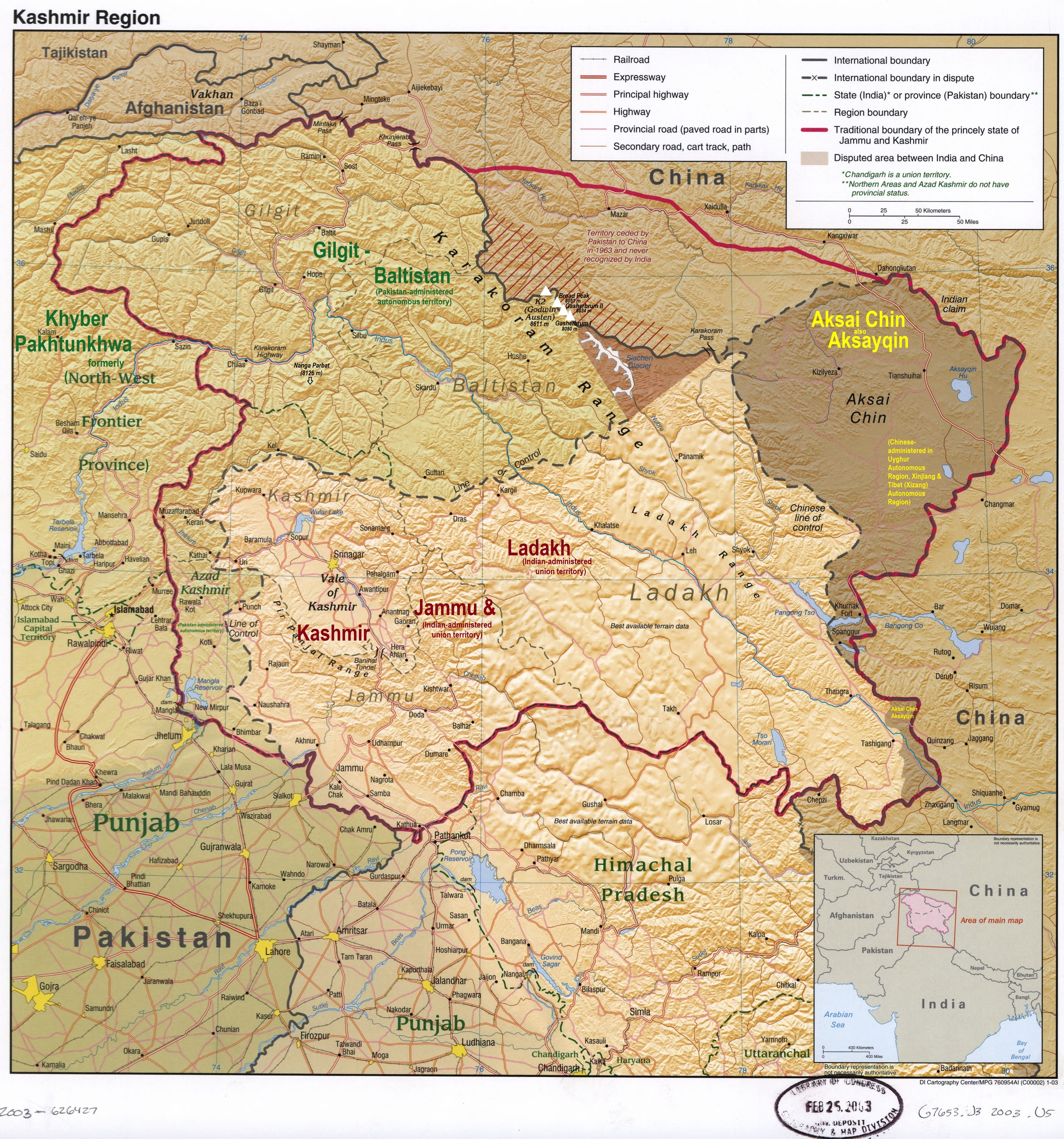
- A map showing Pakistani-administered Gilgit-Baltistan (shaded in sage green) in the disputed Kashmir region
- Interactive map of Darel District
- Coordinates: 35.561°N 73.594°E
- Administering country: Pakistan
- Territory: Gilgit-Baltistan
- Division: Diamer Division
- Headquarters: Darel

Government
  - Type: District Administration
  - Deputy Commissioner: N/A
  - District Police Officer: N/A
  - District Health Officer: N/A

Area (per UNOSAT)
  - Total: 1,657 km^{2} (640 sq mi)

Population (per UNOSAT, 2023)
  - Total: 54,348
  - Density: 32.80/km^{2} (84.95/sq mi)

Languages
  - Official language: Urdu
- Number of tehsils: 1

Darel District (Urdu: ضلع داریل) is a district of Pakistan's Gilgit-Baltistan area in the disputed Kashmir region. It lies south-west of Gilgit District. It is one of the 14 districts of Gilgit−Baltistan. Its population lives mainly in the valley of the Darel River, a right tributary of the Indus River.

Prior to 2019, Darel District was a tehsil of the Diamer District, along with Tangir and Chilas.

== Geography ==
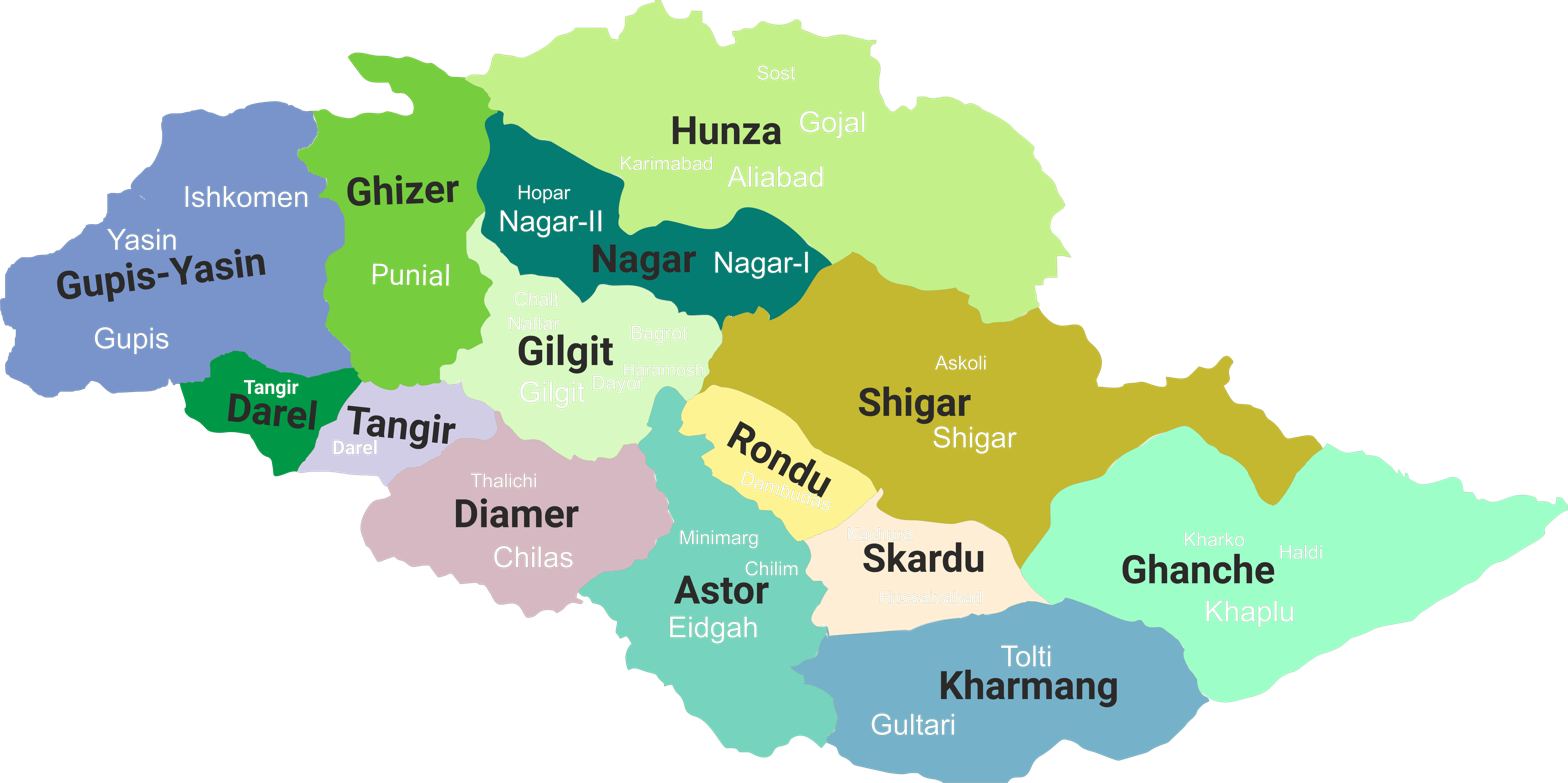
District map of Gilgit-Baltistan (Note: On the map, the Darel District is incorrectly shown as Tangir and vice versa.)

Darel District is bounded on the north by the Ghizer District, on the north-east by Gilgit District, on the southeast by Diamer District, and on the south and west by the Upper Kohistan District of Pakistan's Khyber Pakhtunkhwa Province.

== See also ==
- Districts of Pakistan
  - Districts of Khyber Pakhtunkhwa, Pakistan
  - Districts of Punjab, Pakistan
  - Districts of Balochistan, Pakistan
  - Districts of Sindh, Pakistan
  - Districts of Azad Kashmir
  - Districts of Gilgit-Baltistan
- Divisions of Pakistan
  - Divisions of Balochistan
  - Divisions of Khyber Pakhtunkhwa
  - Divisions of Punjab
  - Divisions of Sindh
  - Divisions of Azad Kashmir
  - Divisions of Gilgit-Baltistan
