= List of districts in Gilgit-Baltistan =

Districts of Pakistani-administered Kashmir

Districts of Gilgit-Baltistan
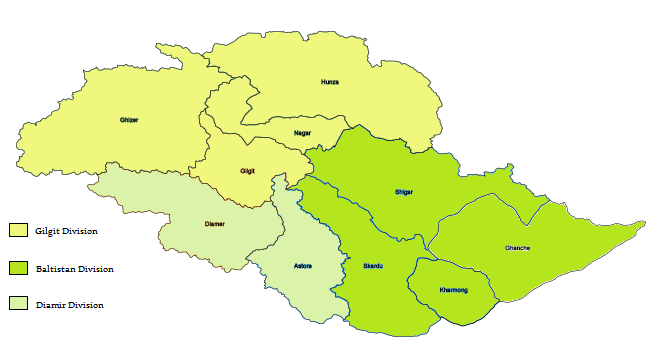
- Map of the districts of Gilgit-Baltistan
- Location: Gilgit-Baltistan
- Number: 10 (as of 2024)
- Populations: 337,329 (Diamer District) – 61,304 (Kharmang District)
- Areas: 12,381 km^{2} (4,780 sq mi) (Ghizer District) – 4,137 km^{2} (1,597 sq mi) (Nagar District)
- Government: District Government; City District Government; Zilla Council
- Subdivisions: Tehsils

As of 2024, the Pakistani-administered Gilgit–Baltistan in the disputed Kashmir region consists of 10 notified districts. The ten districts are divided among three divisions: four in Baltistan Division, four in Gilgit Division, and two in Diamer Division. Each district is further divided into tehsils and union councils.

== Background ==
After the formation of Northern Areas in 1972, three districts, Gilgit, Diamer and Baltistan were created. In 1974 Ghizer District was carved out of Gilgit and Ghanche District out of Baltistan (renamed Skardu), but both were abolished sometimes later, being re-established only in 1989. In 2004, a sixth district, Astore, was created from Diamer, followed by Hunza-Nagar District from Gilgit in 2008. In 2015, Hunza-Nagar was bifurcated into Hunza and Nagar districts while Kharmang and Shigar districts were carved out from Skardu District. Thus, the number rose from seven to ten after the addition of 2 districts in Baltistan Division and the bifurcation of the Hunza-Nagar district in Gilgit Division. In 2019, four new districts, Darel, Tangir, Gupis–Yasin and Roundu were announced, but as of 2024, have not been established.

== List ==
The figures for area and population are according to the statistics issued by the Planning and Development Department of the Government of Gilgit-Baltistan.

Division	District	Area (km^{2})	Capital	Number of Tehsils	Population (2023)	Divisional Capital
Baltistan	Ghanche	8,531	Khaplu	6	157,822	Skardu
Baltistan	Shigar	4,173	Shigar	2	84,608	Skardu
Baltistan	Kharmang	6,144	Kharmang	1	61,304	Skardu
Baltistan	Skardu	10,168	Skardu	4	278,885	Skardu
Gilgit	Gilgit	4,208	Gilgit	3	324,552	Gilgit
Gilgit	Ghizer	12,381	Gahkuch	5	200,069	Gilgit
Gilgit	Hunza	10,109	Aliabad	3	65,497	Gilgit
Gilgit	Nagar	4,137	Nagar	3	87,410	Gilgit
Diamer	Diamer	7,234	Chilas	5	337,329	Chilas
Diamer	Astore	5,411	Eidghah	2	111,573	Chilas
Total		72,496		34	1,709,049	

== See also ==
- List of tehsils of Gilgit-Baltistan
- Districts of Pakistan
  - Districts of Khyber Pakhtunkhwa, Pakistan
  - Districts of Punjab, Pakistan
  - Districts of Balochistan, Pakistan
  - Districts of Sindh, Pakistan
  - Districts of Azad Kashmir
- Divisions of Pakistan
  - Divisions of Balochistan
  - Divisions of Khyber Pakhtunkhwa
  - Divisions of Punjab
  - Divisions of Sindh
  - Divisions of Azad Kashmir
  - Divisions of Gilgit-Baltistan
- List of districts of Ladakh, in Indian-administered Jammu and Kashmir
- List of districts of Jammu and Kashmir, in Indian-administered Jammu and Kashmir
