= Nathu Shah =

Punjabi military commander

Colonel Nathu Shah (died 1848) was a military commander in the Sikh Empire and later the princely state of Jammu and Kashmir. He conquered Astore and Gilgit on the behalf of maharaja Sher Singh in 1842–43, and acted as the governor of Gilgit until his death in a battle against the Mir of Hunza in 1848.

== Career ==
Nathu Shah was a Punjabi Sayyid from Gujranwala in Punjab and held the rank of colonel in the Khalsa Army. In 1842, the ruler of Yasin Gaur Rahman killed Shah Sikander, the raja of Gilgit and occupied Gilgit. His brother Karim Khan went to Kashmir, then a province of Sikh Empire, to obtain help against him. The governor of Kashmir Muhyuddin dispatched a troop numbering 1,000 under Nathu Shah to Gilgit. On his way Nathu Shah directly annexed Astore into Sikh kingdom which until then had been its tributary. He defeated Gaur Rahman at Basin three miles away from Gilgit, who retired to Punial. Later Gaur Rahman of Yasin, Ghazan Khan of Hunza and Jaffer Khan of Nagir entered a treaty with Nathu Shah, accordingly, all three gave a daughter in marriage to Nathu Shah and recognised his authority over Gilgit. Karim Khan was made nominal raja of Gilgit while Nathu Shah kept actual control in his hands. After making appropriate arrangements Nathu Shah returned to Punjab.

In 1846, the British sold Kashmir including Astore and Gilgit to Gulab Singh of Jammu in the treaty of Amritsar. Nathu Shah transferred his allegiance to Jammu and Kashmir and took change of Gilgit. In 1847 Nathu Shah allowed some Europeans to visit Gilgit and Hunza. However, the Mir of Hunza Ghazan Khan was hostile to European presence and accused Nathu Shah of conspiring with them. He attacked Gilgit and plundered several of its villages. Nathu Shah invaded Hunza to avenge it but was ambushed and killed in 1848. Karim Khan who was accompanying him was also killed.
