= Tangir District =

Tangir District ضلع تانگیر
- District of Gilgit-Baltistan
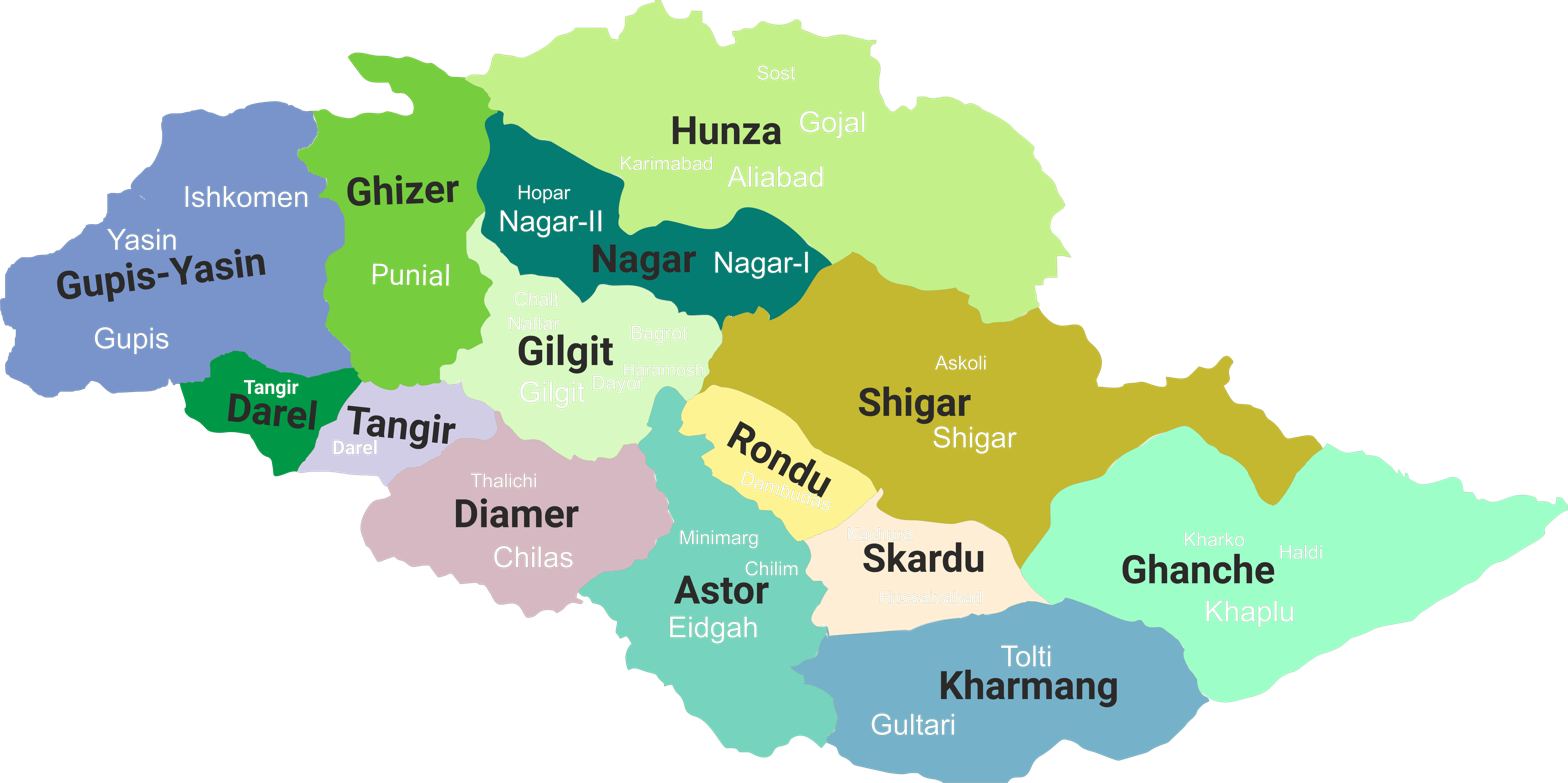
- District map of Gilgit-Baltistan (Note: On the map, the Tangir District is incorrectly shown as Darel and vice versa.)
- Administering country: Pakistan
- Territory: Gilgit-Baltistan
- Division: Diamer Division
- Headquarters: Tangir

Government
  - Type: District Administration
  - Deputy Commissioner: N/A
  - District Police Officer: N/A
  - District Health Officer: N/A

Area (per UNOSAT)
  - Total: 1,106 km^{2} (427 sq mi)

Population (2023, per UNOSAT)
  - Total: 31,257
  - Density: 28.26/km^{2} (73.20/sq mi)

Languages
  - Official language: Urdu
- Number of tehsils: 1

Tangir District (Urdu: ضلع تانگیر) is a district in the Pakistani-administered territory of Gilgit-Baltistan in the disputed Kashmir region. It lies 67 km from Chilas. Its population lives mainly in the valley of the Tangir River, a right tributary of the Indus River.

== History ==
Prior to 2019, the Tangir District was a tehsil of the Diamer District, along with Darel and Chilas.

== Geography ==
The Tangir District is bounded on the north by the Gupis-Yasin District, on the north-east by the Ghizer District, on the east by the Darel District, and on the south and west by the Upper Kohistan District of Pakistan's Khyber Pakhtunkhwa Province.
