= Astore District =

District in Pakistan-administered Gilgit-Baltistan

Astore District ضلع استور
- District of Gilgit−Baltistan administered by Pakistan.
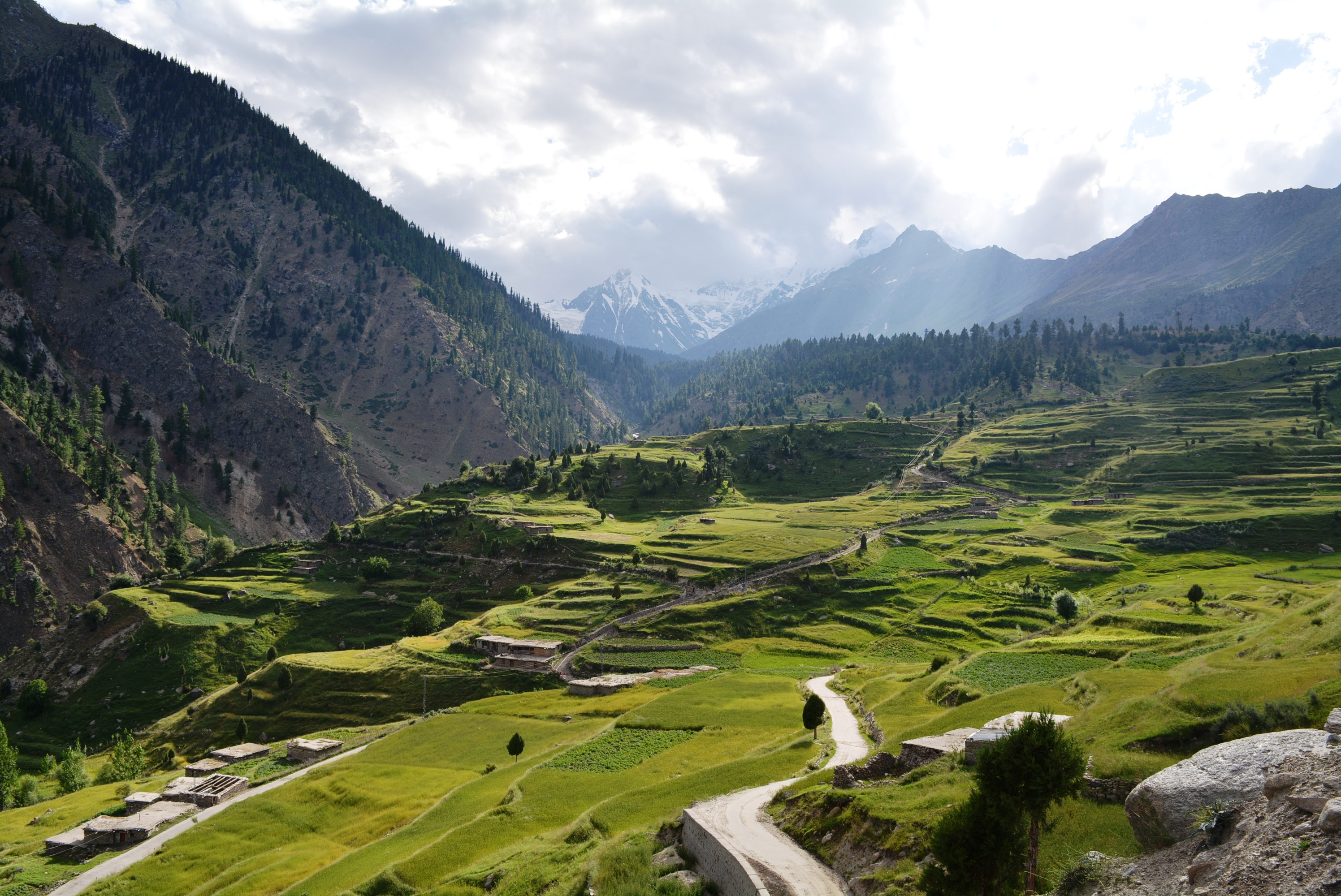
- Nanga Parbat as seen from the Rama Valley near Astore District in August 2016

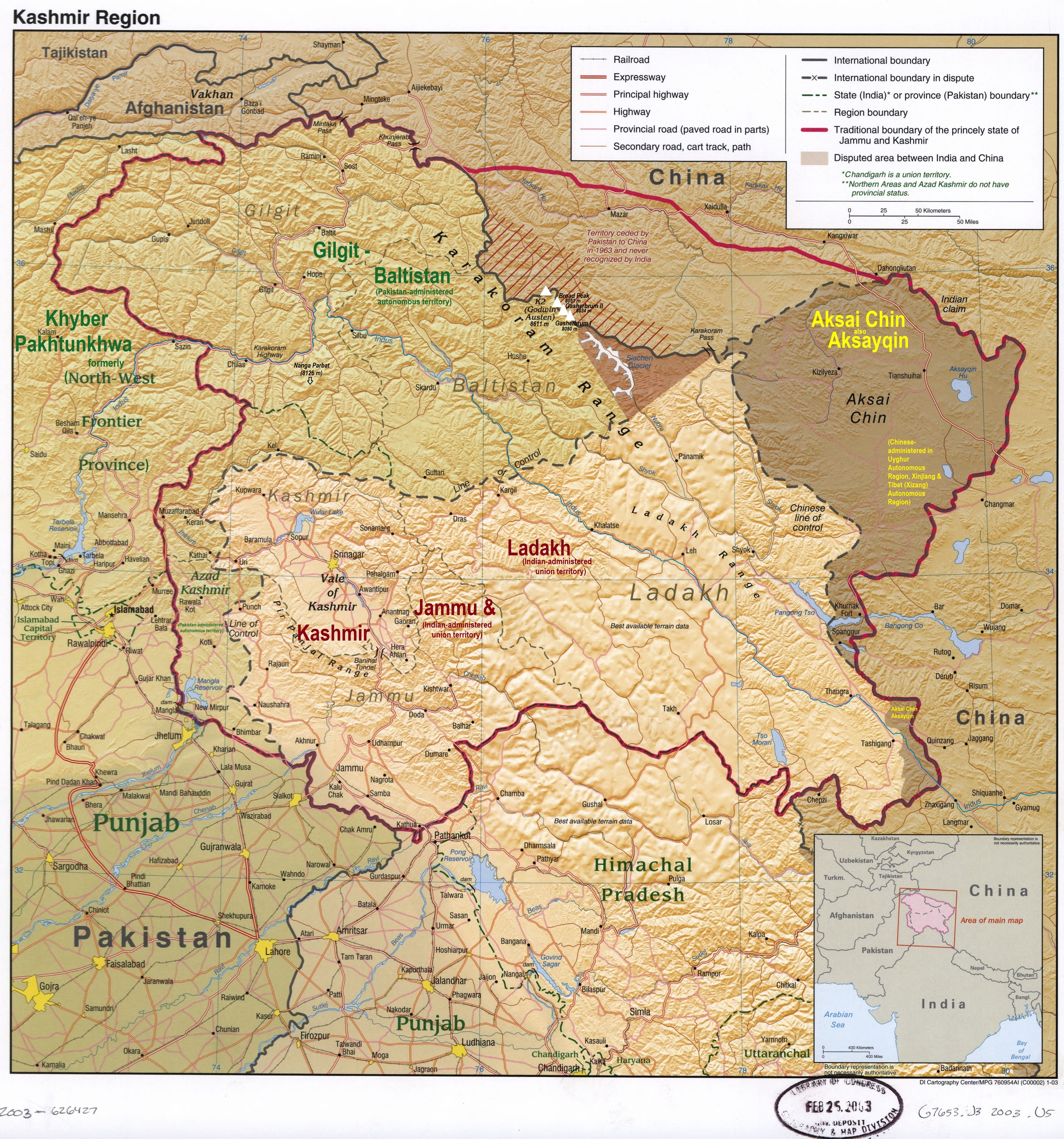
- A map showing Pakistani-administered Gilgit-Baltistan (shaded in sage green) in the disputed Kashmir region
- Interactive map of Astore District
- Coordinates (Eidgah, Astore): 35°20′49″N 74°51′22″E
- Administering country: Pakistan
- Territory: Gilgit-Baltistan
- Division: Diamer
- First establishment: 1935
- Re-established: 2004
- Headquarters: Eidgah

Government
  - Type: District Administration

Area
  - Total: 5,411 km^{2} (2,089 sq mi)

Population (2023)
  - Total: 111,573
  - Density: 20.62/km^{2} (53.40/sq mi)
- Number of tehsils: 2

Astore District (Urdu: ضلع استور) is a district of Pakistan-administered Gilgit-Baltistan in the disputed Kashmir region. Its administrative headquarters are located at Eidgah in the Astore Valley.

Astore District is bounded by Gilgit District to the north, Skardu District to the east, Kharmang District to the southeast, Diamer District to the west, the Neelum District of Azad Jammu and Kashmir to the southwest, and the Bandipore District of Indian-administered disputed Kashmir region to the south.

== Geography ==
Astore District within Gilgit−Baltistan

The Astore District largely coincides with the Astore Valley and has an area of 5,411 km^{2}. It lies at an altitude of 2,600 m (8,500 ft). The valley has approximately 250 km^{2} (97 sq mi) of glacier cover. The nearest glacier after entering the valley is the Harcho Glacier, and the most accessible is the Siachen Glacier. Overall less than 6% of the district is covered by forests, with 43% of land consisting of alpine and winter pastures.

== History ==
Astore was ruled by a branch of Maqpon dynasty of Skardu until 1842, when it was annexed by Col. Nathu Shah for Sikh Empire, later becoming a part of the princely state of Jammu and Kashmir in 1846. Astore is one of the oldest districts in Gilgit-Baltistan, being first established in 1935. After 1947 Gilgit Rebellion it became a part of Pakistan and was made a subdivision of Gilgit Agency. After the administrative reforms in 1972 Northern Areas were established and Astore became a tehsil of newly created Diamer District. It was granted district status in 2004.

== Transport ==
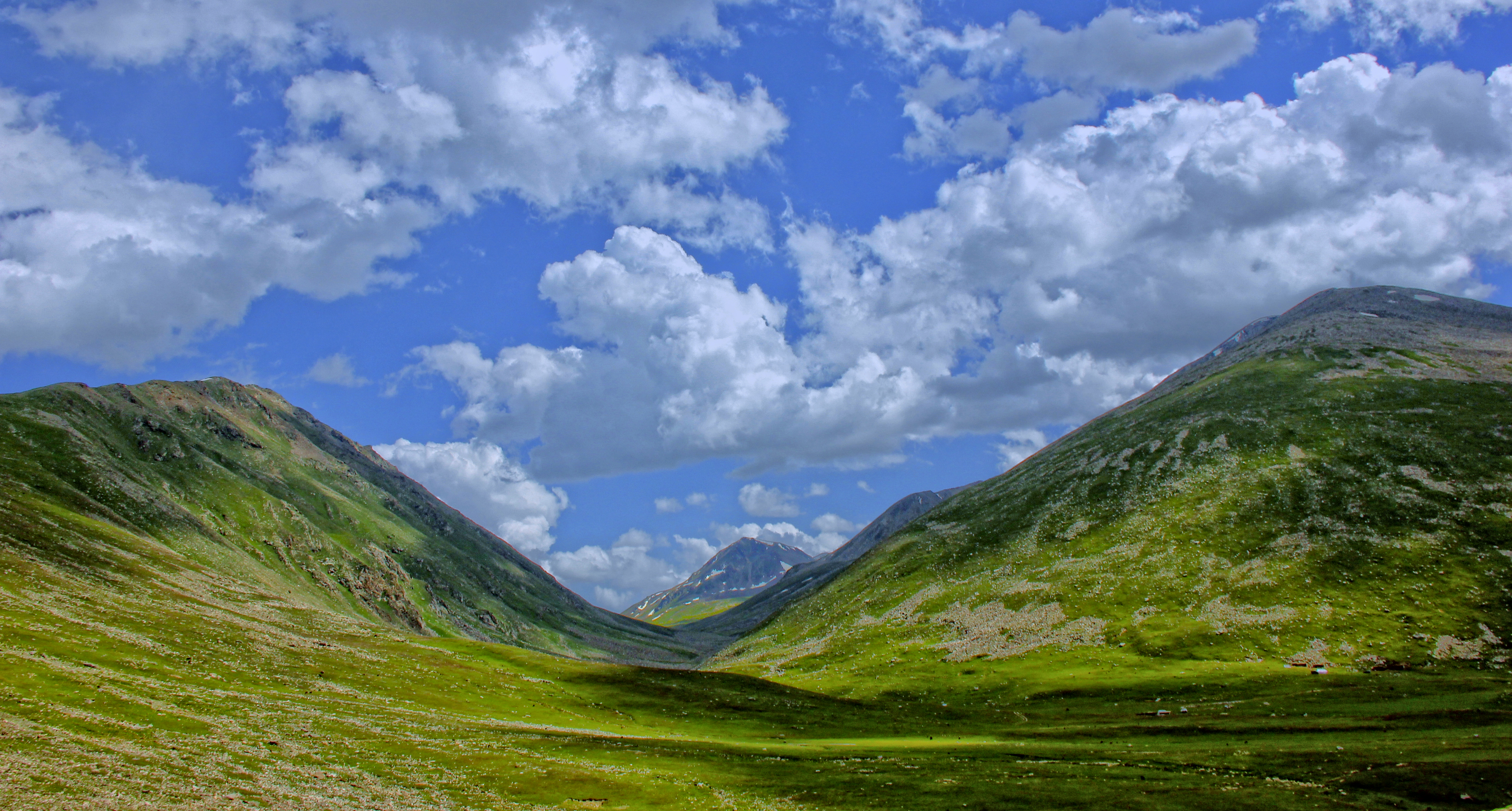
A view of the terrain on the way to Astore

Astore is connected to Gilgit, which is well connected by air with Islamabad and by road with Peshawar, Swat, Islamabad-Rawalpindi, Chitral, and Skardu. There are two ways of access to Eidgah. The first is from Skardu via the Deosai Plateau 143 kilometres (89 mi), but that route cannot be used from November to June due to heavy snowfall. The second route, usable the year round, is from Gilgit via Jaglot 128 kilometres (80 mi).

== Notable people ==
- Shama Khalid, Governor of Gilgit Baltistan (2010 – 2010)
- Khalid Khurshid, Chief Minister of Gilgit-Baltistan (2020 – 2023)
- Yar Muhammad, Chief Minister of Gilgit-Baltistan (2024 – present)
- Shamsul Haq Lone, Member of Gilgit-Baltistan Assembly (2020 – 2025)
