= Gilgit District =

Gilgit District ضلع گلگت گلیٗت ضلع
- District of Gilgit-Baltistan
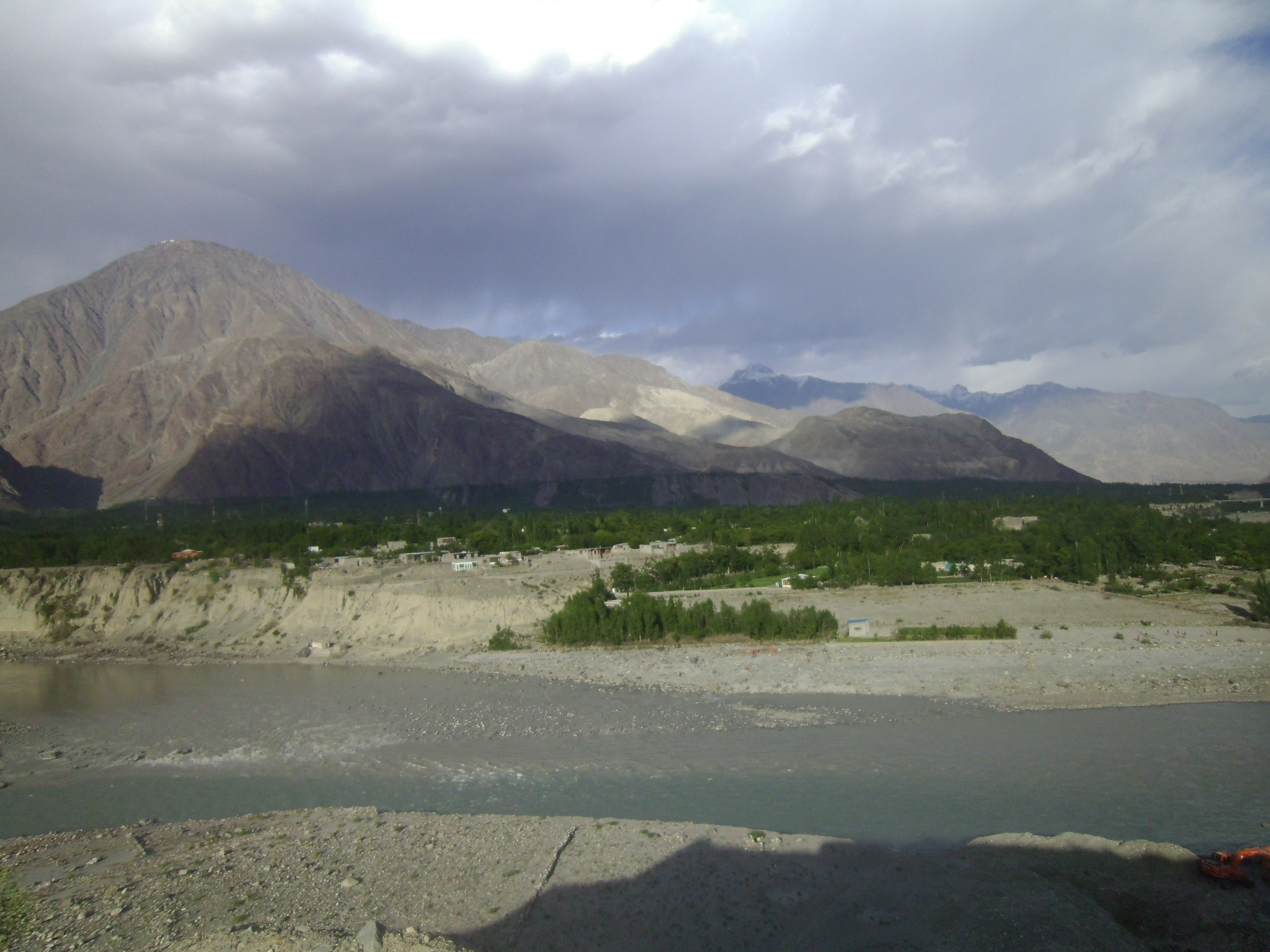

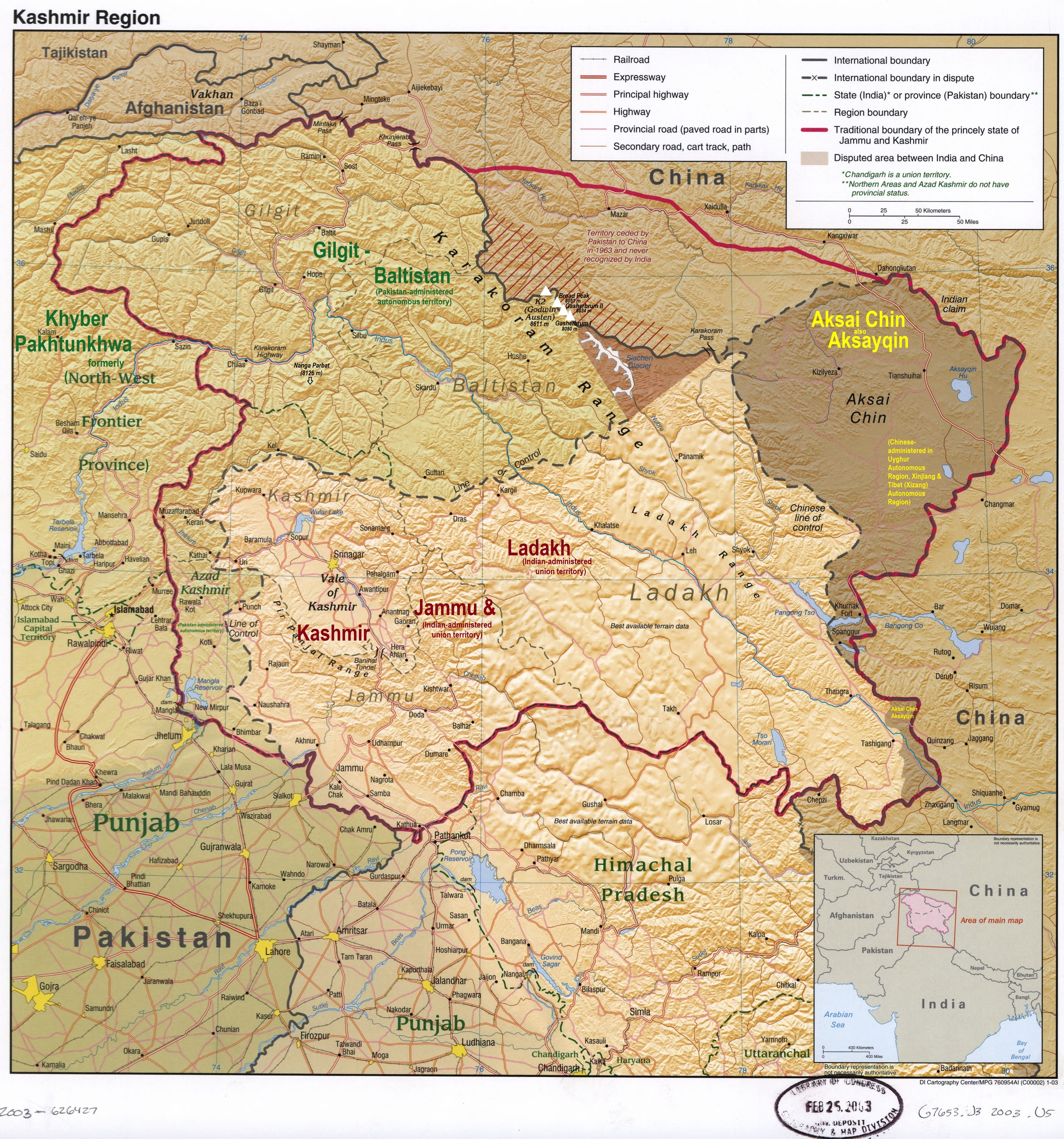
- A map showing Pakistani-administered Gilgit-Baltistan (shaded in sage green) in the disputed Kashmir region
- Interactive map of Gilgit District
- Coordinates: 35°57′N 74°28′E
- Administering country: Pakistan
- Territory: Gilgit-Baltistan
- Division: Gilgit Division
- District Headquarters: Gilgit

Government
  - Type: District Administration
  - Deputy Commissioner: Ameer Azam Hamza (DMS)
  - District Police Officer: Ahmad Shah (PSP)
  - District Health Officer: N/A

Area
  - Total: 4,208 km^{2} (1,625 sq mi)

Population (2023)
  - Total: 324,552
  - Density: 77.13/km^{2} (199.8/sq mi)
- Number of tehsils: 3

The Gilgit District (Urdu: ضلع گلگت) is a district in Pakistan-administered territory of Gilgit-Baltistan in the disputed Kashmir region. The headquarters of the district is the town of Gilgit. The district includes the Bagrot Valley, Juglot, Danyore, Sultanabad, Naltar Valley, and the Nomal Valley. The highest peak in the district is Distaghil Sar 7,885 metres (25,869 ft), which is the seventh-highest peak in Pakistan and 19th highest in the world.

== Geography ==
Map of Gilgit–Baltistan with the Gilgit District highlighted in red

Gilgit District is bounded on the north by the Nagar District, on the east by the Shigar District and the Rondu District, on the south by the Tangir District, the Diamer District, and the Astore District, and on the west by the Ghizer District. Less than 26% of the district consists of alpine pastures, with over 65% of remaining area being barren or permanently snow covered.

=== Rivers ===
The main rivers in the district are:

- Astore River
- Gilgit River, enters the Gilgit District from the west, south of the Bichhar Pass (Naltar Valley) and flows west through the town of Gilgit
- .Hunza River, flows further south and joins the Gilgit River northeast of the town of Gilgit
- Indus River, enters the Gilgit District from the Shigar District about six kilometers north of Jaglot, where the Gilgit River joins the Indus River and flows south along the Karakoram Highway.

=== Lakes ===
- Borit Lake
- Naltar Lake
- Nomal Lake
- Pahote Lake
- Rush Lake

== Demographics ==
At the time of 2023 Census, Gilgit District had a population of 324,552.

In the 1941 census, the Gilgit District (then a tehsil) had a population of 22,495, distributed in 46 villages divided further into 12 subdivisions. Roughly 50% of the population followed Shia Islam and 49% other forms of Islam (Sunni). According to scholar Martin Sökefeld, the Sunni missionaries came from the south, Shia from the east and Ismaili from the north.

== Education ==
According to the Alif Ailaan Pakistan District Education Rankings of 2015, the Gilgit District was ranked 35th out of 148 districts of Pakistan in terms of education. In terms of facilities and infrastructure, the district was ranked 67 out of 148.

== Administration ==
Gilgit District is divided into three tehsils:

- Danyor Tehsil
- Gilgit Tehsil
- Juglot Tehsil

== See also ==
- Districts of Pakistan
  - Districts of Khyber Pakhtunkhwa, Pakistan
  - Districts of Punjab, Pakistan
  - Districts of Balochistan, Pakistan
  - Districts of Sindh, Pakistan
  - Districts of Azad Kashmir
  - Districts of Gilgit-Baltistan
- Divisions of Pakistan
  - Divisions of Balochistan
  - Divisions of Khyber Pakhtunkhwa
  - Divisions of Punjab
  - Divisions of Sindh
  - Divisions of Azad Kashmir
  - Divisions of Gilgit-Baltistan
- 1988 Gilgit massacre
