= Diamer Division =

Administrative division of Gilgit-Baltistan, Pakistan

Diamer-Astore Division دیامر استور ڈویژن
- Region administered by Pakistan as a Division
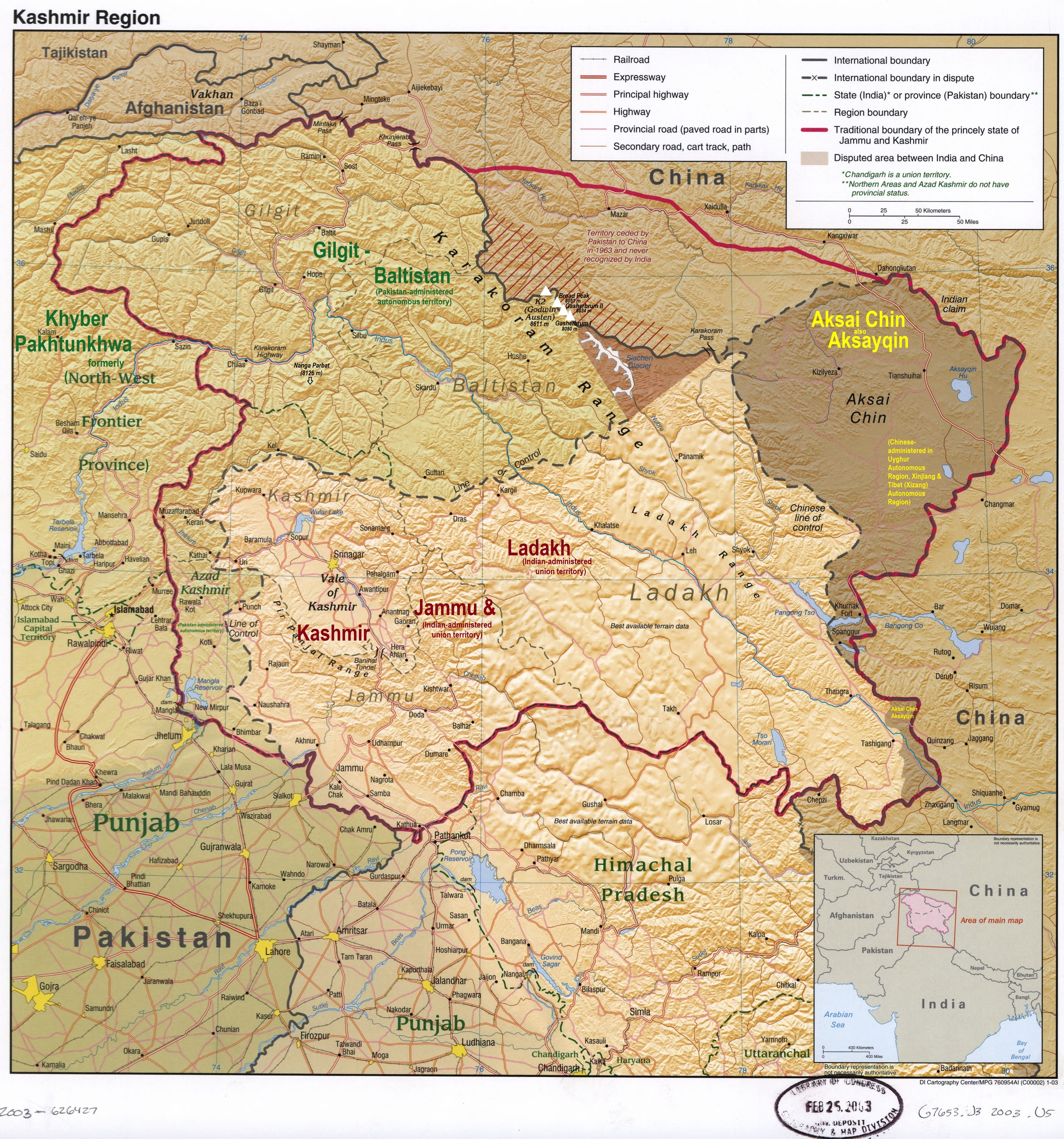
- A map showing Pakistan-administered Gilgit-Baltistan, a part of the disputed Kashmir region.
- Interactive map of Diamer-Astore Division
- Coordinates: 35.4194°N 74.0944°E
- Administering country: Pakistan
- Territory: Gilgit-Baltistan
- Capital: Chilas

Government
  - Type: Divisional Administration
  - Commissioner: N/A
  - Regional Police Officer: N/A

Diamer Division (Urdu: دیامیر ڈویژن), also known as Diamer-Astore Division, is a first-order administrative division of Gilgit-Baltistan region in Pakistan.

The divisional headquarters of the Diamer Division is the town of Chilas. The Diamer Division currently consists of four districts:

District	Area (km²)	Pop. (2023)	Density (ppl/km²) (2023)	Literacy rate (2023)	Union Councils
Astore District					
Darel District					
Diamer District					
Tangir District					

== See also ==
- Chilas
