= Northern Pakistan =

Geographical region in Pakistan

Northern Pakistan شمالی پاکستان
- Region
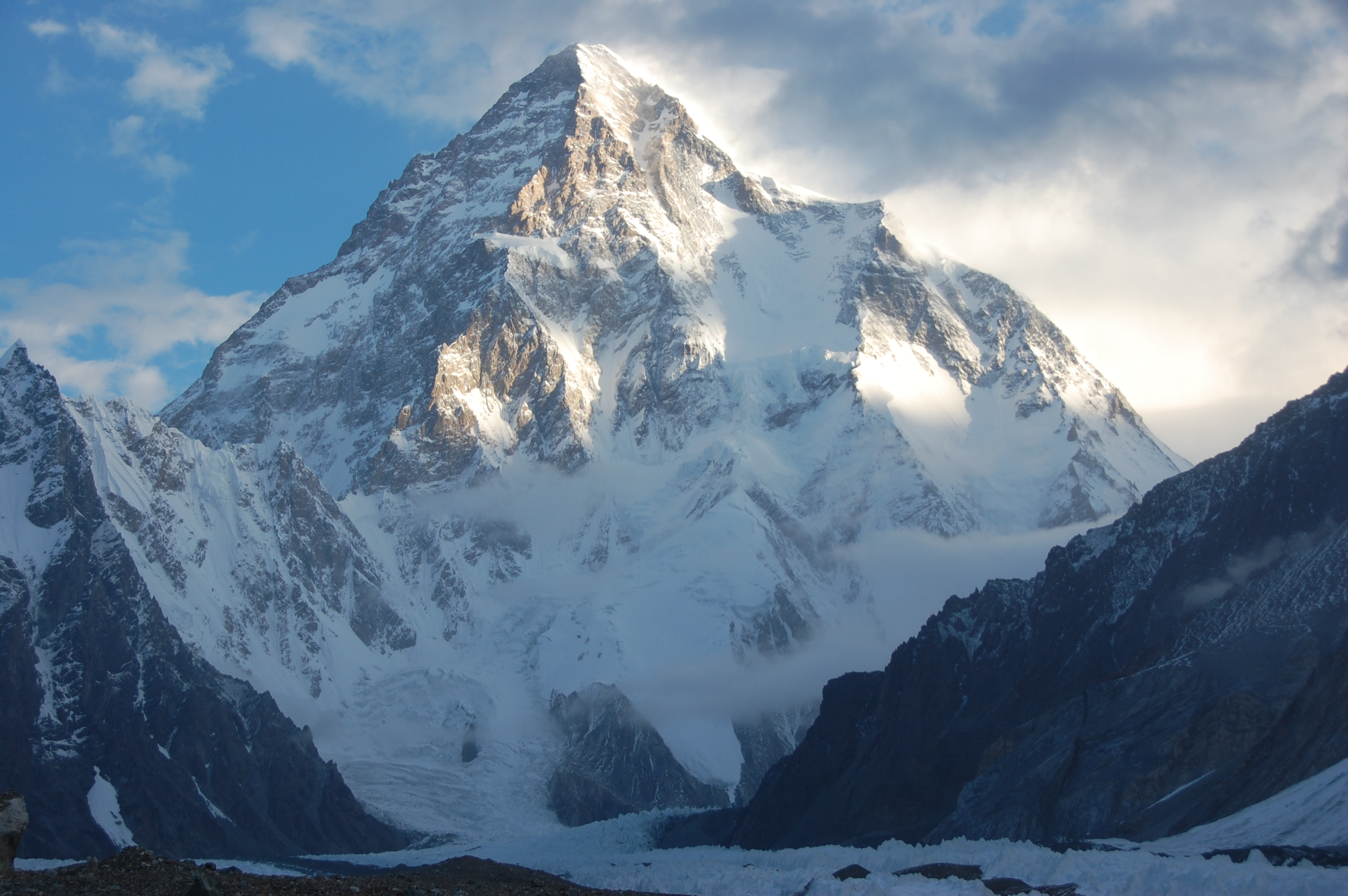
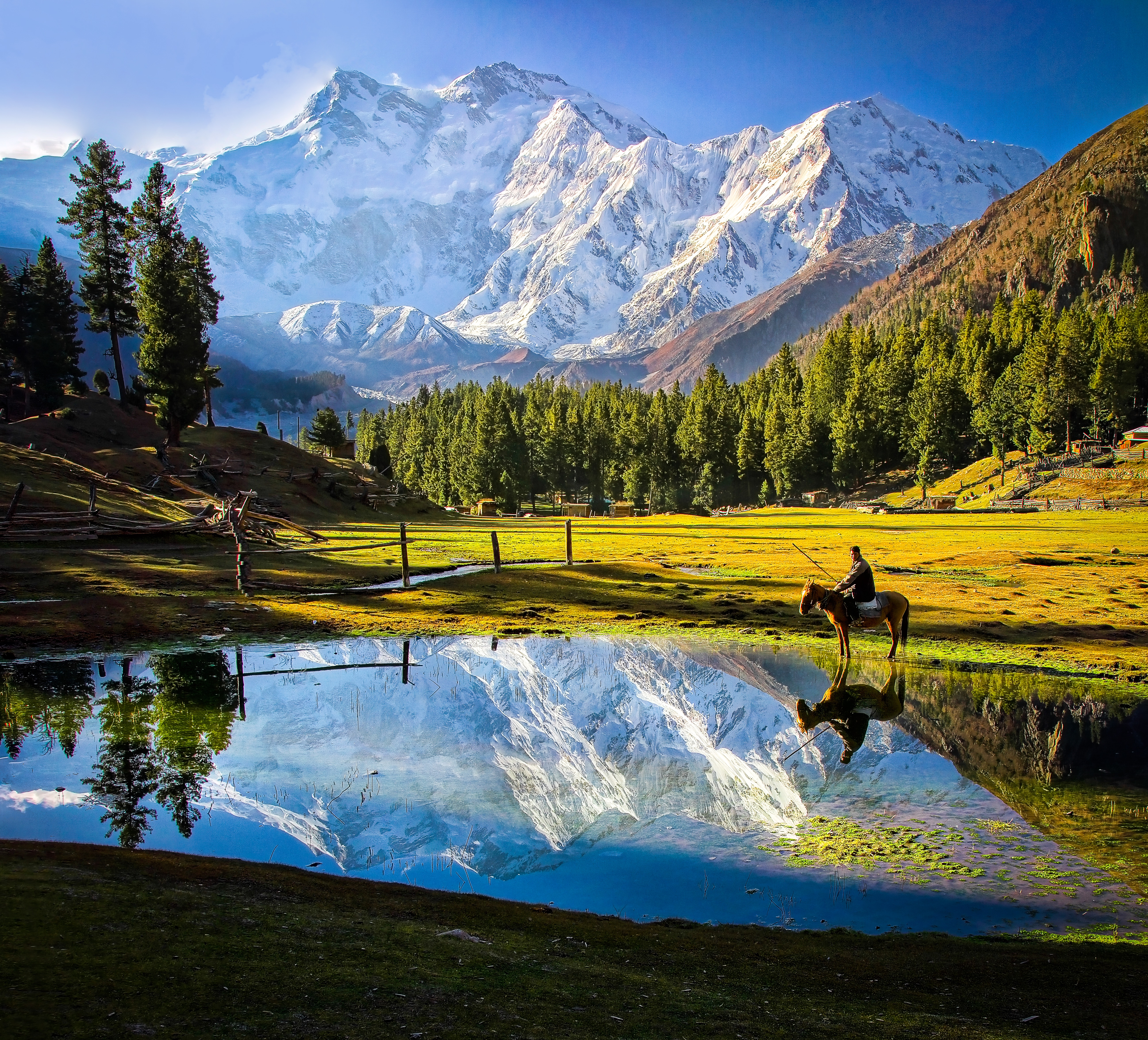
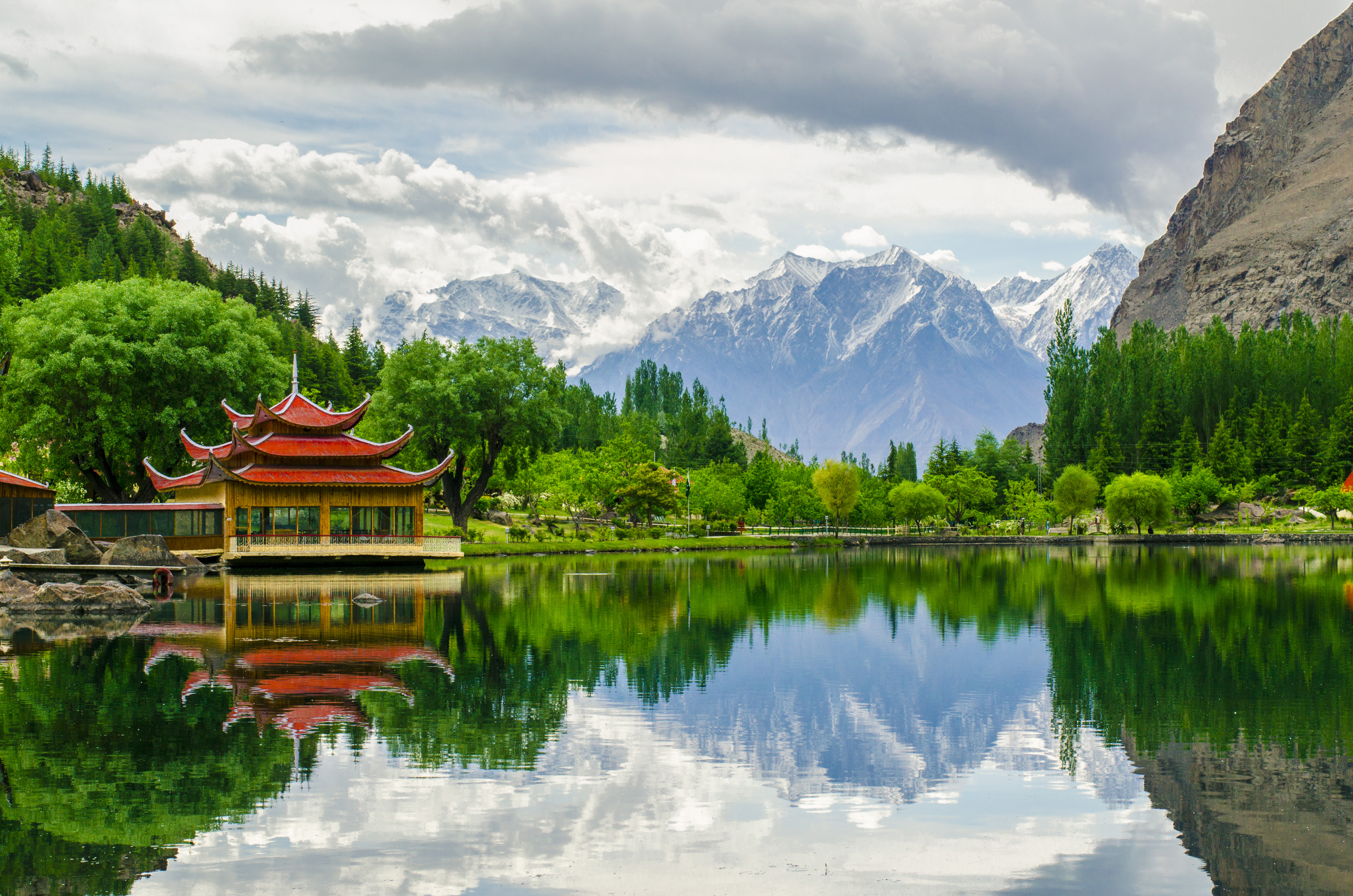
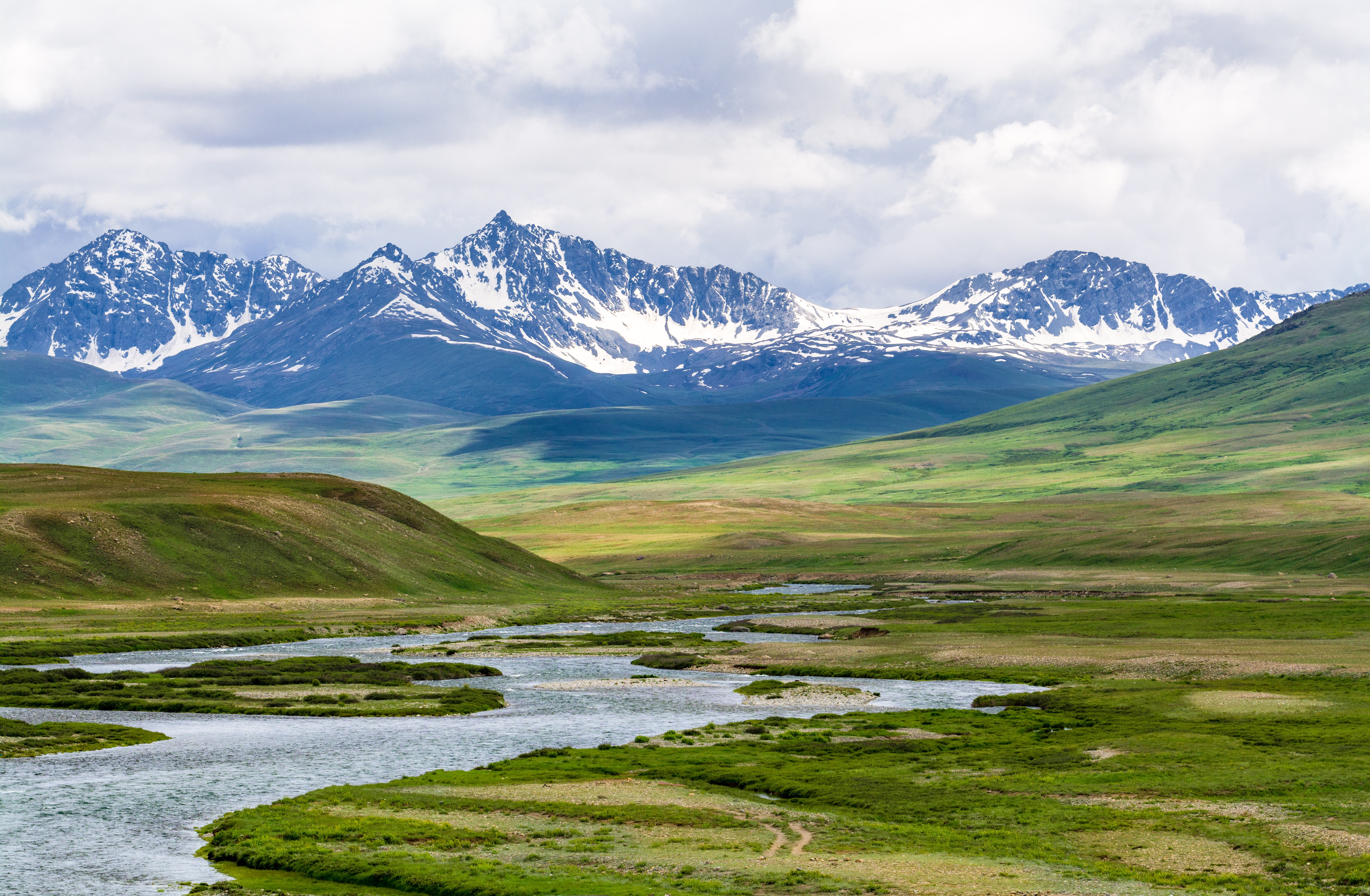
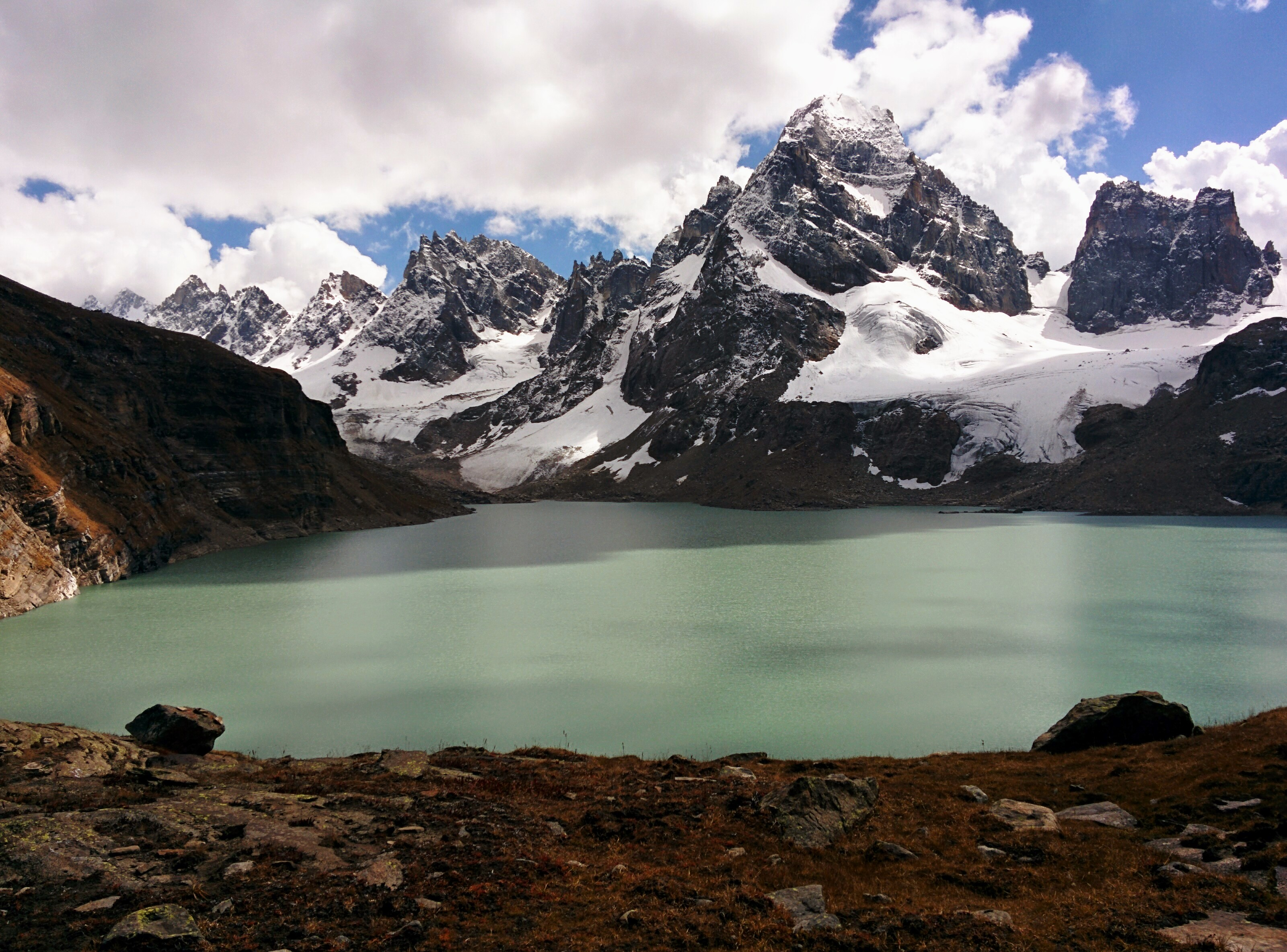
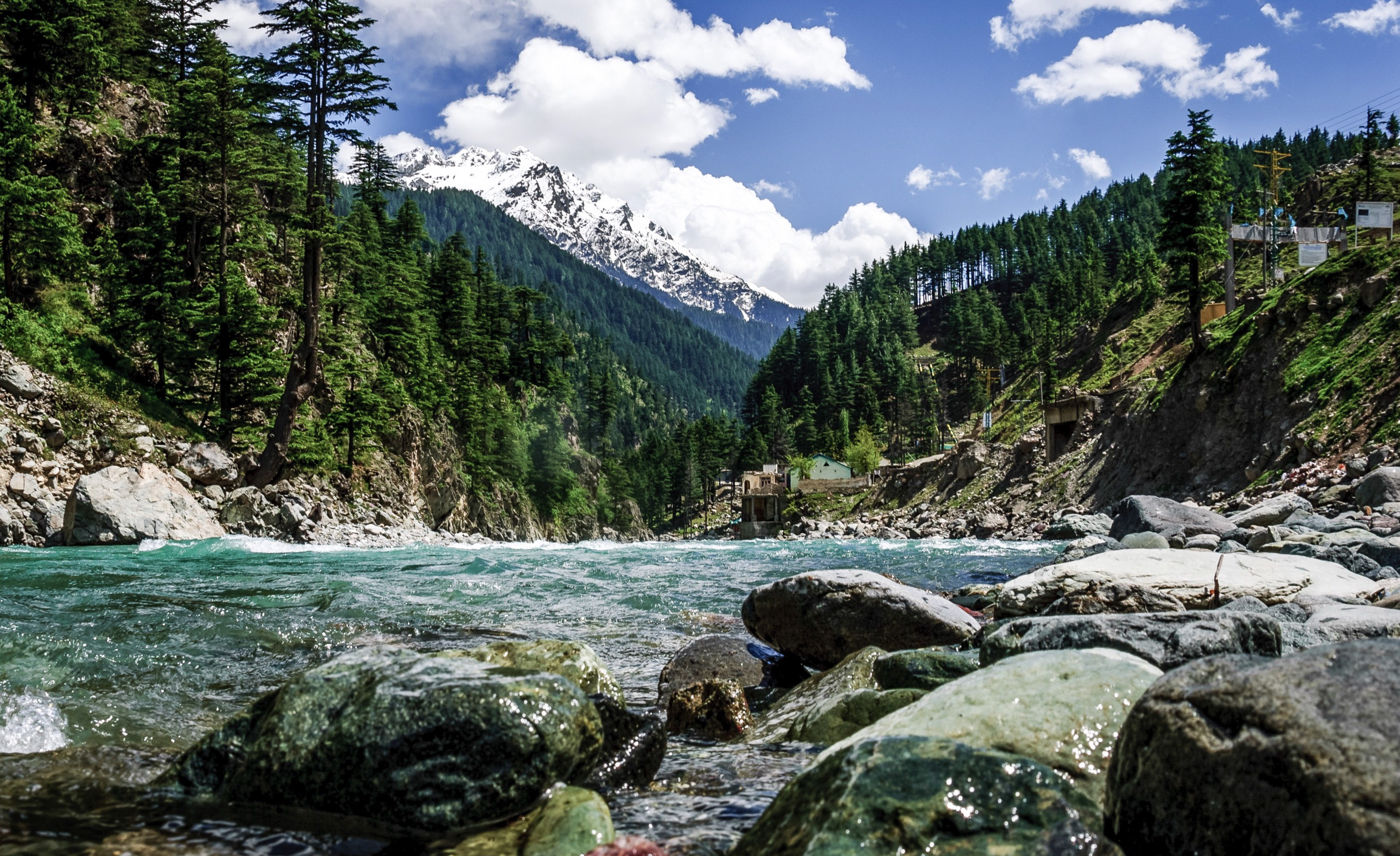
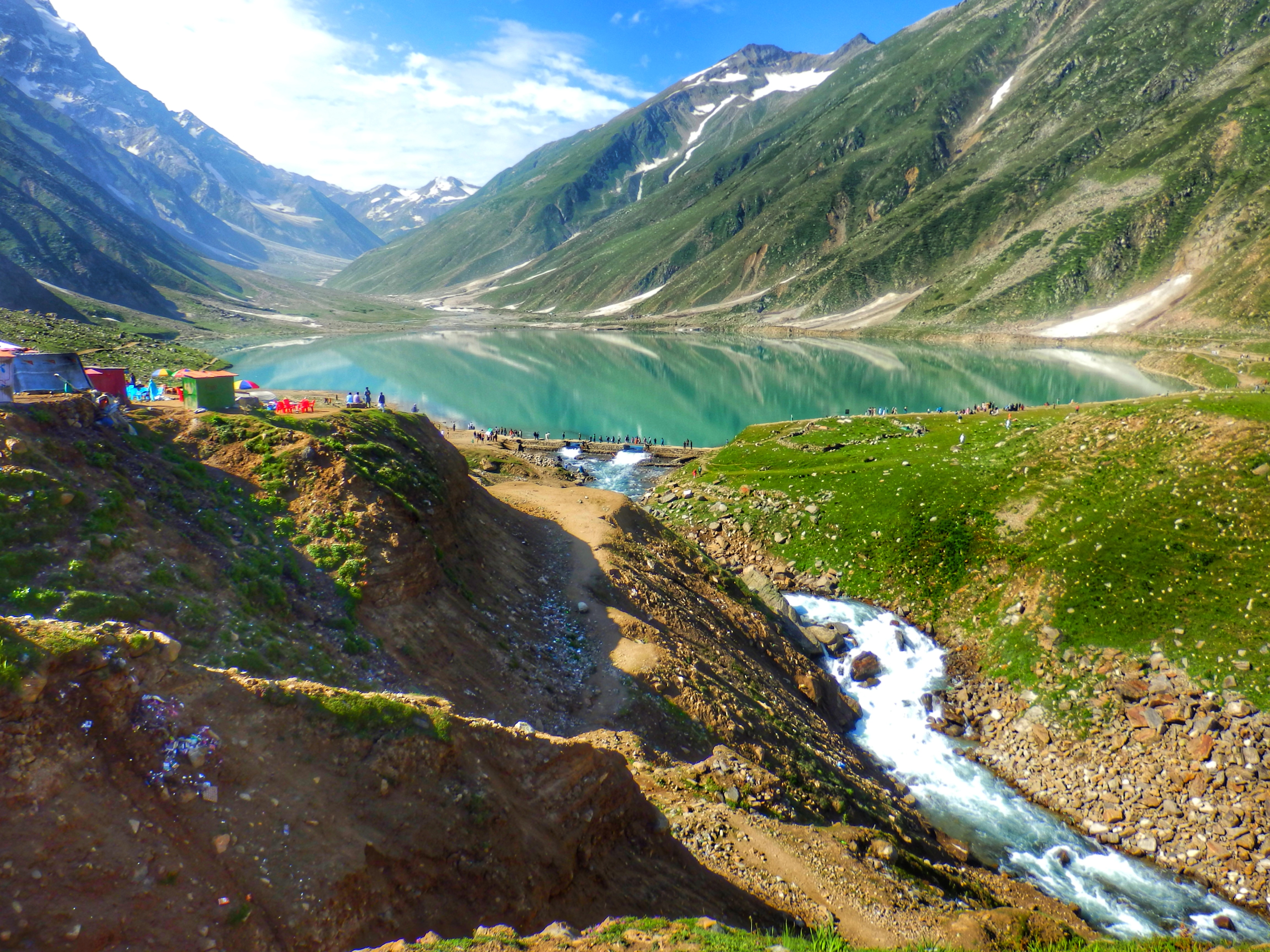
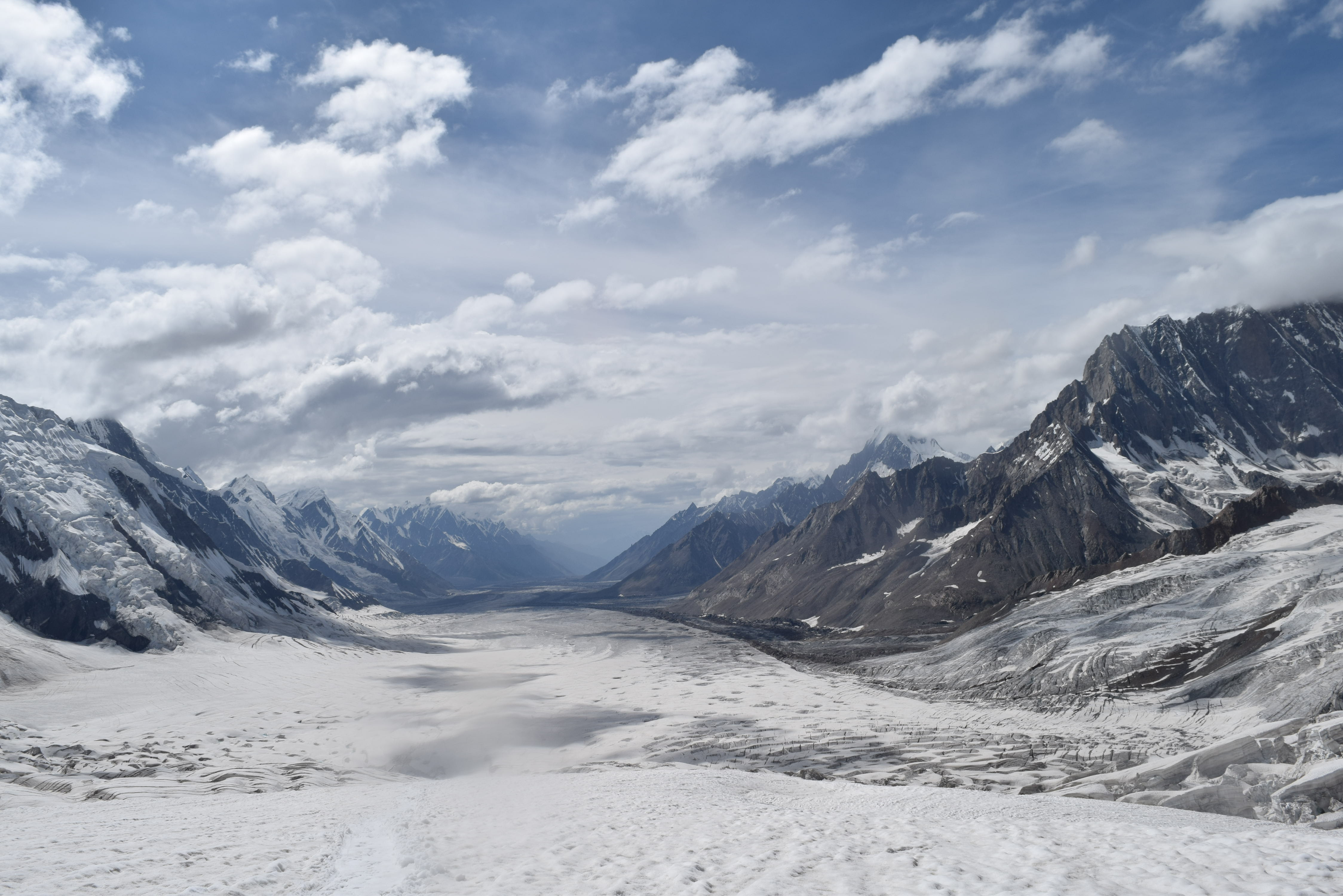
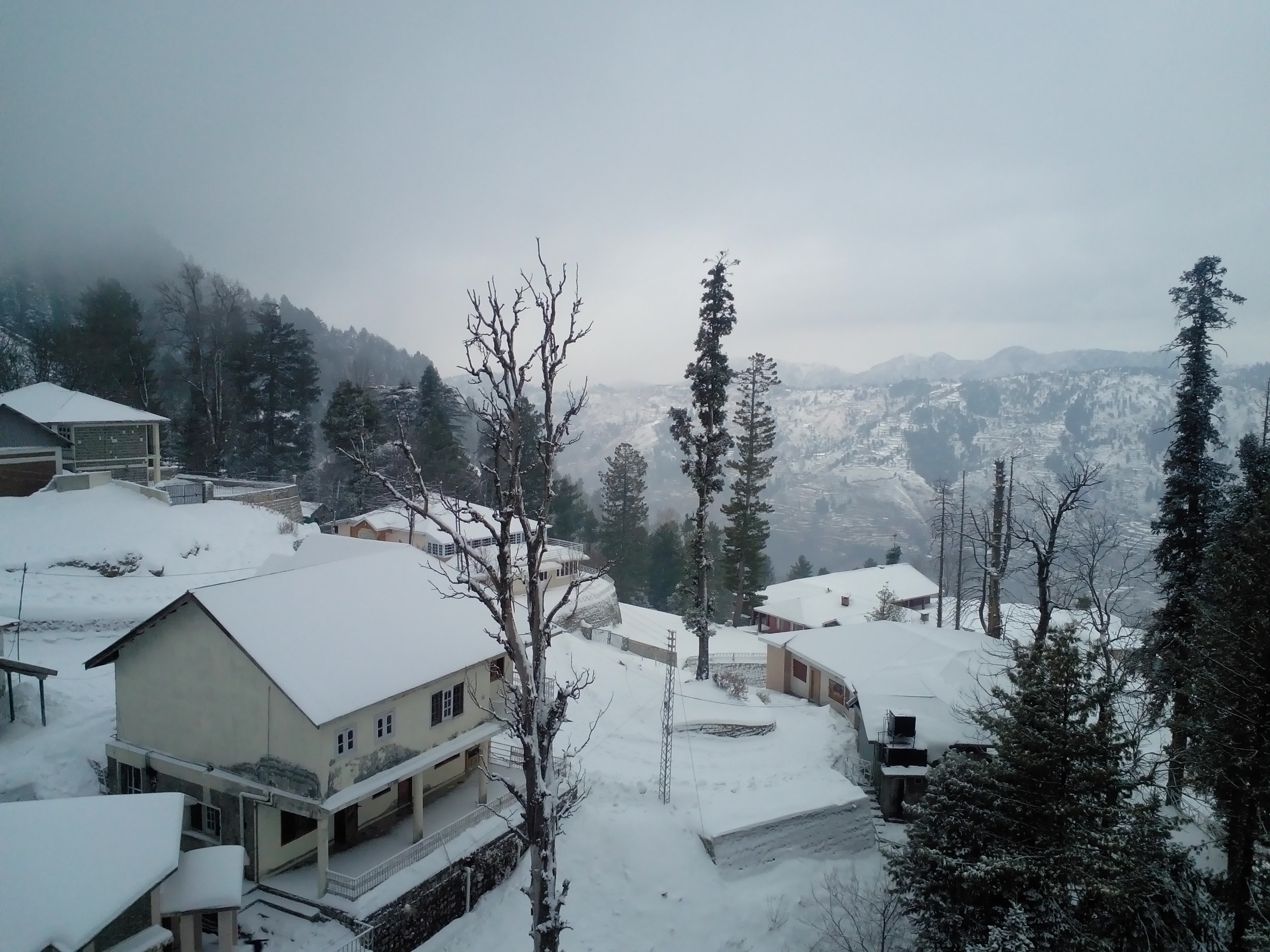
- K2 (8,611m) Nanga Parbat (8,126m) Shangrila Lake Deosai Plains Chitta Katha Lake Swat River Lake Saiful Muluk Biafo Glacier (67 km long) Jhika Gali
- Country: Pakistan
- Adm. Units: Azad Jammu and Kashmir; Gilgit-Baltistan; Islamabad; Khyber Pakhtunkhwa; Punjab (Rawalpindi Division)
- Largest city: Rawalpindi

Area
  - Total: 135,663 km^{2} (52,380 sq mi)
- (Note: The total area of regions of Gilgit-Baltistan, Azad Kashmir, Murree District, Islamabad Capital Territory and Hazara and Malakand Divisions of Khyber Pakhtunkhwa.)
- Time zone: UTC+05:00 (PKT)

Northern Pakistan (Urdu: شمالی پاکستان ALA-LC: śimālī Pākistān) is a tourism region in the northern and north-western parts of Pakistan, comprising the administrative units of Gilgit-Baltistan (formerly known as Northern Areas), Azad Kashmir, Malakand and Hazara divisions in Khyber Pakhtunkhwa, Islamabad Capital Territory and the Murree District in Punjab. The first two territories are Pakistani-administered sectors of the wider Kashmir region. (Note: The Kashmir region also includes Ladakh and Jammu and Kashmir which are claimed by Pakistan due to ongoing Kashmir conflict. These portions are de facto under Indian control.) Northern Pakistan is a mountainous region straddling the Himalayas, Karakoram and the Hindu Kush mountain ranges, containing many of the highest peaks in the world and some of the longest glaciers outside polar regions. Northern Pakistan accounts for a high level of Pakistan's tourism industry.

== Geography ==
The geography of Northern Pakistan is mountainous with terrain differing in each part. The Karakoram range in Gilgit-Baltistan covers the border between Pakistan, India and China in the regions of Ladakh and Xinjiang. The Himalayan range in Pakistan occupies the regions of Kashmir, Kaghan, Kohistan, Deosai and Chilas. The Hindu Kush rises southwest of the Pamirs extending into Swat and Kohistan areas, separated on the east from Karakoram by the Indus River.

Snow often falls in the winter and many towns are closed such as Naran.

== Climate ==
The climate of northern Pakistan is much colder than that of the rest of the country, and it has many glaciers and ice-capped mountains, earning it the nickname "Earth's third pole". The winters (Nov-Mar) are cold and dry, while the summers (Apr-Jun) are warm to hot and very rainy. The rest of the year is warm and sunny.

== Flora and fauna ==
The regions of Khyber Pakhtunkhwa and Gilgit Baltistan include portions of two biodiversity hotspots; Mountains of Central Asia and Himalayas. Some of the wildlife species found in northern mountainous areas and Pothohar Plateau include the Bharal, Eurasian lynx, Himalayan goral, Marco Polo sheep, Marmot (in Deosai National Park) and Yellow-throated marten and birds species of Chukar partridge, Eurasian eagle-owl, Himalayan monal and Himalayan snowcock and amphibian species of Himalayan toad and Muree Hills frog. Threatened species include the Snow leopard, Himalayan brown bear, Indian wolf, Rhesus macaque, Markhor, Siberian ibex and White-bellied musk deer.

== Locations ==
The western part of northern Pakistan include Chitral, Panjkora, Swat, Shangla, Kolai-Palas, Battagram, Kohistan, and Mansehra. These include the famous tourist spots of Chitral, Kalash Valley, Bahrain, Kalam and Kumrat.

Along the Karakoram Highway are major destinations for tourists including the famous Kaghan Valley, Babusar Top, Fairy Meadows, Rakaposhi, Nanga Parbat, Attabad Lake, and Lulusar Lake. Main cities or towns include Mansehra, Balakot, Kiwai, Naran, Kaghan, Batakundi, Jalkhad, Tatta Pani, Chilas, Gilgit, Karimabad, and Passu.

To the east of the Pothohar Plateau is located Azad Kashmir. Main cities of Azad Kashmir include Muzaffarabad, Mirpur, Rawalakot, and Sharda. Banjosa Lake is a major attraction in Poonch District.
