= Batakundi =

Batakundi بٹہ کنڈی
- Village
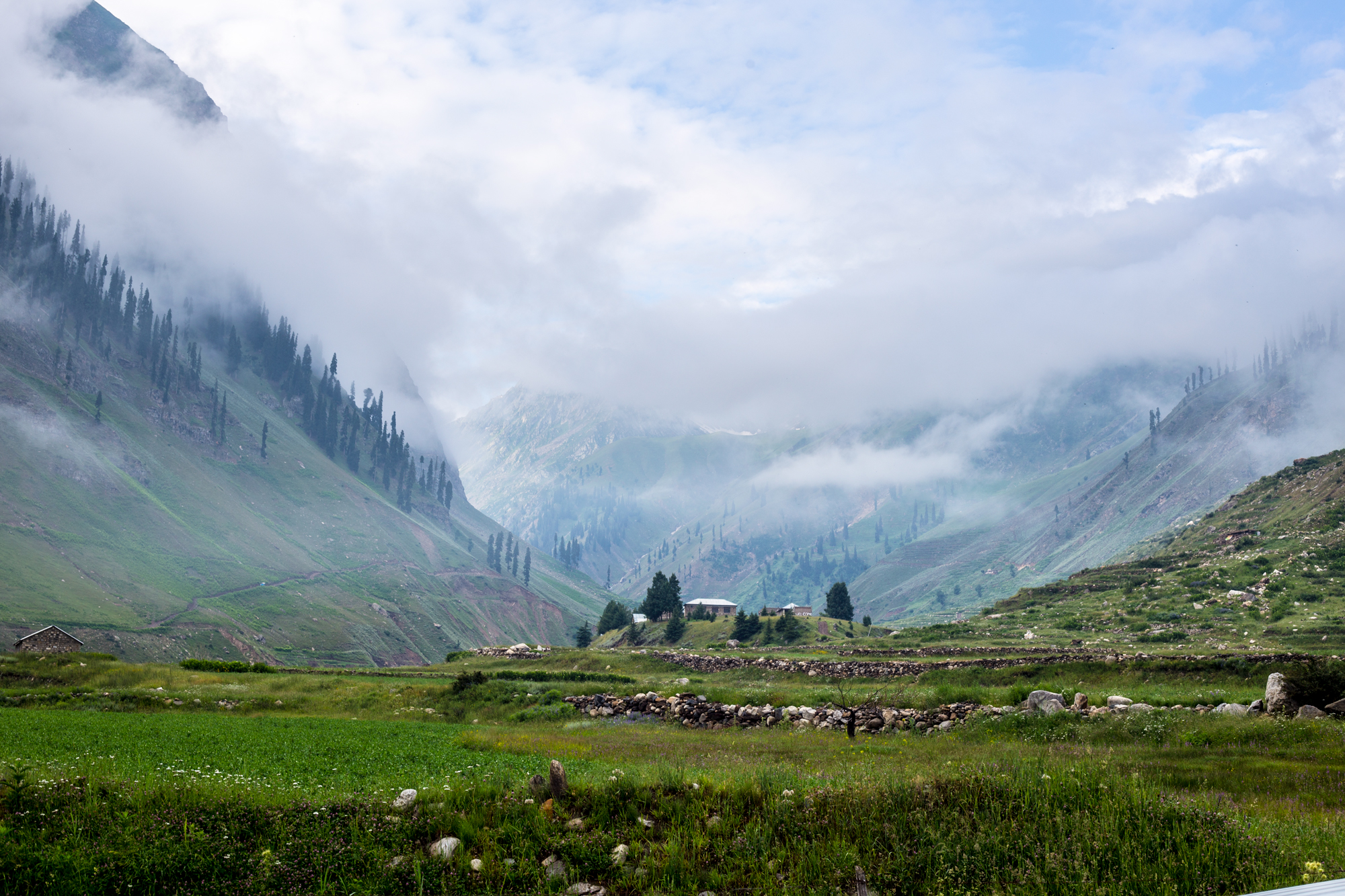
- View of Batakundi

- Location within Khyber Pakhtunkhwa
- Coordinates: 34.9316°N 73.7743°E
- Country: Pakistan
- Province: Khyber Pakhtunkhwa
- District: Mansehra
- Elevation: 2,624 m (8,609 ft)
- Time zone: UTC+05:00 (PKT)

Batakundi also spelt Battakundi (Northern Hindko: بٹہ کنڈی, Urdu: بٹہ کنڈی) is a tourist town located 15 km east of Naran in Mansehra District, Khyber Pakhtunkhwa, Pakistan. It is located within the Kaghan Valley.

== Location ==
Batakundi is located in Mansehra District, Khyber Pakhtunkhwa. While traveling towards Babusar, the first town after Naran is Batakundi. It is situated along the Karakoram Highway (KKH) and is a stop for jeeps. It is the first destination on the Mansehra-Naran-Jalkhad-Chilas Road to Babusar Top, and the path further leading to Lalazar and Gilgit-Baltistan.

== Tourism and activities ==
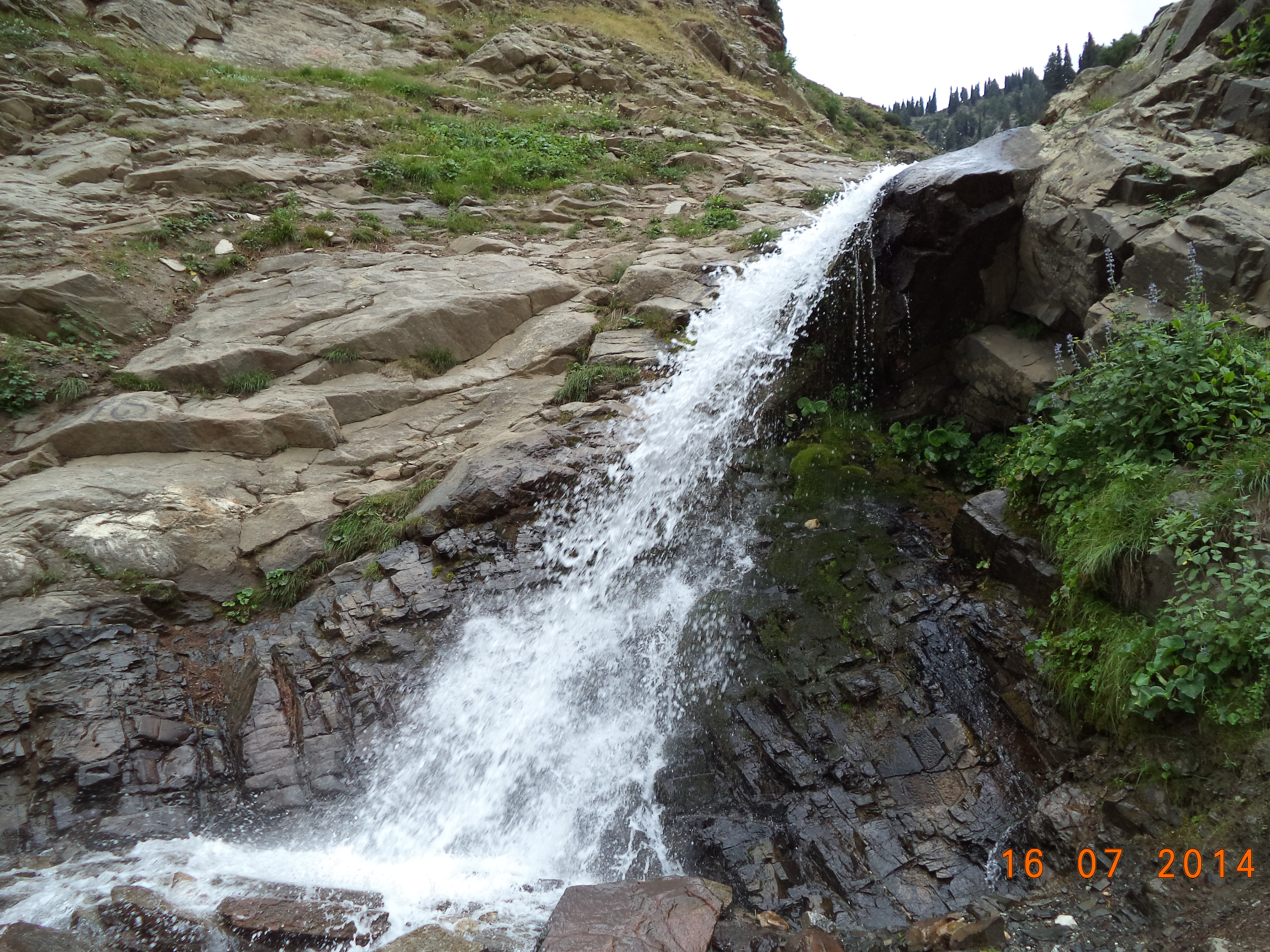
The Batakundi Waterfall

People often stay at hotels in Batakundi when they are planning their trip across Babusar Top. Batakundi is the last town in Kaghan Valley that stays open all year. Many people visit the town to see the Batakundi Waterfall. There are many hotels and restaurants in the town.

=== Batakundi Hydropower Project ===
In 2014, a hydropower project Batakundi Hydropower Project (HPP) planned on Kunhar River basin was initiated in the region by Pakhtunkhwa Energy Development Organization (PEDO) and later the feasibility report for the project were completed. The project was started by the recognition of the Sarhad Hydel Development Organization (SHYDO) (now called PEDO) with the help of the German Agency for Technical Cooperation (GTZ) under the analysis of Identification of Hydropower Potential in Kaghan Valley.

== People ==
Most people of Batakundi are Gujjars who are now Hindko speakers.
