= Thalichi =

Thalichi تھلیچی
- Town
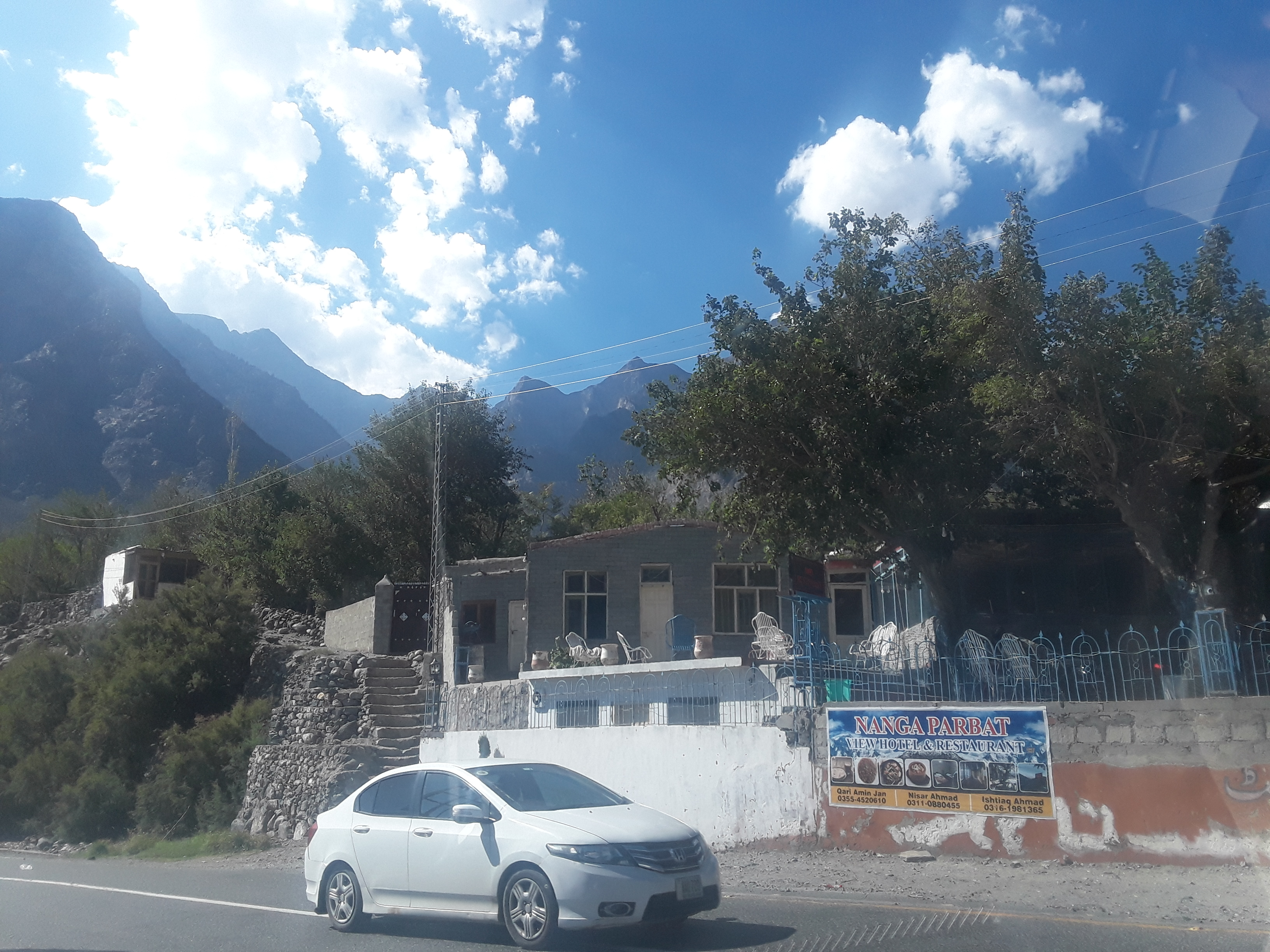
- Thalichi

- Location within Gilgit Baltistan Location within Pakistan
- Coordinates: 35.5785°N 74.61343°E
- Country: Pakistan
- Territories of Pakistan: Gilgit-Baltistan
- District: Diamer
- Elevation: 1,511 m (4,957 ft)
- Time zone: UTC+05:00 (PKT)

Thalichi is a small town located in Diamer district, Gilgit-Baltistan, in Pakistan. Thalichi is home to the famous Nanga Parbat.

== Nanga Parbat ==
Thalichi is located on the side of Nanga Parbat. Most people visit Nanga Parbat via Thalichi.

== Karakorum Highway ==
Thalichi is located on the Karakorum Highway or KKH. The town has been isolated many times due to landslides and flooding on the highway. Thalichi is along the route to Gilgit and Chilas.
