= Muhammad Bilal Khan =

Muhammad Bilal Khan may refer to:

- Bilal Khan (judge) (born 1949), Pakistani judge
- Muhammad Bilal Khan (journalist) (1997–2019), Pakistani journalist, assassinated in Islamabad
