= Diamir =

Diamir or Diamer may refer to:

- Diamir, the west face of Nanga Parbat
- Diamer District, in Gilgit–Baltistan, Pakistan
