= Muhammad Bilal Khan (journalist) =

Social media activist

- محمد بلال خان
- Born: 1 January 1997; Chilas, Gilgit-Baltistan, Pakistan
- Died: 16 June 2019 (aged 22); Islamabad, Pakistan
- Cause of death: Assassination
- Education: Gordon College Rawalpindi; International Islamic University
- Employer: Al Wesal TV

Muhammad Bilal Khan (Urdu: محمد بلال خان; 1 January 1997 – 16 June 2019) was a Pakistani journalist, writer, poet, social media activist and YouTuber. He was assassinated by an unknown person in Islamabad.

Bilal was born on 1 January 1997, in Chilas, Gilgit-Baltistan, Pakistan. He studied at the Gordon College Rawalpindi and was a student of Sharia at the International Islamic University Islamabad. He also worked for Al Wesal TV channel.

== Assassination ==
On 16 June 2019, Bilal Khan was stabbed by an unknown person in G 9/4 area of Islamabad. He was laid to rest in Abbottabad. Human Rights Minister Shireen Mazari condemned Khan's killing and assured that an investigation would be conducted.

More than 2 years after his murder on 20 September 2021, interior minister Sheikh Rasheed Ahmad revealed in a press conference that Bilal Khan's killer, Syed Abid Ali Shah, a resident of Kurram District, had been arrested with a dagger that was used in the murder.
