= Tatta Pani, Gilgit Baltistan =

Tatta Pani تتا پانی
- Village
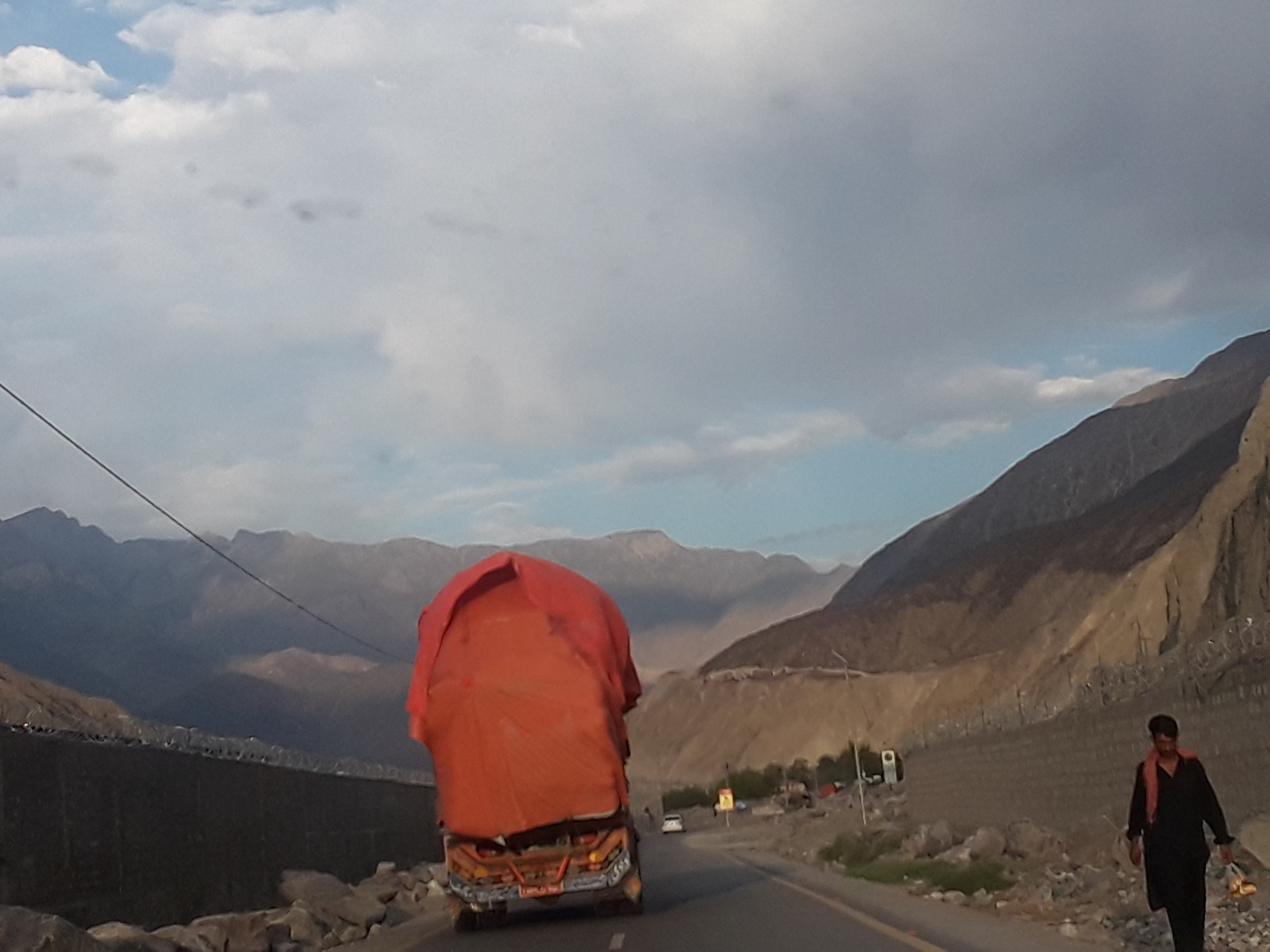
- Tatta Pani village

- Location within Gilgit Baltistan
- Coordinates: 35.47642216874622°N 74.55796285777811°E
- Country: Pakistan
- Territories of Pakistan: Gilgit-Baltistan
- District: Diamer
- Time zone: UTC+05:00 (PKT)

Tatta Pani (Shina: تاتُ اُوی/تتا اُوی, Urdu: تتا پانی) is a village of Diamer district, Gilgit-Baltistan, in Pakistan. It is notable due to the heavy landslides in the area within the Karakorum Highway.

== Etymology ==
The name Tatta Pani comes from the local Shina language and the national Urdu language. Tatta (or Tata) means hot in Shina while Pani means water in Urdu.

== Road and landsliding ==
The long and famous Karakorum Highway (KKH) passes through Tatta Pani, and this section of the KKH is called the "Tatta Pani Road". It is infamous for its destroyed roads and landslides in the area. There is currently another alternate road being built in the area. The bridge from Tatta Pani and Raikote is blocked for many reasons when landslides occur in the area.

== Demographics ==
There are around 36 people living in the urban side of the village while there are nearly 200 people living on the mountain area of Tatta Pani. The whole population is Chilasi Shina with the Chilas dialect of Shina being spoken the most.
