= N-15 National Highway =

Highway in Pakistan

National Highway 15
- قومی شاہراہ ١٥
- ۱۵ قومی شاہراہ

Route information
- Maintained by the National Highway Authority of Pakistan
- Length: 240 km (150 mi)

Major junctions
- North end: Chilas, Gilgit–Baltistan
- National Highway 35 (N–35)
- South end: Mansehra, Khyber Pakhtunkhwa

Location
- Country: Pakistan
- Major cities: Naran, KPK; Jalkhand, KPK

Highway system
- Roads in Pakistan

The N–15 or National Highway 15 (Urdu: ۱۵ قومی شاہراہ) is a 240-kilometre-long national highway in Pakistan. It connects the city of Mansehra in Khyber Pakhtunkhwa province to the city of Chilas in Gilgit-Baltistan through Kaghan Valley and Babusar Pass. The last 60 km section lies in Gilgit-Baltistan, rest being in Hazara Division. It is often used as a bypass for the Karakoram Highway (N–35) and is popular amongst tourists who visit Naran and surrounding region.

== See also ==
- Karakoram Highway
- Baltistan Highway
- Transportation in Pakistan
- National Highways of Pakistan
