= Al Wesal TV =

Saudi-based Sunni Islamic educational channel television network

Al Wesal TV is a Saudi-based Sunni Islamic educational channel television network. The production of this channel is based on the teachings of Quran-o-Sunnah. A team of Islamic scholars monitors the material presented on its programs. Each program of Wesal Urdu TV is previewed according to authentic references of Quran-o-Hadees. In 2015, it launched its Urdu language TV channel.

== Controversy ==
The channel is a topic of controversy. It was accused of preaching Salafism and spreading anti-Shia rhetoric throughout the network. In 2014, a channel's host praised suicide bombing that killed at least 47 Houthis, prompting Saudi Arabia's Culture and Information Minister to announce the closure of the channel.
