= Chilas =

City in Pakistani-administered Gilgit-Baltistan

Chilas چلاس
- City
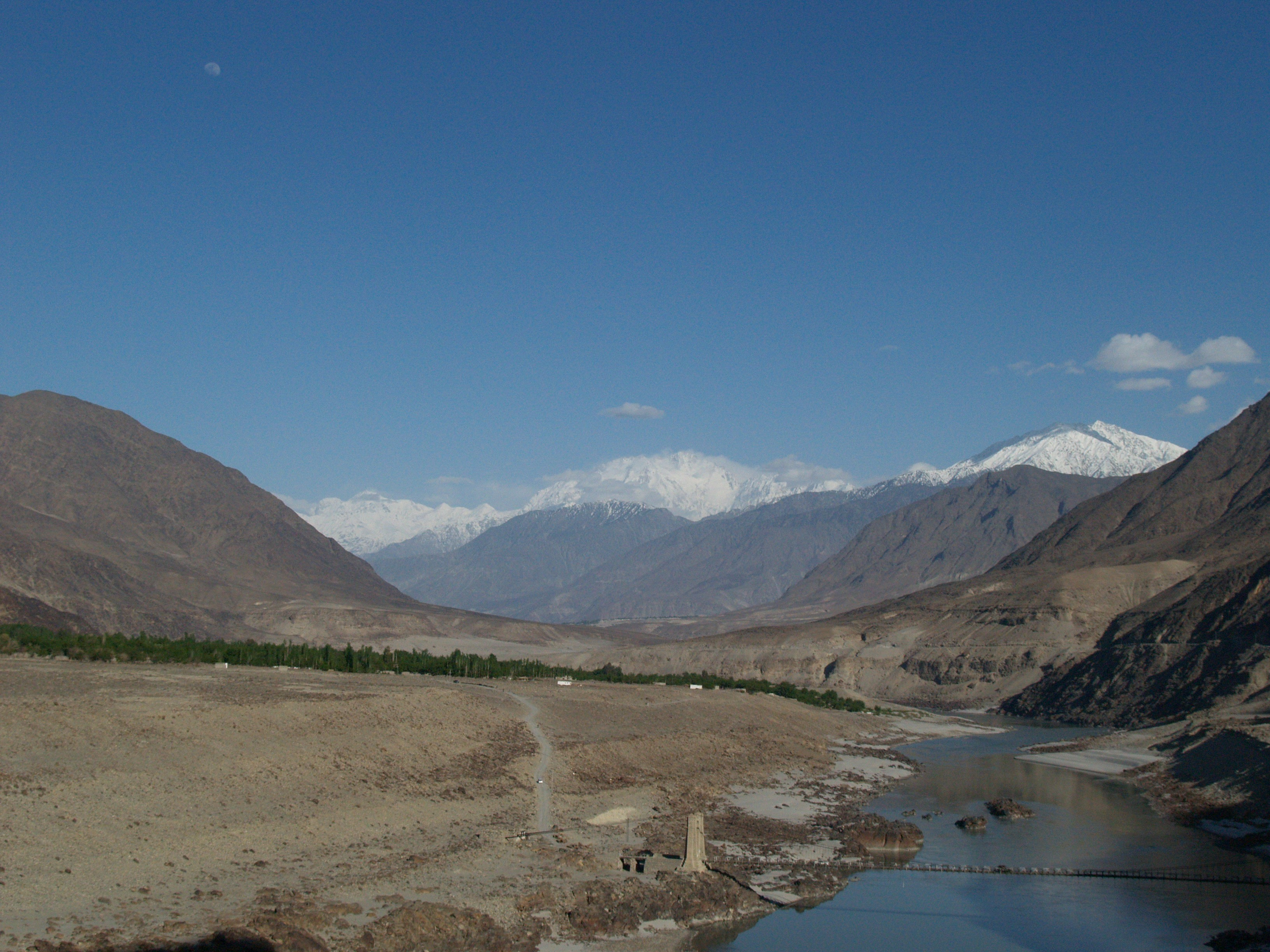
- The Indus River near Chilas

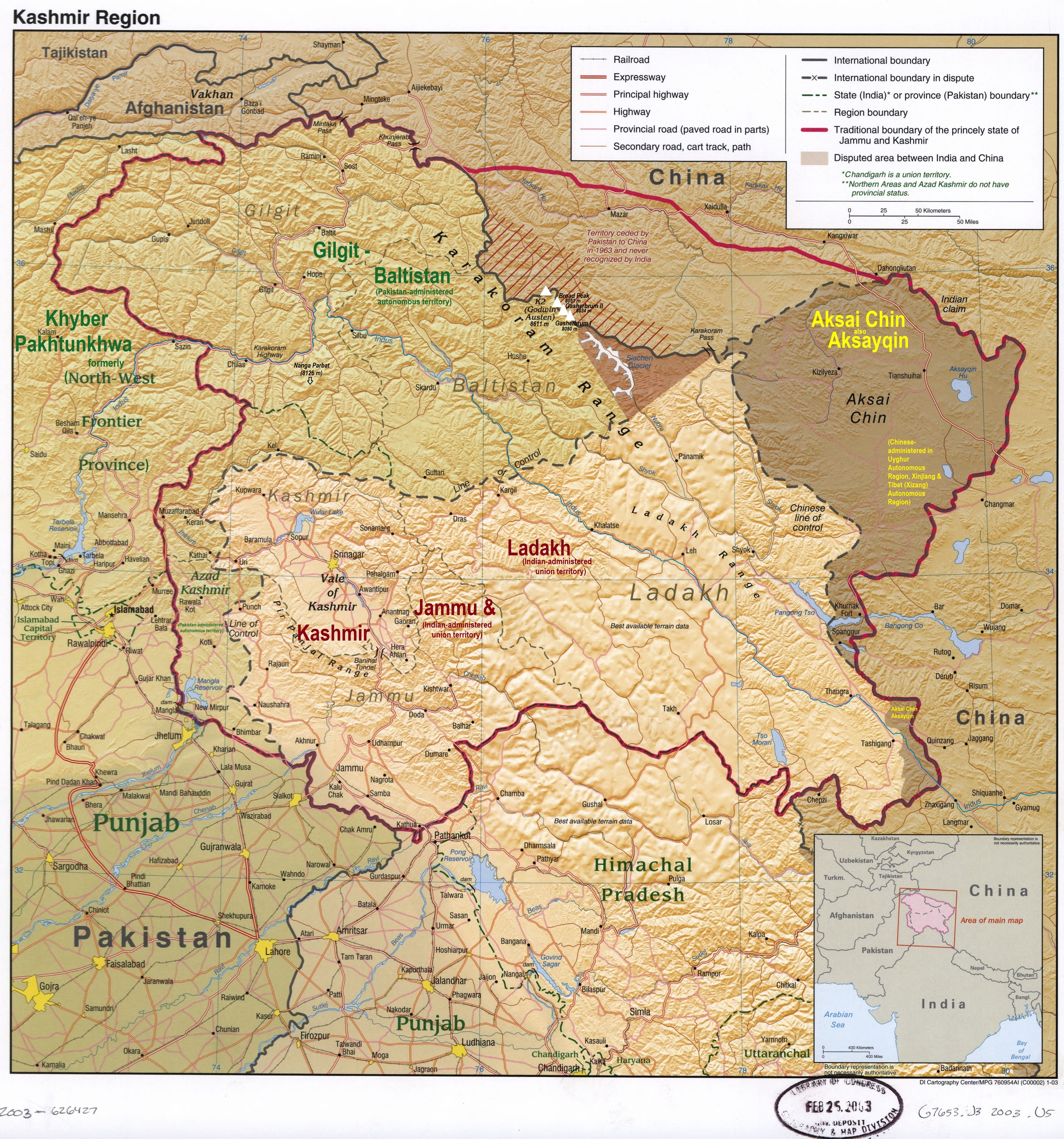
- A map showing Pakistan-administered Gilgit-Baltistan shaded in sage-green colour in the disputed Kashmir region

- Location of Chilas Chilas (Pakistan)
- Coordinates: 35°25′10″N 74°05′40″E
- Administering country: Pakistan
- territory: Gilgit-Baltistan
- District: Diamer District
- Elevation: 1,265 m (4,150 ft)

Population
  - Estimate (2026): 100,000

Languages
  - Official: Urdu, Shina
- Time zone: UTC+5 (PST)
- PIN: 14100 – 1xx

Chilas (Urdu: چلاس; pronounced [t͡ʃɪlɑːs]) is a city in Pakistan-administered territory of Gilgit-Baltistan in the disputed Kashmir region. It is the headquarters of Diamer District and the divisional capital of Diamer Division.

Chilas is located on the left bank of Indus River. The weather is hot and dry in the summer and cold and dry in the winter. It can be reached by the Karakoram Highway and also through the Kaghan Valley via the Babusar Pass. The Nanga Parbat National Park, containing Fairy Meadows and Nanga Parbat, the ninth highest peak in the world, is also located nearby it. Karakoram International University has a sub-campus in Chilas.

== History ==
=== Ancient petroglyphs ===
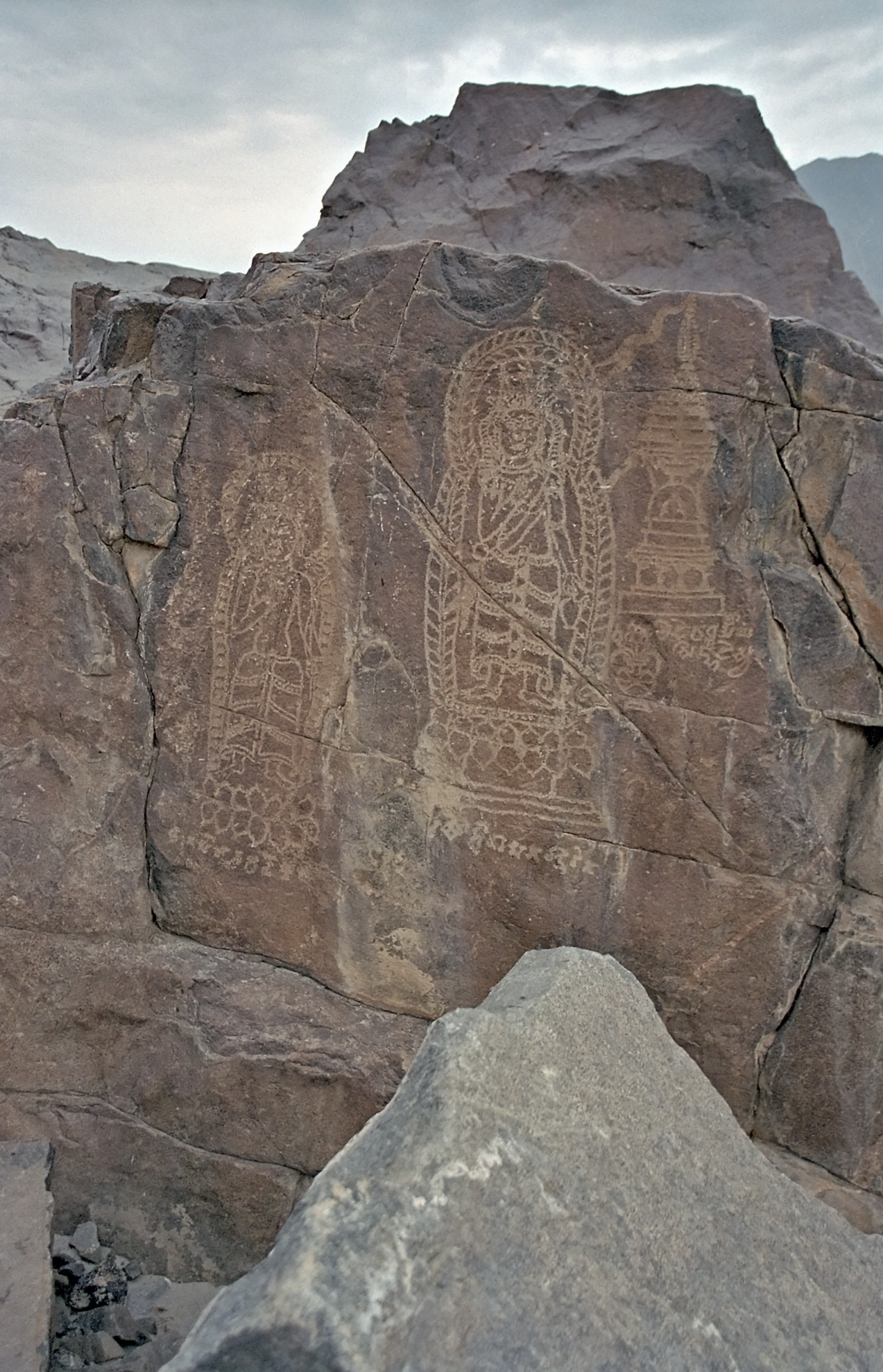
Buddhist petroglyphs near Chilas, depicting Bodhisattvas.

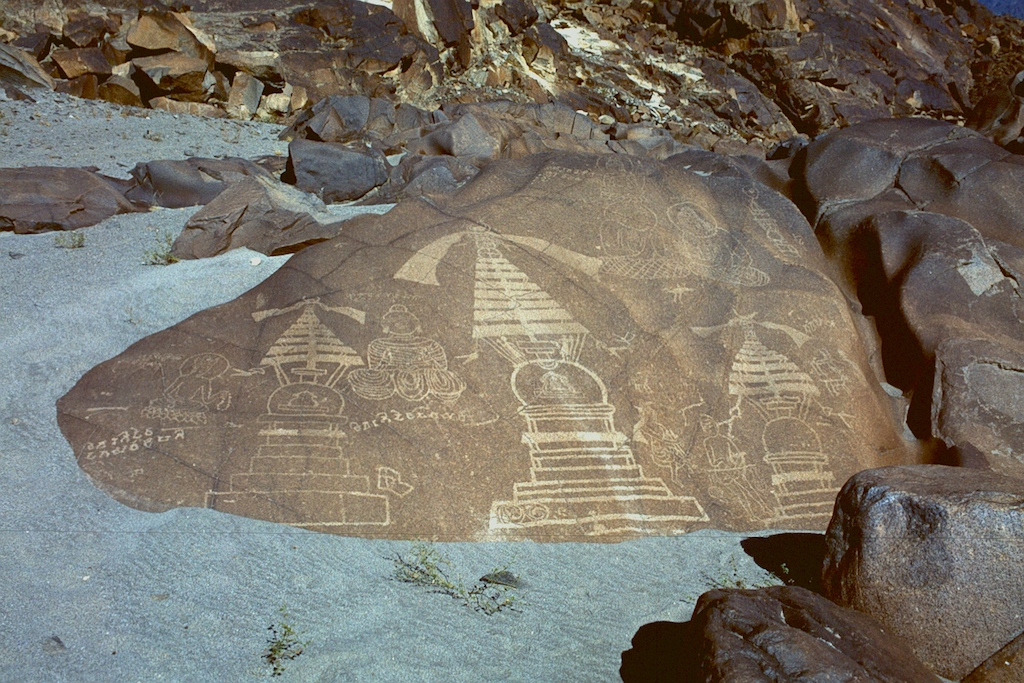
Shatial triptych with Sibi-Jataka, circa 300–350 CE based on Kharoshthi, Brahmi and Sogdian paleography.

More than 50,000 Buddhist petroglyphs and inscriptions line the Karakoram Highway in Gilgit-Baltistan, Pakistan. They are concentrated at ten major sites between Hunza and Shatial, but more have been found near Skardu and Shigar, where Karl Jettmar and Thewalt found the remains of a Buddhist monastery in 1984. The carvings were left by various invaders, traders and pilgrims who passed along the trade route, as well as by locals. The earliest date back to between 5000 and 1000 BC, showing single animals, triangular men and hunting scenes in which the animals sometimes are larger than the hunters. These carvings were pecked into the rocks with stone tools and are covered with a thick patina that proves their age. Later — mostly Buddhist — carvings were sometimes executed with a sharp chisel.

Jettmar tried to piece together the history of the area from various inscriptions and recorded his findings in "Rock carvings and Inscriptions in the Northern Areas of Pakistan" and the later "Between Gandhara and the Silk Roads: Rock carvings along the Karakoram Highway".

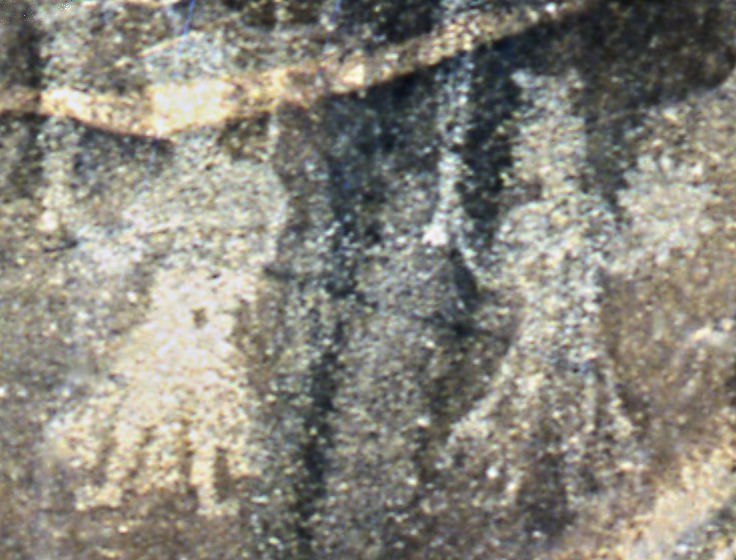
(Bala)rama and Krishna at Chilas. The Kharoshthi inscription nearby reads Rama [kri]ṣa. 1st century CE.

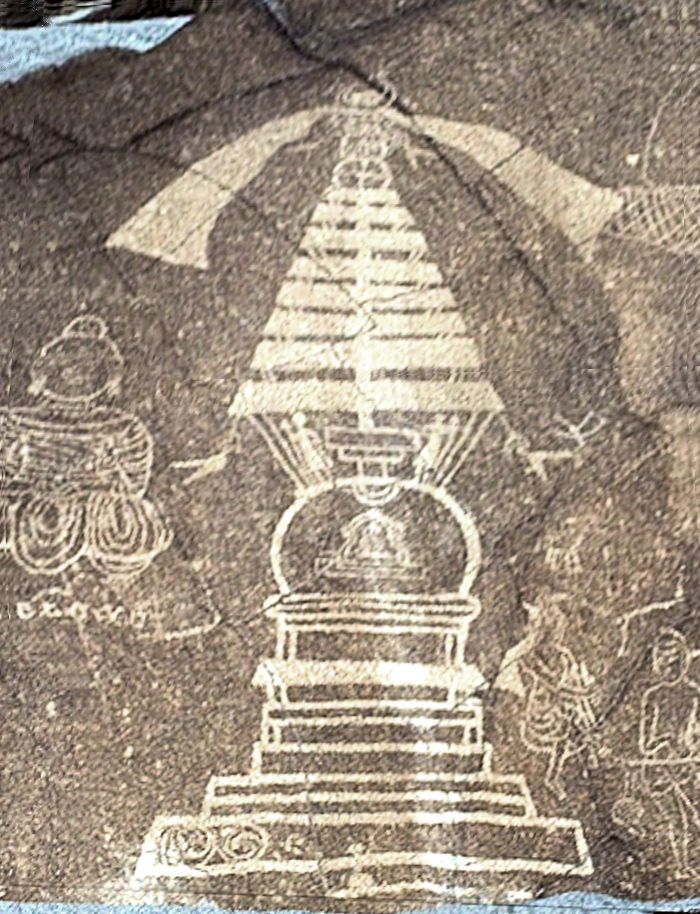
Buddhist stupa, circa 300–350 CE based on paleography.

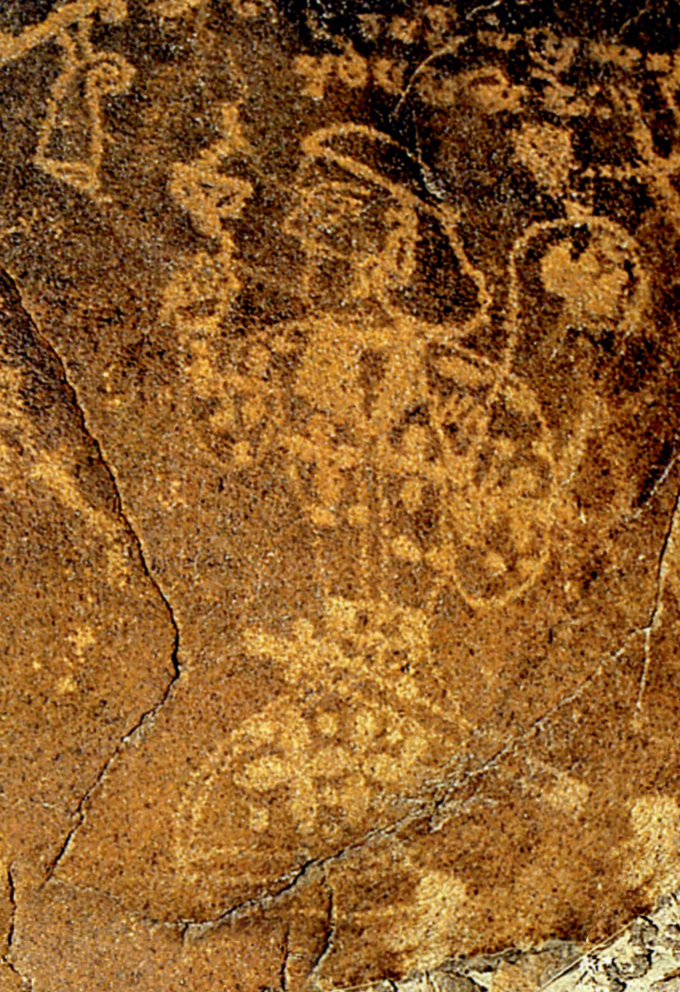
Donor in Central Asian dress with Sanskrit name venerating a stupa, Thalpan-Ziyarat, northern Pakistan, circa 7th century CE.

=== Later history ===
Chilas was historically a part of Yaghistan, and closely connected to the small independent republics in the Indus Kohistan. The Dogra rule was imposed on Chilas in 1852, but the Chilasis continued to enjoy internal independence. When British established Gilgit Agency in 1888 Chilas along with other tribal areas became its part. Even after British rule was imposed, the Indus Valley west of Chilas was a nest of tiny republics; there was one in almost every side valley, each loosely guided by a jirga (council of tribal elders) but effectively leaderless, all at war with one another and feuding internally. Though administratively lumped with Gilgit, Chilas and its neighbours were considered temperamentally more like Kohistani people, probably due to a similarly hostile environment and the same Sunni Muslim orthodoxy. Their ancestors were converted to Islam by a Sufi Muslim, Syed Noor Shah, from the Kaghan Valley. Syed Noor Shah, also known as Ghazi Baba, was the first man to preach Islam in Thak, and built the first mosque, which is still there. Ghazi Baba belonged to the Syed family of Kaghan. In Tangir and Darel, Islam came from Swat. After the 1947 Gilgit rebellion Chilas became a part of Pakistan, as did other Northern Areas, now renamed Gilgit-Baltistan.

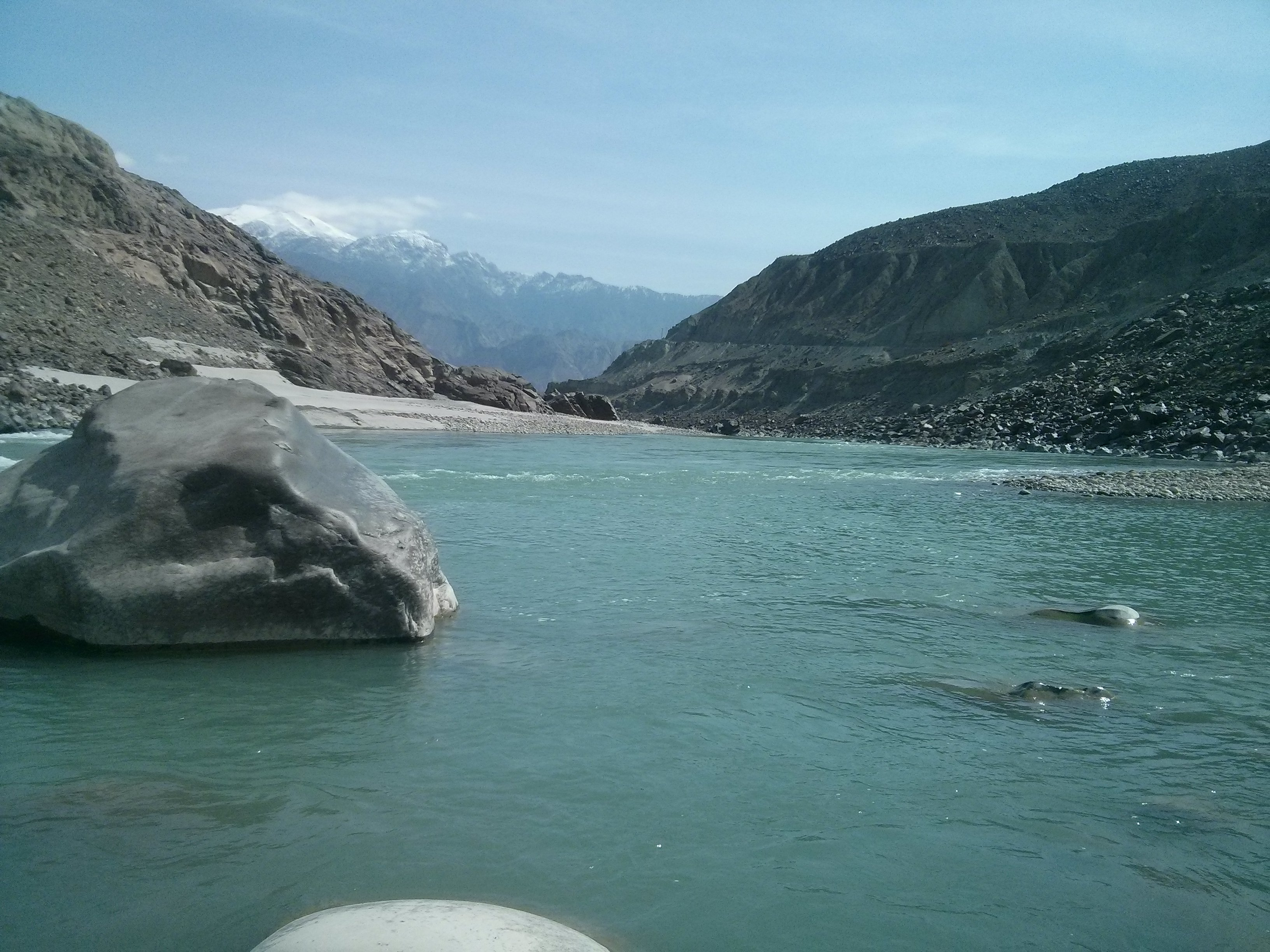
Indus River near Chilas

== Demographics ==
The Chilasis are Shina speakers, with some Pashtun settlers speaking Pashto. Urdu is also widely understood. The total population of Chilas was estimated to be over 100,000 in 2026, making it third largest city in Gilgit-Baltistan after Gilgit and Skardu.

== Climate ==
Chilas has a cold semi-arid climate (Köppen: BSk). The average temperature is 28.2 °C (82.8 °F) in July and 5.6 °C (42.1 °F) in January.

Climate data for Chilas, elevation: 1,176 m (3,858 ft), 1982–2012 normals
Month	Jan	Feb	Mar	Apr	May	Jun	Jul	Aug	Sep	Oct	Nov	Dec	Year
Mean daily maximum °C (°F)	10.2 (50.4)	13.2 (55.8)	18.5 (65.3)	23.9 (75.0)	29.0 (84.2)	34.0 (93.2)	34.7 (94.5)	33.5 (92.3)	30.6 (87.1)	25.3 (77.5)	19.3 (66.7)	12.5 (54.5)	23.7 (74.7)
Daily mean °C (°F)	5.6 (42.1)	8.2 (46.8)	13.0 (55.4)	18.0 (64.4)	22.3 (72.1)	26.9 (80.4)	28.2 (82.8)	27.4 (81.3)	23.9 (75.0)	18.3 (64.9)	12.5 (54.5)	7.3 (45.1)	17.6 (63.7)
Mean daily minimum °C (°F)	1.1 (34.0)	3.2 (37.8)	7.5 (45.5)	12.1 (53.8)	15.7 (60.3)	19.8 (67.6)	21.8 (71.2)	21.4 (70.5)	17.2 (63.0)	11.3 (52.3)	5.7 (42.3)	2.2 (36.0)	11.6 (52.9)
Average precipitation mm (inches)	17 (0.7)	25 (1.0)	42 (1.7)	46 (1.8)	35 (1.4)	10 (0.4)	17 (0.7)	19 (0.7)	8 (0.3)	18 (0.7)	6 (0.2)	11 (0.4)	254 (10)
Source: Climate-Data.org

== Transportation ==
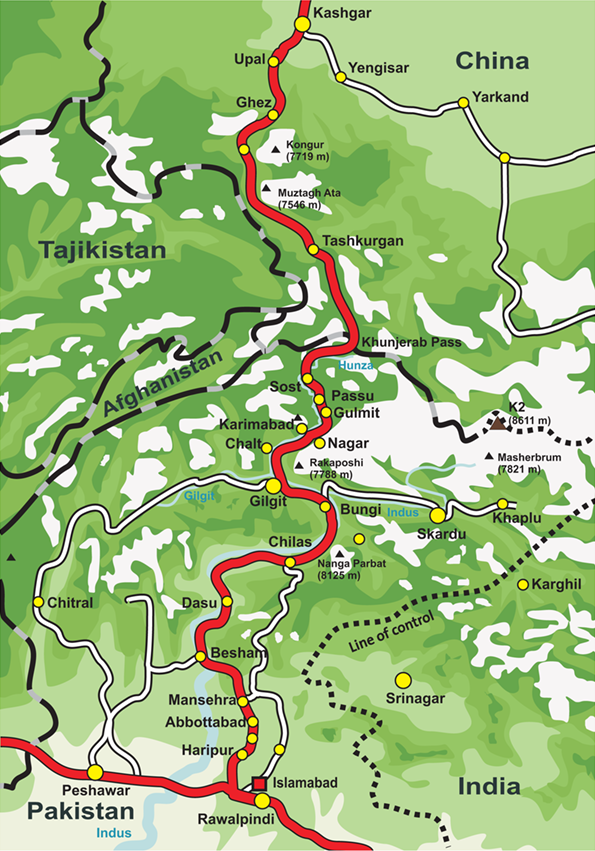
Overview map of the Karakoram Highway

Chilas is connected by the Karakoram Highway to Mansehra, Abbottabad and Haripur in Hazara Division. Northwards Karakoram Highway links it to Gilgit, the capital of the region. Further north it connects Chilas to the cities of Tashkurgan and Kashgar in Xinjiang, China, via Gilgit, Aliabad, Sust, and the Khunjerab Pass. The N-15 National Highway links Chilas to Islamabad via Babusar Pass and Kaghan Valley in Khyber Pakhtunkhwa. Chilas Airfield is located near the city and was under (primarily military) use until late 20th century.

== Notable people ==
- Muhammad Bilal Khan, journalist (1997 – 2019)

== See also ==
- Parri Bangla
