= Babusar Pass =

Mountain pass in northern Pakistan

- درہ بابوسر
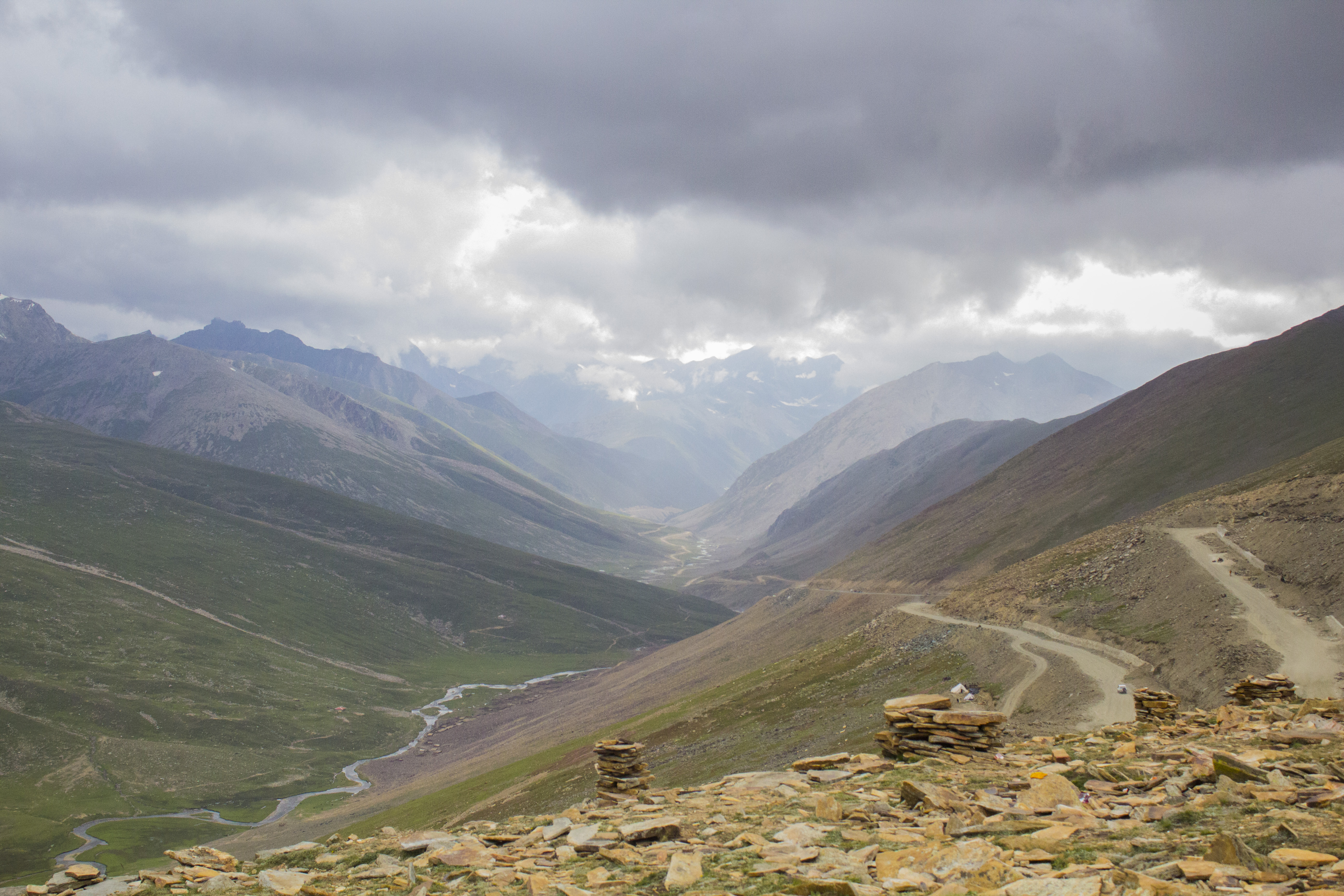

- Location within Gilgit Baltistan Location within Pakistan
- Elevation: 4,173 metres (13,691 ft)
- Traversed by: N-15 National Highway

Third Approach
- Location: Diamer District, Gilgit-Baltistan, Pakistan
- Coordinates: 35°8′46.46″N 74°2′53.41″E

Babusar Pass (Urdu: درہ بابوسر, romanized: Dara-ē-Bābūsar), also known as Babusar Top, is a mountain pass in northern Pakistan connecting Khyber Pakhtunkhwa with Gilgit-Baltistan. It is located at an altitude of 4,173 metres (13,691 ft) at the northern end of the Kaghan Valley in Mansehra District, connecting it with Chilas in Diamer District through the Karakoram Highway (KKH).

Babusar Pass is the highest point in Kaghan Valley that can be easily accessed by cars. It is one of the most dangerous routes in Pakistan. Every year, a number of casualties in road accidents are reported from this mountainous terrain. The most common reason for accidents is brake failure of vehicles in this steep landscape due to inexperience.

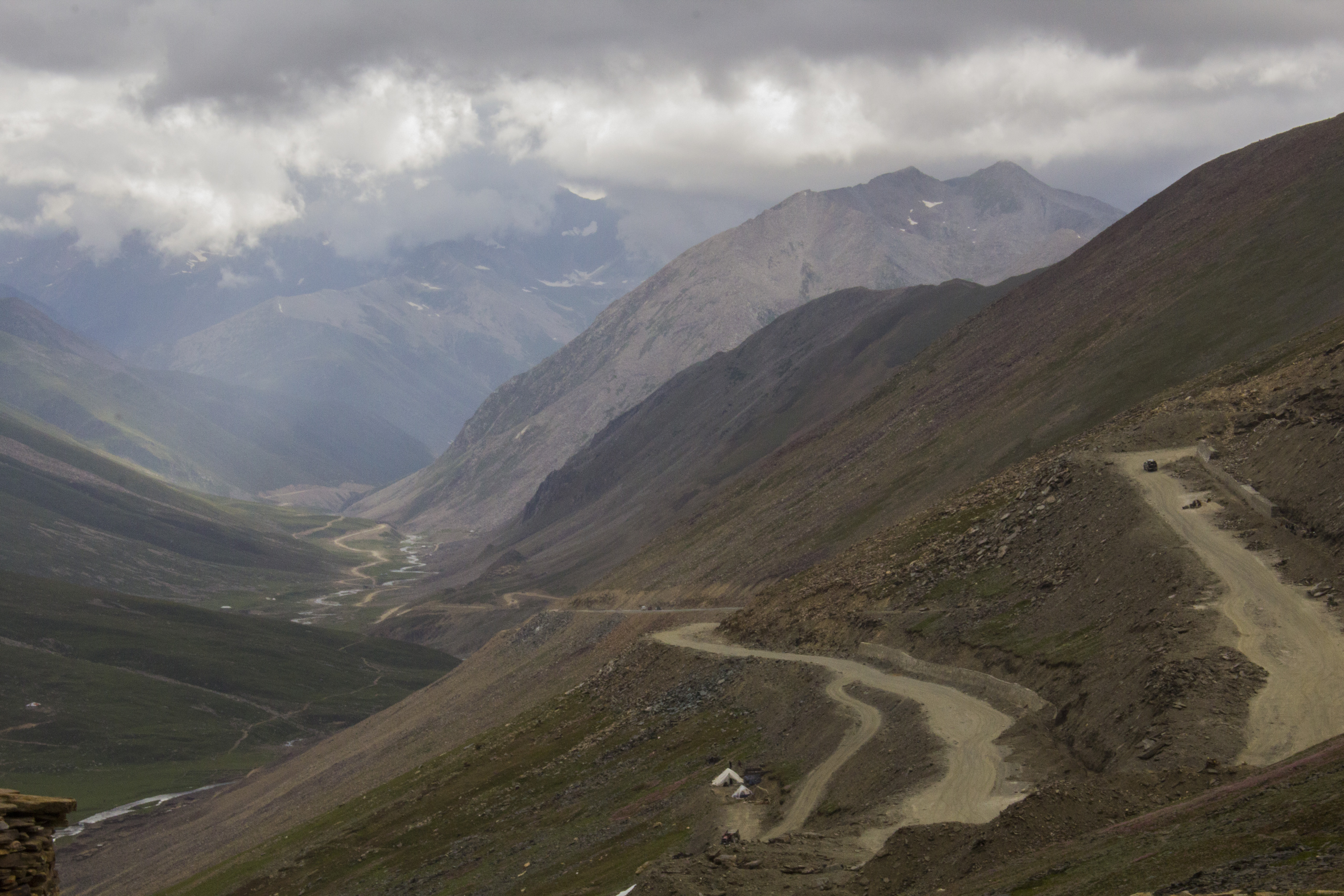
View from Babusar Top

== Climate ==
The Kaghan Valley, with its summers from May to September, typically experiences a maximum temperature of 11°C (52°F) in May, with a minimum temperature of 3°C (37°F). From mid-July until the end of September, the road north of Naran remains accessible all the way to the Babusar Pass. However, movement is limited during the monsoon and winter seasons. The Kaghan area is well connected by road to Islamabad and Peshawar.

During winter, the pass often closes due to heavy snowfall and harsh conditions. Instead, travellers typically use the Karakoram Highway to access the northern regions of the country.

== Geography ==
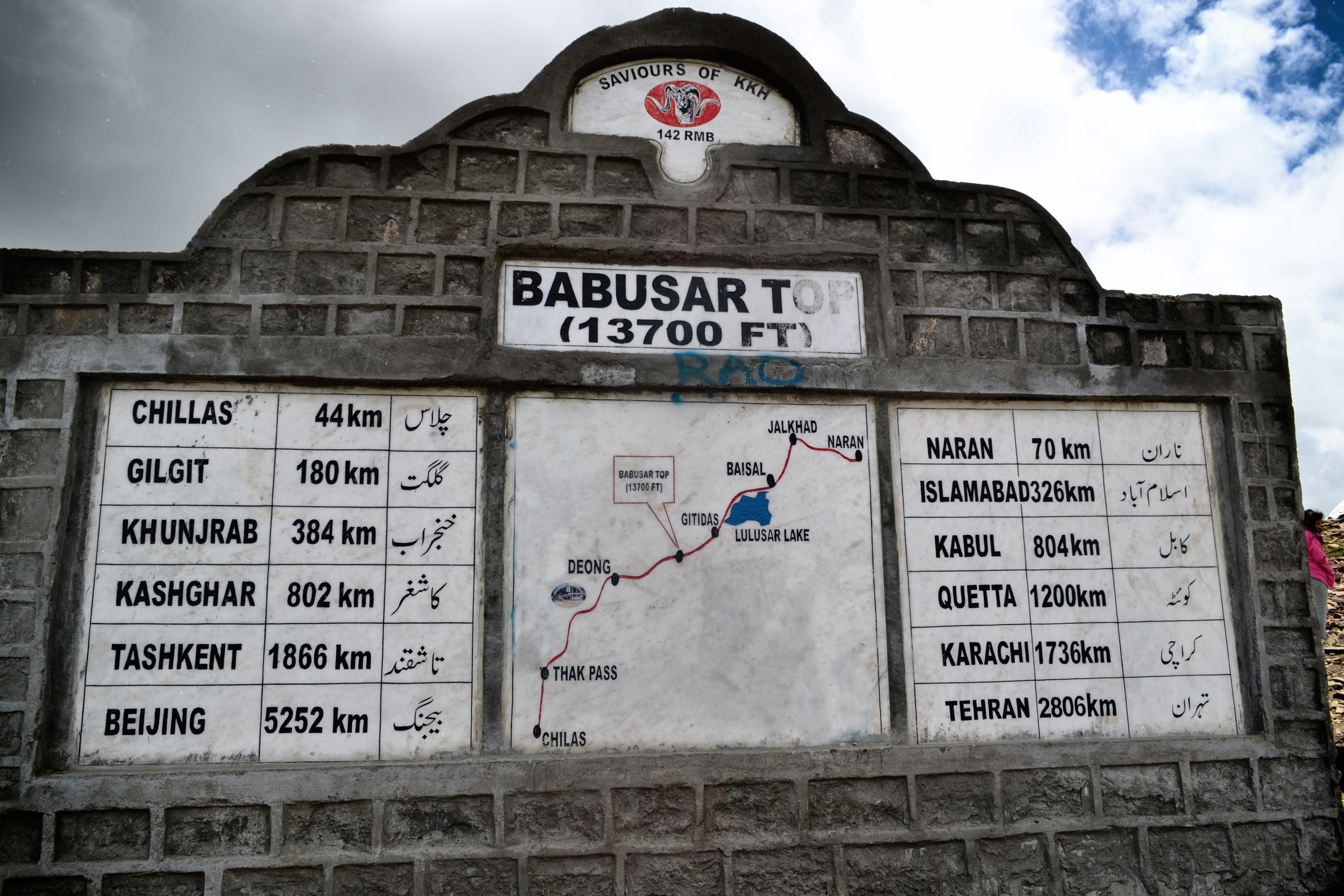
A monument showing brief information on the route and distances from Babusar Top to various locations.

The mountain ranges that enter the Mansehra District from Kashmir are the offshoots of the great Himalayan system. In the Kaghan Valley, the mountain system is the highest in the area, including the Babusar Top. This range flanks the right bank of the Kunhar River, and contains a peak called Malika Parbat, which is over 17,000 feet high and the highest in the valley.

On the mountains, the grasslands nomads migrate during the summer for grazing by their sheep, goats, and other animals. On the north side, there are mountains that are extensions of the same mountain system as the Kaghan Mountains. This range diverges from the eastern side at Musa ka Musalla, a peak at an elevation of around 13,500 feet, which skirts the north end of the Bhogarmang and Konsh valleys and sends down a spur to divide the two. Here also, like Kaghan, thick forests are naturally present, especially on the higher slopes. However, due to extensive exploitation, thick forests are now usually found in unapproachable areas.

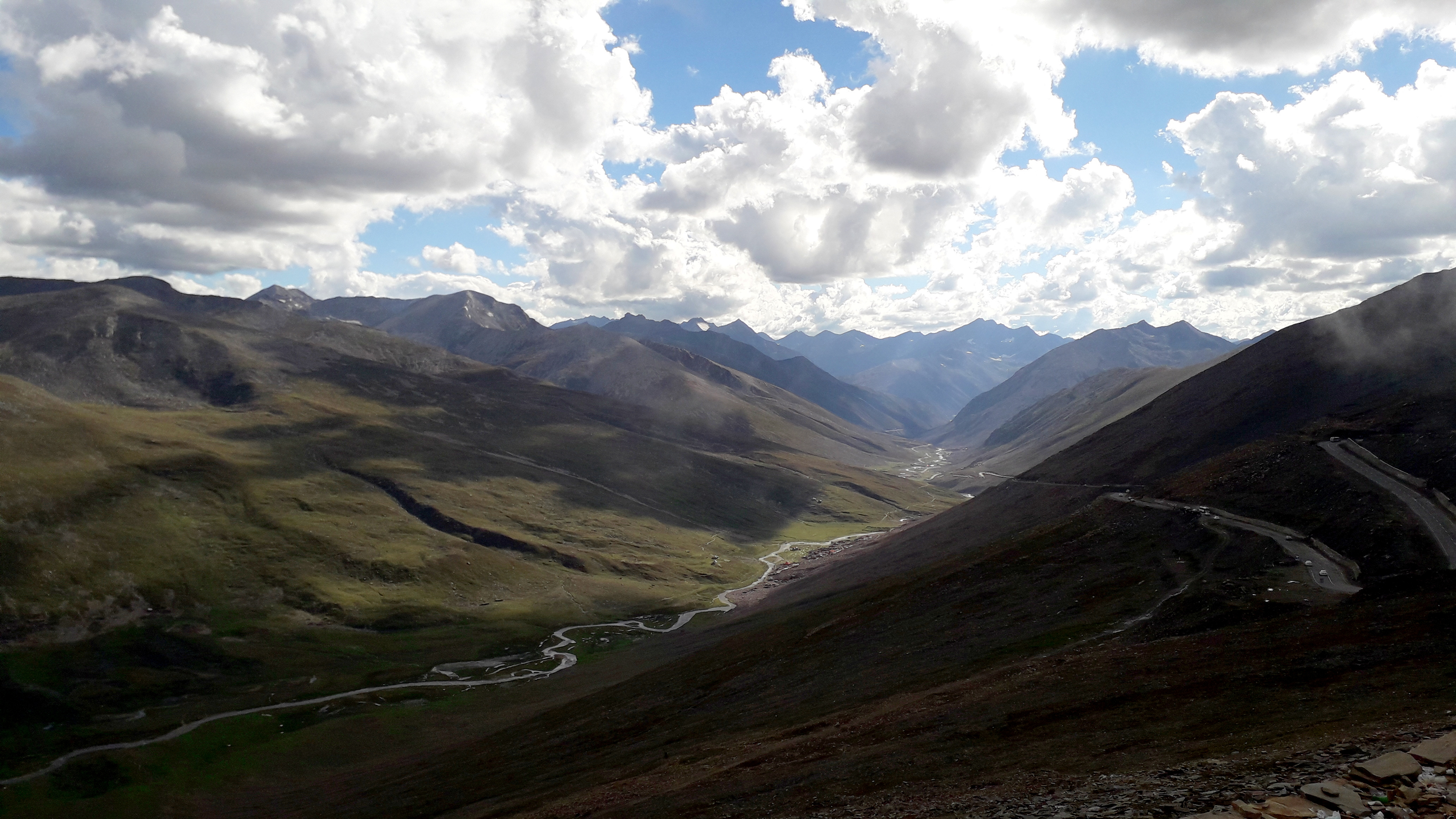
Majestic view from Babusar Top

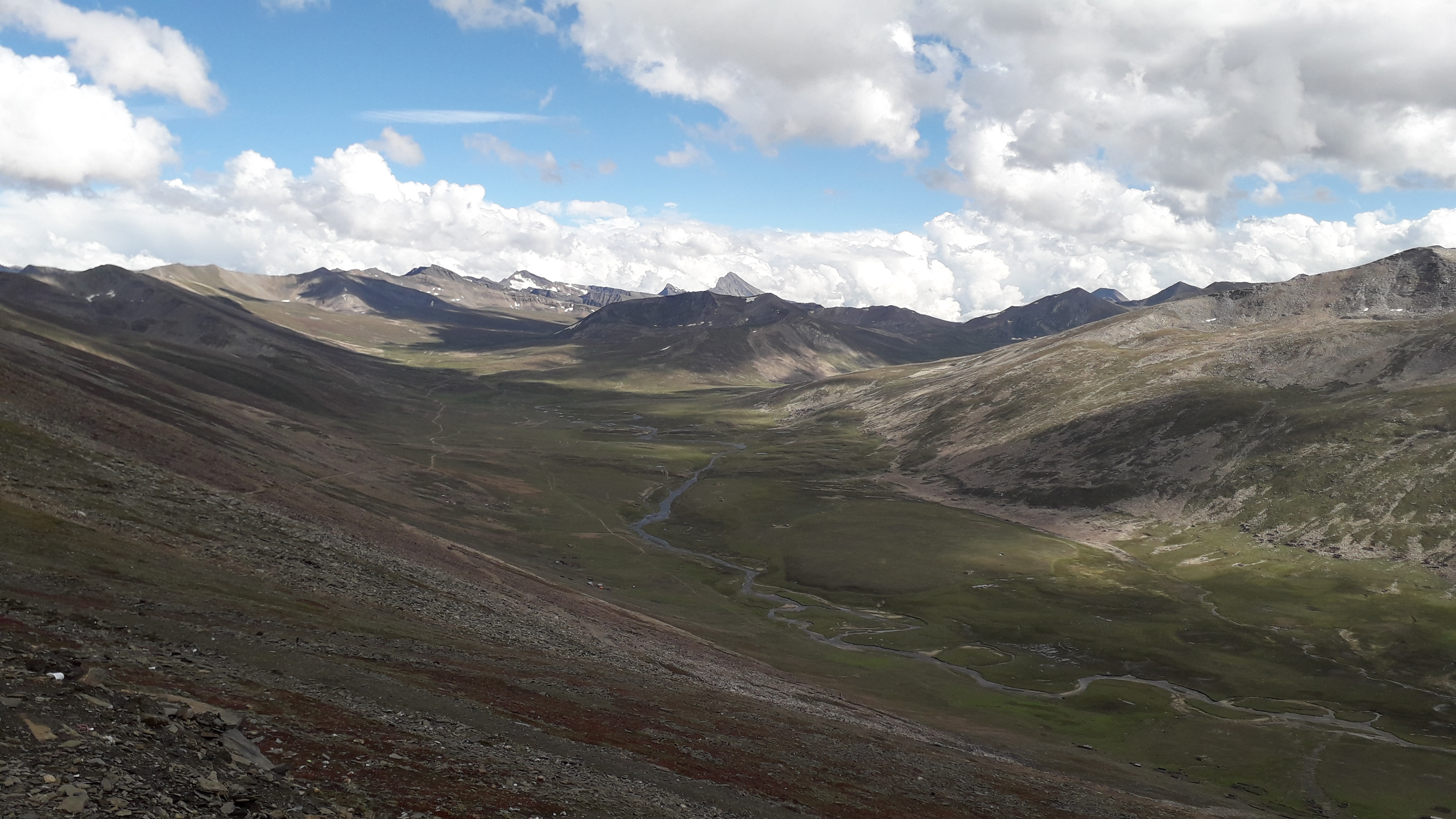
Babusar Road is open only from April to September every year.

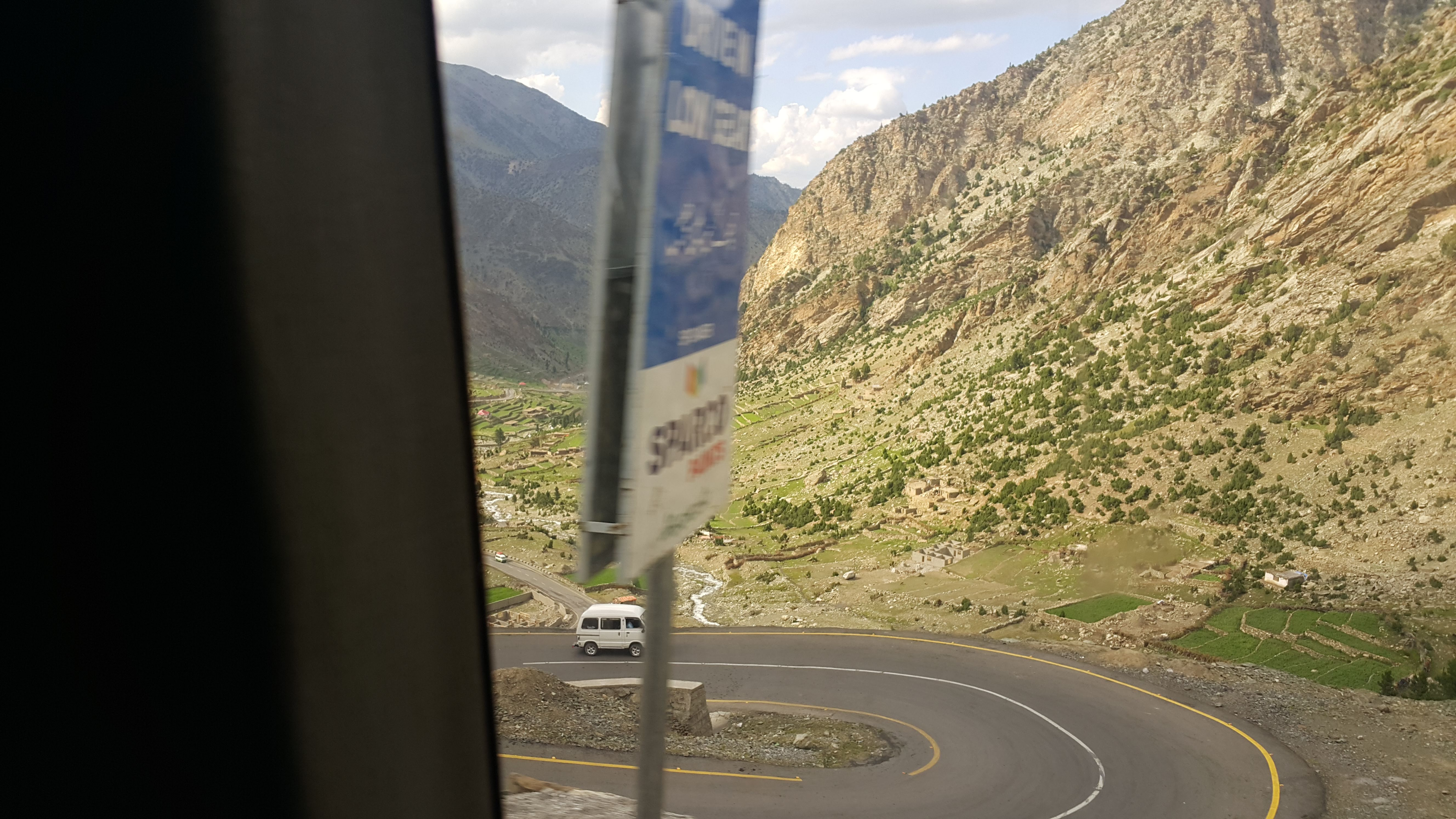
National Highway N-15 has abrupt direction changes which is a challenge for drivers who use this route to reach Gilgit

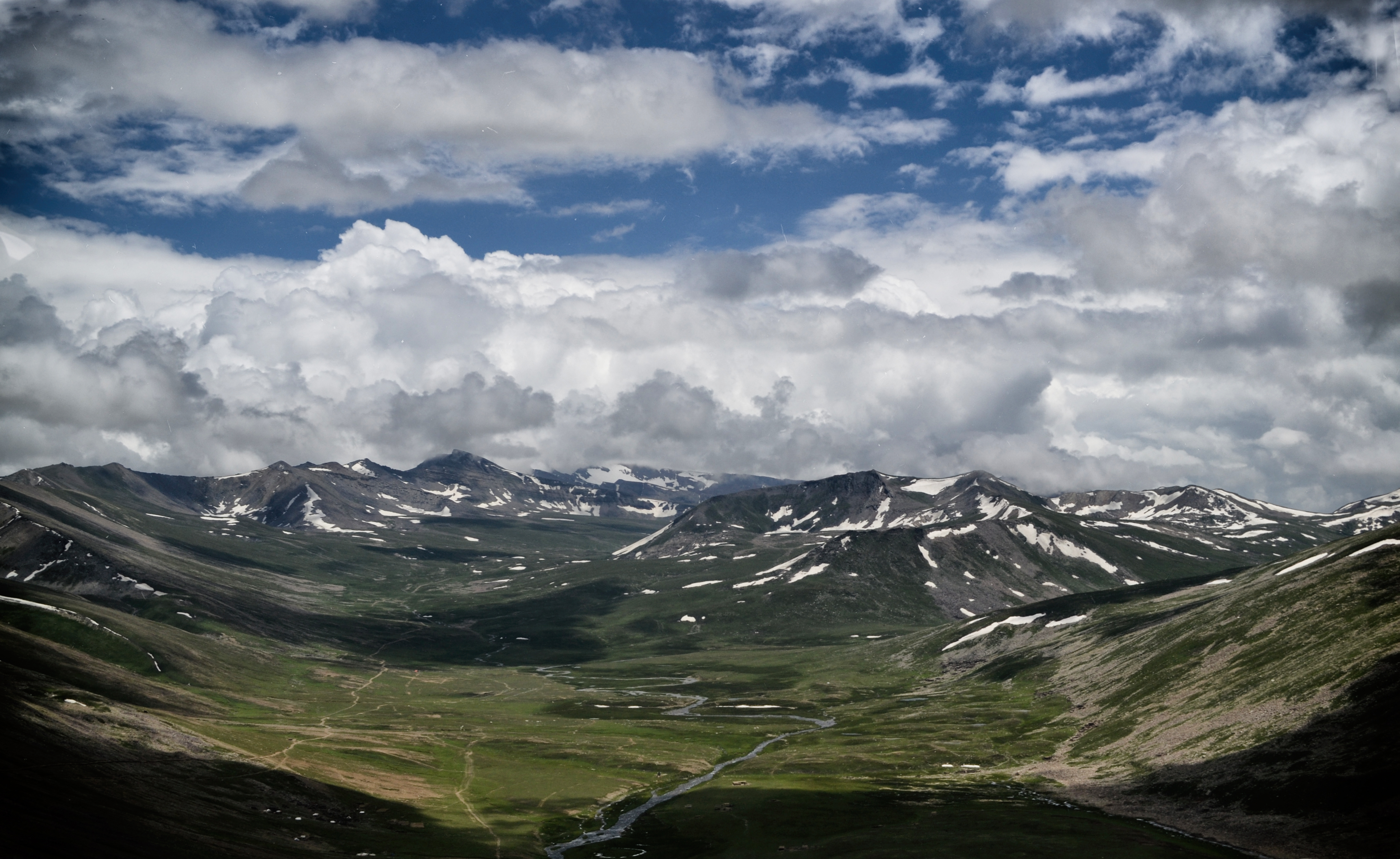
View of Babusar Valley from the top of Babusar Pass.

== See also ==
- Khunjerab Pass
- Burzil Pass
- Khyber Pass
- Sazeen
