= Parri Bangla =

Parri Bangla پڑی بنگلہ
- Village
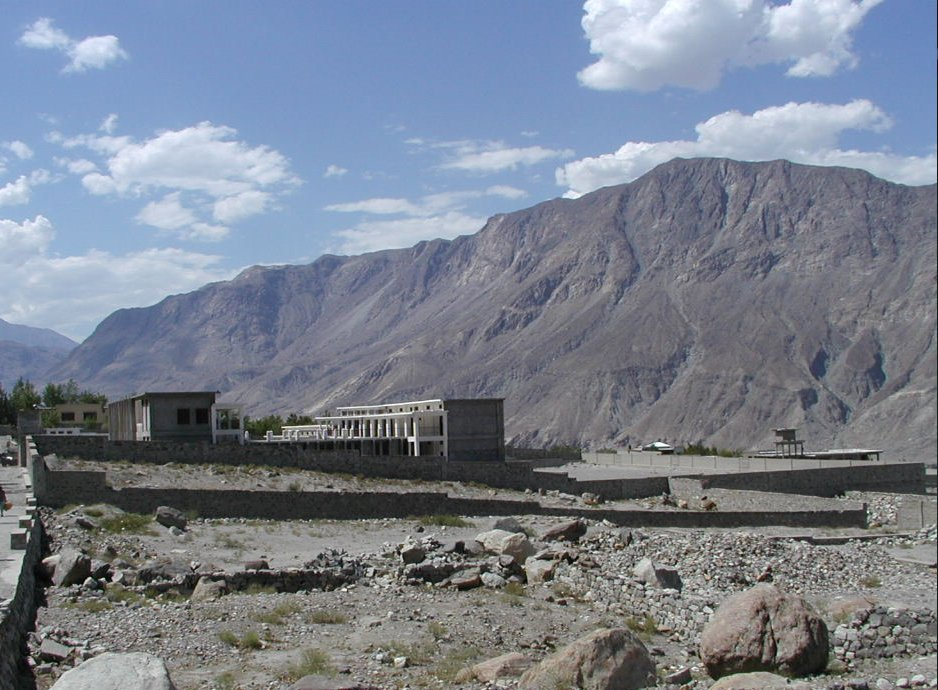

- Location within Gilgit Baltistan
- Coordinates: 35°48′39″N 74°33′44″E
- Country: Pakistan
- Region: Gilgit-Baltistan
- Division: Gilgit Division
- District: Gilgit District
- Established: 1895

Government
  - District Chairman: Parri Bangla Union Council (5 Year Term) Ex-Members are Shireen Khan lone, Shahnawaz Khan lone ( land lord of Parri), Nusrat Alam lone.
- Elevation: 150 m (490 ft)
- Population (2013): 6,500
- Time zone: UTC+5 (PST)
- Area code: 05811
- Website: Parri Bangla information

Parri Bangla (Urdu: پڑی بنگلہ) is a village situated 28 km from Gilgit city and 23 km from Juglot town. Parri Bangla was established in 1885 by the residents of Juglot Sai and Balas. The first development was a Dak Bangla on the Silk Route of the village during British colonial rule. Locally, Dak Bangla means "Post House". A water channel from Chakarkot Nala was constructed in 1931 by the locals of the village.

The population of Parri Bangla consists of Kashmiris, Sheens, Yashkuns, Dom, Kamin, Akhars etc.
