= Diamer District =

District of Gilgit–Baltistan administered by Pakistan

Diamer District ضلع دیامر
- District of Gilgit–Baltistan administered by Pakistan
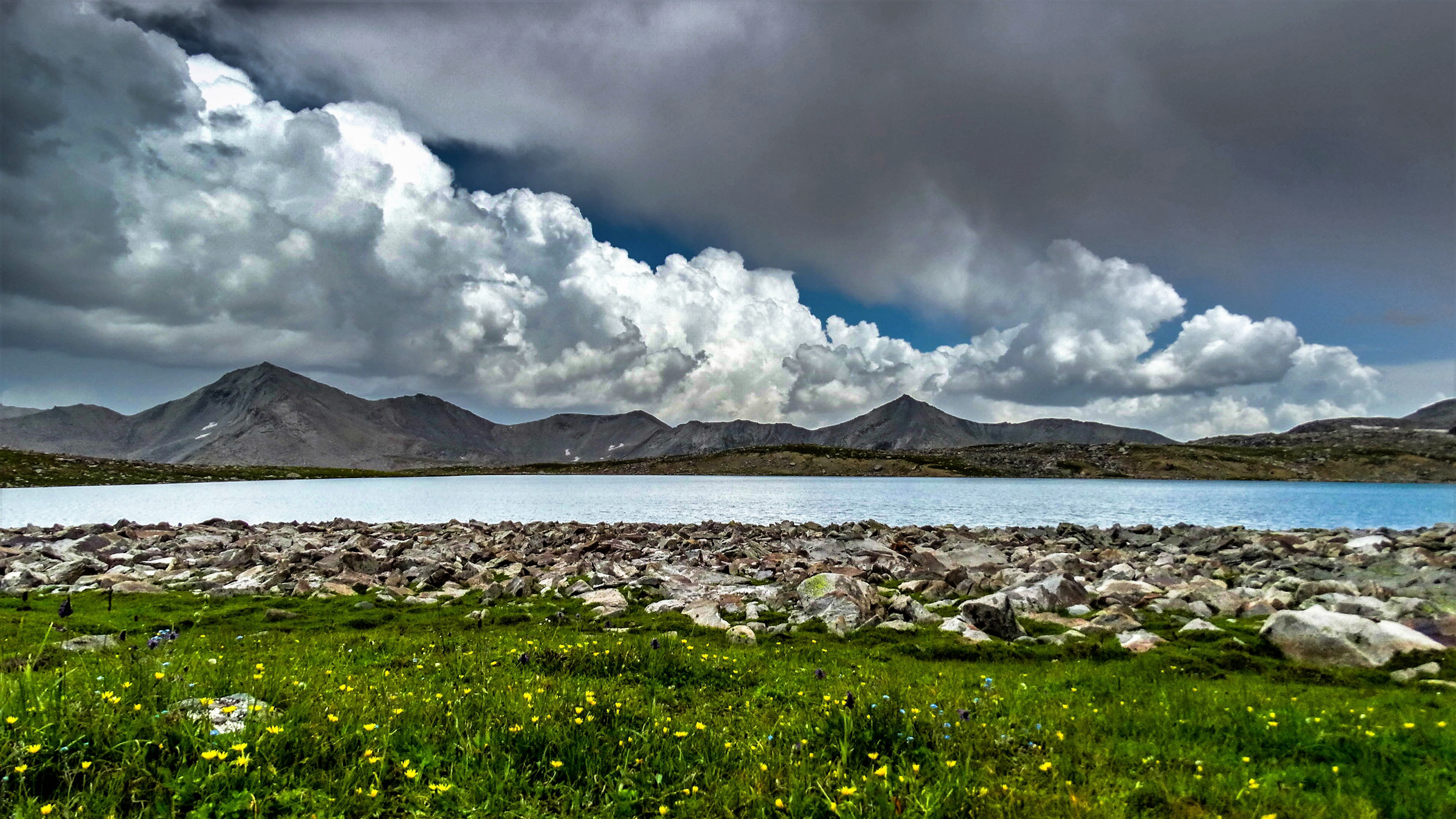

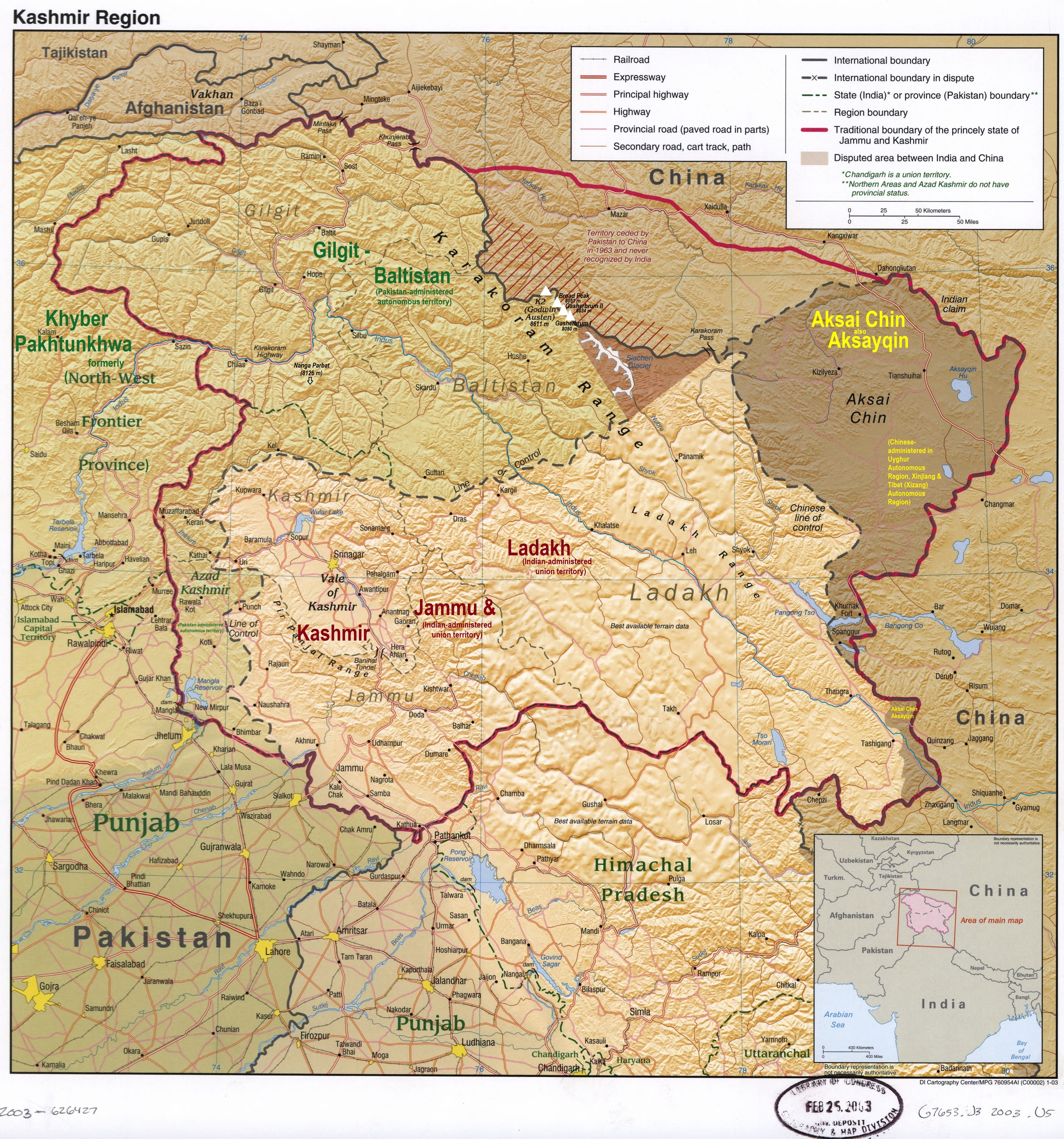
- A map showing Pakistani-administered Gilgit-Baltistan (shaded in sage green) in the disputed Kashmir region
- Interactive map of Diamer District
- Coordinates: 35°26′5.78″N 73°56′31.59″E
- Administering country: Pakistan
- Territory: Gilgit-Baltistan
- Headquarters: Chilas

Government
  - Type: District Administration
  - Deputy Commissioner: N/A
  - District Police Officer: N/A
  - District Health Officer: N/A

Area
  - Total: 7,234 km^{2} (2,793 sq mi)

Population (2023)
  - Total: 337,329
  - Density: 46.63/km^{2} (120.8/sq mi)
- Number of tehsils: 2

Diamer District (Urdu: ضلع دیامر), also spelled Diamir District, is a district of the Pakistan-administered territory of Gilgit–Baltistan in the disputed Kashmir region. The headquarters of the district is the town of Chilas.

== Geography ==
Diamer District within Gilgit−Baltistan

The district is bounded on the north by the Tangir and the Gilgit districts, on the east by the Astore District, on the south by the Mansehra district of Pakistan's Khyber Pakhtunkhwa Province and the Neelum District of Azad Kashmir, and on the west by the Upper Kohistan District of Khyber Pakhtunkhwa Province. The Karakoram Highway passes through Diamer District. 23% of the district consists of alpine pastures, with over 53% of remaining area being barren or permanently snow covered.

== History ==
Thalpan, located opposite to the Chilas town, bears the most abundant collection of rock-art in Pakistan — the Pakistan-German Archaeological Mission has published about them in six dedicated volumes and traced them to Greco-Buddhist antiquity. (Note: The proposed construction of Basha-Diamer Dam is expected to inundate over 37,000 carvings.) Buddhist Stupas and anthropomorphic Buddhas remain the most common subject of rock-carvings in and around Chilas.

Karl Jettmar suggests that Chilas might have had been a Buddhist sanctuary while Harald Hauptmann hypothesizes Thalpan to be the "Talilo" of Chinese sources; however, in absence of excavations, such claims remain in the realm of speculations.

During the British Raj, the area was known as Chilas and regarded as a tribal area, a subsidiary of the princely state of Jammu and Kashmir. Its original name was apparently Shiltās.

The region was brought under the control of the Maharaja of Jammu and Kashmir in 1851, and an agent of the Kashmir durbar was stationed there. In 1893, Chilas was taken over by the British-run Gilgit Agency. An Assistant Political Agent of the Agency was stationed in Chilas town. The Raja was soon deposed and Chilas functioned as a 'republican community' under the aegis of jirga, a body of local landowning men.

Prior to 2019, the Darel District and the Tangir District were part of the Diamer District. They were subsequently announced to have been elevated to district status, although they have not been established as of 2024. The jirga continues to play a significant role in governance.

== Demographics ==
Diamer is ethnically very diverse. Ethni groups like Shina, Youshkon, Gujjar, Dulasgar and Kashmiri are mainly found in Diamer district. Shina language is spoken by almost all ethnic groups with some additional languages like Shina, Gujari, Kashmiri and Dulasgariya.

In Diamer District the majority of the population adheres to Shia Islam with a significant population of Sunni Islam, predominantly of the Deobandi school of thought, having been introduced to the region by Pashtun-preachers.

== Transportation ==
Before the Karakoram Highway was opened in 1978, the only road from the south to the town of Gilgit was a rough track north from Balakot to the Babusar Pass (via Kaghan, Naran, Besal, and Gittidas) and further north from Babusar Gah to Chilas. The road up to Besal is better than it was previously, and the road from Besal to the Babusar Pass is good, having been recently metaled.

== See also ==
- Districts of Gilgit–Baltistan

== Bibliography ==
- Chohan, Amar Singh (1997), Gilgit Agency 1877-1935 (Second Reprint ed.), Atlantic Publishers & Dist, ISBN 978-81-7156-146-9 – via archive.org
