= Naran (town) =

Town in Khyber Pakhtunkhwa, Pakistan

Naran ناران
- Town
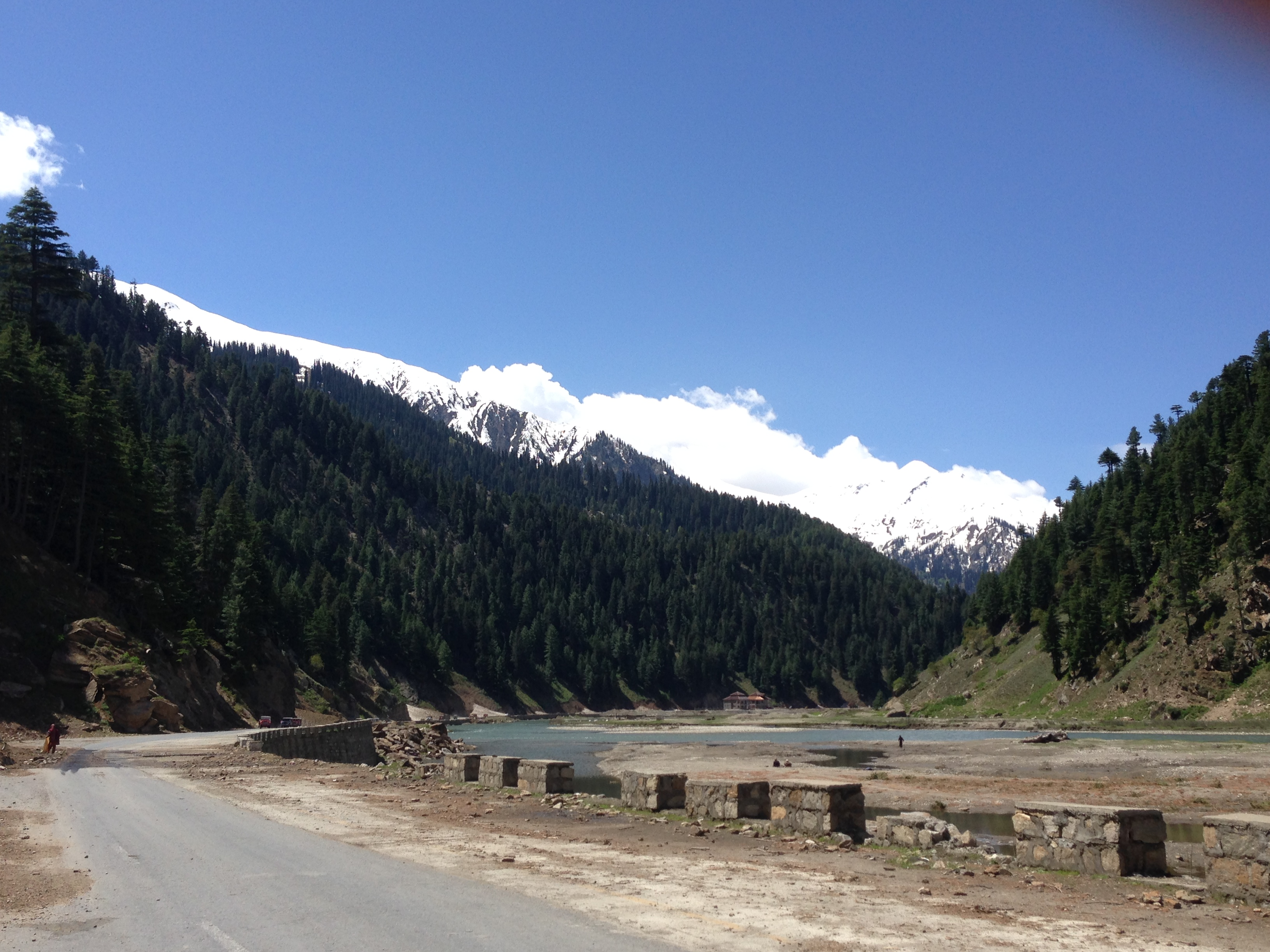
- Naran Town

- Location within Khyber Pakhtunkhwa Location within Pakistan
- Coordinates: 34°54′22″N 73°38′58″E
- Country: Pakistan
- Province: Khyber Pakhtunkhwa
- District: Mansehra
- Elevation: 2,409 m (7,904 ft)
- Time zone: UTC+5 (PST)
- Postal code: 21200
- Highways: N-15

Naran (Hindko, Urdu: ناران, romanized: Nārān, IPA: [nɑːɾɑːn]) is a town and tourist destination in the upper Kaghan Valley in the Mansehra District of the Khyber Pakhtunkhwa province of Pakistan. It is 119 kilometers (74 mi) from Mansehra city at an altitude of 2,409 meters (7,904 ft), about 65 kilometers (40 mi) from Babusar Top.

== Climate ==
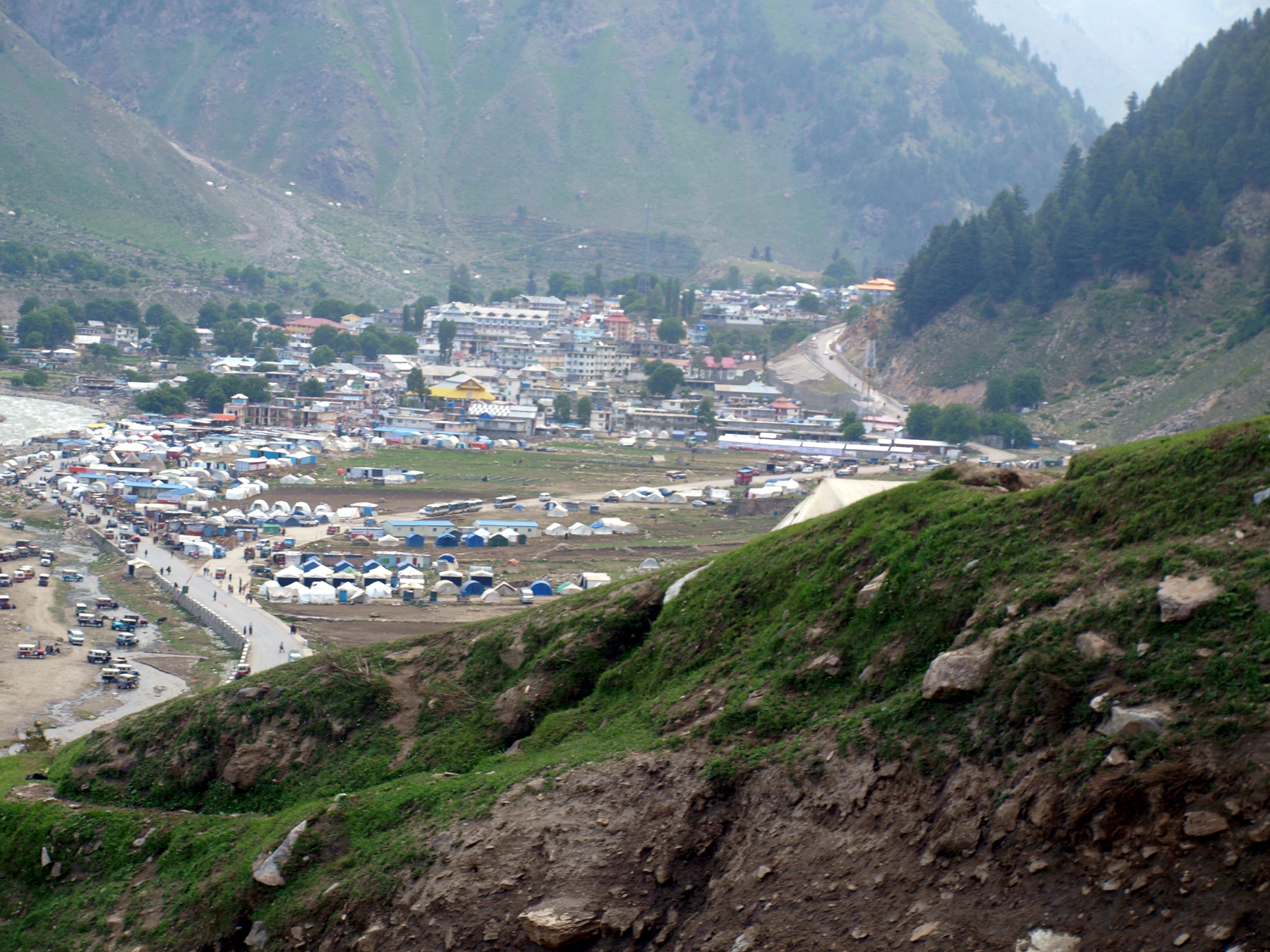
A view of the town

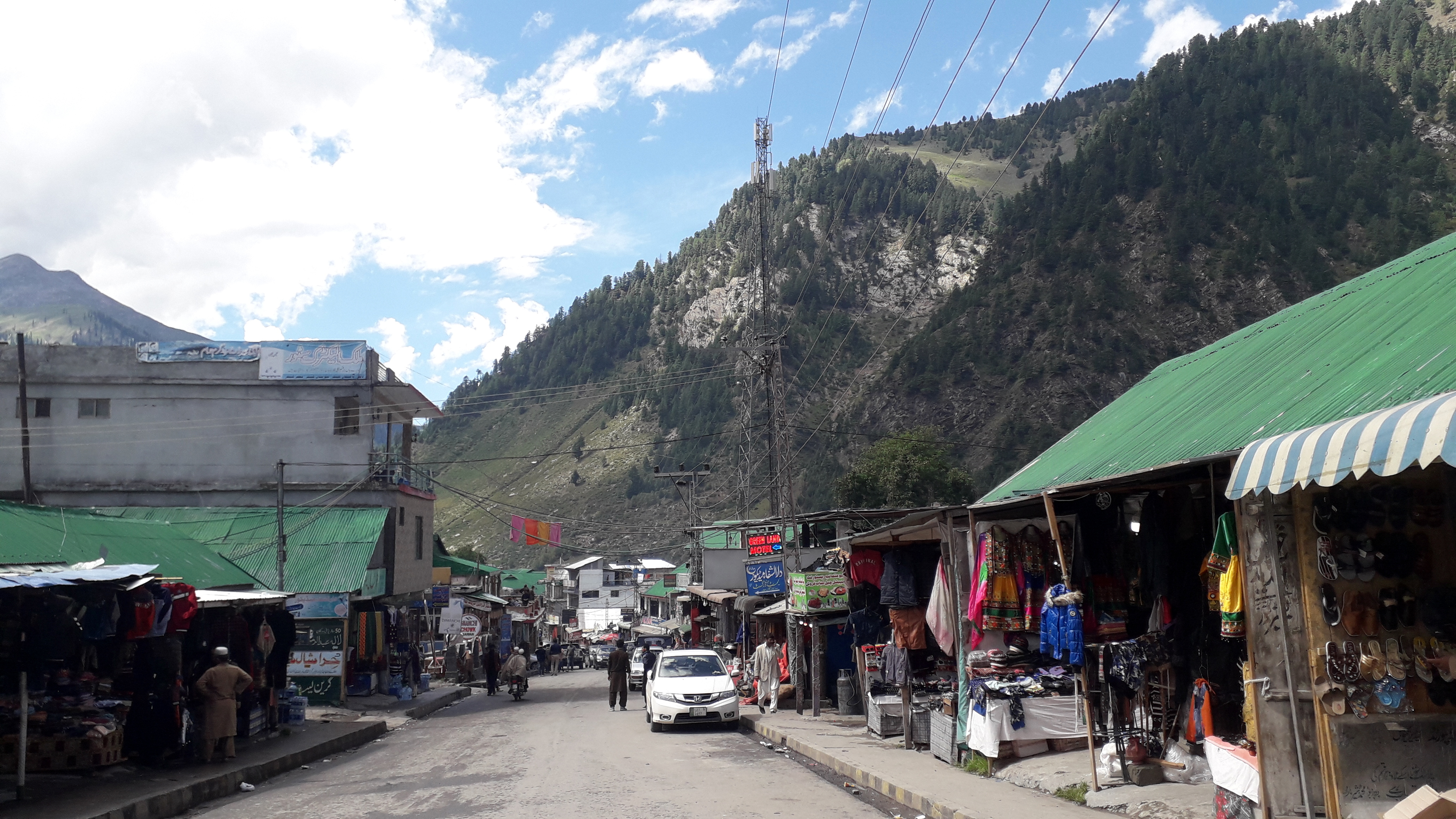
Naran city

Naran has a subarctic (Dfc) climate. There is significant rainfall in summers and heavy snowfall in winters. The region is Alpine in geography and climate, with forests and meadows dominating the landscape. The weather usually remains cloudy throughout the year. During the winters the temperature often remains below 0 °C with heavy snowfall. In the summers the temperature rarely exceeds 15 °C with heavy rainfall. Tourism keeps Naran busy in the summer, starting in the spring, the tourism season extends up to late in the fall. The average annual temperature in Naran is 4.7 °C.

Climate data for Naran, Kaghan Valley
Month	Jan	Feb	Mar	Apr	May	Jun	Jul	Aug	Sep	Oct	Nov	Dec	Year
Record high °C (°F)	6.3 (43.3)	11.3 (52.3)	15.3 (59.5)	21 (70)	22.1 (71.8)	25.3 (77.5)	24.5 (76.1)	24.1 (75.4)	19.3 (66.7)	17.4 (63.3)	13.2 (55.8)	8.8 (47.8)	25.3 (77.5)
Mean daily maximum °C (°F)	−3.4 (25.9)	3.4 (38.1)	8.5 (47.3)	11.3 (52.3)	15.2 (59.4)	17.4 (63.3)	18.1 (64.6)	16.5 (61.7)	14.8 (58.6)	10.6 (51.1)	5.2 (41.4)	1.2 (34.2)	9.9 (49.8)
Daily mean °C (°F)	−7.4 (18.7)	−2.5 (27.5)	2.2 (36.0)	5.0 (41.0)	9.7 (49.5)	12.6 (54.7)	13.9 (57.0)	11.6 (52.9)	9.0 (48.2)	4.6 (40.3)	0.4 (32.7)	−3.0 (26.6)	4.7 (40.4)
Mean daily minimum °C (°F)	−11.4 (11.5)	−8.4 (16.9)	−4.1 (24.6)	−1.3 (29.7)	4.3 (39.7)	7.8 (46.0)	9.7 (49.5)	6.8 (44.2)	3.3 (37.9)	−1.3 (29.7)	−4.4 (24.1)	−7.2 (19.0)	−0.5 (31.1)
Record low °C (°F)	−23.9 (−11.0)	−14.3 (6.3)	−15.4 (4.3)	−8.4 (16.9)	−8.7 (16.3)	−0.5 (31.1)	−1.3 (29.7)	−2.0 (28.4)	−6.3 (20.7)	−9.4 (15.1)	−14.3 (6.3)	−18.1 (−0.6)	−23.9 (−11.0)
Average precipitation mm (inches)	59 (2.3)	72 (2.8)	94 (3.7)	101 (4.0)	79 (3.1)	48 (1.9)	102 (4.0)	107 (4.2)	56 (2.2)	37 (1.5)	18 (0.7)	30 (1.2)	803 (31.6)
Average rainy days	5	9	10	10	10	8	8	8	5	5	3	5	86
Average snowy days	14	7	6	7	5	0	2	3	0	4	7	13	68
Source 1: Climate-Data.org (altitude: 2409m)
Source 2: My Weather 2

== See also ==
- Saiful Muluk Lake
- Lulusar Lake
- Dudipatsar Lake
- Pyala Lake
