= Deaths in May 2015 =

The following is a list of notable deaths in May 2015.

Entries for each day are listed alphabetically by surname. A typical entry lists information in the following sequence:

- Name, age, country of citizenship and reason for notability, established cause of death, reference.

== May 2015 ==
=== 1 ===
- Stephen Milburn Anderson, 67, American film director, writer and producer, throat cancer.
- Martha W. Bark, 86, American politician.
- Jamie Bishop, 44, Welsh cricketer (Glamorgan).
- Pete Brown, 80, American professional golfer.
- José Canalejas, 90, Spanish actor (Django, The Ugly Ones, The Mercenary).
- Ray Ceresino, 86, Canadian ice hockey player (Toronto Maple Leafs).
- Amitabha Chowdhury, 87, Indian journalist.
- David Day, 63, Australian radio broadcaster (Triple M Adelaide).
- Petro Didyk, 54, Ukrainian footballer, traffic collision.
- Geoff Duke, 92, British motorcycle racer, six-time Grand Prix world champion.
- Harry Geisinger, 81, American politician, member of the Georgia House of Representatives (1969–1974, since 2005), leukemia.
- Dave Goldberg, 47, American executive (SurveyMonkey, LAUNCH Media), head trauma from treadmill fall.
- Vafa Guluzade, 74, Azerbaijani diplomat and political scientist.
- Leonard Haber, 82, American psychologist, politician and radio show host, Mayor of Miami Beach, Florida (1977–1979).
- John Hansen, 97, American politician.
- Alexander Kok, 89, South African-born British cellist.
- Amar Laskri, 73, Algerian film director.
- Paul Walter Myers, 82, British classical record producer.
- Francie O'Regan, 82, Irish hurler.
- Phyllis Rutledge, 83, American politician, member of the West Virginia House of Delegates (1968–1972, 1988–1994).
- María Elena Velasco, 74, Mexican actress, comedian and film producer (La India María), stomach cancer.
- Bob Wareing, 84, British politician, MP for Liverpool West Derby (1983–2010).
- Colin Whitaker, 82, English footballer (Shrewsbury Town, Oldham Athletic).
- Grace Lee Whitney, 85, American actress (Star Trek, Irma la Douce, Some Like It Hot).
- Beth Whittall, 78, Canadian Olympic swimmer (1956), double Pan American champion (1955).

=== 2 ===
- Stuart Archer, 100, British army colonel, recipient of the George Cross (1941).
- Michael Blake, 69, American author and screenwriter (Dances with Wolves), Oscar winner (1991).
- Guy Carawan, 87, American folk singer and civil rights activist.
- José María Castiñeira de Dios, 94, Argentine poet, pneumonia.
- Sarah Correa, 22, Brazilian swimmer, South American Games champion (2010), hit by car.
- John M. Daley, 91, American politician.
- Philip S. Goodman, 89, American director, screenwriter and producer (We Shall Return, Profiles in Courage).
- Konstantyn Kuzminsky, 75, Russian performance poet.
- Ma Shui-long, 75, Taiwanese composer.
- John Mahaffy, 96, Canadian ice hockey player (Montreal Canadiens, New York Rangers).
- Ryan McHenry, 27, Scottish film director and social media personality (Vine), bone cancer.
- Nick Mead, 93, British World War II Royal Navy officer.
- Martin Nag, 88, Norwegian writer, stroke.
- Andrew Noren, 71, American filmmaker (The Lighted Field), lung cancer.
- Rex Percy, 81, New Zealand rugby league player (Auckland, Balmain, national team).
- Maya Plisetskaya, 89, Russian prima ballerina, heart attack.
- Ruth Rendell, 85, English crime novelist (Inspector Wexford), stroke.
- Bob Schmidt, 82, American baseball player (San Francisco Giants, Washington Senators, Cincinnati Reds).
- Frank Snow, 74, American politician, lung cancer.
- Norman Thaddeus Vane, 86, American screenwriter and film director (Frightmare).
- Yu Pengnian, 93, Chinese real estate magnate and philanthropist.

=== 3 ===
- Abdul Wahid Aresar, 65, Pakistani politician.
- Revaz Chkheidze, 88, Georgian film director (Father of a Soldier, The Saplings).
- Thomas A. Constantine, 76, American police superintendent, Administrator for the Drug Enforcement Administration (1994–1999).
- John Elders, 84, English rugby union player (Leicester).
- Lawrence W. Fagg, 91, American physicist.
- Ned Fairchild, 85, American songwriter ("Twenty Flight Rock"), complications from Alzheimer's disease.
- Margaret Garwood, 88, American opera composer, acute heart failure.
- André Gruchet, 82, French Olympic cyclist (1956, 1960).
- Alan Hall, 62, British cell biologist.
- Bruce Barrymore Halpenny, 78, English military historian and author.
- Danny Jones, 29, English rugby league footballer, heart attack.
- Symphorian Thomas Keeprath, 84, Indian Roman Catholic prelate, Bishop of Jalandhar (1971–2007).
- Zoran Lalović, 65, Serbian musician.
- Lu Ping, 87, Chinese politician and diplomat, cancer.
- Harry Martin, 95, American judge.
- Hiroshi Osada, 75, Japanese poet and author.
- Elizabeth Raybould, 89, British nurse and nursing educator.
- Warren Smith, 99, American professional golfer.
- Su Wenmao, 86, Chinese xiangsheng actor.
- Per Sundberg, 65, Swedish Olympic fencer.
- Yūsuke Takita, 84, Japanese actor (Submersion of Japan, Double Suicide, The Long Darkness), cancer.
- Abdul Basit Usman, 40–41, Filipino fugitive, shot.
- Tung Jeong, 84, Chinese-born American physicist.

=== 4 ===
- Eva Aeppli, 90, Swiss artist.
- Ann Barr, 85, British writer (The Official Sloane Ranger Handbook).
- William Bast, 84, American screenwriter and author, Alzheimer's disease.
- Ellen Albertini Dow, 101, American actress (The Wedding Singer, Patch Adams, Wedding Crashers), pneumonia.
- Emilio Echeverry, 86, Colombian Olympic fencer.
- Zhivko Gospodinov, 57, Bulgarian footballer.
- Jesús Hermida, 77, Spanish journalist and broadcaster, stroke.
- Marv Hubbard, 68, American football player (Oakland Raiders, Detroit Lions), prostate cancer.
- Claude LaForge, 78, Canadian ice hockey player (Detroit Red Wings, Philadelphia Flyers, Montreal Canadiens).
- Andrew Lewis, 44, Guyanese Olympic boxer (1992) and WBA welterweight champion (2001-2002), traffic collision.
- Joshua Ozersky, 47, American food writer, drowned.
- James Ritter, 84, American politician.
- Rich Stotter, 70, American football player (Houston Oilers).
- Matti Viljanen, 77, Finnish politician, MP (1979–1991).
- William Willson, 93, British businessman (Aston Martin).
- John J. Wilson, 88, American politician.
- Vicente Joaquim Zico, 88, Brazilian Roman Catholic prelate, coadjutor Archbishop (1980–1990) and Archbishop of Belém do Pará (1990–2004).

=== 5 ===
- Jobst Brandt, 80, American author and cyclist.
- Michael Burns, 54, Irish Gaelic football player (Cork).
- Jon Castañares, 90, Spanish economist and politician.
- Gerard Davison, 47, Northern Irish Provisional IRA commander, shot.
- Craig Gruber, 63, American rock musician (Rainbow, Bible Black), prostate cancer.
- Oscar Holderer, 95, German-born American engineer, worked on Saturn V project.
- Hans Jansen, 72, Dutch politician, MEP (since 2014), stroke.
- Jimmy Jones, 87, English footballer.
- Ralph Lainson, 88, British parasitologist.
- Odd Lie, 88, Norwegian Olympic gymnast.
- Bruce G. Lindsay, 68, American statistician, cancer.
- Takashi Nomura, 88, Japanese film director (A Colt Is My Passport), pneumonia.
- Des O'Hagan, 81, Northern Irish politician (Workers' Party).
- Ann Shaw, 93, American social worker.
- Niisan Takahashi, 89, Japanese screenwriter (Gamera, the Giant Monster), intracerebral hemorrhage.

=== 6 ===
- Novera Ahmed, 85, Bangladeshi sculptor.
- Richard J. Bartlett, 89, American legislator, New York State Chief Administrative Judge of the Courts (1974–1979).
- William Bronder, 84, American actor (Stand by Me, CHiPs).
- Errol Brown, 71, Jamaican-born British singer (Hot Chocolate), liver cancer.
- Jerome Cooper, 68, American jazz drummer, multiple myeloma.
- Graham Harcourt, 81, British Olympic gymnast.
- Nicolas Huỳnh Văn Nghi, 88, Vietnamese Roman Catholic prelate, Bishop of Phan Thiết (1975–2005).
- Denise McCluggage, 88, American racing car driver, journalist, author and photographer.
- Michael O'Brien, 67, British historian of the Southern United States, cancer.
- Anson D. Shupe, 67, American sociologist.
- Janko Vranyczany-Dobrinović, 95, Croatian politician and diplomat.
- Jim Wright, 92, American politician, member of the U.S. House of Representatives from Texas's 12th district (1955–1989), Speaker of the House (1987–1989).

=== 7 ===
- Asim Thahit Abdullah al Khalaqi, 47, Saudi Arabian Guantanamo Bay detainee, kidney failure.
- Michael Barratt Brown, 97, British economist and political activist.
- Joey Brush, 59, American politician, member of the Georgia State Senate (1996–2004), traffic collision.
- Víctor de la Lama, 95, Mexican Olympian
- Frank DiPascali, 58, American financier and fraudster, lung cancer.
- John Dixon, 86, Australian cartoonist (Air Hawk and the Flying Doctors), stroke.
- Sir Sam Edwards, 87, Welsh physicist.
- Arieh Elias, 94, Israeli actor (Kazablan, The Boy Across the Street).
- Sir Maurice Flanagan, 86, British businessman (Emirates).
- Rigby Graham, 84, British painter.
- Leroy V. Grosshuesch, 95, American colonel.
- Amalendu Guha, 91, Indian historian.
- Thomas F. Lamb, 92, American politician, member of the Pennsylvania Senate (1969–1974) and House of Representatives (1959–1966).
- Gilbert Lewis, 74, American actor (Pee-wee's Playhouse, Don Juan DeMarco, Candyman).
- Józef Pazdur, 90, Polish Roman Catholic prelate, Auxiliary Bishop of Wrocław (1984–2000).
- Jean de Croutte de Saint Martin, 82, French Olympic equestrian.
- Michel Saykali, 82, Lebanese Olympic fencer.

=== 8 ===
- Zeki Alasya, 72, Turkish actor and director, liver disease.
- Sir Edward Burgess, 87, British army general, Deputy Supreme Allied Commander Europe (1984–1987).
- Joanne Carson, 83, American model.
- Chuck Dow, 83, American politician, member of the Maine House of Representatives (1971–1980) and Senate (1983–1990).
- Thomas Herlihy, 58, American politician, State Senator for Connecticut's 8th District (1999–2009).
- Mwepu Ilunga, 66, Congolese footballer.
- Menashe Kadishman, 82, Israeli artist, recipient of the Israel Prize (1995).
- Adriana Maraž, 84, Slovene graphic artist.
- Bob Nelson, 80, American songwriter.
- Bob Sandberg, 93, Canadian football player (Winnipeg Blue Bombers).
- Juan Schwanner, 94, Hungarian-Chilean football player and coach.
- Atanas Semerdzhiev, 90, Bulgarian politician, vice-president (1990–1992).
- Phil Skoglund, 77, New Zealand lawn bowls player, triples world champion (1988).
- Myriam Yardeni, 83, Israeli historian.
- Notable people killed in the 2015 Pakistan Army Mil Mi-17 crash:
  - Leif Holger Larsen, 61, Norwegian diplomat, Ambassador to Pakistan (since 2014).
  - Domingo Lucenario Jr., 54, Filipino diplomat, Ambassador to Pakistan (since 2013).

=== 9 ===
- Buddy Corlett, 93, Canadian-born New Zealand softball and basketball player.
- Russell Dermond, 78, American Olympic sprint canoer (1956).
- Berry Avant Edenfield, 80, American federal judge and politician, U.S. District Court Judge for the Southern District of Georgia (1978–2006), member of the Georgia State Senate (1965–1966), lung cancer.
- Edward W. Estlow, 95, American football player, journalist and businessman (E. W. Scripps Company).
- Kenan Evren, 97, Turkish military officer and coup leader, Chief of the General Staff (1978–1983), President (1980–1989).
- Johnny Gimble, 88, American country music fiddler.
- Igor Gorynin, 89, Russian metallurgist.
- Ton Hartsuiker, 81, Dutch pianist and director of music academies.
- Alexandre Lamfalussy, 86, Hungarian-born Belgian economist.
- Lo Wing-lok, 60, Hong Kong politician, member of the Legislative Council for Medical (2000–2004), lung cancer.
- Michael MacKellar, 76, Australian politician, MP for Warringah (1969–1994).
- Odo Marquard, 87, German philosopher.
- Đorđe Pavlić, 76, Serbian Yugoslav footballer.
- Ragne Tangen, 88, Norwegian children's television presenter.
- David Gilbert Thomas, 86, British-born American chemist and solid-state physicist.
- Elizabeth Wilson, 94, American actress (The Birds, The Graduate, 9 to 5), Tony Award winner (1972).
- Christopher Wood, 79, English novelist and screenwriter (Moonraker, Remo Williams: The Adventure Begins, The Spy Who Loved Me).

=== 10 ===
- Chukwuma Azikiwe, 75, Nigerian politician.
- Ray Baillie, 80, Canadian football player (Montreal Alouettes), fall.
- Ninad Bedekar, 65, Indian historian and writer.
- Jack Body, 70, New Zealand composer.
- Chris Burden, 69, American artist, melanoma.
- Al Cartwright, 97, American sportswriter.
- William T. Cooper, 81, Australian bird illustrator.
- Mario Da Vinci, 73, Italian Canzone Napoletana singer and actor.
- Jerry Dior, 82, American graphic designer, creator of the Major League Baseball logo, colorectal cancer.
- Juan Emery, 82, Spanish footballer.
- Anita Gordon, 85, American singer.
- Luiz Henrique da Silveira, 75, Brazilian politician, Senator (since 2011), Governor of Santa Catarina (2003–2006, 2007–2010), Minister of Science and Technology (1987–1988), heart attack.
- Delois Huntley, 69, American civil rights activist.
- Kim Kyok-sik, 76, North Korean military officer, Defence Minister (2012–2013), acute respiratory failure.
- Donald Neff, 84, American journalist and author, coronary heart disease and diabetes.
- James F. Rinehart, 64, American academic.
- Mario Rodríguez, 77, Argentine footballer (Chacarita Juniors, Independiente).
- Jindřich Roudný, 91, Czech Olympic steeplechase athlete (1952).
- Rachel Rosenthal, 88, French-born American performance artist, heart failure.
- Victor Salvi, 95, American-born Italian harpist and harp maker.
- Barbara Turnbull, 50, Canadian journalist and disability campaigner.
- Davey Whitney, 85, American Hall of Fame basketball coach (Alcorn State).

=== 11 ===
- Maggie Black, 85, American ballet instructor, heart failure.
- Alan Borovoy, 83, Canadian human rights activist and lawyer.
- Donna Jean Christianson, 83, American politician, cancer.
- Stan Cornyn, 81, American record label executive.
- Pierre Daboval, 96, French artist.
- Nick Dioguardi, 82, Italian racing driver.
- Peter Füri, 77, Swiss footballer (Concordia Basel, F.C. Basel), heart failure.
- Jef Geeraerts, 85, Belgian author, heart attack.
- Kay Heim, 97, Canadian baseball player (Kenosha Comets).
- John Hewie, 87, Scottish footballer (Charlton Athletic, Arcadia Shepherds).
- Olavi Lanu, 89, Finnish sculptor.
- Bob Light, 88, American college basketball coach (Appalachian State).
- Frank Matich, 80, Australian racing car driver.
- Leonardo Neher, 92, American diplomat.
- Glen Orbik, 51, American artist.
- Mohammad-Ali Sepanlou, 75, Iranian poet.
- Gideon Singer, 88, Israeli actor and singer.
- Eldridge Small, 65, American football player (New York Giants).
- Frankie Sodano, 84, American Olympic boxer (1948).
- Tommy Tolleson, 72, American football player (Atlanta Falcons), complications from Huntington's disease.
- Isobel Varley, 77, British tattooed woman, world's most tattooed senior, Alzheimer's disease.
- Derek Walker, 85, British architect.
- Sir John Watts, 93, Grenadian politician, President of the Senate (1988–1990, 1995–2004).
- Richard W. Winder, 91, American LDS church elder.

=== 12 ===
- Cecil Jones Attuquayefio, 70, Ghanaian football player and coach, throat cancer.
- Tony Ayala Jr., 52, American light middleweight boxer.
- Suchitra Bhattacharya, 65, Indian novelist, left ventricular failure.
- Mervyn Burtch, 86, Welsh composer.
- John Colenback, 79, American actor (As the World Turns), chronic obstructive pulmonary disease.
- John Compton, 91, American actor (The D.A.'s Man, Jesse James Rides Again, Cheyenne).
- John Dewes, 88, English cricketer (Middlesex, national team).
- Sir Peter Fry, 83, British politician, MP for Wellingborough (1969–1997).
- Peter Gay, 91, German-born American historian.
- Bill Guthridge, 77, American college basketball coach (University of North Carolina).
- Rachel Jacobs, 39, American entrepreneur, injuries sustained in a train derailment.
- Bobby Jameson, 70, American pop singer and songwriter.
- Syd Lieberman, 71, American storyteller.
- William MacDonald, 90, English-born Australian serial killer.
- Evany José Metzker, 67, Brazilian journalist, homicide.
- Saulat Mirza, 43–44, Pakistani convicted murderer and political activist, execution by hanging.
- Ruth Mompati, 89, South African politician (1956 Women's March).
- Robin Page, 82, British artist.
- John Slater, 63, Canadian politician, MLA for Boundary-Similkameen (2009–2013).
- András Takács, 69, Hungarian Olympic cyclist.
- Neranjan Wickremasinghe, 53, Sri Lankan politician.
- Anthony C. Yu, 76, American translator (Journey to the West) and literature scholar, heart failure.
- William Zinsser, 92, American writer.

=== 13 ===
- Earl Averill Jr., 83, American baseball player (Los Angeles Angels, Chicago Cubs).
- Eric Bakie, 87, Scottish footballer (Dunfermline Athletic, Aberdeen).
- Kathryn I. Bowers, 72, American politician, member of the Tennessee House of Representatives (1995–2005) and Senate (2005–2007).
- John C. Crowell, 98, American geologist.
- Derek Davis, 67, Irish broadcaster (Live at 3).
- Gill Dennis, 74, American screenwriter (Walk the Line, Return to Oz).
- Robert Drasnin, 87, American composer and clarinet player, complications from a fall.
- Lucy Fabery, 84, Puerto Rican jazz singer.
- Romolo Ferri, 86, Italian motorcycle racer.
- Joseph Fidel, 91, American politician.
- Ed Fouhy, 80, American journalist and television news executive (ABC, CBS, NBC), complications from cancer.
- George W. Haley, 89, American politician and diplomat.
- Albert Hitchen, 76, English railway preservationist and racing cyclist.
- Anna Levinson, 76, German zoologist.
- Nina Otkalenko, 86, Russian athlete.
- Bob Randall, c. 81, Australian Indigenous musician and author.
- David Sackett, 80, Canadian physician.
- Gainan Saidkhuzhin, 77, Russian Soviet Olympic cyclist (1960, 1964), heart attack.
- Stanley Sproul, 95, American politician, Mayor of Augusta, Maine (1971–1974), member of the Maine House of Representatives (1973–1974).
- Marisa Volpi, 86, Italian art historian and writer.

=== 14 ===
- James H. Andreasen, 83, American judge.
- Geraldo Majela de Castro, 84, Brazilian Roman Catholic prelate, Coadjutor Bishop (1982–1988) and Archbishop of Montes Claros (1988–2007).
- Charles Favre, 54, Swiss Olympic sailor.
- Jolly Katongole, 29, Ugandan Olympic boxer.
- B.B. King, 89, American Hall of Fame blues guitarist, singer and songwriter ("The Thrill Is Gone"), complications from Alzheimer's disease.
- Alex M. Loeb, 96, American painter.
- Thomas Lothian, 86, American politician and academic.
- Micheál O'Brien, 91, Irish Gaelic footballer and hurler (Meath).
- Stanton J. Peale, 78, American astrophysicist.
- Mariana Pfaelzer, 89, American federal judge, U.S. District Court Judge for the Central District of California (1978–1997).
- Jean Pliya, 83, Beninese playwright and short story writer.
- Martin St James, 80, Australian hypnotist, stroke.
- Franz Wright, 62, American poet, lung cancer.
- Zdzisław Żygulski, 93, Polish art historian.

=== 15 ===
- Ortheia Barnes, 70, American R&B and jazz singer, heart failure.
- Elisabeth Bing, 100, German physical therapist, author and proponent of natural childbirth.
- Jackie Brookner, 69, American artist, cancer.
- Michael Campus, 80, American director, producer, and screenwriter (The Mack).
- Samih Darwazah, 85, Jordanian executive (Hikma Pharmaceuticals).
- Alfred DelBello, 80, American politician, Lieutenant Governor of New York (1983–1985), Westchester County Executive (1974–1982), Mayor of Yonkers, New York (1970–1974).
- Tommy Dunne, 83, Irish international footballer.
- Corey Hill, 36, American mixed martial artist (UFC), collapsed lung and heart attack.
- Flora Hommel, 87, American childbirth educator.
- Bob Hopkins, 80, American basketball player (Syracuse Nationals) and coach (Seattle SuperSonics), heart and kidney failure.
- John Jarvis-Smith, 93, British World War II naval officer and shipbroker.
- Jacob Jensen, 89, Danish industrial designer.
- Matulidi Jusoh, 57, Malaysian politician, MP for Dungun (2008–2013), diabetes.
- André Jean René Lacrampe, 73, French Roman Catholic prelate, Bishop of Ajaccio (1995–2003) and Archbishop of Besançon (2003–2013).
- Claude Lajoie, 87, Canadian politician.
- John Lo Schiavo, 90, American Jesuit and educator, President of University of San Francisco (1977–1991).
- Flora MacNeil, 86, Scottish Gaelic singer.
- Carlos Maggi, 92, Uruguayan writer (Generación del 45).
- Valentina Maureira, 14, Chilean euthanasia advocate, cystic fibrosis.
- Didi Petet, 58, Indonesian actor.
- John Stephenson, 91, American voice actor (The Flintstones, The Transformers, Jonny Quest), Alzheimer's disease.
- James Takemori, 89, American judo coach.
- Donald Wrye, 77, American film director (Ice Castles).
- Garo Yepremian, 70, Cypriot-born American football player (Miami Dolphins), brain cancer.
- Renzo Zorzi, 68, Italian racing driver.

=== 16 ===
- Jackie Basehart, 63, American-born Italian actor (The Inglorious Bastards).
- Prashant Bhargava, 42, American filmmaker, cardiac arrest.
- Nelson Doi, 93, American politician, Lieutenant Governor of Hawaii (1974–1978).
- Ernesto Estrada, 65, Filipino basketball player, heart attack.
- Johannes Exner, 89, Danish architect.
- Elias Gleizer, 81, Brazilian actor, circulatory failure.
- Shikha Joshi, 40, Indian actress (B.A. Pass).
- Adam Kilgarriff, 55, English linguist.
- Moshe Levinger, 80, Israeli Orthodox rabbi.
- Dean Potter, 43, American rock climber, BASE-jumping accident.
- Adrian Robinson, 25, American football player (Pittsburgh Steelers, Temple Owls), suicide by hanging.
- Abu Sayyaf, Tunisian senior ISIS commander, head of oil operations, shot.
- Peter Tallberg, 77, Finnish Olympic sailor (1960, 1964, 1968, 1972, 1980) and IOC member.
- Syd Tate, 90, Australian VFL football player (Geelong).
- John Templeton Jr., 75, American physician and philanthropist, brain cancer.
- Raphael Tenthani, 43, Malawian journalist, traffic collision.
- Dominik Tóth, 89, Slovak Roman Catholic prelate, Auxiliary Bishop of Bratislava (1990–2004).
- Yeung Kwong, 89, Hong Kong pro-communist activist.
- Ahmed Zanna, 60, Nigerian politician, Senator for Borno Central (since 2011).

=== 17 ===
- Claude Carliez, 90, French fencer and stunt director (Moonraker, A View to a Kill).
- Chinx, 31, American rapper, shot.
- Óscar Collazos, 72, Colombian writer.
- Sheshrao Deshmukh, 85, Indian politician.
- Margaret Dunning, 104, American philanthropist, fall.
- Rex Garner, 94, British actor and theatre director.
- Leo Honkala, 82, Finnish wrestler, Olympic bronze medalist (1952).
- Keiji Matsumoto, 65, Japanese racing driver.
- Nancy Masterton, 84, American politician, member of the Maine House of Representatives.
- Michael Alfred Peszke, 83, Polish-born American psychiatrist and historian.
- S. W. Schmitthenner, 87, American missionary, President of Andhra Evangelical Lutheran Church (1969–1981).
- Gerald Steadman Smith, 85, Canadian artist.
- Don Smoothey, 96, British actor and comedian.
- Tranquility Bass, 47, American hip-hop musician.

=== 18 ===
- Frank Pierpoint Appleby, 101, Canadian politician.
- Norm Armstrong, 89, Australian football player.
- Halldór Ásgrímsson, 67, Icelandic politician, Prime Minister (2004–2006), heart attack.
- Tommy Bing, 83, English footballer (Margate).
- Dewi Bridges, 81, Welsh Anglican prelate, Bishop of Swansea and Brecon (1988–1998).
- Eric Caidin, 62, American film memorabilia collector, cardiac arrest.
- Cyprian Davis, 84, American Catholic monk and historian.
- Helen Gordon Davis, 88, American politician, member of the Florida House of Representatives and Senate.
- Raymond Gosling, 88, British scientist.
- Hasanuzzaman Khan, 88, Bangladeshi journalist.
- Steiner Arvid Kvalø, 92, Norwegian politician.
- Al Matsalla, 89, Canadian politician.
- Dick Mountjoy, 83, American politician, Mayor of Monrovia, California (1968–1976), member of the California State Assembly (1978–1995) and Senate (1995–2000), heart attack.
- Eli M. Pearce, 86, American chemist.
- Harald Seeger, 93, German football player (1. FC Union Berlin) and manager.
- Roland Sink, 89, American Olympic athlete.
- Jean-François Théodore, 68, French executive (Euronext).
- Elbert West, 47, American country music singer-songwriter ("Sticks and Stones").

=== 19 ===
- Ahmad Alaskarov, 79, Azerbaijani football player and manager.
- Jack Aspinwall, 82, British politician, MP (1979–1997), cancer.
- Joseph J. Barnicke, 92, Canadian real estate magnate.
- Manuel Bernabeu, 95, Spanish Olympic pentathlete.
- Joe Carr, 83, Scottish footballer (St Johnstone).
- James Findlay, 60, Australian Olympic swimmer.
- Sir Thomas Gault, 76, New Zealand jurist.
- Edmond Gong, 84, American politician, member of the Florida House of Representatives (1963–1966) and Senate (1967–1971).
- Gerald Götting, 91, German politician, President of the East German People's Chamber (1969–1976).
- Edward F. Holland, 84, American politician.
- Fahd Jaradat, 84–85, Jordanian politician, Finance Minister (1970).
- Bruce Lundvall, 79, American record executive (Blue Note Records), complications of Parkinson's disease.
- Patrick MacAdam, 80, Canadian writer.
- Ted McWhinney, 91, Australian-born Canadian politician and academic.
- Yevgeni Menshov, 68, Russian actor and presenter.
- Burhan Muhammad, 57, Indonesian diplomat, Ambassador to Pakistan (since 2012), burns from helicopter crash.
- Dale D. Myers, 93, American aerospace engineer, Deputy Administrator of NASA (1986–1989).
- S. V. Raju, 81, Indian politician.
- Happy Rockefeller, 88, American socialite and philanthropist, Second Lady of the United States (1974–1977), First Lady of New York (1963–1973).
- Jack Simpson, 86, Australian politician.
- State of Bengal, 50, Bangladeshi-born British DJ and music producer.
- Roger J. Thomas, 73, American physicist.
- Robert S. Wistrich, 70, Kazakh-born Israeli-British history professor, heart attack.

=== 20 ===
- Edward Adeane, 75, British courtier, Private Secretary to the Prince of Wales (1979–1985).
- Billy Baggett, 85, American football player (Dallas Texans).
- Bob Belden, 58, American musician, heart attack.
- Abdelaziz Bennani, 79, Moroccan army general.
- Sir Brian Cubbon, 87, British civil servant, Permanent Secretary of the Home Office (1979–1988), heart attack.
- Harald Eriksson, 93, Swedish cross-country skier, Olympic silver medalist (1948).
- Eileen Gray, 95, British bicycle racer.
- J. S. Harry, 76, Australian poet.
- Ebba Hentze, 84, Faroese writer.
- Kirsten Idebøen, 52, Norwegian financier (SpareBank 1).
- Robert T. Krska, 78, American politician.
- Sir John Lea, 91, British Royal Navy vice-admiral.
- Paul Liao, 67, Taiwanese entrepreneur, lung cancer.
- Chifita Matafwali, 55, Zambian politician, member of the National Assembly for Bangweulu (since 2011).
- Manfred Müller, 88, German Roman Catholic prelate, Auxiliary Bishop of Augsburg (1972–1982) and Bishop of Regensburg (1982–2002).
- Bob Priestley, 95, American football player (Philadelphia Eagles).
- Jan Prochyra, 66, Polish actor.
- Femi Robinson, 74, Nigerian actor (The Village Headmaster).
- Sudha Shivpuri, 77, Indian actress (Kyunki Saas Bhi Kabhi Bahu Thi), multiple organ failure.
- Mary Ellen Trainor, 62, American actress (Lethal Weapon, Die Hard, The Goonies), pancreatic cancer.
- Livien Ven, 81, Belgian Olympic rower.

=== 21 ===
- Jassem Al-Kharafi, 75, Kuwaiti magnate and politician, Speaker of the National Assembly (1999–2011), heart attack.
- Zaya Avdysh, 69, Ukrainian football player and manager.
- David Blake, 90, English cricketer (Hampshire).
- César Boutteville, 97, Vietnamese-born French chess player.
- Allan Cations, 82, Australian rules footballer (Richmond).
- Eduard Derzsei, 80, Romanian Olympic volleyball player.
- Anne Duguël, 69, Belgian author.
- Joaquim Durão, 84, Portuguese chess player.
- Robert M. Durling, 86, American scholar and translator.
- Fred Gladding, 78, American baseball player (Detroit Tigers, Houston Astros).
- Ernie Hannigan, 72, Scottish footballer (Preston North End, Coventry City).
- Louis Johnson, 60, American bassist (The Brothers Johnson, Michael Jackson).
- Martin Kitcher, 53, British singer-songwriter.
- James McDuffie, 85, American politician, member of the North Carolina Senate (1975–1987).
- Juan Molinar Horcasitas, 59, Mexican politician, amyotrophic lateral sclerosis.
- Marty Pasetta, 82, American television producer and director, traffic collision.
- Annarita Sidoti, 45, Italian race walker, world champion (1997), breast cancer.
- Ellen Tronnier, 87, American baseball player (South Bend Blue Sox).
- Twinkle, 66, British singer-songwriter ("Terry"), cancer.
- Alan Woodward, 68, English footballer (Sheffield United).

=== 22 ===
- Albert Baciocco, 84, American vice admiral.
- Marques Haynes, 89, American Hall of Fame basketball player (Harlem Globetrotters).
- Sir John Horlock, 87, British mechanical engineer and university vice-chancellor (Open University, University of Salford).
- Kevin Hunt, 66, American football player.
- Vladimir Katriuk, 93, Romanian-born Canadian alleged war criminal.
- Alan Koch, 77, American baseball player (Detroit Tigers, Washington Senators).
- Michel Mortier, 90, French interior designer and architect.
- John Mosley, 93, American football player (Colorado A&M Aggies) and World War II RAF officer (Tuskegee Airmen).
- Radomir Naumov, 68, Serbian politician, Minister of Energy and Mining (2004–2007), Minister of Religion (2007–2008).
- Virginia C. Purdy, 92, American archivist and historian.
- Aminah Robinson, 75, American artist.
- John C. Ruckelshaus, 85, American politician.
- Jean-Luc Sassus, 52, French football player, heart attack.
- Byron Sherwin, 69, American rabbi and theology scholar.
- Terry Sue-Patt, 50, British actor (Grange Hill). (body discovered on this date)
- Michael Osborne Waddell, 92, British World War II army officer and Military Cross recipient.

=== 23 ===
- Hugh Ambrose, 48, American historian and author (The Pacific), cancer.
- Marcus Belgrave, 78, American jazz trumpeter, heart failure.
- Leo Berman, 79, American businessman and politician, member of the Texas House of Representatives (1999–2013), lymphoma.
- Hugh Boyle, 79, Irish golfer.
- Moyra Caldecott, 87, South African-born British writer.
- John Carter, 87, American actor (Barnaby Jones, Scarface, Law & Order), pneumonia.
- Peter Corbett, 74, South African cricketer.
- Trojan Darveniza, 93, Australian football player.
- Zedi Feruzi, Burundian politician, shot.
- Boody Gilbertson, 93, American basketball player (Sheboygan Red Skins).
- Bruce Gilchrist, 84, British computer scientist.
- Andy Hess, 91, American politician.
- Yrjö Mäkelä, 88, Finnish Olympic athlete.
- Anne Meara, 85, American comedian (Stiller and Meara) and actress (Archie Bunker's Place, The King of Queens, Like Mike).
- Aleksey Mozgovoy, 40, Ukrainian pro-Russian separatist.
- Alicia Nash, 82, Salvadoran-born American socialite and mental health care advocate, traffic collision.
- John Forbes Nash, Jr., 86, American mathematician, laureate of the Nobel Prize in Economics (1994), subject of A Beautiful Mind, traffic collision.
- Carl Nesjar, 94, Norwegian painter and sculptor.
- Asbjørn Øksendal, 92, Norwegian writer.
- Andres Ortiz, 28, Puerto Rican basketball player, traffic collision.
- Ali Raymi, 41, Yemeni boxer, air strike.
- Carole Seymour-Jones, 72, Welsh biographer.
- Ross Speck, 87, American psychiatrist, complications from atrial fibrillation.
- Joseph Velikonja, 92, Slovene-born American geographer.
- Carlos Irizarry Yunqué, 93, Puerto Rican judge, justice of the Supreme Court (1973–1986).

=== 24 ===
- Morris Beckman, 94, English writer and anti-fascist activist (43 Group).
- Dean Carroll, 52, English rugby league footballer.
- Dorothy Fraser, 89, New Zealand community activist and politician.
- Krushna Ghoda, 61, Indian politician, MLA for Palghar (since 2014), heart attack.
- Cristian Gómez, 27, Argentine footballer (Club Atlético Paraná), heart attack.
- Vladimír Hagara, 71, Slovak footballer (FC Spartak Trnava).
- John H. Kerr III, 79, American politician.
- Sir Kenneth Jacobs, 97, Australian judge.
- Krzysztof Kąkolewski, 85, Polish writer.
- Eva Lee Kuney, 81, American child actress (Penny Serenade).
- Tanith Lee, 67, British science fiction, horror and fantasy writer (Blake's 7), breast cancer.
- Daniel Meltzer, 63, American lawyer, legal adviser to Barack Obama, cancer.
- Guido Plante, 78, Canadian-born Honduran Roman Catholic prelate, Coadjutor Bishop (2004–2005) and Bishop of Choluteca (2005–2012).
- Pedro Roque, 47, Cuban Greco-Roman wrestler, world champion (1987), respiratory failure.
- Michael W. Ryan, 66, American convicted murderer.
- Jarmila Šťastná, 82, Czech Olympic speed skater.
- Bharat Raj Upreti, 63, Nepali judge, justice of the Supreme Court (2009–2013), suicide by hanging.
- John Oliver Wheeler, 90, Canadian geologist.
- Winged Love, 23, Irish Thoroughbred racehorse, colic.

=== 25 ===
- George Braden, 65, Canadian politician, member of the Legislative Assembly of the Northwest Territories (1979–1983), gastric cancer.
- Dien Cornelissen, 91, Dutch politician, member of the Senate (1969–1971) and House of Representatives (1971–1972, 1973–1986).
- Robert Lebel, 90, Canadian Roman Catholic prelate, Bishop of Valleyfield (1976–2000).
- Nathan J. Lindsay, 79, American major general (USAF) and astronaut.
- Mary Ellen Mark, 75, American photographer, myelodysplastic syndrome.
- Moc Morgan, 86, Welsh fly fisherman and naturalist.
- John M. Murphy, 88, American politician, member of the U.S. House of Representatives from New York's 16th (1963–1973) and 17th (1973–1981) districts.
- Bill O'Herlihy, 76, Irish sports broadcaster (RTÉ Sport).
- Jorge Salomão, 77, Brazilian Olympic boxer.
- Wallace Sampson, 85, American critic of alternative medicine.
- J. H. Shennan, 82, British historian.
- John Stubbs, 77, Australian political journalist.
- Zhanna Yorkina, 76, Russian Soviet cosmonaut.

=== 26 ===
- Vicente Aranda, 88, Spanish film director (Amantes).
- Walter Byers, 93, American college athletics executive (NCAA), urinary tract infection.
- Claudio Caligari, 67, Italian screenwriter and director (Toxic Love, The Scent of the Night).
- Harold F. Clayton, 61, American sculptor, lung cancer.
- William Davidson, 95, English cricketer (Sussex).
- Gottfried Diener, 88, Swiss bobsledder, Olympic champion (1956).
- Leo Drey, 98, American timber magnate.
- Rocky Frisco, 77, American pianist (JJ Cale Band).
- Thorbjørn Gjølstad, 72, Norwegian jurist and civil servant.
- Franklin P. Hall, 76, American politician, member of the Virginia House of Delegates (1976–2009).
- Jim Harness, 81, American football player (Baltimore Colts).
- Bob Hornery, 83, Australian actor (Neighbours, Mad Max Beyond Thunderdome, The Importance of Being Earnest).
- Les Johnson, 90, Australian politician, MP for Hughes (1955–1966, 1969–1983).
- Sverre Johan Juvik, 93, Norwegian politician.
- Robert Kraft, 87, American astronomer.
- João Lucas, 35, Portuguese footballer (Académica).
- Ubirajara Ribeiro Martins, 82, Brazilian entomologist.
- Edward Moylan, 91, American tennis player.
- John Pinder, 70, New Zealand-born Australian comedy producer.
- Cyril Roger, 93, English speedway rider.
- Phil Schilling, 75, American magazine editor (Cycle).
- Art Thieme, 73, American folk musician.
- Aristidis Vlassis, 68, Greek painter.
- Dayton Waller, 90, American politician.

=== 27 ===
- Hassan Abdullah Hersi al-Turki, c. 71, Somali Islamist and Al-Shabaab leader, military leader of the Islamic Courts Union and Al-Itihaad al-Islamiya.
- Erik Carlsson, 86, Swedish rally driver.
- Nils Christie, 87, Norwegian criminologist.
- Cotton Coulson, 63, American filmmaker and photographer (National Geographic), scuba diving accident.
- Peter Celestine Elampassery, 76, Indian Roman Catholic prelate, Bishop of Jammu-Srinagar (1998–2014).
- Vittorio Paolo Fiorito, 74, Italian Hall of Fame basketball referee.
- Bill Foster, 79, American college basketball coach (Miami Hurricanes, Clemson Tigers, Virginia Tech Hokies), Parkinson's disease.
- S. Parker Gilbert, 81, American financier, President of Morgan Stanley (1983–1990).
- Irvine B. Hill, 87, American politician, Mayor of Norfolk, Virginia (1974–1976).
- Sir Gordon Hobday, 99, British scientist and industrialist.
- Andy King, 58, English footballer (Everton), heart attack.
- Karsten Lund, 71, Danish footballer (Vejle Boldklub).
- Michael Martin, 83, American philosopher.
- John Miller, 81, American football player (Washington Redskins).
- William Newman, 80, American actor (Mrs. Doubtfire, The Tick), vascular dementia.
- Liam Ryan, 79, Irish theologian and hurler (Limerick GAA).
- Franca Sebastiani, 66, Italian singer, cancer.
- John Siegal, 97, American football player (Chicago Bears).
- Elisabeth Wiedemann, 89, German actress.
- Russell Wolfe, 50, American film producer (God's Not Dead), complications from amyotrophic lateral sclerosis.
- Zhang Jieqing, 102, Chinese politician and writer.

=== 28 ===
- John Buckner, 67, American politician, member of the Colorado House of Representatives (since 2013), sarcoidosis.
- Jonas Čepulis, 75, Lithuanian heavyweight boxer, Olympic silver medalist (1968).
- Esther Ghan Firestone, 90, Canadian cantor.
- Ed Fullerton, 84, American football player (Pittsburgh Steelers).
- Herbert Gelernter, 85, American computer scientist.
- Steven Gerber, 66, American composer, cancer.
- Masayuki Imai, 54, Japanese actor, writer and director, colon cancer.
- Johnny Keating, 87, British musician ("Theme from Z-Cars").
- Skeeter Kell, 85, American baseball player (Philadelphia Athletics).
- Ray Kennedy, 58, American jazz pianist, multiple sclerosis.
- Gyles Longley, 96, British World War II army officer and Military Cross recipient.
- Robert S. Morse, 90, American prelate, Archbishop of the Anglican Province of Christ the King.
- Reynaldo Rey, 75, American actor and comedian (227, Friday, White Men Can't Jump), stroke.
- Claire Kelly Schultz, 90, American information scientist.

=== 29 ===
- Martha Bachem, 90, Austrian Olympic figure skater.
- Arthur Bourns, 95, American chemist, President of McMaster University (1972–1980).
- Henry Carr, 73, American track and field athlete, Olympic champion (1964), cancer.
- Peter Cropper, 69, British violinist.
- Doris Hart, 89, American Hall of Fame tennis player.
- Willie Horgan, 71, Irish hurling referee.
- Tom Jones, 72, American racing driver.
- Chris Kohlhase, 47, New Zealand softball player (national team) and coach (Samoa national team), Parkinson's disease.
- Natalya Lagoda, 41, Ukrainian-born Russian singer and model (Playboy), bilateral pneumonia.
- Rashid Massumi, 89, Iranian-born American cardiologist.
- Naomi Miyake, 66, Japanese cognitive psychologist, cancer.
- Wim van Norden, 97, Dutch journalist, director of Het Parool (1945–1979).
- Betsy Palmer, 88, American actress (I've Got a Secret, Mister Roberts, Friday the 13th).
- George Roger Sell, 78, American mathematician.

=== 30 ===
- Michel Arpin, 79, French Olympic skier.
- Jim Bailey, 77, American singer, actor and impressionist (Judy Garland, Barbra Streisand).
- Beau Biden, 46, American politician, Attorney General of Delaware (2007–2015), brain cancer.
- Joël Champetier, 57, Canadian author, cancer.
- Jake D'Arcy, 69, British actor (Still Game, Gregory's Girl, Outnumbered).
- John Drinkall, 93, British diplomat, Ambassador to Afghanistan (1972–1976), High Commissioner to Jamaica (1976–1981).
- Ingeborg Mueller Fernlund, 80, Swedish publisher.
- Hugh Griffiths, Baron Griffiths, 91, British jurist and law lord.
- James Grotstein, 89, American psychiatrist and psychoanalyst.
- Julie Harris, 94, British costume designer (A Hard Day's Night, Darling, Live and Let Die), Oscar winner (1966).
- Ivan Kochergin, 79, Russian Olympic wrestler.
- John L. Lumley, 84, American professor of aerospace engineering, brain cancer.
- Tony McNamara, 85, English footballer (Everton, Liverpool).
- Lennie Merullo, 98, American baseball player (Chicago Cubs).
- Cornell Moss, 55, Bahamian Anglican prelate, Archbishop of Guyana (since 2009), heart failure.
- L. Tom Perry, 92, American apostle of the Church of Jesus Christ of Latter-day Saints, thyroid cancer.
- Michael Collins Piper, 54, American talk radio host and conspiracy theorist.
- Azmat Rana, 63, Pakistani cricketer, cardiac arrest.
- Somalatha Subasinghe, 78, Sri Lankan actress and theater director.
- Vic Travis, 63, American baseball umpire.
- Alvin P. Wegeman, 88, American Nordic combined skier.
- Michele Wrightson, 73, American comic book artist.

=== 31 ===
- Iain Campbell, 87, English cricketer and headmaster.
- Nico Castel, 83, Portuguese-born American tenor.
- Will Holt, 86, American songwriter ("Lemon Tree") and playwright (Over Here!), Alzheimer's disease.
- Jonathan Howes, 78, American politician, Secretary of the NCDENR (1992–1997), Mayor of Chapel Hill, North Carolina (1987–1991), heart disease.
- Maj-Britt Johansson, 86, Swedish Olympic archer.
- Françoise-Hélène Jourda, 59, French architect.
- Hiroshi Koizumi, 88, Japanese actor (Mothra, Atragon), pneumonia.
- François Mahé, 84, French professional cyclist.
- Frank McKinnon, 80, Canadian sports executive.
- Ron Moore, 37, American football player (Atlanta Falcons), shot.
- Eric Palmgren, 98, Finnish Olympic sailor.
- Pat Petersen, 55, American marathon runner, pancreatic cancer.
- Christina Reid, 73, Northern Irish playwright.
- Slim Richey, 77, American guitarist, lymphoma.
- Mario Saliwa, 31, South African first-class cricketer.
- Rochelle Lee Shoretz, 42, American lawyer, complications from breast cancer.
- Gladys Taylor, 97, Canadian writer and newspaper publisher.
- Karl Wlaschek, 97, Austrian executive, founder of Billa.
