= Indonesia–Pakistan relations =

- Indonesia: Pakistan

Diplomatic mission
- Indonesian Embassy, Islamabad: Pakistani Embassy, Jakarta

Envoy
- Ambassador Chandra Warsenanto Sukotjo: Ambassador Zahid Hafeez Chaudhri

Indonesia–Pakistan relations refer to the diplomatic relations between the Republic of Indonesia and the Islamic Republic of Pakistan, which were established on 28 April 1950. Indonesia has the world's largest Muslim population, while Pakistan has the world's second-largest Muslim population. Unlike Pakistan, Indonesia is a constitutionally secular state and does not endorse Islam as its state religion; however, both countries are member states of the Organization of Islamic Cooperation. The two states are also part of the Developing 8. Pakistan has an embassy in Jakarta, while Indonesia maintains an embassy and a consulate-general in Islamabad and Karachi, respectively. According to a 2014 BBC World Service poll, 40% of Indonesians view Pakistan's influence positively, with 31% expressing a negative view.

On 8 May 2015, the spouse of the Indonesian ambassador to Pakistan, Heri Listyawati, was killed in the Pakistan Army Mi-17 helicopter crash in the mountainous northern region of Gilgit−Baltistan. Her husband, Burhan Muhammad, was among the injured, and later succumbed to his wounds in a hospital in Singapore on 19 May. The crash also killed other diplomats, which included the ambassadors of Norway and the Philippines to Pakistan, as well as the spouse of a Malaysian diplomat.

== History ==
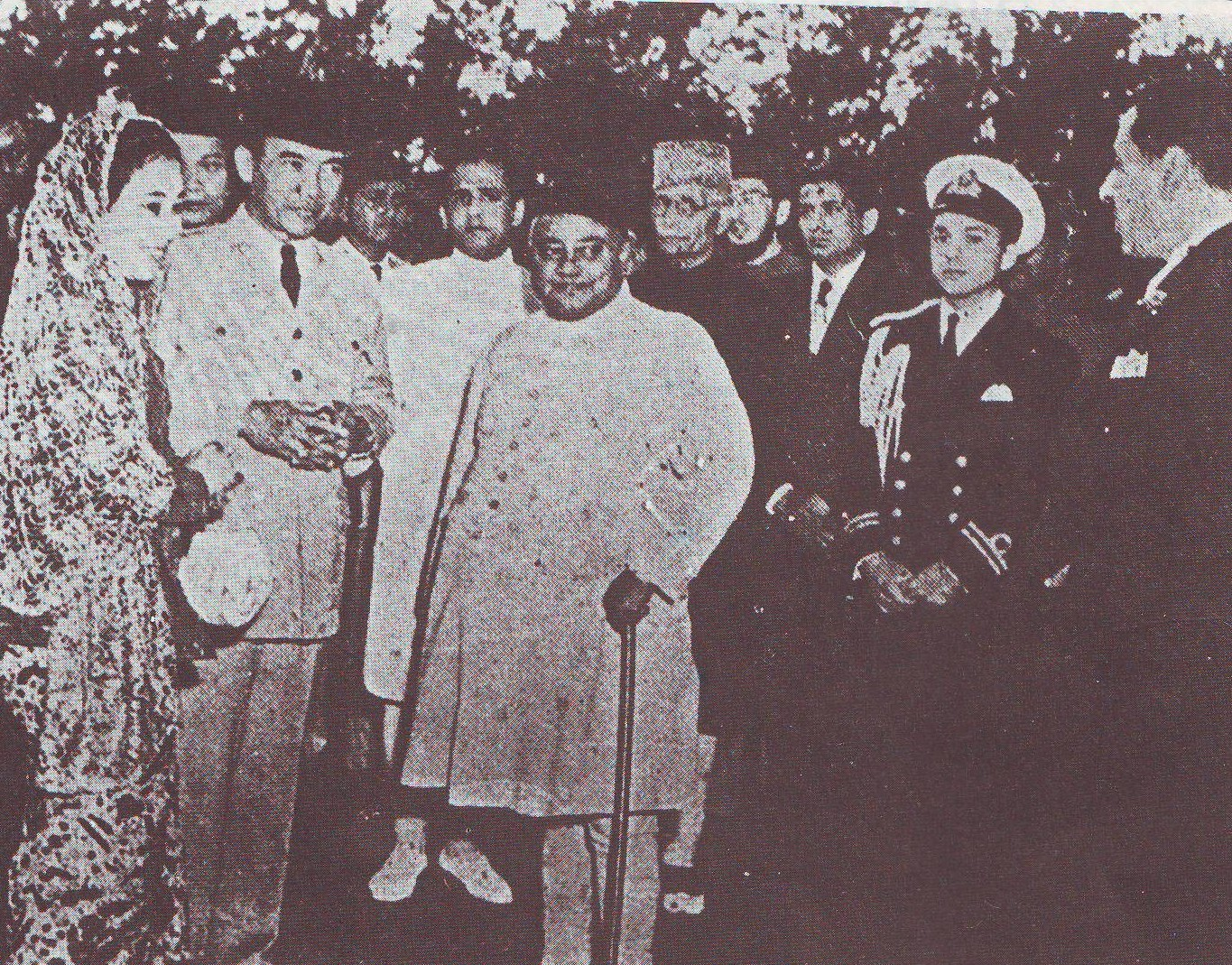
President Sukarno and Governor-General Sir Khawaja Nazimuddin, January 1950.

During the Indonesian National Revolution, Pakistan's founder Muhammad Ali Jinnah encouraged Muslim soldiers serving in the British Indian Army to join hands with the Indonesians in their fight against the Dutch Empire's colonization of Indonesia. As a result, around 600 Muslim soldiers of the British Indian Army deserted, putting their lot at stake, and went to Indonesia to fight. Out of these 600 soldiers, 500 died in the fighting, while the survivors returned to Pakistan or continued to live in Indonesia. In August, Jinnah ordered the detainment of the Dutch planes at Karachi air terminal who were landed there after obtaining permission from the British. These planes were full of weapons, proceeding to Jakarta to enhance Dutch fortification and arms stockpile to increase animosity against the Indonesian Republic, and Jinnah sent 100 more Pakistan Armed force Infantry troopers to Indonesia to back a Guerrilla warfare against the Dutch. As a recognition of the assistance from Pakistani Muslim soldiers, Indonesia presented Independence War Awards to the volunteer fighters and the highest honour of Adipura to Muhammad Ali Jinnah posthumously during the Indonesian Golden Jubilee celebration of 17 August 1995.

=== Ties during the Indo-Pakistani War of 1965 ===
Pakistan's relationship with Indonesia greatly developed under Pakistani President Ayub Khan. During the Second Indo−Pakistani War, Indonesia supported Pakistan and offered to militarily intervene in the conflict by attacking and seizing the Andaman and Nicobar Islands of India to open up a second front and relieve pressure on Pakistan in Kashmir and Pakistani Punjab, which India tried to attack following Pakistan's Operation Gibraltar.

== Defence cooperation ==
Indonesia and Pakistan have signed a memorandum of understanding on defence cooperation, one of the key terms of which is an offer for Indonesia to take part in joint manufacturing between Pakistan and China for the JF-17 Thunder light multirole fighter jet. The two states also exchange military personnel for training.

According to a press release on 4 September 2018, the two sides agreed to strengthen, expand and diversify bilateral defence cooperation through all available forums. The JDCC is the highest form of defence collaboration between the two countries.

== Trade relationship ==
In 2016, bilateral trade between Pakistan and Indonesia reached US$2.3 billion. Pakistani exports to Indonesia include kinnow, seafood, textiles, cotton yarn, medical equipment, rice, wheat, and carpets while Indonesia exports palm oil to Pakistan. The two countries have a standing preferential trade agreement known as the Indonesia–Pakistan Preferential Trade Agreement, signed in February 2012.

== See also ==
- Pakistanis in Indonesia
- Indonesians in Pakistan
