= Fouhy =

Fouhy is a surname. Notable people with this surname include:

- Ben Fouhy (born 1979), New Zealand canoeist
- Craig Fouhy, American American football player and coach
- David Fouhy, official Secretary to the Governor-General of New Zealand
- Ed Fouhy (1934–2015), American journalist and television news executive
- Matty Fouhy (1923–1977), Irish hurler
- Roger Fouhy (born 1972), New Zealand cricket player
