= Pakistan Army Mil Mi-17 crash =

- 2009 Pakistan Army Mil Mi-17 crash
- 2015 Pakistan Army Mil Mi-17 crash
