= Massumi =

Massumi is a surname. Notable people with the surname include:

- Brian Massumi (born 1956), Canadian philosopher and social theorist
- Rashid Massumi (1926–2015), Iranian-American cardiologist
- Ali Massumi (born 1971), Iranian Professor of Structural Engineering
