= Quaglino =

Quaglino (pronounced [kwaʎˈʎiːno]), a rare Italian surname, may refer to:

- Alfredo Quaglino (1894–1972), Italian photographer, journalist, and motor racer
- Quaglino's, a restaurant in London, founded by Giovanni "John" Quaglino in 1929

== See also ==
- Quaglio
