= Nick Mead =

Nick Mead may refer to:

- Nick Mead (Royal Navy officer) (1922 – 2015), sank two U-boats in the Second World War
- Nick Mead (rower) (born 1995), American rower for Princeton University
