= Bernabeu (surname) =

Bernabeu or Bernabéu (pronounced [beɾnaˈbew]) is a Valencian surname, derived from Barnabas, ultimately derived from the Aramaic Bar Nebuah.

Notable people with this surname include:

- Almudena Bernabeu, Spanish attorney
- Antonio Bernabéu (1890–1967), Spanish lawyer, politician, and footballer
- David Bernabeu (born 1975), Spanish cyclist
- Iker Pajares Bernabeu (born 1996), Spanish squash player
- Manuel Bernabeu (1920–2015), Spanish pentathlete
- María Bernabéu (born 1988), Spanish judoka
- Santiago Bernabéu (1895–1978), Spanish footballer

== See also ==
- Gerard Piqué (Gerard Piqué Bernabeu, born 1987), Spanish footballer
- Tomas Morato (Tomas Eduardo Bernabeu Morato, 1887–1965), Filipino businessman and politician
- Bernabéu (disambiguation)
