= Kitcher =

Kitcher is a surname. Notable people with the surname include:

- Deidre Kitcher, Australian producer
- Martin Kitcher (1962–2015), British singer-songwriter
- Patricia Kitcher (born 1948), American philosopher
- Philip Kitcher (born 1947), British philosopher
- Tony Kitcher (born 1941), British diver
