= Caidin =

Caidin is a surname. Notable people with the surname include:

- Eric Caidin (1952–2015), American collector of film memorabilia
- Martin Caidin (1927–1997), American author and screenwriter
