= Embassy of the Philippines, Nairobi =

Diplomatic mission of the Philippines in Kenya

Embassy of the Philippines, Nairobi Pasuguan ng Pilipinas sa Nairobi Ubalozi wa Ufilipino nchini Nairobi

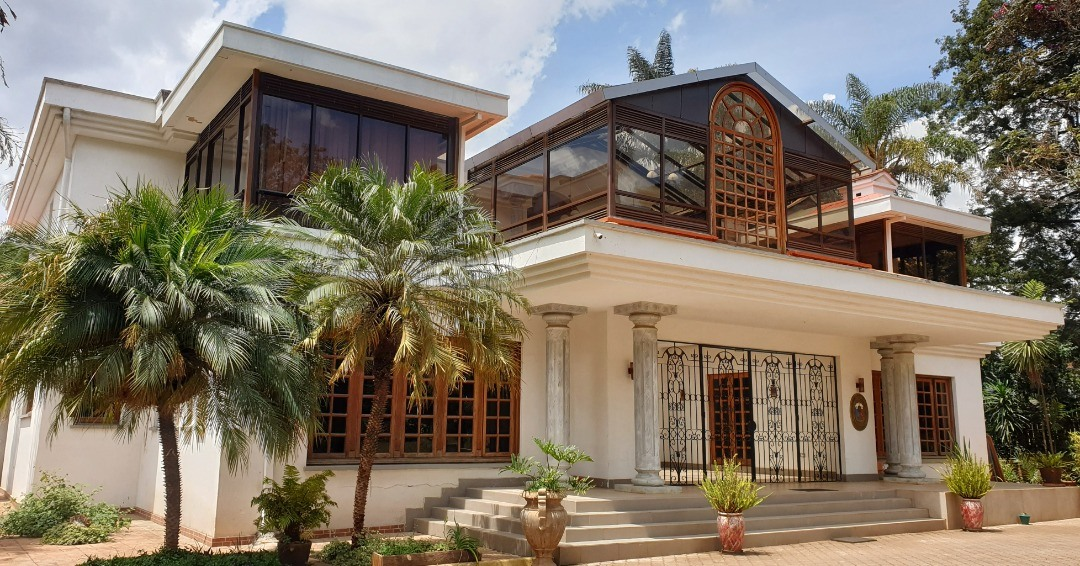
- Location: Nairobi
- Address: 001 Mzima Springs Road, Lavington
- Coordinates: 1°16′17.8″S 36°46′44.8″E
- Ambassador: Marie Charlotte G. Tang
- Website: nairobipe.dfa.gov.ph

The Embassy of the Philippines in Nairobi is the diplomatic mission of the Republic of the Philippines to the Republic of Kenya. Opened in 1975, it is located in the Lavington neighborhood of western Nairobi, across from the East African regional headquarters of the International Organization for Migration.

== History ==
Although diplomatic relations between the Philippines and Kenya were established in 1967, a resident mission in Kenya was not opened until July 4, 1975, during the presidency of Ferdinand Marcos, when Ismael D. Quiambao was deployed to the country to serve as the mission's chargé d'affaires. The first resident Philippine ambassador to Kenya, Mauro O. Baradi, arrived in Nairobi shortly thereafter on August 1, 1975, presenting his credentials to Kenyan President Jomo Kenyatta a few days later.

On January 16, 2019 the embassy went on lockdown due to the Nairobi DusitD2 complex attack three kilometers (1.9 mi) away, with staff also advising all Filipinos in Kenya to stay indoors.

== Chancery ==
The chancery of the Philippine Embassy in Nairobi relocated to Lavington on November 5, 2018, moving from its previous location near the State House on State House Road. It was inaugurated four days later by Ambassador Uriel Norman R. Garibay, with other members of the diplomatic corps in Kenya and the country's Filipino community in attendance.

A new consular section was later opened on May 6, 2019, with the space being formally inaugurated six days later.

== Staff and activities ==
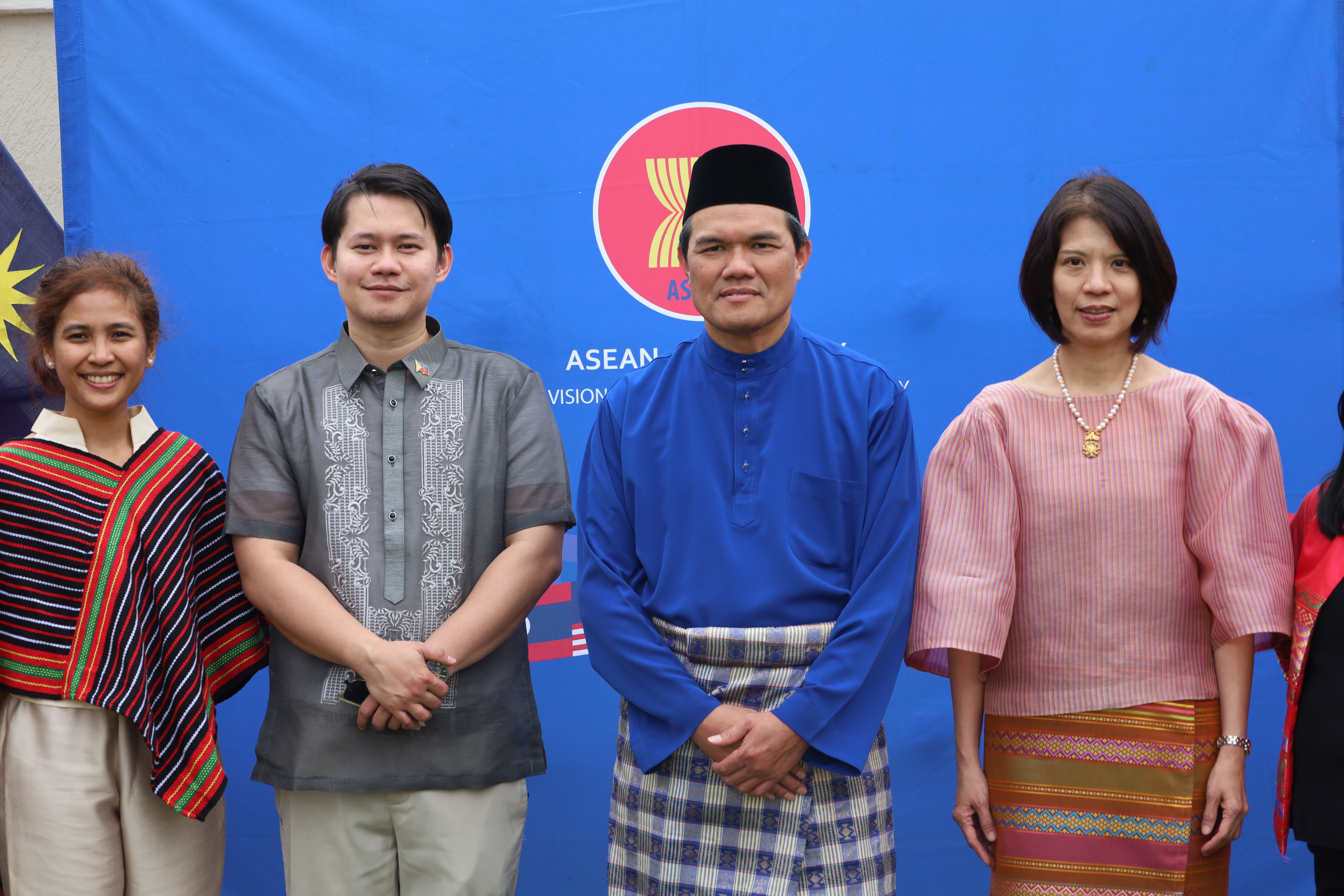
Tang (right) in 2025, along with other Filipino diplomats and Ruzaimi Mohamad (center-right), the Malaysian high commissioner to Kenya

The Philippine Embassy in Nairobi is headed by Ambassador Marie Charlotte G. Tang, who was appointed to the position by President Rodrigo Duterte on July 27, 2021. Prior to her appointment as ambassador, Tang, a career diplomat, served as Deputy Undersecretary for Bilateral Relations and ASEAN Affairs at the Department of Foreign Affairs, and prior to that served as Consul General at the Philippine Consulate General in Guangzhou. Her appointment was confirmed by the Commission on Appointments on September 1, 2021, and she presented her credentials to Kenyan President Uhuru Kenyatta on April 1, 2022.

Other notable diplomats deployed to the embassy include Domingo Lucenario, who previously served as ambassador from 2009 to 2013. Gina Lopez, former Secretary of the Department of Environment and Natural Resources, was also a regular visitor to the embassy while she was living in Kenya as a follower of Ananda Marga.

In addition to Kenya, the embassy exercises jurisdiction over several countries in Central and East Africa: the Democratic Republic of the Congo, the Republic of the Congo, Malawi, Seychelles, Somalia, South Sudan, Tanzania, Uganda, Rwanda, Burundi and the Comoros, and is also accredited as the Philippine mission to the United Nations Environment and Human Settlements Programmes. Djibouti, Eritrea and Ethiopia were previously under the embassy's jurisdiction until 2007, when all three countries were placed under the Philippine Embassy in Cairo, although Ethiopia was transferred back to the jurisdiction of the Nairobi mission on October 30, 2024. Tang was subsequently appointed as ambassador to Ethiopia, in addition to her duties as ambassador to Kenya, by President Bongbong Marcos, Duterte's successor, on January 2, 2025.

Many of the embassy's activities involve building and strengthening socioeconomic and cultural ties between the Philippines and Kenya. Among these include organizing Kenya's first-ever exhibition of Philippine traditional art at the Nairobi National Museum, and donating hygiene kits to underprivileged Kenyan schoolgirls. It has also been involved in providing to the welfare of Overseas Filipino Workers and other Filipinos in Kenya and other countries, such as facilitating the evacuation of Filipinos from South Sudan during that country's civil war, repatriating OFWs stranded in Kenya, and also holding consular outreach missions in cities throughout its jurisdiction.

== See also ==
- List of diplomatic missions of the Philippines
- List of diplomatic missions in Kenya
