= Indonesians in Pakistan =

Overview of Indonesian expatriate communities within Pakistan

- (Indonesia) (Pakistan)

Regions with significant populations
- Islamabad, Karachi

Languages
- Indonesian, Urdu

Religion
- Islam

Indonesians in Pakistan are a small expatriate community.

== Community ==
The Indonesian community in Pakistan comprises diplomats and consular staff, migrants and their families, employees working for multinational corporations, international students, tourists and Indonesian spouses married to Pakistanis. There are a few hundred Indonesian students pursuing education in various Pakistani universities and institutes. A large number of the Indonesian pupils are religious students receiving Islamic education from madrasas or Islamic universities.

== Organisations ==
Indonesia has an embassy in Islamabad and a consulate-general in Karachi. Both diplomatic missions provide consular services to Indonesian citizens in Pakistan.

== See also ==
- Indonesia–Pakistan relations
- Indonesian diaspora
- Immigration to Pakistan
- Pakistanis in Indonesia
