= Bernabéu =

Bernabéu may refer to:

- Bernabéu (stadium), an association football stadium in Madrid
- Santiago Bernabéu (1895–1978), Spanish footballer and 11th President of Real Madrid CF
- Bernabeu (surname), people with the surname
