= Domingo Lucenario Jr. =

Domingo Lucenario Jr. OL, OS

Philippine Ambassador to Pakistan
- In office April 24, 2013 – May 8, 2015
- President: Benigno Aquino III
- Preceded by: Jesus Yabes
- Succeeded by: Daniel Espiritu

Philippine Ambassador to Kenya
- In office 2009–2013
- President: Gloria Arroyo, Benigno Aquino III
- Preceded by: Ma. Rosario Janolo
- Succeeded by: Bayani Mangibin

Personal details
- Born: September 3, 1960 Manila, Philippines
- Died: May 8, 2015 (aged 54) Naltar, Gilgit-Baltistan, Pakistan
- Education: San Beda College of Law; Manuel L. Quezon University; University of Manila; Deutsche Stiftung für internationale Entwicklung

Domingo Domingo Lucenario Jr. (September 3, 1960 – May 8, 2015) was a Philippine diplomat. He served as Ambassador to Pakistan from April 24, 2013, to his death in the 2015 Pakistan Army Mil Mi-17 crash, on May 8, 2015. He has a rare distinction of winning three presidential awards as a diplomat.

== Early life ==
Domingo Lucenario Jr. was born on September 3, 1960, in Manila, Philippines. He was the son of Domingo Lucenario Sr. and Loreto Domingo.

== Education ==
He attended San Beda College of Law and graduated with a degree of Bachelor of Laws in 1984. He also passed the bar exams the same year. He also attained a degree of A.B. Political Science from Manuel L. Quezon University, where he graduated as magna cum laude and a Master of Laws from the University of Manila. He also attended Deutsche Stiftung für internationale Entwicklung in Berlin, Germany where he attained a Diploma in International Relations. He also pursued a Doctorate degree in Civil Law at the University of Santo Tomas

== Diplomatic career ==
During the early part of his diplomatic career, Lucenario served at various Philippine consulates and embassies namely the Philippine Consulate General in Hamburg, Germany (1986-1990); the Philippine Embassy in Berlin, Germany (1990-1992); the Philippine Embassy in Canberra, Australia (1996-2000); and the Philippine Consulate In Hong Kong SAR (2000-2004). From 2005 to 2009, he worked at the Department of Foreign Affairs as Assistant Secretary for Consular Affairs.

He was appointed Philippine Ambassador to Kenya by former President Gloria Macapagal-Arroyo in 2009 and served at the Philippine Embassy in Nairobi until 2012. During this time, he was concurrently the Philippine Permanent Representative to the United Nations Environment Program (UNEP) and the United Nations Human Settlement Program (UN Habitat).

He was nominated by former President Benigno Aquino III as his Ambassador to Pakistan, Afghanistan, Kyrgyzstan, and Tajikistan in November 2012 and was confirmed by the Commission on Appointments on December 19, 2012. Lucenario presented his credentials as Ambassador of the Philippines to Pakistan to President Asif Ali Zardari on April 24, 2013. He also presented his credentials as non-resident Ambassador to Afghanistan to President Ashraf Ghani on April 23, 2015; as non-resident Ambassador to Kyrgyzstan to President Almazbek Atambayev on July 1, 2013; and as non-resident Ambassador to Tajikistan to President Emomali Rahmon on April 10, 2013.

== Honors and awards ==
In 2008, Lucenario was conferred with the Gawad Mabini with the rank of Grand Officer and the Order of Lakandula with the rank of Grand Officer. He also received the Order of Sikatuna with the rank of Datu in 2009.

He was also conferred the Isabel La Catolica Award by the Spanish Government for his role in fostering closer relations between the Philippines and Spain.

He was also recognized as an outstanding alumnus by the San Beda College of Law Alumni Association.

== Death ==
Lucenario, together with the Ambassador of Norway Leif Larsen and six other people, died on May 8, 2015, when the helicopter he was boarding crashed in Naltar Valley in Gilgit-Baltistan, Pakistan. At the time he was also serving as the Philippines' non resident ambassador to Afghanistan, Kyrgyzstan, and Tajikistan.

His wife, lawyer Nida Arada Lucenario, and their three children. The Department of Foreign Affairs described his passing as a great loss to the nation and extended its deepest condolences to his family.

== Personal life ==
He was married to Nida Arada Lucenario, who is a lawyer, whom he had two daughters and a son.
