= Phyllis Rutledge =

American politician

Phyllis Jean Rutledge (March 11, 1932 – May 1, 2015) was an American politician.

A native of Kanawha County, West Virginia, Rutledge served in the West Virginia House of Delegates from 1968 to 1972, and from 1988 to 1994, as a Democrat.

Some of her accomplishments included having introduced a bill requiring a 10% pay cut for all state employees earning more than $50,000. The state Division of Highways once changed its policy on department-funded cell phones because Rutledge said too many calls were being made. She was the Kanawha County coordinator for Hillary Clinton's 2008 presidential campaign.

== Death ==
Rutledge died on May 1, 2015, aged 83, and was survived by two children, six grandchildren and nine great-grandchildren.
