= Eli M. Pearce =

Eli M. Pearce (May 1, 1929 – May 18, 2015) was research professor at New York University Polytechnic School of Engineering and a past-president of the American Chemical Society. He received a B.S. degree in chemistry from Brooklyn College in 1949. Pearce earned a Ph.D. in chemistry from Polytechnic Institute of Brooklyn (now NYU Polytechnic School of Engineering). He published more than 250 papers on his research. He designed fire-resistant polymers.
