= John Jarvis-Smith =

British shipbroker and oil trader

- Born: John Frederick Smith; 15 March 1924; Streatham, London, England
- Died: 15 May 2015 (aged 91); Edinburgh, Scotland
- Occupations: Shipbroker and oil trader
- Known for: Second World War service

John Frederick Jarvis-Smith DSC (15 March 1924 – 15 May 2015), born John Frederick Smith, was a British shipbroker and oil trader whose conduct during the Second World War earned him the Distinguished Service Cross (DSC).

Smith was born in south London into modest circumstances but early in life showed leadership potential and joined the Royal Naval Volunteer Reserve (RNVR) in 1941. He served in landing craft during the Second World War and saw action off Sword Beach on D-Day and in Operation Infatuate where he earned his DSC after originally being mistaken for an officer killed in action who was also by the name of Smith. He later changed his surname to Jarvis-Smith.

After the war he worked in oil-trading and shipbroking and in retirement divided his time between Wiltshire and the French Riviera with his partner Roger Cave where he got to know the "Riviera set". He spent his last years in Scotland where he was active in the Conservative Party and in raising funds for charity.

== Early life ==
John Smith was born on 15 March 1924 in Streatham, South London. His father worked for the local bus company. He was educated at Woodmansterne Primary School and in Tooting where he joined the Royal Naval Volunteer Reserve's Y Scheme which aimed to identify boys with officer potential while still at school. He was also a chorister and singles tennis champion for the London YMCA.

== Second World War ==
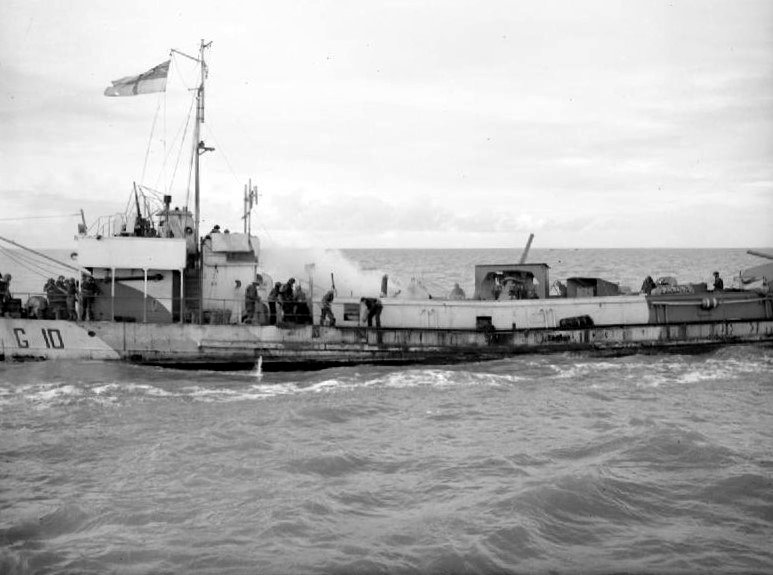
A Landing Craft Gun (LCG) on fire during Operation Infatuate

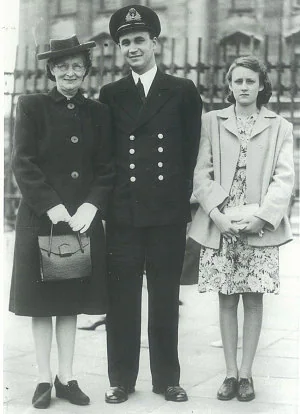
John Smith outside Buckingham Palace with his mother and sister after receiving his DSC

Smith joined the RNVR in 1941 as an ordinary seaman and was promoted to midshipman and later sub-lieutenant. He served during the war in landing craft and saw action in June 1944 off Sword Beach during D-Day and subsequently in Operation Infatuate in November that year, a joint British and Canadian amphibious assault on heavily protected German positions on the island of Walcheren. It was there that he earned his DSC while serving on LCG(L) No. 11, a landing craft adapted as a gun platform used to shell shore defences using two 4.7-inch guns.

During Operation Infatuate, landing craft and other naval vessels were tasked with drawing enemy fire away from troops landing onshore at a breach in the German defences. The tactic was successful but at great cost to the Allied vessels, the majority of which were either sunk or damaged. During the action, Smith, as he was still known, was sent to the wireless room by his commander while the rest of the officers remained on the bridge. The bridge was then hit by enemy shelling and Smith discovered that all the officers had been killed or wounded. Soon afterwards, the wireless room and the engine room were also hit by enemy fire. Smith took control of the landing craft and manoeuvred it on one engine next to a hospital ship where the wounded were taken aboard.

In March 1945, he discovered in The London Gazette that he had been mentioned in despatches as one of those serving with "gallantry and great devotion to duty in the assault on Walcheren, in which operation they lost their lives". It was found that the Admiralty had confused Smith with Lieutenant Leonard George Smith. A correction was published and John Smith upgraded to the Distinguished Service Cross (DSC). In 1971, in order to avoid future confusion, he officially changed his name to John Jarvis-Smith.

In December 1944, Smith was given command of a Landing Craft Tank (LCT) used to convey relief supplies to the city of Caen, which had been badly damaged in the advance from Normandy after D-Day, including an upright piano donated in England.

== Career ==
After the war, Smith entered the shipbroking business by joining the firm of Simpson Spence & Young where Simpson was Ernest Simpson, the second husband of Wallis Simpson. Later, he worked in oil trading for Murco and the Greek shipping magnate John Latsis before retiring at the age of 62. He left Petrola in 1985, when the company trading operations moved from London to Athens.

== Later life ==
During his retirement, Jarvis-Smith lived in a thatched cottage in the Savernake Forest, Wiltshire, and at Les Ferres on the French Riviera. With his long-term partner Roger Cave, who later became his civil partner, he met members of the "Riviera set" which included the photographer Alfredo Quaglino and his lesbian friend Billy Bailey whom Quaglino married shortly before her death in 1995. Jarvis-Smith and Cave were Bailey's executors and consequently, in 2003, Jarvis-Smith was responsible for the auction of Quaglino's collection of photographs of Riviera life in the mid-twentieth century.

In 1990, Jarvis-Smith and Cave moved to Crossmichael in Scotland where he was chairman of the local Conservative Party. He opened their garden to visitors to raise funds for the party and other causes such as the National Trust for Scotland and the Red Cross. His interests included ballet, the opera, and horse racing.

Jarvis-Smith died in Edinburgh on 15 May 2015. He received obituaries in The Daily Telegraph, The Herald, and The Scotsman.
