= Julia's House =

UK children's hospice

- Founded: 2003
- Founder: Michael Wise
- Type: Registered charity
- Location: Corfe Mullen, Dorset, England
- Origins: Named after Julia Perks
- Region served: Dorset, England
- Chief Executive: Martin Edwards
- Chair of the Board of Trustees: Brian Parker
- Employees: 65 (2008)
- Website: www.juliashouse.org

Julia's House is a children's hospice located in Corfe Mullen, Dorset, England and Devizes, Wiltshire. It is a hospice for children with life-limiting, life-threatening or terminal conditions. The majority of the children who are cared for by Julia's House are unlikely to live beyond the age of 18. The hospice costs £1.9 million to be maintained. Only 3% of this cost is provided by the government.

== History ==
Julia's House is named after Julia Perks, a paediatric nurse who died from cancer in 1997. Julia highlighted the need for facilities and services for children with life-limiting and life-threatening illnesses in the Dorset area. She particularly wanted to raise awareness of the need for more respite for the families of these children. Julia's House was founded by Michael Wise, who was the local councillor of Julia Perks. Wise helped the hospice to raise £15,000 in 2008.

The charity began in 2003, when Julia's House appointed two children's community nurses, who started working in home care for terminally ill children. Julia's House began with its main effort on providing care in the families' own homes.

Before being converted into a hospice, Julia's House was once a family home. In March 2006, it became a hospice that is an area for children to play and relax during the day. It also provides an occasional overnight service for 3 children and home care for 50 children. The chief executive of the hospice is Martin Edwards.

In 2023, James McVey from The Vamps joined local musicians in recording a new version of Silent Night recorded in aid of the Julia's House Christmas Appeal.

== Shirt controversy ==
In July 2008, Julia's House replaced Park Engineering as the logo on Weymouth F.C.'s shirts. This deal was made to raise the profile of both the charity and the football club. It was a free sponsorship deal. However, a number of people became concerned that Julia's House was paying Weymouth F.C. for the shirt deal so that the charity could have more publicity. When the charity began losing fundraising money due to this controversy, it denied these beliefs, and Mike Bartlett, the development director at Julia's House, issued the following statement:

[...] The charity is extremely cautious with expenditure and does not pay for any advertising or sponsorship. I would like to categorically state that Julia's House has not paid a penny to Weymouth FC.
