= Indonesia–Pakistan Preferential Trade Agreement =

The Indonesia–Pakistan Preferential Trade Agreement is a bilateral preferential trade agreement between Indonesia and Pakistan, signed on 3 February 2012.

== Clauses ==
The full agreement contained a single chapter with ten articles, the initial agreement containing lists of impacted Pakistani and Indonesian merchandise which covered 232 Indonesian goods and 311 Pakistani goods. Among other items, the agreement allowed Pakistani kinnow to enter Indonesia without tariffs and gave Indonesian palm oil a 15 percent margin of preference when entering Pakistan.

== History ==
Prior to the agreement, the two countries had agreed to a Framework Agreement on Comprehensive Economic Partnership sign by both trade ministers in November 2005. The full agreement was signed on 3 February 2012 in Jakarta after six rounds of negotiations. Indonesia formally ratified the agreement in November 2012, and the clauses came to effect in September 2013.

Since its signing, at least three rounds of renegotiations have been held throughout 2016–2017, and on 27 January 2018 an amendment to the agreement was signed which expanded the number of goods covered by the agreements to 279 Indonesian and 320 Pakistani goods. Additionally, negotiations had commenced on upgrading the PTA to a trade-in-goods agreement (TIGA), with two rounds of additional negotiations in 2019–2020. The first round of negotiations was held in Islamabad in August 2019. According to Indonesian Minister of Trade Enggartiasto Lukita in 2018, the current agreement could be further amended into a free trade agreement.

Although trade between the two countries had significantly increased after the agreement's signing, Indonesia's exports to Pakistan remained significantly higher than Pakistan's exports to Indonesia, with $2.53 billion exported by Indonesia and $296 million exported by Pakistan in 2017–2018. This deficit was the cause for Pakistan's request for the agreement's amendment. In February 2019, the Indonesian government issued a notice which unilaterally eliminated tariffs for 20 additional Pakistani goods, including mangoes, ethanol, and textiles.

According to Indonesian vice minister of trade Dyah Roro Esti Widya Putri, Indonesia aimed to upgrade the agreement from a PTA to a Comprehensive Economic Partnership Agreement by 2027.
