= Donald Neff =

American journalist (1930–2015)

Donald Neff

Donald Lloyd Neff (October 15, 1930 – May 10, 2015) was an American author and journalist. Born in York, Pennsylvania, he spent 16 years employed by Time, and was their bureau chief in Israel. He also worked for The Washington Star.

Neff served in the army from 1948 until 1950. After college studies he became a journalist in 1954, and, after a number of positions, joined the Los Angeles Times in 1960 and became their Tokyo correspondent.

== Career ==
Neff joined Time magazine in 1965, and, based in Saigon, covered the Vietnam War for two years. He was then appointed Time's bureau chief in Houston, (where he covered the Apollo Moon landing). He worked as Time's Jerusalem bureau chief before leaving the magazine in 1979. He wrote a retrospective piece in 1995 detailing the change in his pro-Zionist perspective during his years as correspondent in the Middle East.

Neff thereafter wrote mainly for Middle East International and the Washington Report on Middle East Affairs. He authored several books, including a trilogy on the Arab–Israeli conflict. Neff died in York, Pennsylvania on May 10, 2015 of heart disease and diabetes, aged 84.

His Warriors Against Israel, according to Archibald B. Roosevelt, argued that Henry Kissinger moved the United States from a role as neutral broker in the Middle East, to one in which it was a partner in a strong alliance with Israel.

== Awards ==
In 1980 he received the O.P.C.'s Mary Hemingway Award for best magazine reporting from abroad.

== Published work ==
- Donald Neff: Warriors at Suez: Eisenhower Takes America Into the Middle East, Simon And Schuster, New York, 1981. ISBN 978-0-671-41010-0
- Donald Neff: Warriors for Jerusalem: The Six Days That Changed the Middle East, ISBN 978-0-671-45485-2 Linden Press / Simon & Schuster. 1984.
- Donald Neff: Warriors Against Israel: How Israel Won the Battle to Become America's Ally, 1988. Brattleboro [VT], ISBN 978-0-915597-59-8
- Donald Neff: Fifty Years of Israel, American Educational Trust, Paperback, 1998 (A collection of 54 articles he has published in the Washington Report over the past several year)
- Donald Neff: Fallen Pillars: U.S. Policy towards Palestine and Israel since 1945, Institute for Palestine Studies, in Washington, DC, 1995 ISBN 978-0-88728-262-1 (reprinted 2002)
- West Bank Crackdown Time, Apr. 3, 1978
- "Clinton places U.S. policy at Israel's bidding". Jordan Times. 1995-04-10. Reprinted from Middle East International, 31 March 1995.
- Israel Lurks Behind Harsh U.S. Policy Aimed Against Iran, Washington Report on Middle East Affairs, February/March 1996, pp. 88, 91–92
- Ex-Terrorist Shamir Becomes the Likud's New Leader of Israel WRMEA, October 1996, p. 87
- U.S. Had to Wage Long Battle Against Israel's Technology Transfers to China WRMEA, June/July 1997, pp. 70–72
- Battle of Karameh Establishes Claim of Palestinian Statehood, WRMEA, March 1998, pp. 87–88
- How George Shultz Became the Most Pro-Israel Secretary Of State, WRMEA, April 1998, p. 78–79
- From Its Beginning, Israeli Policy Promoted War, Not Peace, WRMEA, May/June 1998, pp. 80, 82
- Sadat's Jerusalem Trip Begins Difficult Path of Egyptian-Israeli Peace, WRMEA, October/November 1998, pp. 83–85
- Jewish Terrorists Try to Assassinate Three Palestinian Mayors, WRMEA, June 1999, pp. 87–88
- An Updated List of Vetoes Cast by the United States to Shield Israel from Criticism by the U.N. Security Council, WRMEA, May/June 2005, p. 14
