= Lawrence W. Fagg =

American physicist

Lawrence Wellburn Fagg Jr. (October 10, 1923 – May 3, 2015) was an American physicist.

Lawrence Wellburn Fagg Jr. was born in New Jersey to Lawrence W. Fagg Sr. and his wife Doris Virginia Shea Fagg on October 10, 1923. The elder Fagg was recorded in the Army List and Directory of 1923 and 1926 as an infantry captain who had reported for duty on July 16, 1922. Fagg Jr. was raised in Washington D.C., and attended the United States Military Academy. Fagg then completed a Master of Science in physics at the University of Maryland, followed by a Master of Arts in the same subject at the Illinois University, before pursuing a doctorate in nuclear physics at Johns Hopkins University. He worked for two stints at the Naval Research Laboratory. While affiliated with the NRL in 1974, Fagg was elected a fellow of the American Physical Society. Fagg also worked for the Atlantic Research Corporation as a plasma physicist and served the Linear Electron Accelerator Laboratory as acting director as well as Catholic University of America as a research professor. He held a Master of Arts in religion from George Washington University and wrote books on the intersection of religion and science, including The Becoming of Time: Integrating Physical and Religious Time (1995) and Electromagnetism and the Sacred: At the Frontier of Spirit and Matter (1999).

Fagg was married to Mary Godfrey Skipp from 1993 until her death in 2010. In retirement, Fagg lived at The Willows Assisted Living Home in Winchester, Virginia, where he died on May 3, 2015.
