= 2009 Pakistan Army Mil Mi-17 crash =

Helicopter accident in Pakistan

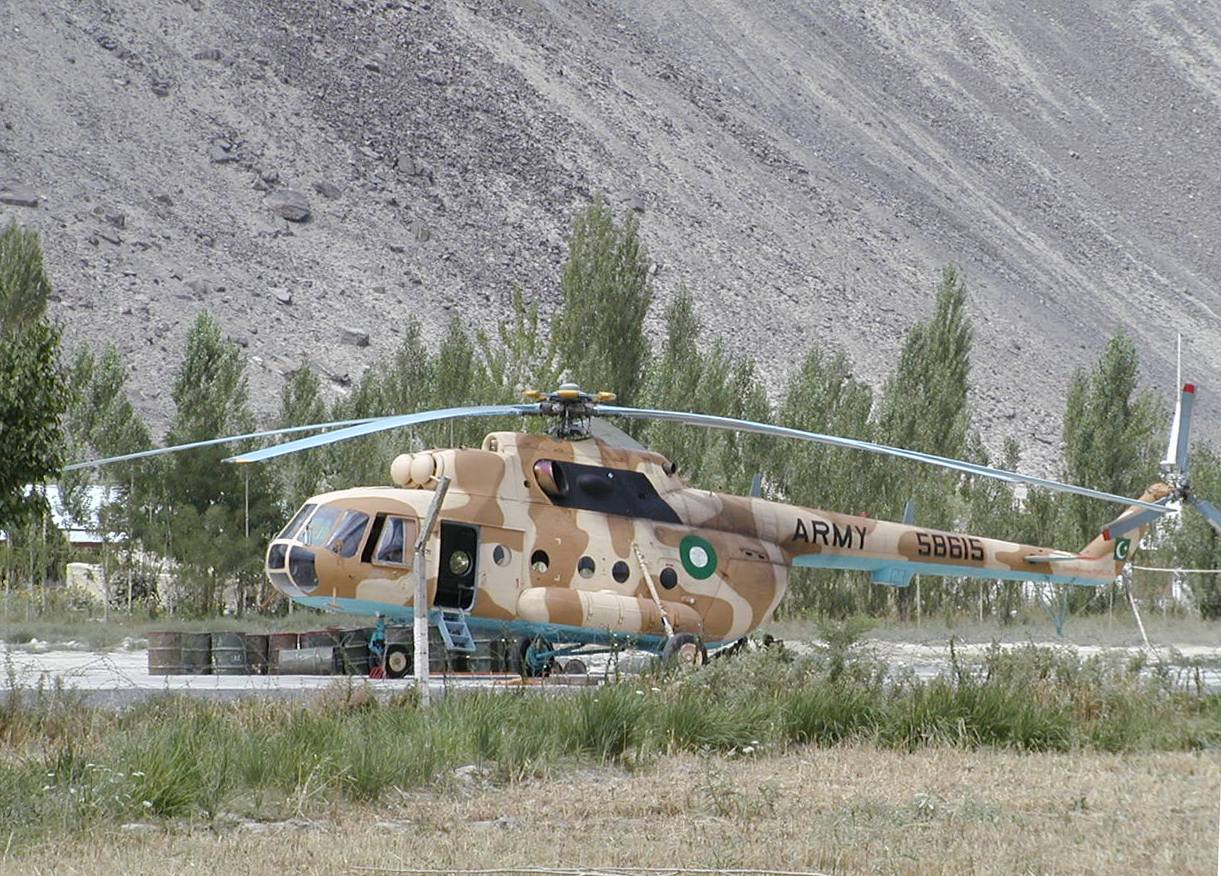
- A Pakistan Army Mi-17 helicopter, similar to the crashed aircraft

Occurrence
- Date: July 3, 2009
- Summary
- Site: Khyber Pass, Pakistan; 34°05′35″N 71°08′45″E

Aircraft
- Aircraft type: MI-17
- Operator: Pakistan Army
- Flight origin: Parachinar
- Destination: Peshawar
- Passengers: 37
- Crew: 4
- Fatalities: 41
- Survivors: 0

Map of the area

The 2009 Pakistan Army Mil Mi-17 crash occurred on July 3, 2009, in the Federally Administered Tribal Areas of Pakistan. A Russian-manufactured Mil Mi-17 transport helicopter of the Pakistan Army crashed in Orakzai Agency. According to a source within the Army the crash was due to a technical fault. Some sources reported local people attributing the crash to militant activity. The crash site was Chapar Feroze Khel, 20 kilometres (12 mi) from Peshawar, on the border of the semi-autonomous Orakzai and Khyber tribal agencies. The area is remote and also full of militants, which hampered the rescue efforts.

Official accounts stated 26 soldiers were killed in the incident, but other sources put the toll at 41 people on board, all of them being killed, including 19 from the paramilitary Frontier Corps, 18 army personnel and 4 crew members. The Mi-17 is normally limited to carrying 32 passengers. Most of the personnel on board were due to go on leave.

The helicopter was flying from Parachinar, the headquarters of Kurram Agency, to Peshawar. Previously there were unconfirmed reports that the helicopter might have been hit by ground fire from militants, with four casualties reported, but these were contradicted by an Inter Services Public Relations report. There was an ongoing operation in the area against militants linked to Al-Qaeda at the time of the crash. Militants have claimed they shot down the aircraft and that the Taliban captured the pilot; if true this was the first such incident.

== Investigations ==
Chief of the army General Ashfaq Parvez Kayani ordered an inquiry, but the crash prompted speculation whether the transport helicopter attracted militant gunfire and was shot down. This speculation is based on the fact that the area is a militant stronghold, and the militants had 12.7mm machine-guns capable of hitting a low flying aircraft.

Combat and transport helicopters usually fly high to avoid fire from the ground.

An official said that it would take some time before the actual cause could be determined.

It is a lengthy exercise

According to sources, the pilot had requested an emergency landing. They also blamed it on overloading of the aircraft. Witness accounts say that it was flying at low altitude in the mountains.

Weather was also not good in the area. According to one official,

The weather was bad and the copter was flying low. It could either be because of the bad weather or excess weight. But nothing can be said with certainty until we retrieve the wreckage

== Taliban claims ==
Taliban from nearby Darra Adam Khel claimed responsibility for the crash. A spokesman for the Taliban identifying himself as Muhammad called the Agence France-Presse news agency and said:

We shot down the helicopter. It was in retaliation for the Pakistani military operation in South Waziristan

This was rejected by a military spokesman, who again blamed it on a "'technical fault". He further said that:

Taliban militants frequently make false claims

== See also ==
- Operation Rah-e-Nijat
- Second Battle of Swat
- Operation Black Thunderstorm
- 2015 Pakistan Army Mil Mi-17 crash
