= William Willson (businessman) =

Chairman of Aston Martin 1972–1975 (1921-2015)

William Willson MBE
- Born: Stanley William Willson; May 1927
- Died: 25 December 2003
- Occupation(s): Chartered Accountant, chairman of Aston Martin (1972-1975)

Stanley William Willson, MBE (May 1927 – 25 December 2003), Chartered Accountant, was chairman of Aston Martin from 1972 to 1975.

In February 1972 Willson, "an ebullient entrepreneur" along with other investors paid £101 to buy Aston Martin's business, then reputed to be losing more than £1 million a year, from David Brown Limited which was experiencing its own financial troubles. The new owner was Company Developments his 4-year-old Solihull investment concern chaired by Willson who then became chairman of Aston Martin.

He appointed one of his co-directors of Company Developments, Geoffrey Fletcher, a property and building expert, as managing director and mechanical engineer, Harry Pollack, as technical director. Mr David Brown accepted presidency of Aston Martin with a seat on the board of directors. At the time Aston Martin had 500 employees. David Brown was later reported to have paid off Aston Martin's debts thought to be about £5 million.

Three months after Willson's firm took control a re-invigorated Aston Martin brought out two new models and the business was recovering. But in July 1974 a request for state aid of £500,000 was turned down. Mr Robert Maxwell offered to provide £100,000 of the required funds. Aston's 500 workers agreed to forgo wage rises for 12 months and they were given the opportunity to participate in a share-buying scheme. The shop floor gave management a unanimous vote of confidence. The reason for cash flow difficulties was given as California's stringent exhaust emission tests halting Aston Martin's US sales. Owners were reported to have sent in cheques for £1,000 and more. Mr Robert Maxwell, again contesting (unsuccessfully) the local seat in Parliament, was reported driving a newly acquired Aston Martin.

A few days later it was revealed another, second, request for government funds had been for £1,250,000 but three months later on New Year's Eve it was announced on the front pages of national press that while a much smaller government loan of £600,000 had been approved besides being inadequate it had been offered on the unacceptable condition that US sales would be handled by British Leyland's distributors. The same front-page report noted directors had requested the appointment of a receiver and Aston Martin would cease production and go into voluntary liquidation.

The receiver sold the business as a going concern in March 1975 for about £1,050,000 to a consortium led by Californian Peter Sprague (chairman of National Semiconductor) with Canadian George Minden and Jeremy Turner a London businessman.

Lengthy and public wrangling with Sprague over price arose from Willson's concern, over-ridden by the receiver, to achieve a better price for the Aston Martin business. At the offer price of £1,050,000 unsecured creditors would (and did) receive less than 10 pence in the pound and his own Company Developments would receive only £500,000 in repayment of a £750,000 loan.

Himself and his wife Rachel Willson were two of only 10 survivors of the 1957 Aquila Airways Solent crash Near Chessell, Isle of Wight, England.
