= Aristidis Vlassis =

Greek painter and engraver

Painting by Aristidis Vlassis.

Aristidis Vlassis (Greek: Αριστείδης Βλάσσης; 1947 – 26 May 2015) was a Greek painter and engraver.

== Early years ==
Vlassis was born and raised in Heraklion, where he was tutored in painting by Androgeos Alexandridis (Greek: Ανδρόγεως Αλεξανδρίδης).

== Career ==
Vlassis lived in Heraklion until 1994, then moved to Athens, where he lived and worked until his death. Human beings and all aspects of their life are a central theme in his creations. He presented 23 solo exhibitions and participated in 16 group exhibitions. His works are displayed in several galleries and institutions such as the Greek National Gallery, the Municipal Art Gallery of Heraklion, the Vorres Museum, the Cultural Foundation of the National Bank, the Teloglion Foundation, the Technical University of Crete, the Pancretan Cooperative Bank, etc., as well as many private collections in Greece, France and Belgium.
