= Valentina Maureira =

Chilean teenager

- Born: Valentina Maureira Riquelme; 2000/01; Chile
- Died: 14 May 2015 (aged 14); Pontifical Catholic University of Chile, Santiago, Chile
- Cause of death: Cystic fibrosis
- Known for: Euthanasia plea to Chilean President, Michelle Bachelet
- Parent: Fredy Maureira

Valentina Maureira Riquelme (2000/2001 – 14 May 2015) was a Chilean teenager who gained international attention after using social media to ask Chilean President Michelle Bachelet to allow her to die by euthanasia. Bachelet denied her request.

== Biography ==
Maureira was the daughter of Freddy Maureira and had a brother who died at the age of six of cystic fibrosis. She was herself diagnosed with the disease shortly afterwards.

Early in 2015, she used YouTube to post a video asking President Bachelet to allow her to be euthanised. Bachelet denied the request based on Chile's laws, citing the Catholicism in their country as a reason to enforce those laws.

Days later, President Bachelet visited the stricken girl in the hospital. Up until 23 March, Maureira received public support for her wellbeing and met someone aged beyond 20 with similar disease, prompting her to change her mind about euthanasia.

On 14 May 2015, Maureira died at age 14 in the hospital.
