= National Crisis Management Cell =

Former intelligence agency in Pakistan

- قومی تنظیمِ بحرانات سیل

Agency overview
- Formed: 2001; 25 years ago
- Dissolved: 2016; 10 years ago
- Jurisdiction: Government of Pakistan
- Headquarters: Islamabad, Pakistan
- Agency executives: Muhammad Ehsanullah Bajwa Director-General; Dr.Kashif Shabbir Lali SP-SSU Director

The National Crisis Management Cell (Urdu: قومی تنظیمِ بحرانات سیل) (reporting name: NCMC) was primarily a domestic intelligence assessment and management agency, operational under the Ministry of Interior (MoI), Government of Pakistan. The agency secondarily acted as a coordinating platform for all the other intelligence agencies in Pakistan. Other activities of the cell involved building efforts towards counter-intelligence, counter-proliferation, counter-insurgency and counter-terrorism, as well as assisting the government, at all levels of command, in managing intelligence.

The National Crisis Management Cell was established in 2001 to tackle domestic and foreign terrorism, and to eliminate religious extremism in the country. Its influence and role in the intelligence community included issuing warnings and formulating efforts against all kinds of threats posed to the state. After the December 2014 terrorist attack on Army Public School by Tehrik-i-Taliban Pakistan terrorists, the NCMC promoted efforts towards rigorous implementation of the National Action Plan (Pakistan).

After establishment of the National Counter Terrorism Authority, Pakistan, in March 2013, the National Crises Management Cell was annulled with effect from July 1, 2016.

== List of director generals ==
- 2002–08: Brig(R) Javed Iqbal Cheema
- 2008–10: Wing Cmdr(R). Tariq Ahmad Lodhi
- 2010–12: Brig(R) Javed Iqbal Lodhi
- 2012–12: Lt. Col(R) Umar Hayat Luk
- 2012–13: Brig(R) Javed Iqbal Lodhi
- 2013–13: Mr. Muhammad Ehsanullah Bajwa Deputy Inspector General of Police
- 2013–14: Wing Cmdr(R). Tariq Ahmad Lodhi
- 2014–16: Mr. Saud Aziz Deputy Inspector General of Police

== List of directors ==
- 2006-2013: Mr. Farid Ahmad Khan, Joint Secretary
- 2006-2016: Dr. Kashif Shabbir Lali, Superintendent of Police (SSU)

== See also ==
- National Counter Terrorism Authority (NACTA)

== Bibliography ==
- Hussain, Zahid (2008). Frontline Pakistan: the path to catastrophe and the killing of Benazir Bhutto (New ed.). Delhi: Penguin India. ISBN 978-0143064794.
- Liu, Jianhong; Hebenton, Bill; Jou, Susyan, eds. (2012-12-09). Handbook of Asian criminology. New York, NY: Springer. ISBN 978-1461452188.
- Carsten, Michael D., ed. (2007). International law studies. Newport, R.I.: Naval War College. ISBN 978-0160800689.
