= Zahid Hafeez Chaudhri =

Pakistani diplomat

Additional Secretary (Asia Pacific), Ministry of Foreign Affairs

Non-Resident High Commissioner to the Solomon Islands

Spokesperson for the Ministry of Foreign Affairs
- In office August 2020 – August 2021
- Preceded by: Aisha Farooqui
- Succeeded by: Asim Iftikhar Ahmad

High Commissioner of Pakistan to Australia

Personal details
- Education: National Defense University
- Profession: Diplomat

Zahid Hafeez Chaudhri is a Pakistani diplomat with over two decades of experience in international relations. He has served in various capacities, including as the Foreign Office Spokesperson and as the Non-Resident High Commissioner to the Solomon Islands.

He studied at the National Defense University, Washington DC.

== Career ==
Chaudhri has been a part of diplomatic missions for Pakistan, Washington DC and London. He served as the Director General overseeing regions including Afghanistan, Iran, and Turkey within the Ministry of Foreign Affairs. He has also contributed as the Joint Secretary for National Security within the National Security Division and as the Director General in the President's Secretariat. Currently, he holds the position of Additional Secretary responsible for the Asia Pacific region at the Ministry of Foreign Affairs.

=== As foreign office spokesperson ===
Chaudhry was appointed Foreign Office Spokesperson in August 2020, replacing Aisha Farooqui. He served in this position until he was succeeded by Asim Iftikhar Ahmad.

=== As High Commissioner to Australia ===
In May 2021, Chaudhry was appointed High Commissioner of Pakistan to Australia. This appointment is part of a series of diplomatic assignments approved by then Prime Minister Imran Khan.

=== As High Commissioner to Solomon Islands ===
Chaudhry was appointed as the Non-Resident High Commissioner of Pakistan to the Solomon Islands.
