= Andy Hess (politician) =

American politician (1923–2015)

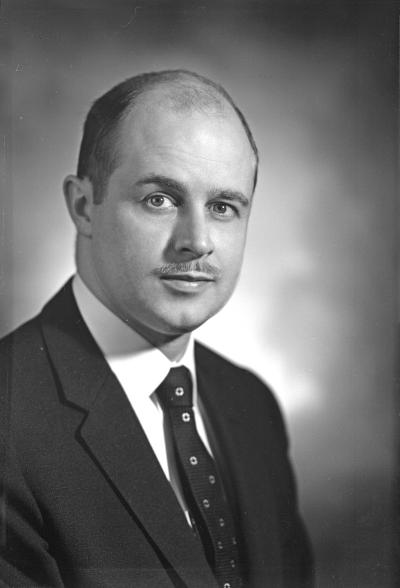
- Hess in 1957

Member of the Washington House of Representatives for the 31st district
- In office 1951–1957

Member of the Washington State Senate for the 31st district
- In office 1957–1964

Personal details
- Born: July 20, 1923 Abilene, Kansas, United States
- Died: May 23, 2015 (aged 91) United States
- Party: Democratic

Andrew Sterling Hess (July 20, 1923 – May 23, 2015) was an American politician in the state of Washington. He served in the Washington House of Representatives and Washington State Senate.
