= Eric Palmgren =

Finnish sailor

Eric Palmgren (9 August 1916 – 31 May 2015) was a Finnish former sailor who competed in the 1948 Summer Olympics.
