= Hiroshi Osada =

- 長田弘
- Born: November 10, 1939; Fukushima, Japan
- Died: May 3, 2015 (aged 75)
- Education: Waseda University; University of Iowa
- Occupation: Poet/author
- Writing career
- Notable work: Every Color of Light; Need for a Deep Breath『深呼吸の必要』
- Notable awards: Mainichi Publishing Culture Award (1982); Kodansha Publishing Culture Award (2000); Miyoshi Tatsuji Award (2010); Mainichi Art Award, (2013)

Hiroshi Osada (長田弘, 1939–2015) was a Japanese poet and author known for his contributions to contemporary literature and children's literature.

== Life ==
Born in Fukushima City, Japan, Osada graduated from Waseda University in 1963. He made his literary debut in 1965 with the poetry collection This Journey. In 1971, he traveled to the United States as a member of the International Creative Writing Program at the University of Iowa.

Known outside of Japan for his children's books, it was Osada's poetry that garnered him recognition in his native Japan. In 1982, he was awarded the Mainichi Publishing Culture Award for his book The Bookstore of the Century. In 1991, he received the Robō-no-ishi Literary Prize for The Making of Memories.

Osada's collaboration with illustrator Ryōji Arai on A Forest Picture Book, won the Kōdansha Publishing Culture Award for Children's Literature in 2000. The duo continued their partnership with the publication of Every Color of Light, which was later translated to English by David Boyd, subsequently winning awards for best book (Kirkus Reviews) and best picture book (Publishers Weekly).
