= Allan Cations =

Australian rules footballer

Personal information
- Full name: Allan Cations
- Born: 10 October 1932
- Died: 21 May 2015 (aged 82)
- Original team: Werribee
- Height: 185 cm (6 ft 1 in)
- Weight: 87 kg (192 lb)
- Position: Fullback

Playing career^{1}
Years	Club	Games (Goals)
1952–1957, 1959	Richmond	104 (8)
- ^{1} Playing statistics correct to the end of 1959.

Allan Cations (10 October 1932 – 21 May 2015) was an Australian rules footballer who played for the Richmond Football Club in the Victorian Football League (VFL).
