= Natalya Lagoda =

Ukrainian singer (1973–2015)

- Lagoda on the cover of Russian Playboy, 1998
- Born: March 4, 1974; Cherkasy, Ukraine
- Died: May 29, 2015 (aged 41); Luhansk, Ukraine
- Other name: Natalya Fisak
- Occupations: Singer, model
- Years active: 1996-2001

Natalya Lagoda (March 4, 1974 – May 29, 2015) was a Russian–Ukrainian singer, entertainer and model.

== Early life ==
Born in the city of Cherkasy, Ukraine, Lagoda graduated from a vocational school as a seamstress. She married Eduard Fisak and gave birth to son Dmitry. Lagoda later divorced Fisak and moved to Moscow, where she worked in the strip club Dolls.

== Career ==
In Moscow, Lagoda met businessman Alexander Karmanov who briefly assisted Lagoda in her career. Lagoda became known in Russian pop music as the performer of songs "Malenkiy Budda" (1998), "Marsianskaya lyubov" and "Nasha lyubov". In 1998, Lagoda was featured on the cover of Russian Playboy.

Lagoda and Karmanov later divorced, after which she attempted to commit suicide by jumping out the fifth floor window of her Moscow apartment. Although severely injured, she survived and later married a school classmate, Vitaly Simonenko, who sold her large apartment and took the money for himself. After this Lagoda moved back to Ukraine, to Luhansk. On May 29, 2015 Lagoda died in Luhansk from bilateral pneumonia at the age of 41.
