= Roger J. Thomas =

Roger J. Thomas was a solar physicist who worked at NASA for many years. He was an internationally recognized expert on the design of extreme ultraviolet spectrographs, and received the prestigious NASA Exceptional Service Medal in 2009.
