= Roger Fouhy =

New Zealand cricketer (born 1972)

Roger Fouhy (born 25 March 1972) is a New Zealand former cricketer. He was a right-handed batsman and right-arm medium-fast bowler. He was born in Hamilton. Fouhy made his only List A appearance, for Wiltshire, against Herefordshire, during the 1999 season. He scored 1 not out and took bowling figures of 1-34. Fouhy made a single first-class appearance, for Wellington, during the 2005–06 season, scoring a single run.
