= Martin St James =

Australian stage hypnotist and entertainer

- Born: Joseph Stanley Overell Simmonds; 1934; Western Australia, Australia
- Died: 14 May 2015 (aged 80–81); Gold Coast, Queensland, Australia
- Other names: Stan James, Rock Martin
- Occupation: Stage hypnotist
- Years active: 1950–2004

Martin St James (1934 – May 14, 2015) was an Australian stage hypnotist and entertainer. He grew up in the goldfields of Western Australia before joining a circus as a singing cowboy. He found success as a stage hypnotist in the 1960s and appeared on television and stage shows in the US, UK, Europe, Japan and Australia.

He produced a popular TV show, Spellbound, featuring his stage hypnotism in both the UK and Australia.

He was prosecuted in Victoria, South Australia and Tasmania for breaching their respective Psychological Practices Acts for practicing hypnotism without a license issued by a State Psychology Board.

His wife, Theresa, gave birth to a son making him Australia's oldest father in 2011 at age 77.

He died from a stroke in May 2015 at his home on the Gold Coast in Queensland aged 80.
