= Tommy Bing =

English footballer

Personal information
- Full name: Thomas Edward Bing
- Date of birth: 24 November 1931
- Place of birth: Broadstairs, England
- Date of death: 18 May 2015 (aged 83)
- Position: Winger

Senior career*
Years	Team	Apps	(Gls)
1947–1954	Margate	37	(4)
1954–1959	Tottenham Hotspur	1	(0)
1959–1964	Margate	39	(7)
- * Club domestic league appearances and goals

Thomas Edward Bing (24 November 1931 – 18 May 2015) was an English professional footballer who played for Margate and Tottenham Hotspur.

== Football career ==
Bing was born in Broadstairs and made his debut for Margate reserves in December 1947. The winger played in a total of 37 matches and scored four goals in his first spell with the Kent League club. After impressing Spurs boss Bill Nicholson, the White Hart Lane club paid a four figure sum for his services in September 1954. Bing featured mainly in the club's reserve side and made only one senior appearance in a 3-2 reverse at Bolton Wanderers on 19 October 1957. In July 1959 he returned to his former club and went on to participate in a further 39 matches and netting seven goals.

== Post-football ==
Outside of football, Bing supplemented his earnings by working as a plumber. Bing died on 18 May 2015.
