= Gyles Longley =

British Army officer of the Second World War (1918 - 2015)

Gyles Longley

Oliver Gyles Longley CBE MC (30 September 1918 - 28 May 2015) was a British Army officer of the Second World War who won the Military Cross in 1943 for his actions in Italy while commanding a squadron of 44th Reconnaissance Regiment near Battipaglia. Longley had a number of narrow escapes during his military service, including stepping on a mine that failed to explode.

Longley was born in the London district of Streatham, the son of an officer in the Honourable Artillery Company who in the First World War was also awarded the Military Cross. He was educated at Tonbridge School in Kent.

After demobilisation in 1946, Longley returned to his pre-war employers Gestetner. In 1965, he became managing director of Gestetner France, and in 1976 he was made a director of Gestetner Holdings Ltd with responsibility for Continental Europe, Africa, Pakistan and Sri Lanka.

== Memoirs ==
- To Hell with That! or the Life of Oliver Gyles Longley, C.B.E., M.C. Grimsay Press, 2012. ISBN 978-1845301279
