= Peter Corbett (cricketer) =

South African cricketer (1940–2015)

Personal information
- Born: 24 August 1940; Vryburg, South Africa
- Died: 23 May 2015 (aged 74); Amanzimtoti, South Africa
- Source: Cricinfo, 25 March 2016

Peter Corbett (24 August 1940 – 23 May 2015) was a South African cricketer. He played in 40 first-class cricket for Natal, North Eastern Transvaal and Transvaal from 1958/59 to 1968/69.
