= Alfredo Quaglino =

Italian photographer, journalist and race car driver

- Born: Alfredo André Cesar Quaglino; 8 November 1894; Turin, Italy
- Died: 1972 (aged 77–78); Pollone, Italy
- Occupations: Photographer, journalist
- Spouse: Frances Rachel "Billy" Bailey

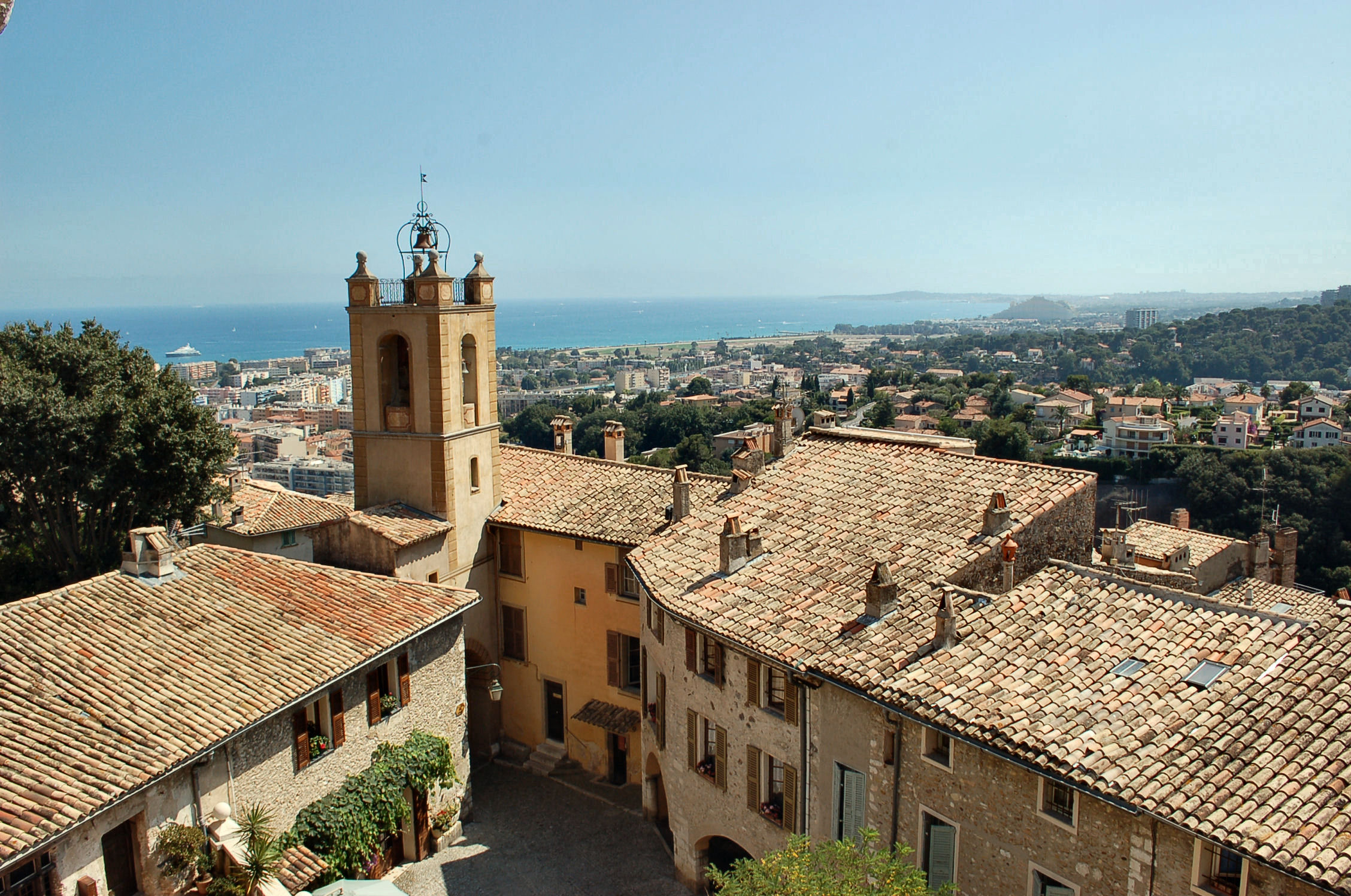
Haut-de-Cagnes, overlooking Cagnes-sur-Mer and the Mediterranean coast

Alfredo André Cesar Quaglino (1894–1972) was an Italian society photographer, journalist, and racing driver who spent most of his life on the French Riviera. He competed in the Biarritz-St Moritz rally in 1929. He photographed many figures from the worlds of art and entertainment and at the end of his life entered into a marriage of convenience with his lesbian friend Billy Bailey.

== Early life ==
Quaglino was born in Turin, Italy, on 8 November 1894. Sometime in the 1920s, he broke with his family and settled in Cagnes-sur-Mer, on the French Riviera, an area known for its connection to motor racing and it may have been motor racing that facilitated his introduction to the glamorous people with whom he mingled. He competed in the Biarritz-St Moritz rally on 15–19 August 1929 in a Fiat 520 Roadster and probably competed in other races.

== Billy Bailey ==
Quaglino stayed in the south of France during the Second World War and according to John Jarvis-Smith worked in the resistance. It may be there that he met Frances Rachel Bailey, known as "Billy", whom he married just before his death. Bailey also left her home in London to live on the Riviera. She was born in 1909 in Belgravia, London, to an upper-class family. Her mother was Lady Gwendolyn Clarendon-Hyde, and her father was Major Francis Bailey. The Scotsman wrote that Billy was a lesbian and speculate that her rejection of her origins may have been related to her sexuality and that she and Quaglino were kindred spirits. Cagnes-sur-Mer had a reputation for bohemianism; later the lesbian nightclub singer Suzy Solidor would live in the town. According to The Scotsman, Bailey was the long-term lover of adventurer and travel writer Barbara Toy.

== Career ==
Quaglino was active as a reporter and photographer of riviera society between the world wars and afterwards up to the 1960s. During his career he photographed artists that included Pablo Picasso, Marc Chagall, and Henri Matisse. Among the actors that he photographed were Brigitte Bardot, Laurel and Hardy, Charlie Chaplin, Orson Welles, Errol Flynn and Sophia Loren. In 1948, Quaglino photographed the marriage of Rita Hayworth to the Prince Aly Khan, and in 1956, he took photographs of the wedding of Grace Kelly to Prince Rainer III of Monaco inside the cathedral and in the Mairie at Monaco, where they went to sign the register, indicating that he had privileged access not granted to other photographers.

== Later life ==
On 13 May 1972, Quaglino and Billy Bailey married in Antibes. Billy's executor, John Jarvis-Smith, speculated that there was a deal between the two whereby Billy would look after Quaglino, who was in poor health, and Billy would be able to claim Quaglino's pension after his death. After Quaglino died at Pollone in around October 1972, the Italian authorities refused to pay the pension however as the couple had not been married the necessary two years. Quaglino's photographs, many never published, passed to Billy and on her death into the control of Jarvis-Smith. They were auctioned in Edinburgh in November 2003 by Lyon & Turnbull.

== See also ==
- Clarendon Hyde
- Maquis du Vercors
