= Ingeborg Mueller Fernlund =

Swedish editor

Rut Ingeborg Maria Mueller Fernlund (28 March 1935 – 30 May 2015) was a Swedish editor-in-chief. For almost 30 years she was the editor-in-chief for the publisher Norstedts. She started working at Norstedts publishers on 1 April 1966. As of 2013, more than 13 years after she reached her retirement age, she continued to work at the publishers. She had her own office on every level of the publishers' building. In 1995, Fernulnd won the Bokbranschens redaktörspris (the book business editors award). In 2006, she was awarded by the Svenska Akademien.
