= Martin Kitcher =

British singer-songwriter (1962–2015)

Martin Kitcher (23 April 1962 – 21 May 2015) was an English singer-songwriter from Bournemouth, Dorset.

A well known character in his home county of Dorset most recently in the local news for declaring Dorset as independent from the UK with its own entry for the Eurovision Song Contest as a protest against Andrew Lloyd Webber's song to be the only entry from the UK to be considered.

Kitcher wrote the soundtrack for the documentary The Final Word, about the Frank Bruno v Joe Bugner 1987 boxing match for the British Commonwealth championship held in White Hart Lane, London.

== History ==
During the punk era in the UK at the age of 15 he formed the “Comic action Heroes”.

In 1979, Kitcher joined Program, a band from New Milton, Hampshire, originally called Product 109. Program were part of the English "post-punk" movement and gained heavy publicity from a campaign waged by Tom Vague by use of Fanzine entitled "Vague". The band gained notoriety and interest but Martin received a severe electric shock while performing on-stage which stalled his career and indeed the growing cult band's too.

In 1982, Kitcher formed a band called “Agagaga” and released 2 albums, Greenworld (1987, Blitz records) and Agamemnon (1990, Dew Records), whilst at the time Kitcher also wrote theme music including a number one theme tune for a video featuring Frank Bruno.

The Martin Kitcher Band recorded a cover of Suspicious Minds for the charity Julia's House.

He also ran MKM Digital which currently has 70+ releases and manages, produces and arranges many acts.

In 2007, Kitcher released an album on CD and MP3 called Eyes to The Left on through his production company.

After a back injury in 2009, he was inactive on the live music scene in Britain since as a result, however he continued in a consultant role for some musical acts including Fitzpain who played at the Royal Albert Hall in London, in 2008, prior to the release of their second single "Perfect World" which he also produced.

Kitcher died on 21 May 2015.
