= Manuel Bernabeu =

Spanish modern pentathlete (1920–2015)

Personal information
- Full name: Manuel Bernabeu Prada
- Born: 13 January 1920 Barcelona, Spain
- Died: 19 May 2015 (aged 95)

Sport
- Sport: Modern pentathlon

Manuel Bernabeu (13 January 1920 – 19 May 2015) was a Spanish modern pentathlete. He competed at the 1948 Summer Olympics.
