= Leif Holger Larsen =

Norwegian diplomat

Personal details
- Born: 27 January 1954; Stavanger, Norway
- Died: 8 May 2015 (aged 61); Gilgit, Pakistan
- Cause of death: Helicopter crash

Leif Holger Larsen (27 January 1954 – 8 May 2015) was a Norwegian diplomat.

He was born in Stavanger, and was a cand.polit. by education. He started working for the Norwegian Ministry of Foreign Affairs in 1984. He was a subdirector in the Ministry from 2000, councillor-minister at the Norwegian NATO delegation from 2001 and head of department in the Ministry of Foreign Affairs from 2005. In 2009 he was appointed as a head teacher at the Norwegian Defence University College.

In 2011 he started serving in South Asia, first as special representative for the Ministry of Foreign Affairs to Afghanistan and Pakistan. He had previously been present during the 2008 Kabul Serena Hotel attack, which claimed the life of a Norwegian journalist, but survived. Larsen served as the Norwegian ambassador to Pakistan from 2014 until he died in a helicopter crash on 8 May 2015 in Gilgit, Pakistan.
