= Rashid Massumi =

Iranian cardiologist

- Born: January 21, 1926; Nain, Iran
- Died: May 29, 2015 (aged 89); Los Angeles, California, U.S.
- Education: Tehran University School of Medicine, George Washington University School of Medicine, Institute for Medical Research at Cedars of Lebanon Hospital.
- Known for: Pioneering research in the field of electrophysiology; bringing modern cardiology to Iran; serving the Shah of Iran.
- Medical career
- Profession: Cardiologist and professor
- Institutions: Cedars-Sinai Medical Center; UCLA Medical Center
- Sub-specialties: Electrophysiology and cardiology

Rashid Abdol Massumi (January 21, 1926 – May 29, 2015) was an Iranian-American cardiologist, and a clinical and academic professor known for early contributions to the field of cardiology.

== General ==
Rashid Ali Massumi was born in Nain, Iran, and died in Los Angeles, California, on May 29, 2015. He was a cardiologist and clinical professor, known for his significant and pioneering contributions to the field of electrophysiology in its early stages in the seventies. In his career he made a multitude of contributions published in peer review journals, and was the cardiologist to the Shah of Iran and his family and later to Ayatollah Khomeini until 1980.

== Education ==
Massumi left Nain for Tehran, Iran at the age of 20 to study medicine at the Tehran University School of Medicine. As valedictorian of his 1950 graduation class, he was rewarded with a government-sponsored 5-year period of postgraduate education in the United States. He completed his internship and residency training at the George Washington University School of Medicine in Washington, D.C. He then completed a two-year fellowship in cardiology at the Institute for Medical Research, Cedars of Lebanon Hospital, under Myron Prinzmetal.

== Early career in America ==
After serving as an instructor in cardiology at Yale University Medical Center from 1957 to 1960, he was invited to establish a modern cardiology laboratory at District of Columbia General Hospital, George Washington University section. During Massumi's tenure as associate professor of medicine at George Washington University and Head of Cardiology at D.C. General Hospital from 1960 to 1970, there were over 50 scientific contributions published in the field of cardiology.

From 1970 to 1974, as Professor of Cardiology at the University of California, Davis School of Medicine, Massumi continued research in the new field of electrophysiology, contributing over 40 original papers published in peer-reviewed journals.

== Return to Iran ==
From 1974 to 1980, Massumi returned to Iran by invitation from the Shah's Court to bring modern cardiology to Iran and establish modern techniques in the 350-bed cardiology center being constructed at the time.

Simultaneously, as Professor and Chief of the Department of Cardiology at Tehran University, Massumi laid the groundwork for an up-to-date teaching center which, to this day, continues to produce qualified cardiologists. The pupils that Massumi has trained at the University of Tehran have become among the most respected cardiologists in Iran and have been the driving force in building ultra-modern cardiac centers in several major cities in the nation. Of these, the most recent center was built in the city of Shiraz in southern Iran in 2008. At the opening ceremonies, Massumi was referred to as the father of modern cardiology in Iran.

The tumult of the 1979 Iranian Revolution led Massumi to decide to take his family back to the United States, where he has continued his career as a preeminent cardiologist since 1980.

== Impact on cardiology ==
During his career, Massumi authored over 200 papers, 130 of which he was senior author, and authoring a chapter in the textbook "Cardiac Arrhythmias" and co-authoring "Complex Electrocardiography". He was a driving force behind the field's understanding of Prinzmetal-Massumi syndrome, a rare form of angina pectoris.

== Final years ==
Prior to his death, Massumi was practicing in Beverly Hills, California and was a member of the staffs of Cedars-Sinai Medical Center, where he lectured regularly, UCLA Medical Center (where he served as a Clinical Professor of Medicine) and Brotman Medical Center. Into his 80s he continued to publish articles, as recently as October 2010 at the age of 84, making him a successful contributor to the academic body of knowledge in the field for seven decades. In June 2009, the cardiology fellows of Cedars-Sinai Medical Center gave Massumi the Lifetime Teaching Award in recognition of "his enduring devotion to the education of Cedars-Sinai Cardiology Fellows".

Massumi's son from his first marriage to Elsie Szabo is the philosopher Brian Massumi.

== Publications ==
- Massumi, Rashid; Shehata, Michael (2010). "Doubling of the Ventricular Rate by Interpolated Junctional Extrasystoles Resembling Supraventricular tachycardia". Pacing and Clinical Electrophysiology. 33 (8): 945–9. doi:10.1111/j.1540-8159.2010.02763.x. PMID 20497352. S2CID 20203141.
- Daly, J. J.; Gray, F. G.; Massumi, R. (1962). "Circulatory Effects of the Valsalva Maneuver in Emphysema and the Influence of Ganglionic Blockade". Chest. 41: 34–40. doi:10.1378/chest.41.1.34. PMID 13883263.
- Wenger, R; Massumi, RA; Kuramoto, K (1955). "A comparative study of esophageal and direct auricular electrocardiography in dog". Cardiologia. 26 (4): 193–208. doi:10.1159/000165490. PMID 14379202.
