= Burhan Muhammad =

Indonesian diplomat

Burhan Muhammad (3 August 1957 – 19 May 2015) was an Indonesian diplomat. From 14 November 2012 until his death, he was the Ambassador to Pakistan. He was born in Yogyakarta.

Muhammad was badly burned and injured in a helicopter crash in Naltar, Gilgit-Baltistan, Pakistan on 8 May 2015. He later died at a hospital in Singapore, aged 57.
