= 2015 Pakistan Army Mil Mi-17 crash =

Aviation accident in Pakistan

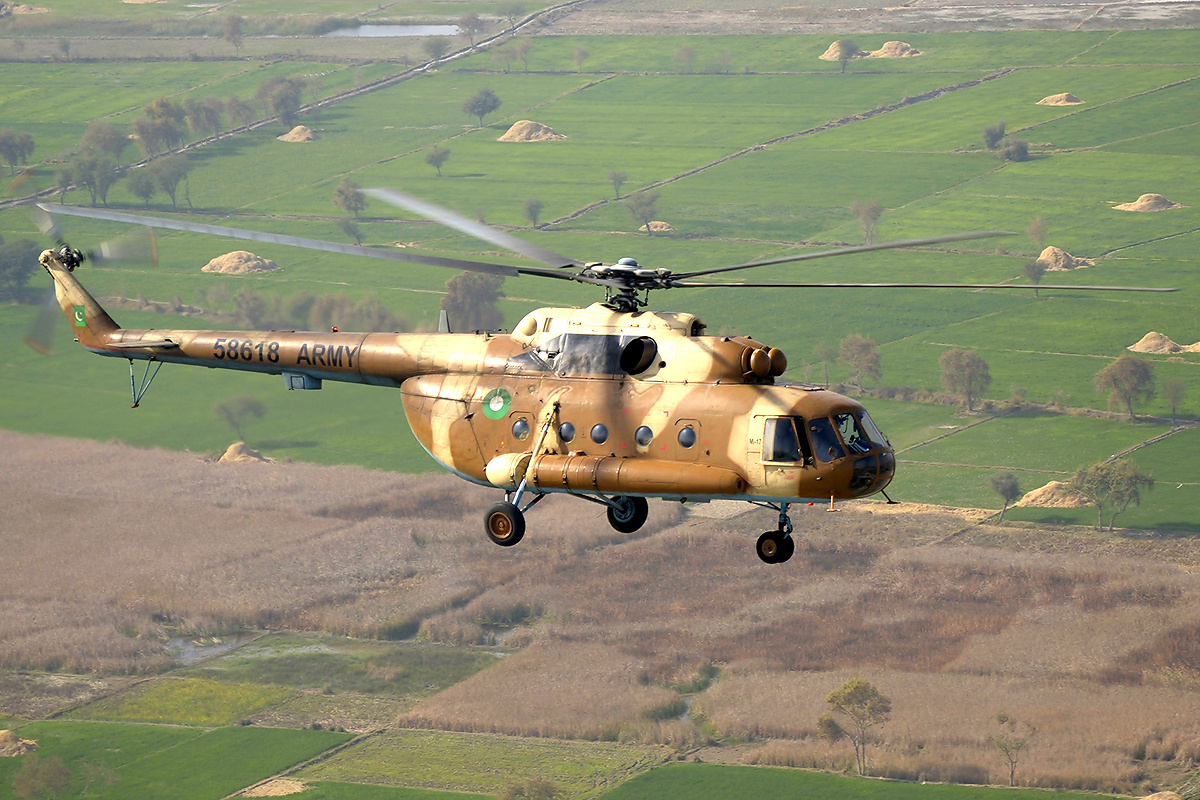
- A Pakistan Army Mil Mi-17 similar to the aircraft involved in the accident

Accident
- Date: 8 May 2015
- Summary: Loss of control due to mechanical failure
- Site: Naltar, Gilgit-Baltistan, Pakistan

Aircraft
- Aircraft type: Mil Mi-17
- Operator: Pakistan Army Aviation Corps
- Flight origin: Gilgit Airport, Pakistan
- Destination: Naltar Valley, Pakistan
- Occupants: 20
- Passengers: 17
- Crew: 3
- Fatalities: 8
- Injuries: 11
- Survivors: 12

On 8 May 2015, a Mil MI-17 transport helicopter of the Pakistan Army Aviation Corps crashed in Naltar, in the Gilgit District of the Gilgit-Baltistan region of northern Pakistan, killing eight people. Among the victims were the ambassadors of Norway, Indonesia and the Philippines to Pakistan, as well as the spouses of the Indonesian and Malaysian ambassadors to Pakistan, and three crew.

Government officials and international dignitaries were travelling to the Naltar Valley where the Prime Minister was hosting lunch for the members of the diplomatic corps. Prime Minister Nawaz Sharif was scheduled to travel by fixed-wing aircraft, while 32 foreign diplomats and their spouses as well as 25 other Pakistanis were flown in from Islamabad to Gilgit Airport hours earlier, from where a flight of four helicopters was scheduled to transport them to nearby Naltar. Two of the helicopters had already landed at the time of the incident. The helicopter lost control and crashed while landing; the crash has been attributed to mechanical failure of the helicopter's tail rotor.

== Background ==
Location of Gilgit-Baltistan in Pakistan

The Pakistani dignitaries and international diplomats from 37 countries along with their families were on a three-day visit to Gilgit-Baltistan as part of the efforts of the Government to showcase the beauty and culture of Northern Areas. The programme included Lunch by the Prime Minister at Naltar, visits to Hunza, Altit Fort, Baltit Fort, Atabad Lake and Phunder Lake including cultural/sports activities. The delegation had been flown in from Nur Khan Air Force base in Islamabad to Gilgit Airport via Pakistan Air Force's C-130 transport aircraft, arriving earlier in the morning. From Gilgit Airport, the delegation was scheduled to be ferried via a convoy of three Pakistan Army's Mil Mi-17 helicopters to Naltar Valley, located 45 km from Gilgit. Naltar is part of the Karakoram mountain range and is the oldest ski resort in the country, located at 10,000 feet. At the time of the incident, the two other helicopters carrying delegation members had already landed.

== Accident ==
The helicopter crash landed into the roof of an Army Public School building in Naltar while it was preparing to land at the helipad nearby. A local farmer who lived about 100 metres away from the school told Reuters that the school was closed at the time of the crash. According to eyewitnesses, while the helicopter was landing, it lost control, began swinging, whirling and stalled mid-air, and dropped suddenly, crashing onto the school building roof. The crash was followed by an explosion and the helicopter caught fire, followed by the school building. Police and emergency medics rushed to the site, breaking the helicopter windows and dragged people out for evacuation. An explosion occurred a few minutes later injured some medics. The injured were immediately air lifted to the local Combined Military Hospital. The Police cordoned off the area, following up on security arrangements which had been made three days earlier ahead of the Prime Minister's visit.

Prime Minister Nawaz Sharif, who was on a plane and en route to Gilgit upon hearing of the incident, cancelled his trip and returned to Islamabad. The Ministry of Foreign Affairs tasked the Crisis Management Cell with inquiries on the crash. The incident was the worst aviation accident in the country since the Bhoja Air's Flight 213 crash in 2012, which resulted in 127 deaths. It was also the most serious aviation accident involving the deaths of dignitaries since the 1988 Pakistan One C-130 crash, which killed President Zia-ul-Haq, American ambassador Arnold Raphel and other key American officials. Previously, there have been four Mi-17 helicopter crashes in Pakistan, including three minor ones in 2004, 2007 and 2012, and a major one in 2009.

== Victims ==
Casualties by nationality
| Country | Deaths | Injuries | Ref. |
|---|---|---|---|
| Pakistan | 3 | 6 | |
| Norway | 1 | 0 | |
| Malaysia | 1 | 1 | |
| Poland | 0 | 1 | |
| Indonesia | 2 | 0 | |
| Netherlands | 0 | 1 | |
| South Africa | 0 | 1 | |
| Romania | 0 | 1 | |
| Philippines | 1 | 0 | |
| Total | 9 | 11 | |

The helicopter was carrying a total of 17 passengers and three crew. Of the passengers, 11 were foreigners and six were Pakistanis. Eight people died in the crash: the two pilots (Major Altamash and Major Faisal), a crew member (Naib Subedar Zakir), three ambassadors – Leif Larsen of Norway, Domingo Lucenario of the Philippines, and Burhan Muhammad of Indonesia (the latter dying of his wounds on 19 May), as well as the spouses of the high commissioner of Malaysia and ambassador of Indonesia, Habibah Mahmud, and Heri Listyawati Burhan Muhammad respectively.

The ambassadors of Poland (Andrzej Ananicz), the Netherlands (Marcel de Vink), and Romania (Emilian Ion) and the high commissioners of Malaysia (Hasrul Sani Mujtabar) and South Africa (Mpendulo Jele) were among the wounded, suffering minor to critical injuries. The casualties' names were released by the Director General of the Inter-Services Public Relations (ISPR), Major-General Asim Bajwa.

== Investigation ==
The helicopter crash was attributed to technical and mechanical fault, indicated by the air force inquiries. Initial military reports suggested engine failure. Developing reports later revealed a failure in the helicopter's tail rotor while it was landing, which caused it to lose control and crash. The black box was recovered. According to Foreign secretary Aizaz Ahmad, "It was purely an accident, and accidents do happen." Ahmad added that the helicopter was serviced regularly, with the last service taking place 11 hours before the crash. The Chief of Army Staff and Chief of Air Staff constituted a military board of inquiry, the results of which would be made available to the public.

One air force official explained how due to mountain ranges the region was an extremely difficult terrain for helicopter flights, adding "It was close to landing when it started to spin. So, most probably it is a tail rotor malfunction." Testaments by the Chief of Air Staff Air Chief Marshal Suhail Aman stated that the behavior of the helicopter was normal before landing and the pilots had contact with the base commander. The helicopter suddenly lost control due to mechanical failure moments before it was about to land. Air Chief Marshal Aman added that the pilots were "proficient and excellent" and had experience with flights in the area.

== Aftermath ==
Prime Minister Nawaz Sharif declared the following Saturday a national day of mourning, during which the national flag was lowered to half-mast, and expressed "deep grief and sorrow over the tragic incident", and said he "extended heartfelt condolences to those who lost their lives in this incident." The Chief of Army Staff, General Raheel Sharif, expressed his "deepest grief" at the incident, stating: "it is a sad day for all of us and our heart goes out to the bereaved families at this sad moment of their life." The Chief Minister of Gilgit-Baltistan Shah Jehan Mir also expressed shock and visited the hospital to inquire about the injured. Condolences also poured in from throughout the country and internationally.

Pakistani authorities ruled out the possibility of a terror attack, following up on a claim by the militant group Tehreek-e-Taliban that it had downed the helicopter with an anti-aircraft missile, stating its target to be the Prime Minister. This claim was promptly dismissed as "bogus" by foreign secretary Aizaz Ahmad Chaudhry, who confirmed that the accident occurred due to a technical fault, adding that full security arrangements had been in place and Taliban groups did not operate in the region. The Pakistani military also ruled out terrorism as a cause of the crash. Eyewitnesses and other diplomats present on the ground confirmed that the aircraft was not hit or shot down.

The Pakistan Air Force started an inquiry into the crash. Pakistani government representatives promised a transparent and full inquiry to investigate the crash from all angles. The Prime Minister and Pakistani government also contacted the governments of Norway, Philippines, Indonesia and Malaysia to offer condolences over the tragedy and discuss details of the crash. Nawaz Sharif directed four federal ministers, Abdul Qadir Baloch, Khurram Dastgir Khan, Rana Tanveer Hussain and Balighur Rehman to accompany the dead bodies with full honors on special flights to Norway, the Philippines, Indonesia and Malaysia respectively.

A day later, the injured and the bodies of the dead were transported by Pakistan Air Force aircraft back to the Nur Khan Airbase in Islamabad. They were received by top civil and military officials at the airbase, and the dead bodies were accorded military honors and protocol. The Chief of Army Staff condoled with relatives and diplomats at the airbase.

In a special Condolence Meeting at the Ministry of Foreign Affairs after the incident, also attended by the diplomatic community in Islamabad, Prime Minister Nawaz Sharif recommended bestowing the civil award Sitara-e-Pakistan on those who died. The Indonesian Ambassador, who received critical burns, was transported to Singapore via a Singaporean air ambulance. The Dutch ambassador was also flown back to his country.

== See also ==
- 2009 Pakistan Army Mil Mi-17 crash
