= Nick Mead (Royal Navy officer) =

Nick Mead

Frederick Nicolas Mead (19 March 1922 – 2 May 2015) was a Royal Navy officer of the Second World War who sank two U-boats. In May 1943 he sank U-89 for which he was awarded the Distinguished Service Cross. In April 1945, Mead, as officer on watch on the bridge of the anti-submarine destroyer HMS Watchman, ordered the measures that sank U-1195 for which he received a bar to his DSC.
