= Eric Caidin =

American collector of film memorabilia

- Born: December 7, 1952; Los Angeles, California, United States
- Died: May 18, 2015 (aged 62); Palm Springs, California, United States
- Occupation(s): Collector, business owner

Eric Caidin (December 7, 1952 – May 18, 2015) was an American collector of film memorabilia and owner of the Hollywood Book and Poster Company that he operated in various locales near or on Hollywood Boulevard from 1977 until it closed in 2015. Directors Quentin Tarantino, John Landis, J. J. Abrams and Joe Dante were among regulars who often browsed the racks of Caidin's eclectic movie memorabilia collection.

Caidin was also the cofounder of the Grindhouse Film Festival at New Beverly Cinema. Caidin died in Palm Springs at age 62.
