= Ed Fouhy =

- Born: November 30, 1934; Boston, Massachusetts, United States
- Died: May 13, 2015 (aged 80); Chatham, Massachusetts, United States
- Occupation(s): Journalist and television news executive
- Spouse: Barbara Fouhy

Edward Fouhy (November 30, 1934 – May 13, 2015) was an American journalist and television news executive.

== Biography ==
Fouhy was born in Boston on November 30, 1934, and grew up in neighboring Milton. His father, Joseph, was a payroll clerk at Fore River Shipyard in Quincy. His mother Mary was a medical secretary at Massachusetts General Hospital. He was graduated in 1956 on University of Massachusetts in Amherst. He launched his broadcast career as news director for WBZ-TV. He was starting as producer of CBS Morning News in 1966.
