= Naltar =

Nalter may refer to various places in Pakistan:

- Naltar Valley
- Naltar Lakes
- Naltar Peak
- Naltar Pass
- Naltar Wildlife Sanctuary
- Naltar River, which joins the Hunza River
