= List of mountain passes in Pakistan =

The following is a list of mountain passes in Pakistan:

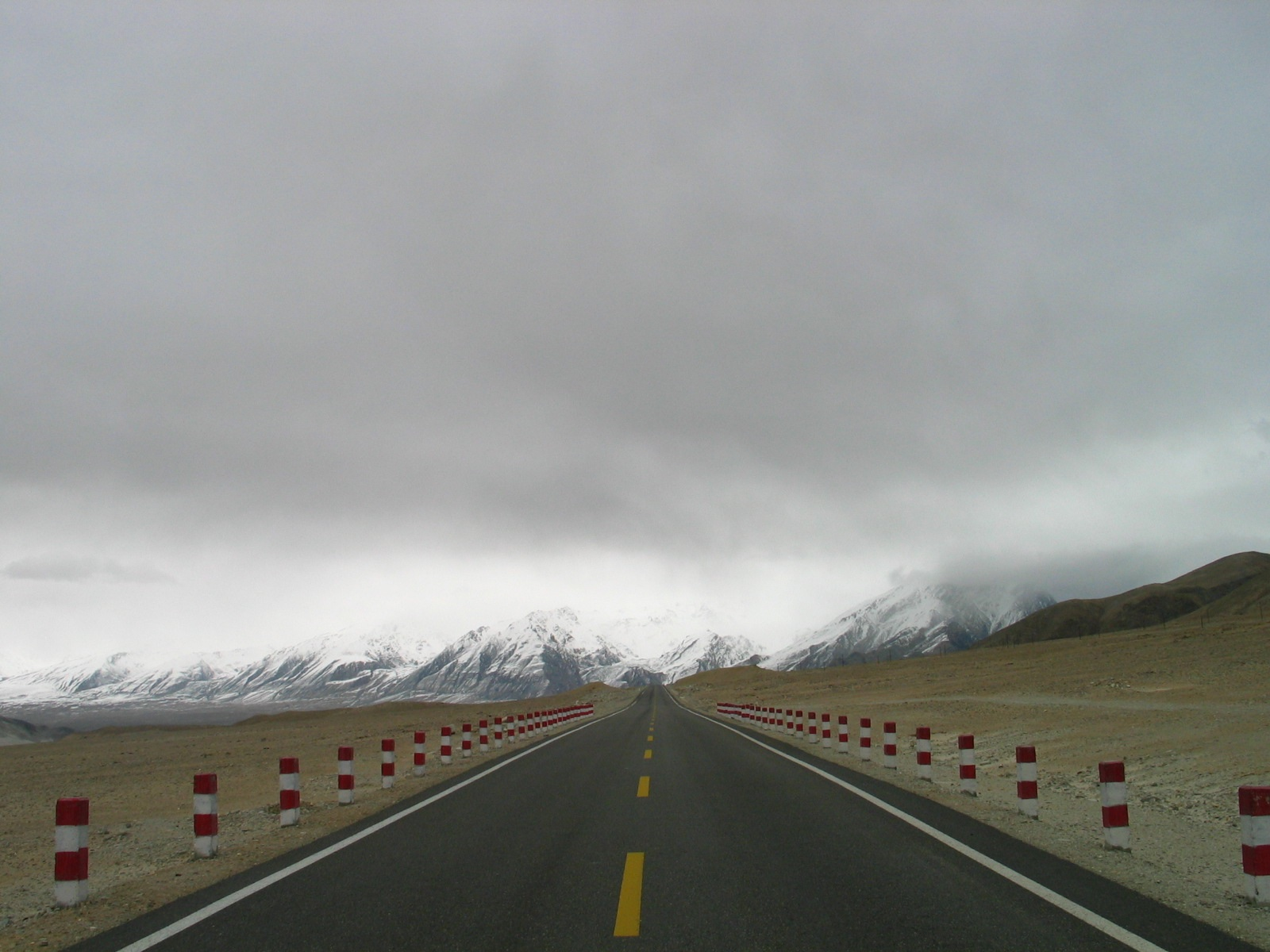
Khunjerab Pass is the highest pass in Pakistan

== List of Passes ==
Portrait	Name	Elevation	Connects	Location
	Khunjerab Pass	4,693 m (15,397 ft)	Pakistan - China	Hunza, Gilgit-Baltistan
	Babusar Pass	4,173 m (13,691 ft)	Khyber Pakhtunkhwa to Gilgit Baltista	
	Burzil Pass	4,100 m (13,451 ft)		
	Bolan Pass	1,793 m (5,884 ft)	Sibi with Quetta	Balochistan
	Khyber Pass	1,070 m (3,510 ft)	Pakistan - Afghanistan	Landi Kotal, Khyber Pakhtunkhwa
	Mustagh Pass	6,013-meter (19,728 ft)		
	Bashkaro Pass	4,924 m (16,155 ft)		
	Broghil Pass	3,798 m (12,460 ft)		
	Chaprot Pass	4,900 m (16,076 ft)		
	Peiwar Pass			
	Dorah Pass	4,300 m (14,108 ft)		
	Gondogoro Pass	5,585 m (18,323 ft)		
	Gumal Pass			
	Hayal Pass	4,700 m (15,420 ft)		
	Hispar Pass	5,128 m (16,824 ft)		
	Irshad Pass			
	Karakar Pass	4,977 m (16,329 ft)		
	Khojak Pass	2,290 m (7,512 ft)		
	Kurram Pass			
	Kilik Pass	4,827 metres (15,837 ft)		
	Kohat Pass			
	Lowari Pass	3,118 m (10,230 ft)		
	Lupghar Pir Pass	5,190 m (17,030 ft)		
	Malakand Pass	1,362 m (4,468 ft)		
	Mintaka Pass	4,709 m (15,449 ft)		
	Naltar Pass	4,600 m (15,092 ft)		
	Badawi Pass	3,523m		
	Shandur Pass	3,700 m (12,139 ft)		
	Tochi Pass		Bannu- ghazni	KPK
	Didrilli Pass	5030m		
	Zargar Pass			
