= Snow Dome, Chaprot =

Mountain in Chaprot, Pakistan

Snow Dome
- Location within Pakistan

Highest point
- Elevation: 5,029 m (16,499 ft)
- Listing: List of mountains in Pakistan
- Coordinates: 36°18′5.51″N 74°08′49.64″E

Geography
- Location: Chaprot Pass, Pakistan
- Parent range: Karakoram

Snow Dome is a mountain in the Karakoram range in the Chaprot Pass region of Gilgit–Baltistan of Pakistan. It lies to the southeast of Daintar Pass and north of Mehrbani Peak (5,639 m) which is in the Naltar Valley. Another peak, near Concordia, is also called Snow Dome, though the one near Concordia is significantly higher at 7,150 m.

== See also ==
- List of highest mountains
