= Shani (disambiguation) =

Shani is one of the Navagraha (the nine primary celestial beings) in Hindu astrology. It may also refer to:

== People ==
=== Given name ===
- Shani Arshad, Pakistani musician
- Shani Bakanov (born 2006), Israeli world champion rhythmic gymnast
- Shani Bloch (born 1979), Israeli Olympic racing cyclist
- Shani Cooper, Israeli diplomat
- Shani David (born 1991), Israeli soccer player
- Shani Davis (born 1982), American speed skater
- Shani Indira Natio (born 1998), Indonesian singer and dancer, member of the idol group JKT48
- Shani Kedmi (born 1977), Israeli Olympic competitive sailor
- Shani Mahadevappa (1933–2021), Indian actor
- Shani Mootoo (born 1958), Canadian writer
- Shani Rigsbee, American singer-songwriter
- Shani Wallis (born 1933), English actress and singer

=== Surname ===
- Ehud Shani (born 1957), general in the Israel Defense Forces and currently Head of C4I and Senior Field Commander
- Lahav Shani (born 1989), Israeli conductor
- Michael Shani, Israeli cellist and conductor
- Mordechai Shani, Israeli physician and Director General of the Sheba Medical Center
- Shaul Shani (born c. 1955), Israeli billionaire businessman and investor

== Fictional characters ==
- Shani, in The Witcher novels and video games
- Shani, the Hindu deity, in Karmaphal Daata Shani, an Indian TV series
- Shani, in the 2019 Indian animated series Chacha Chaudhary

== Places ==
- Mount Shani, a mountain in the Caucasus
- Shani Peak, a mountain in the south of Naltar Pass in the Gilgit District of Northern Areas of Pakistan
- Shani Glacier, a glacier in the north of Shani Peak in Naltar Valley, Pakistan
- Shani, Nigeria, a local government area of Kano State
- Livne, an Israeli settlement also known as Shani
- Shani Shingnapur, a village in India dedicated to the Hindu god Shani

== Other uses ==
- Shani (drink), a soft drink brand of PepsiCo
- Shani (1989 film), 1989 Pakistani film by Saeed Rizvi
- The Marvelous World of Shani or simply Shani, a short-lived doll line from Mattel featuring African American characters
- Aerodyne Shani, a French two-place paraglider design

== See also ==
- Schani, family nickname for composer Johann Strauss II
- Sani people, an ethnic minority in Yunnan, China, classified as a branch of the Yi people by the Chinese government
- Seni, an ancient Egyptian viceroy of Kush
