= Shoni =

Shoni may refer to:

== Places ==
- Shoni Bay, Red Sea Riviera, Egypt
- Shaughnessy Village ("Shoni" for short), Montreal, Quebec, Canada

== People ==
- Shōni clan, a family of Japanese nobles
- Shoni Jones, Welsh soccer player
- Shoni Schimmel (born 1992), U.S. basketball player
- Shoni Sguborfawr (1811–1858), Welsh criminal

== See also ==
- Shani (disambiguation)
- Shonia
