= Jagot =

Jagot (English: /ˈdʒeɪɡoʊ/, French: [ʒaɡo]) is a surname. Notable people with the surname include:

- Grégoire Jagot (1750–1838), French politician
- Jayne Jagot (born 1965), Australian judge
- Paul-Clément Jagot (1889–1962), French occultist

== See also ==
- Jagot colony, settlement in Pakistan
