= Malam Jabba =

Coordinates: 34°47′59″N 72°34′18″E

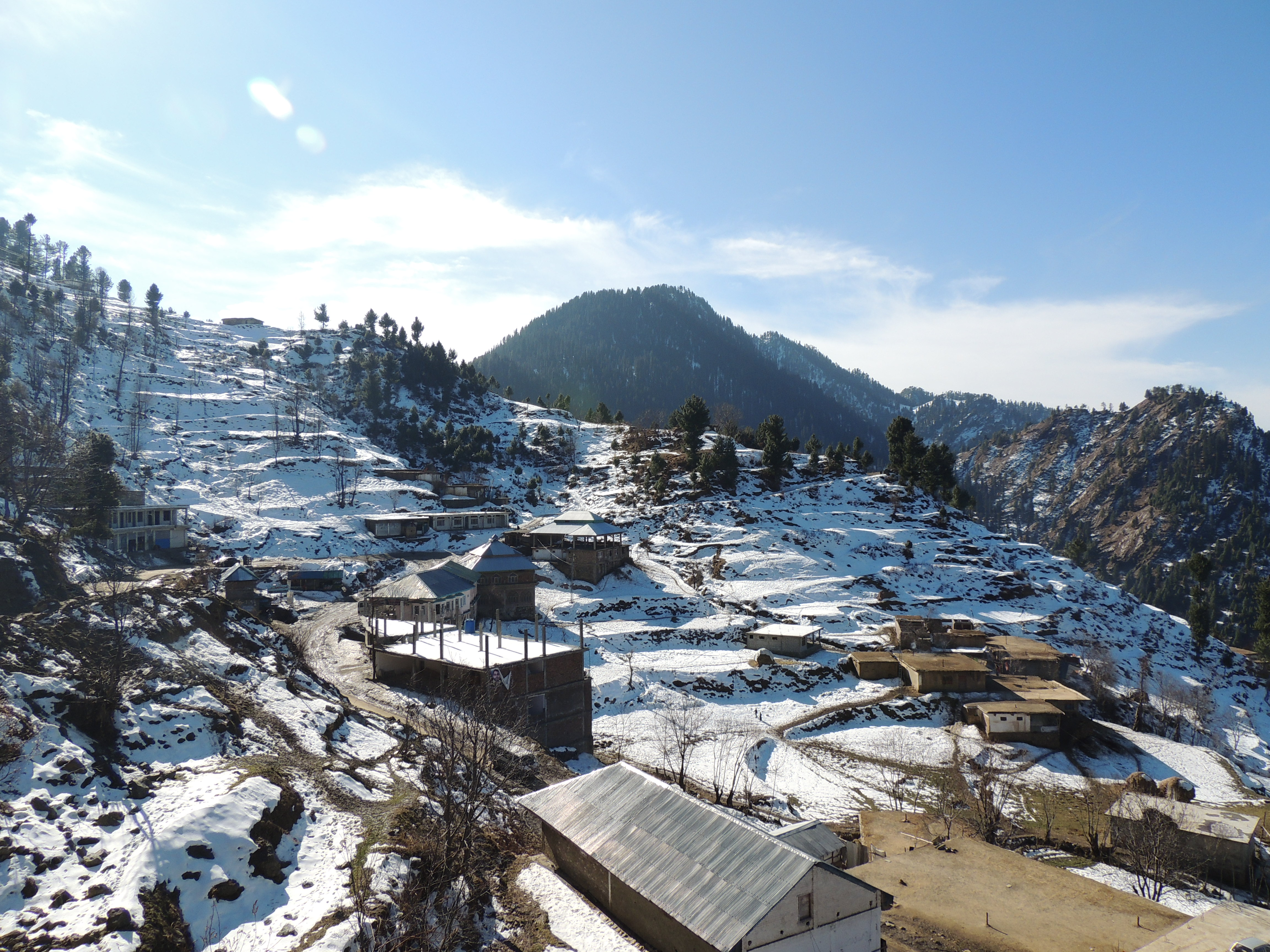
- Malam Jabba, Swat Valley
- Interactive map of Malam Jabba
- Country: Khyber Pakhtunkhwa
- District: Swat

Malam Jabba (also Maalam Jabba, Urdu: مالم جبہ) is a hill station and ski resort in Pakistan found in the Hindu Kush mountain range. It is located nearly 40 km from Saidu Sharif in the Swat Valley of the Khyber Pakhtunkhwa and 314 km from Islamabad.

== Description ==
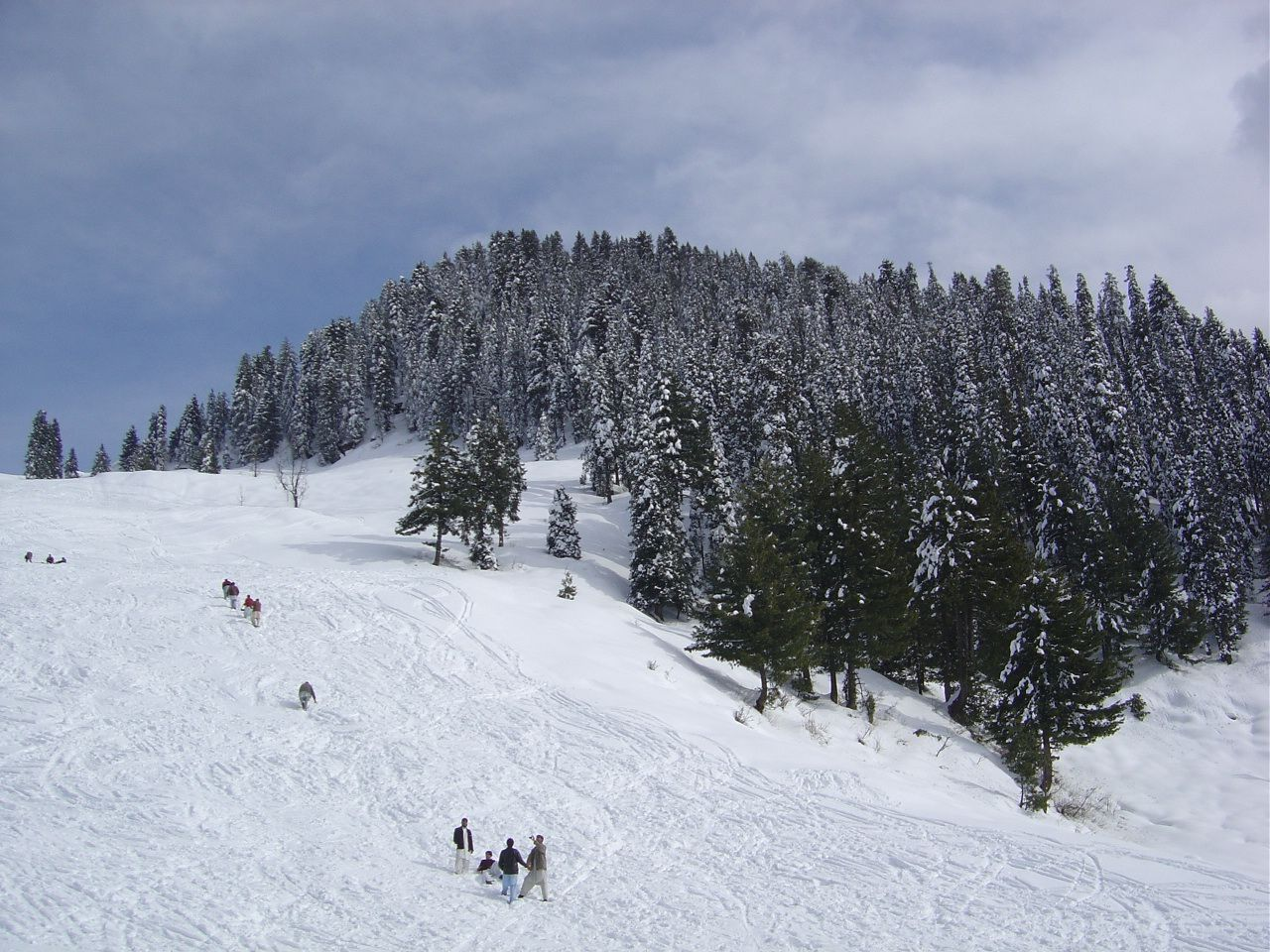
Ski Slope in Malam Jabba, Swat Valley

Malam Jabba is home to one of the two ski resorts in Pakistan, the other being situated in Naltar, Gilgit Baltistan. Along the main Madyan-Kalam road, a pivotal juncture emerges at Manglor town, approximately 12 km from Saidu Sharif. Here, the route takes a divergent path, veering towards the Malam-Jabba Dara. There are several settlements, such as Salanda, Jehanabad, Talegraam, Badar, Ser, Malam, Kishora, Spine Oba, culminating in Jabba.

The village of Malam, positioned prior to Kishora village on the principal Malam-Jabba route, is situated at an approximate distance of 17 km from Manglor. Continuing along the trajectory, Kishora Village materializes 18 km further. Ascending yet higher, Jabba emerges as the zenith of this expansive Dara or gorge, standing 12 km from Kishora.

The Malam Jabba Ski Resort, owned by the Pakistan Tourism Development Corporation, occupies a central role in the area. Noteworthy for its ski slope extending over 800 meters, the resort's apex rests at an elevation of 2804 m (9200 ft) above sea level. This ski resort is the fruit of collaborative efforts between Pakistan and its Austrian counterpart. The resort was equipped with modern facilities including roller/ice-skating rinks, chair lifts, skiing platforms, telephones and snow clearing equipment. There was a wooden motel which had been built to house the construction workers of the ski slope and then opened to the public.

== 2008 Taliban attack ==
The resort was destroyed by Taliban militants in June 2008 during the War in North-West Pakistan when they held Swat Valley. A large portion of the resort was reduced to ashes, including the hotel, several houses and the chairlift.

== 2016 reconstruction and reopening ==
After government restored control in the area, the Government of Khyber Pakhtunkhwa awarded the rebuilding to a private company, which restored the hotel, the ski resort and other facilities. A five star hotel with 76 rooms was opened by Pearl-Continental Hotels & Resorts in 2020. A new 800 meter long ski chairlift was inaugurated in September 2016.

== See also ==
- Miandam
- Naltar ski resort
- Saidu Sharif
- Swat Valley
