= Hayal Pass =

Pakistani mountain pass

- Interactive map of Hayal Pass
- Elevation: 4,700 metres (15,400 ft)

Third Approach
- Location: Pakistan
- Coordinates: 36°19′56″N 73°59′42″E

Hayal Pass (el. 4700 m) is a high mountain pass to the north of Shani Peak in the Naltar Valley of northern Pakistan. The pass lies in the west of Naltar Pass.

== See also ==
- Naltar Valley
