= Naltar Wildlife Sanctuary =

Wildlife in Gilgit-Baltistan, Pakistan

The Naltar Wildlife Sanctuary is a protected area located in the Naltar Valley near Nomal, in Gilgit-Baltistan, Pakistan. The sanctuary was created on 22 November 1975 and consists of a steep-sided forested valley with high mountains on either side. The sanctuary is home to a number of large mammals, including a small number of Astor markhor.

== Location ==
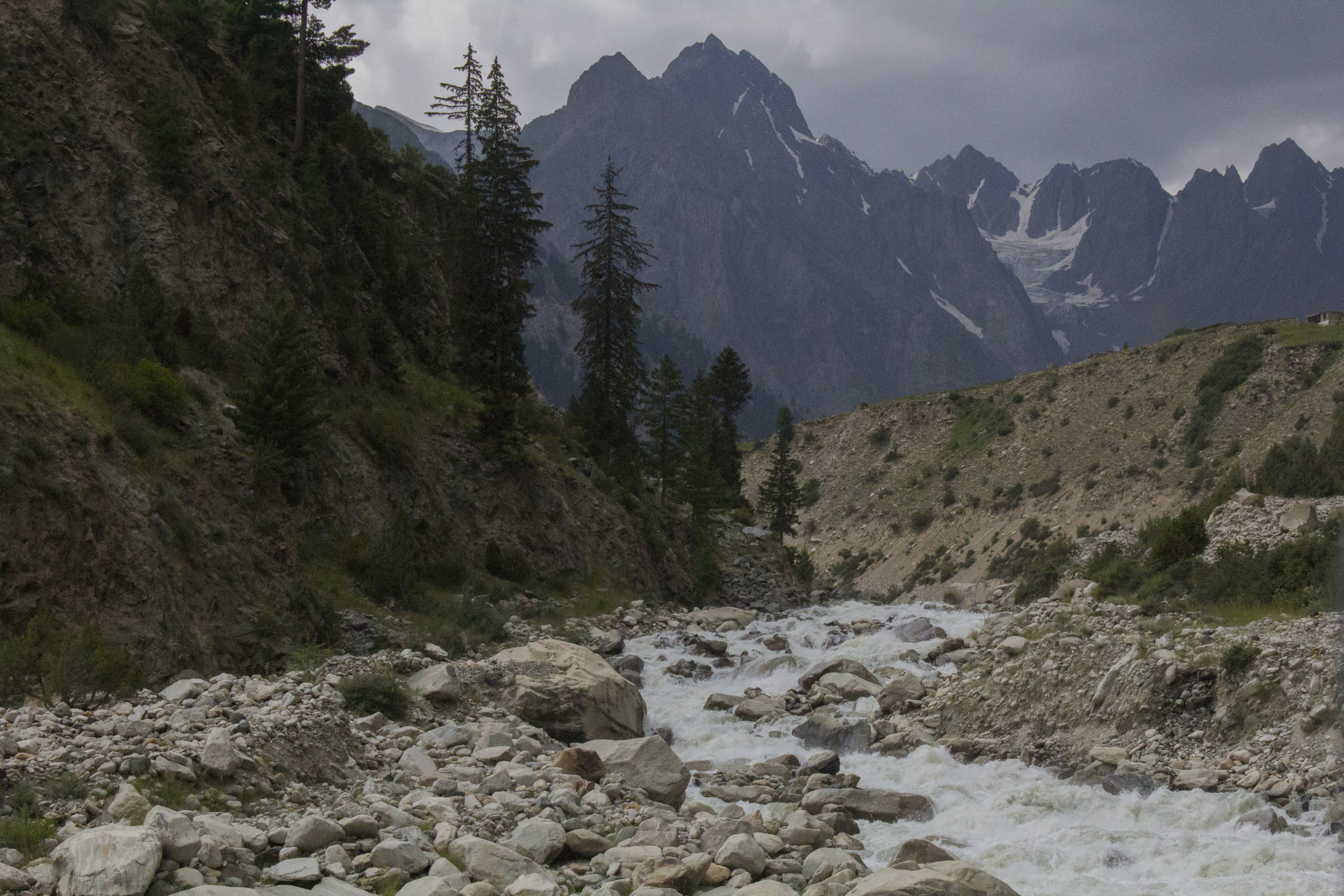
Naltar Valley

Naltar Wildlife Sanctuary is situated in Naltar Valley close to Hunza Valley, a mountainous valley in the Gilgit-Baltistan region of Pakistan, about 45 km (28 mi) from the city of Gilgit.

== The sanctuary ==
Naltar Wildlife Sanctuary was designated as a protected area on 22 November 1975. It occupies an area of 27,206 hectares (67,230 acres) and adjoins two other protected areas, Sher Quillah Game Reserve and Pakora Game Reserve, the total area of all three being over 50,000 hectares (120,000 acres). Naltar Valley is a fluvio-glacial valley with a U-shaped cross section higher up and a V-shaped cross section lower down. It is aligned from northwest to southeast and has high mountains on either side. The sanctuary extends from the valley floor up to 5,900 m (19,400 ft) at Shani Glacier. The precipitation varies between 254 and 381 mm (10 and 15 in) and the winters are very cold, with the higher reaches of the river freezing.

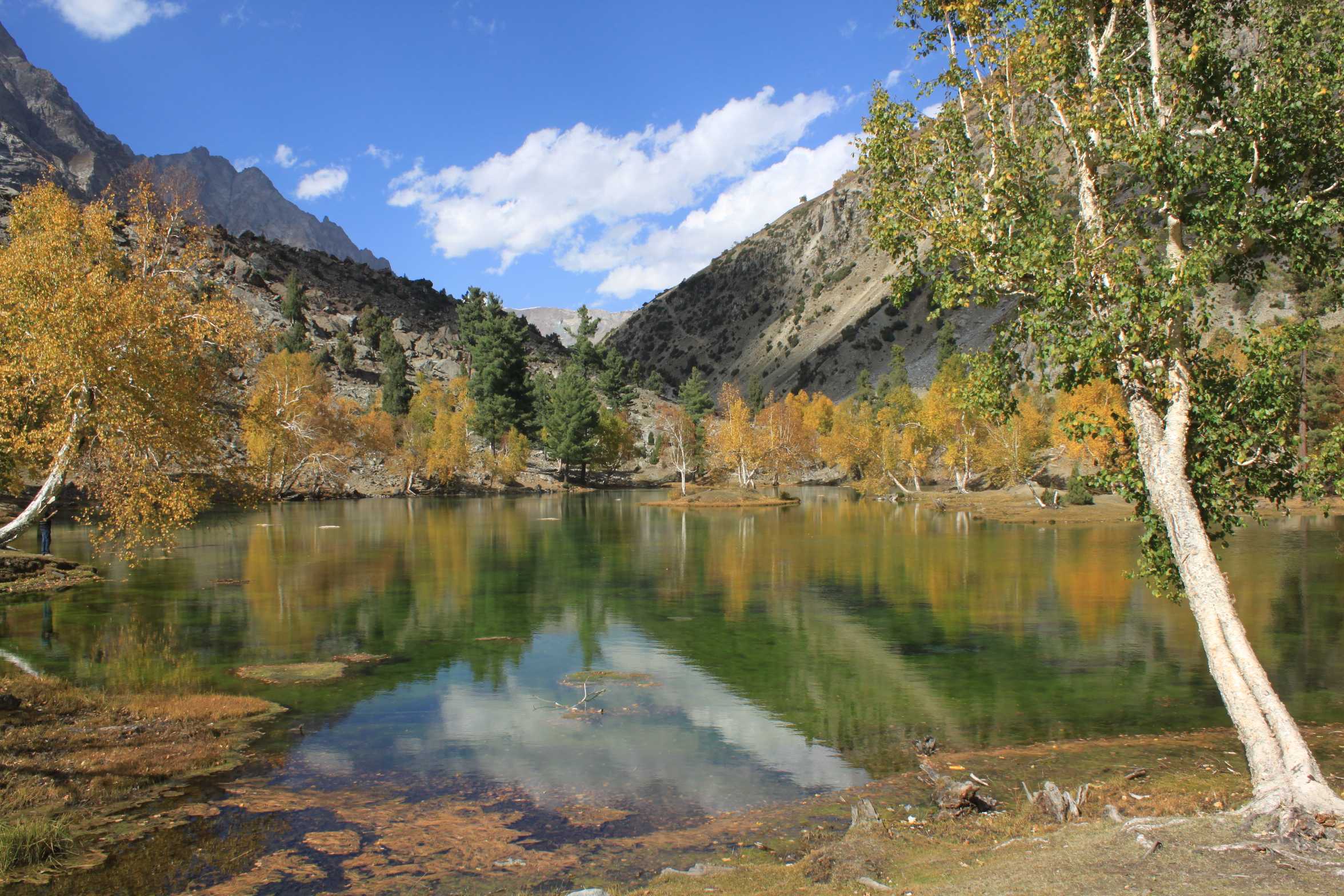
Naltar valley

== Flora ==
The sanctuary is forested, with a luxurious growth of mixed montane broadleaf and coniferous forest at lower altitudes, and montane coniferous forest higher up. Coniferous species present include Picea and Juniperus. Deciduous trees present include Fraxinus, Olea, Pistacia, Sageretia, Betula, Salix, Populus and Krascheninnikovia ceratoides. Herbs present include Artemisia, Haloxylon and Stipa.

== Fauna ==
A small number of Astor markhor (Capra falconeri falconeri), an endangered species of wild goat, lives in the reserve. Other large mammals present include the Alpine ibex (Capra ibex), the snow leopard (Panthera uncia), the brown bear (Ursus arctos), the grey wolf (Lupus lupus), the red fox (Vulpes vulpes), the beech marten (Martes foina) and the leopard cat (Prionailurus bengalensis). About 35 species of bird have been recorded in the sanctuary, including the Brooks's leaf-warbler (Phylloscopus subviridis).
