= Daintar Pass =

Mountain pass in Pakistan

- Interactive map of Daintar Pass
- Elevation: 5,000 m (16,000 ft)

Location
- Location: Pakistan
- Range: Hindukush Mountains
- Coordinates: 36°21′37″N 74°03′52″E

Daintar Pass is a mountain pass to the northeast of Mehrbani Peak northwest of Chaprote, in the Gilgit-Baltistan region in Pakistan. This pass is at an elevation of 16,390 feet (5,000 m).
