= Minawar =

- Village
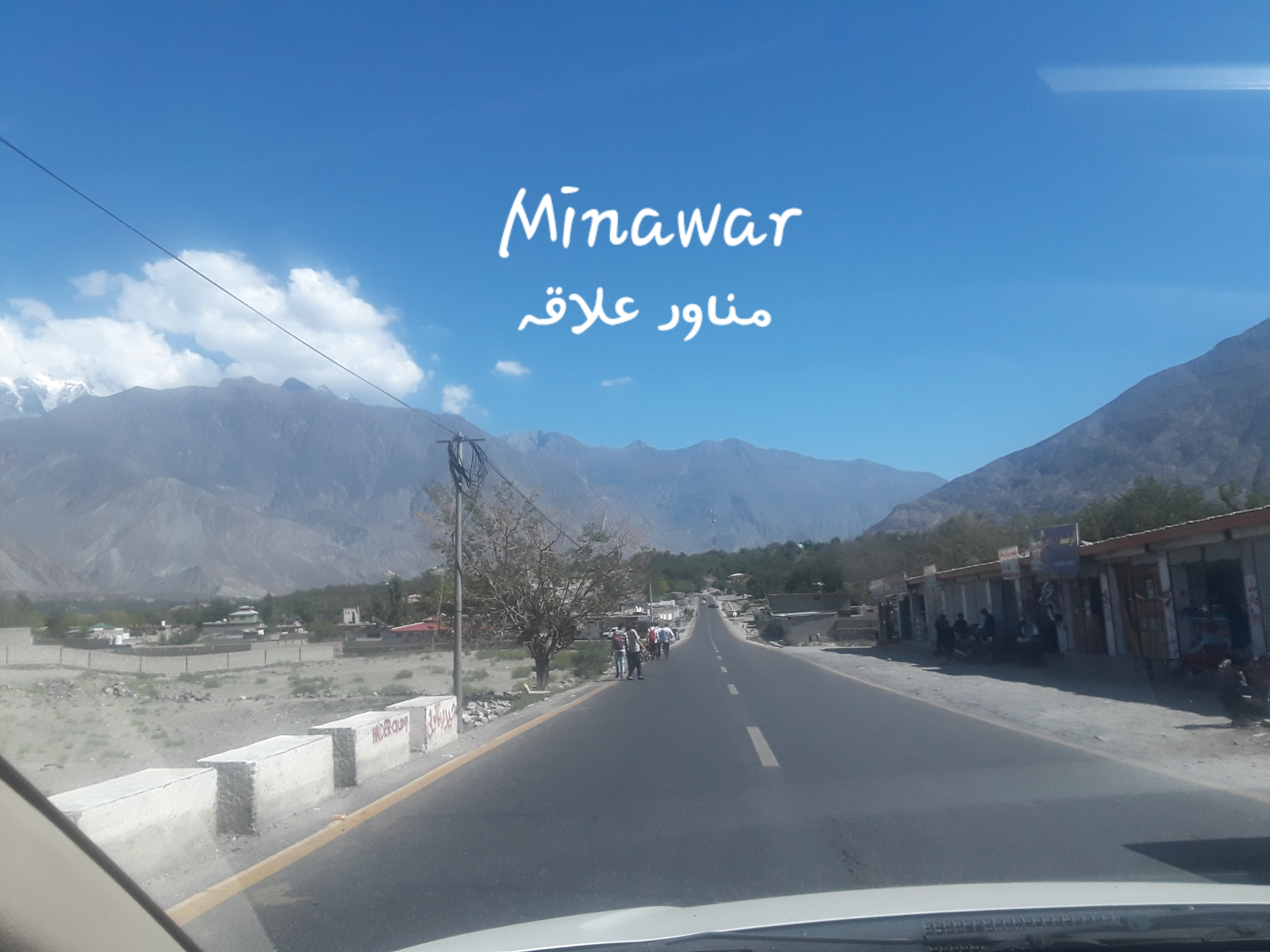

- Location in Pakistan
- Coordinates: 35.876°N 74.436°E
- Country: Pakistan
- Political entity: Gilgit–Baltistan
- Division: Gilgit
- District: Gilgit
- Tehsil: Gilgit
- Elevation: 1,500 m (4,900 ft)

Population
  - Total: 1,000
- Time zone: UTC+5:30 (PST)
  - Summer (DST): +5
- Postal code: 15100

Minawar is a village located 8.5 kilometres (5.3 mi) from the city of Gilgit in the northern area of Pakistan, in the Kashmir region. The population of the village is about 300 families. In Minawar there are a middle school and a high school for about 450 students.

== Geography and climate ==
The village is on the Karakoram Highway, the main road for expeditions to Karakoram.

The surrounding mountains create sharp variations in weather, and the temperatures can sometimes be very hot in the summer during the day, but are always cold at night.
