= Chaprot Pass =

Pakistani mountain pass

Chaprot Pass درہ چھپروٹ
- Interactive map of Chaprot Pass درہ چھپروٹ
- Elevation: 4,900 m (16,100 ft)

Location
- Location: Pakistan
- Range: Hindukush Mountains
- Coordinates: 36°17′24″N 74°08′52″E

Chaprot Pass (Urdu: درہ چھپروٹ) is a mountain pass situated northeast of Mehrbani Peak, in the northwest of Chaprote, Nagar District, Gilgit-Baltistan, Pakistan. The pass is at an elevation of 16,090 feet (4,900 m) and serves as a connection between Chaprot and the Naltar Valley to the west.
