= Shani Glacier =

Glacier in Pakistan

- Location within Karakoram Location within Gilgit Baltistan Location within Pakistan
- Interactive map of Shani Glacier
- Location: Gilgit-Baltistan, Pakistan
- Coordinates: 36°19′N 74°05′E

Shani Glacier (Urdu: شانی گلیشیر) is a glacier in the north of Shani Peak (5,887 m (19,314 ft)) in Naltar Valley, in Gilgit-Baltistan, Pakistan. The melting waters of the glacier give rise to Naltar River.

== See also ==
- Shani Peak
- Naltar Valley
- List of glaciers
