= Jutal =

- Village
- Location in Pakistan
- Coordinates: 36°2′14″N 74°17′54″E
- Country: Pakistan
- Province: Gilgit-Baltistan
- District: Gilgit
- Time zone: UTC+5:30 (PST)
  - Summer (DST): +5

Jutal (Urdu, Shina: جوتل) is a village in the Gilgit District, in Gilgit Baltistan, Pakistan. The village is 30 kilometres (19 mi) from Gilgit city. The world's highest paved road, KKH, passes through the village. In the south of the village is a small settlement, formed by migrant families affected during sectarian tension of 1988, called Jagot colony.

== See also ==
- Gilgit City
- Nomal Valley
