= Naltar Peak =

Mountain in Pakistan

Naltar Peak نلتر چوٹی
- Location within Pakistan

Highest point
- Elevation: 4,678 m (15,348 ft)
- Listing: List of mountains in Pakistan
- Coordinates: 36°06′23″N 74°11′45″E

Geography
- Location: Naltar Valley, Pakistan
- Parent range: Karakoram

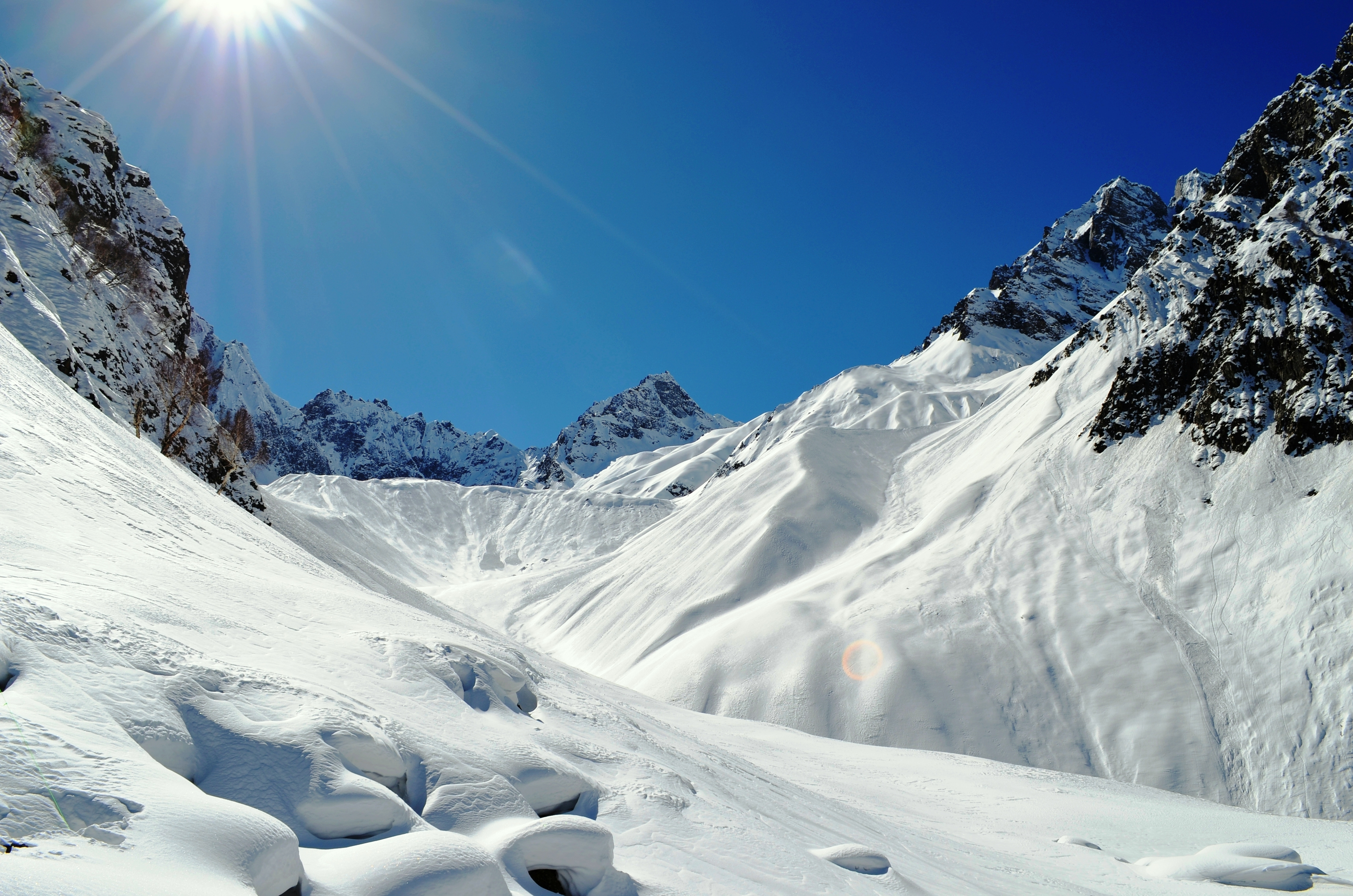
Naltar ski resort is an hour's drive from Gilgit. It serves as the main facility for the Ski Federation of Pakistan and hosted the 2016 Karakoram Alpine Ski Cup.

Naltar Peak (Urdu: نلتر چوٹی) is a mountain of the Karakoram range in Naltar Valley in Gilgit District of Gilgit-Baltistan, Pakistan. It lies to the southeast of Mehrbani Peak (5,639 m).

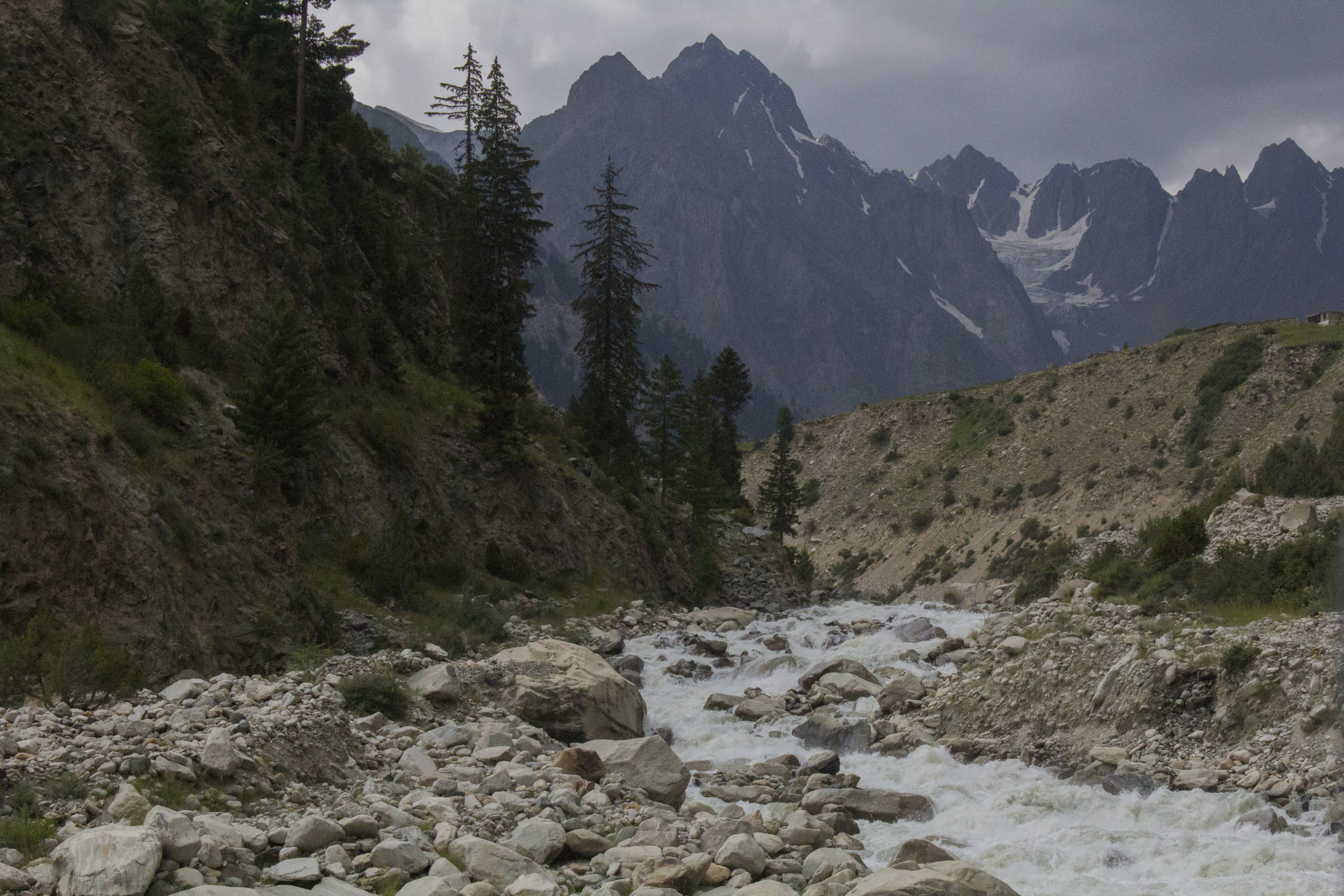
Naltar is a valley near Gilgit, Hunza and Nomal, in the Gilgit-Baltistan region of Pakistan. Naltar is 40 km (25 mi) from Gilgit and can be reached by jeeps.

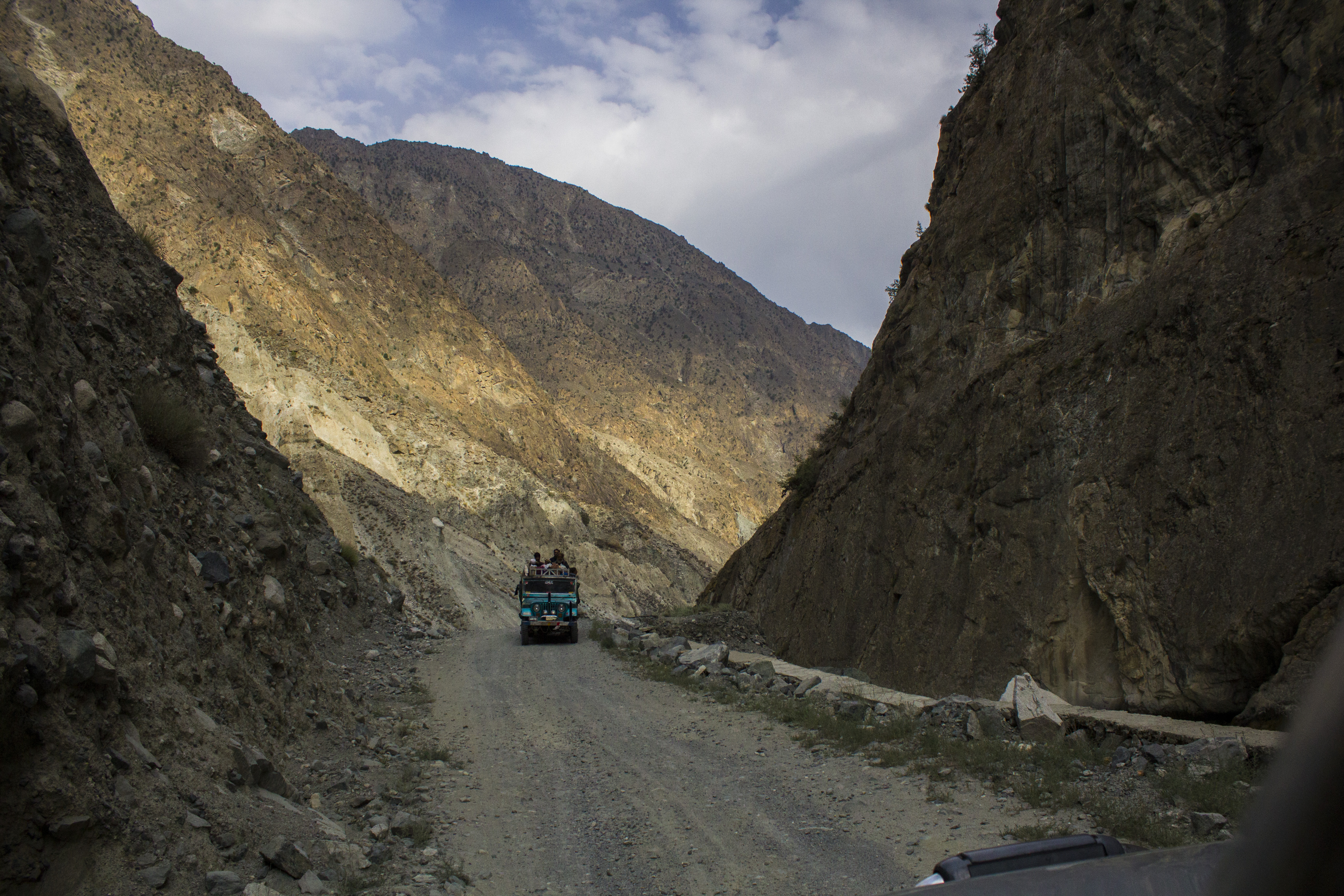
Vehicles such as the one shown are very common on the tough and rocky roads of this area. Tourists in particular like to plan their trips on similar 4x4 vehicles.

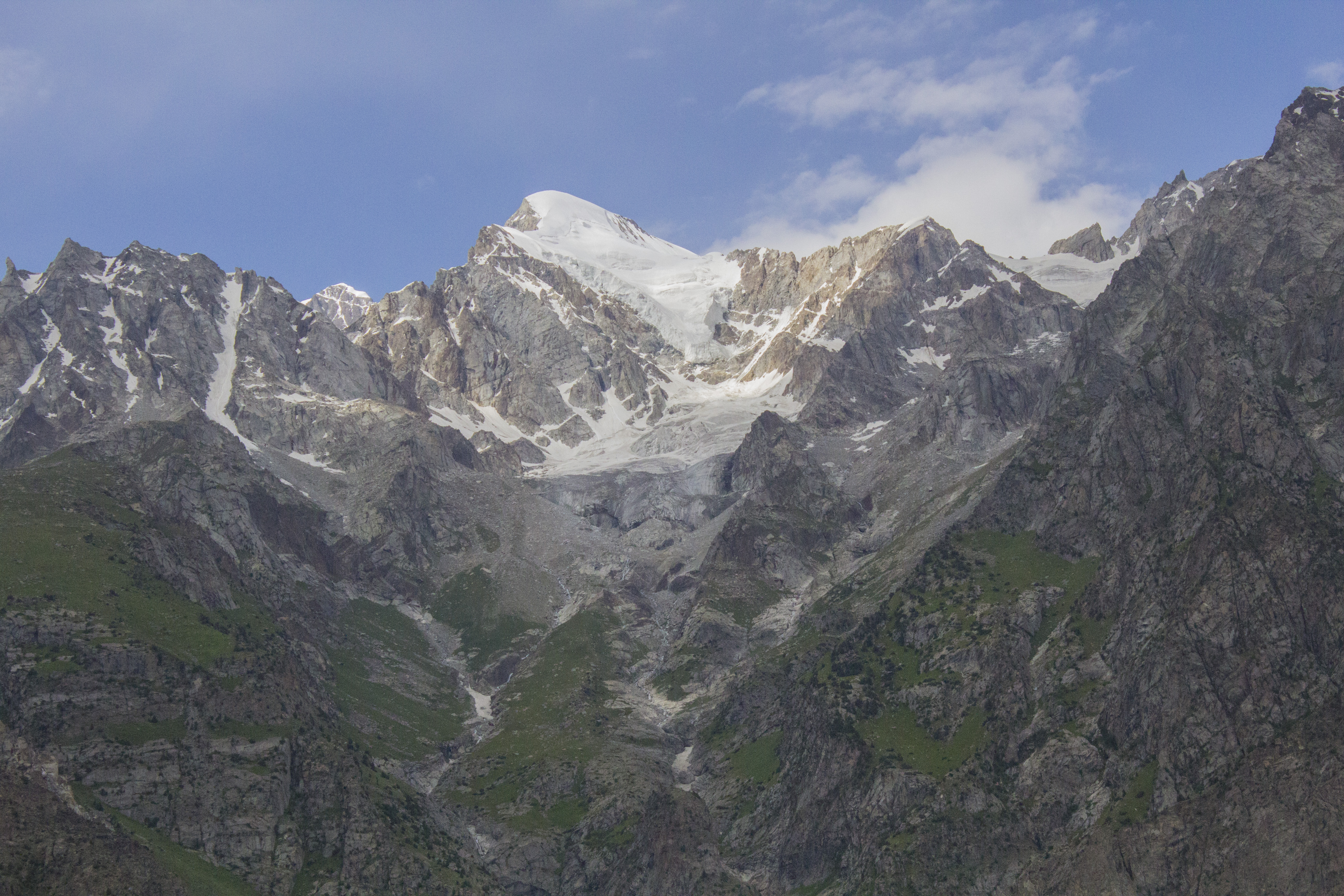
Mountains of Naltar, on the foothills of which, skiing is a popular sport.

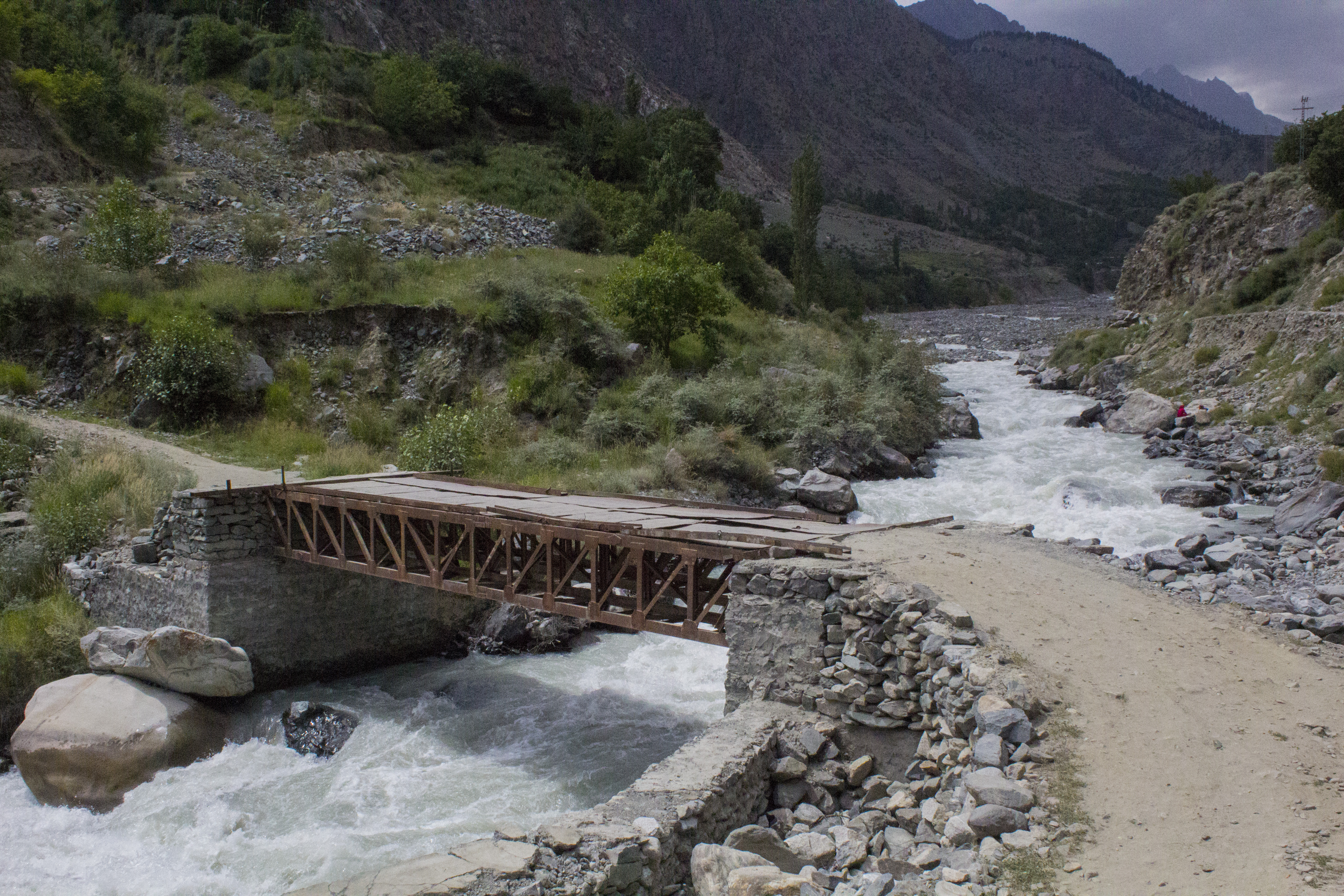
A tight bridge in Naltar valley that one has to pass in order to get to the skiing resort ahead.
