= Naltar (ski resort) =

Ski resort in Pakistan

Naltar ski resort
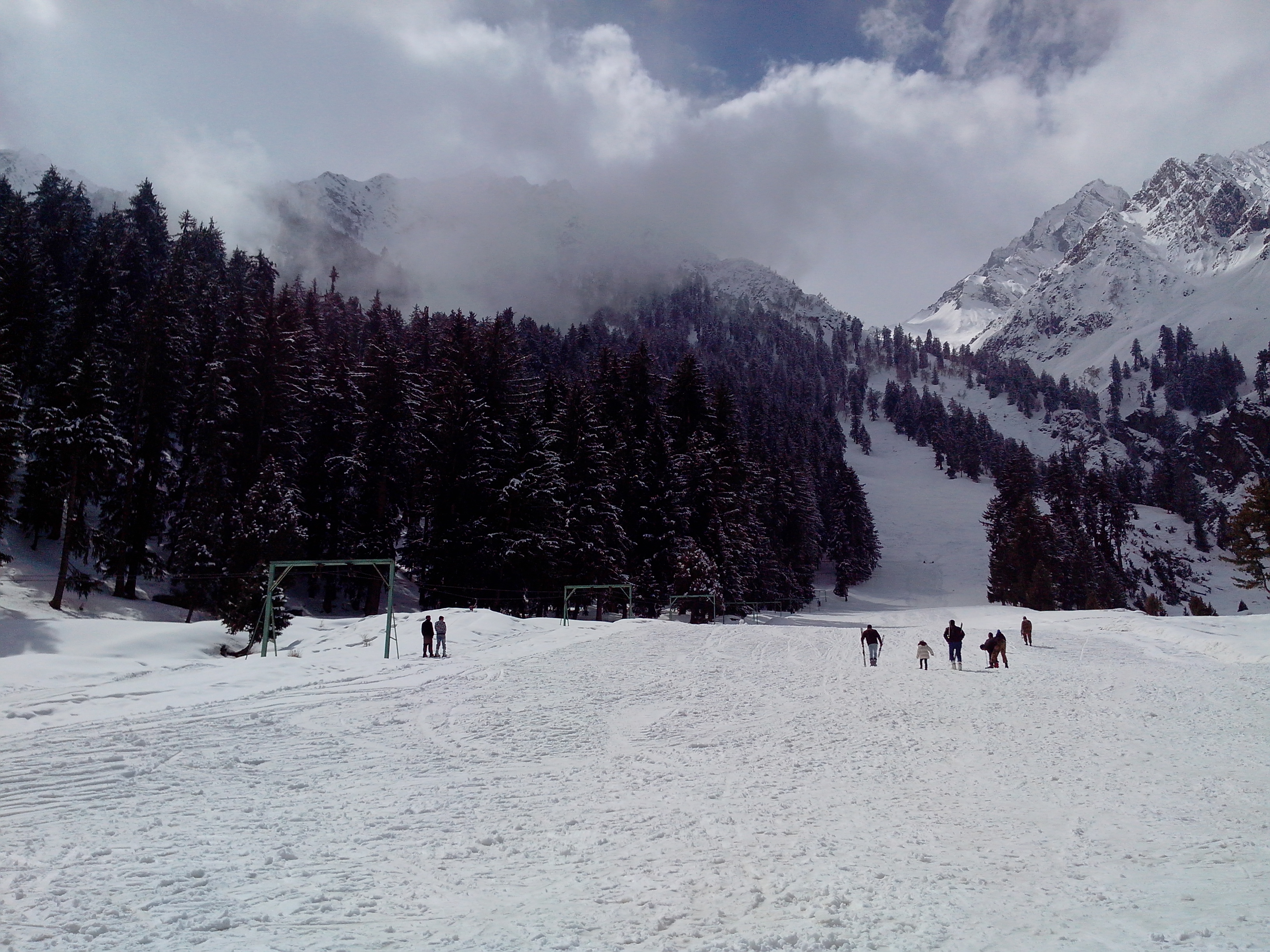
- A ski slope in Naltar ski resort

- Location within Gilgit Baltistan Location within Pakistan
- Location: Naltar, Pakistan
- Nearest city: Gilgit
- Coordinates: 36°09′55″N 74°10′42″E
- Top elevation: 2,950 metres (9,680 ft)
- Base elevation: 2,870 metres (9,420 ft)
- Skiable area: Length of pistes: Area:
- Lift capacity: 1

Naltar ski resort (Urdu: نلتر سکی سیرگاہ) is a ski resort situated in the Naltar Valley in the Karakoram range in Gilgit-Baltistan, Pakistan at a top elevation of 2,950 metres (9,680 ft). The resort is located 40 kilometers northwest of Gilgit. It also serves as the main facility for the Ski Federation of Pakistan and the Pakistan National Ski Championship. It also hosted the 2016 Karakoram Alpine Ski Cup.

== Facilities ==
Naltar is the oldest ski resort in Pakistan, however is relatively less known and less developed than Malam Jabba ski resort in Khyber Pakhtunkhwa. The major obstacle to Naltar’s development has been the dilapidated condition of the road leading from Gilgit to Naltar. As things stand, the one-hour journey to Naltar is possible only by four-wheel drive jeeps. In 2015, a chairlift was constructed and work on rebuilding the Gilgit-Naltar Road has been proposed.

== See also ==
- Malam Jabba ski resort
- Ski Federation of Pakistan
