= Naltar Pass =

Pakistani mountain pass

- Location within Pakistan
- Elevation: 4,600 m (15,100 ft)

Location
- Location: Gilgit Baltistan, Pakistan
- Range: Karakoram range
- Coordinates: 36°20′06″N 74°2′39″E

Naltar Pass is a mountain pass to the north of Shani Peak in Naltar Valley in Pakistan. The pass lies west of Chaprot Pass and east of Hayal Pass.

== See also ==
- Naltar Valley
