= Shani Peak =

Mountain in Pakistan

Shani Peak شانی چوٹی

Highest point
- Elevation: 5,887 m (19,314 ft)
- Coordinates: 36°17′58.57″N 74°1′31.78″E

Geography
- Location: Naltar Pass, Pakistan
- Parent range: Karakoram

Climbing
- First ascent: 14 August 1986 (Roger Everett and Guy Muhlemann)

Shani Peak (Urdu: شانی چوٹی), also known as Khaltar Peak, is a mountain to the south of Naltar Pass in the Gilgit District of Gilgit-Baltistan, Pakistan. It lies to the west of Snow Dome (5,029 m) and in the northwest of Mehrbani Peak (5,639 m). To its east flow the melting waters of the Shani Glacier towards Naltar Valley.

== See also ==
- List of mountains in Pakistan
- Naltar Valley
