= Astor markhor =

Scientific classification
- Kingdom: Animalia
- Phylum: Chordata
- Class: Mammalia
- Order: Artiodactyla
- Family: Bovidae
- Subfamily: Caprinae
- Genus: Capra
- Species: C. falconeri
- Subspecies: C. f. falconeri

Trinomial name
- Capra falconeri falconeri (Wagner, 1839)

Synonyms
- Aegoceros falconeri falconeri Wagner, 1839

Markhor subspecies native to Kashmir and northern Pakistan

The Astor markhor (Capra falconeri falconeri) or flare-horned markhor is a markhor subspecies native to Afghanistan, Pakistan and India.

== Ecology ==
The Astor markhor lives in the scrubland and open woodland that clothe the rugged slopes of the mountains among which it lives at altitudes of up to 3,600 m (11,800 ft). It seldom goes above the tree line; in summer it feeds largely on grasses and leaves but in winter it mainly browses on shrubs and woody material. One or two kids are born after a gestation period of 135 to 170 days. The goats are hunted by snow leopards, wolves and lynx, and the kids may fall prey to golden eagles.

== Status ==
A 2024–25 survey by the Government of Gilgit-Baltistan in the five districts of Astore, Diamer, Gilgit, Skardu and Nagar counted 1,693 Astor markhors. The highest concentration was in Astore at 693 individuals, followed by Gilgit and Diamer with 433 each. In 2021, the count of Kashmir markhors at Chitral Gol National Park stood at 2,278. Surveys in 2019–21 survey estimated 7,579 individuals of Capra falconeri in northern Pakistan.

The 2011 estimate for the total population is around 5,800 individuals, divided into several sub-populations, with only one exceeding 1,000 individuals. The main threat they face is being hunted. Even where the animal is protected by legislation as in Afghanistan, poaching takes place and the ban on hunting is not enforced.

In India it is fully protected and is present in three wildlife reserves, the Limber Wildlife Sanctuary, and the Lachipora Wildlife Sanctuary and the Hirapora Wildlife Sanctuary. These three areas are planned to be combined to create the Kazinag National Park in order to protect the Astor markhor and other mammals such as the snow leopard and the Himalayan brown bear. In Pakistan, the Astor markhor is present in Naltar Wildlife Sanctuary in the northern part of the country.
