= Jagot colony =

Jagot جگوٹ
- Town

Jagot or Jagot colony is a small settlement in Gilgit district in Gilgit Baltistan, Pakistan. The settlement is near the Karakoram Highway (previously the Silk Road). It is located a mile from the Jutal village. The settlement was formed by the migrant families, who were persecuted in their native village by majority sect in 1988 sectarian violence in Gilgit.

== Places nearby ==
- Jutal
- Nomal
- Gujar Das
