= Mehrbani Peak =

Mountain in Pakistan

Mehrbani Peak مہربانی چوٹی
- Location within Pakistan

Highest point
- Elevation: 5,639 m (18,501 ft)
- Listing: List of mountains in Pakistan
- Coordinates: 36°11′52″N 74°05′05″E

Geography
- Location: Naltar Valley, Pakistan
- Parent range: Karakoram

Mehrbani Peak (مہربانی چوٹی), also known as Khaitar Peak, is a mountain in Naltar Valley in the Gilgit District of Gilgit–Baltistan, Pakistan. It lies to the northwest of Naltar Peak (4,678 m) and to the south of Snow Dome (5,029 m). The peak is part of the Karakoram mountain range.

== Nearby Peaks ==
Mehrbani Peak is surrounded by several other significant peaks in the Karakoram range:

- Shani Peak (5,887 m) - 12.6 km northwest
- Snow Dome, Chaprot (5,029 m) - 12.8 km north
- Naltar Peak (4,678 m) - 14.3 km southeast
- Batura II (7,762 m) - 23.2 km north
- Rakaposhi (7,788 m) - 37.4 km east
- Sangemarmar Sar (6,949 m) - 49.6 km northeast
- Batura (7,795 m) - 51.3 km north
- Diran Peak (7,266 m) - 53.0 km east
- Laila Peak, Haramosh (4,800 m) - 54.1 km southeast
- Hunza Peak (6,270 m) - 54.2 km northeast
