= Naltar Lakes =

Group of lakes in Gilgit-Baltistan, Pakistan

Naltar Lakes
نلتر جھیلیں

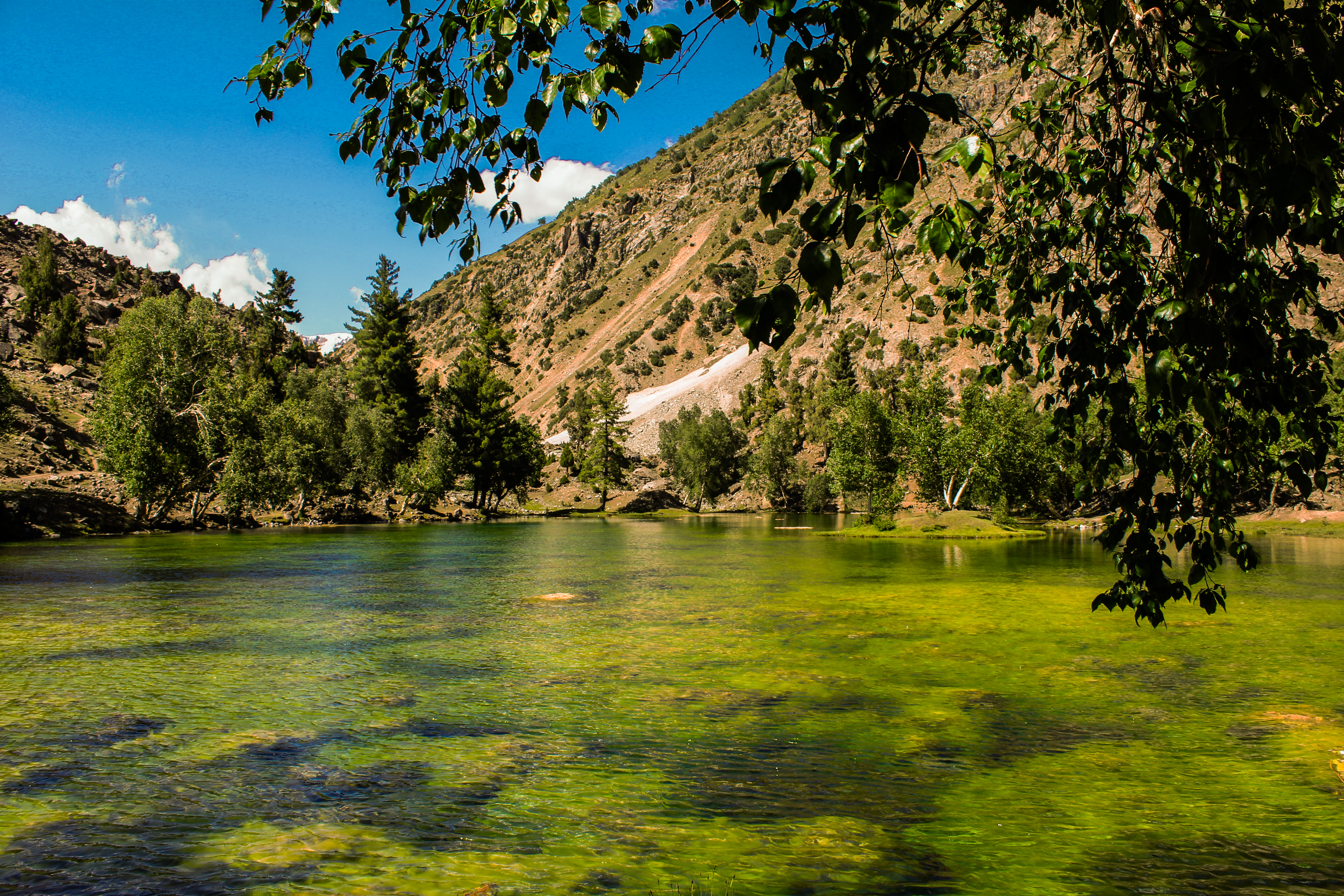
Naltar Lake or Bashkiri Lake I or Satrangi Lake

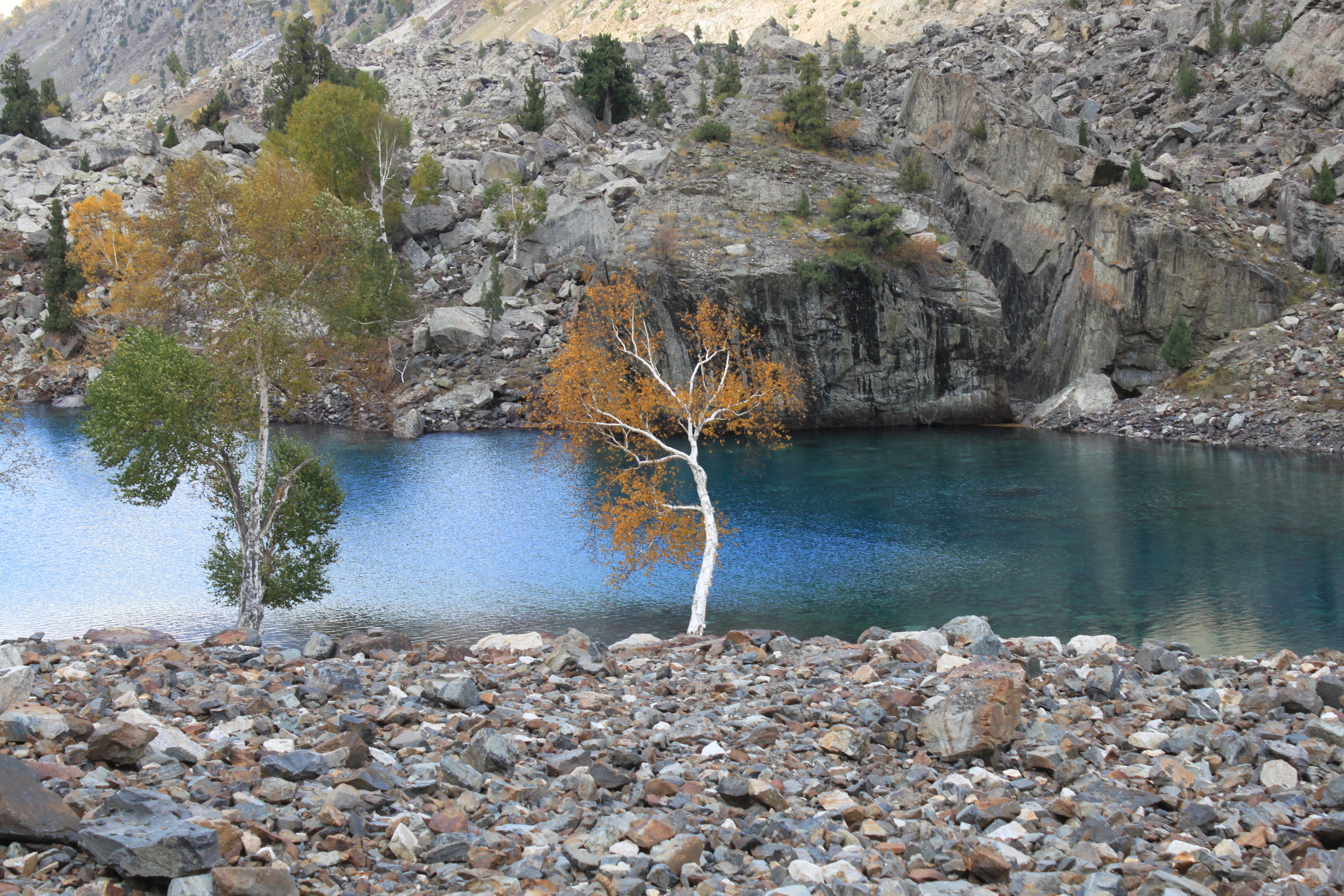
Bashkiri Lake II or Blue Lake

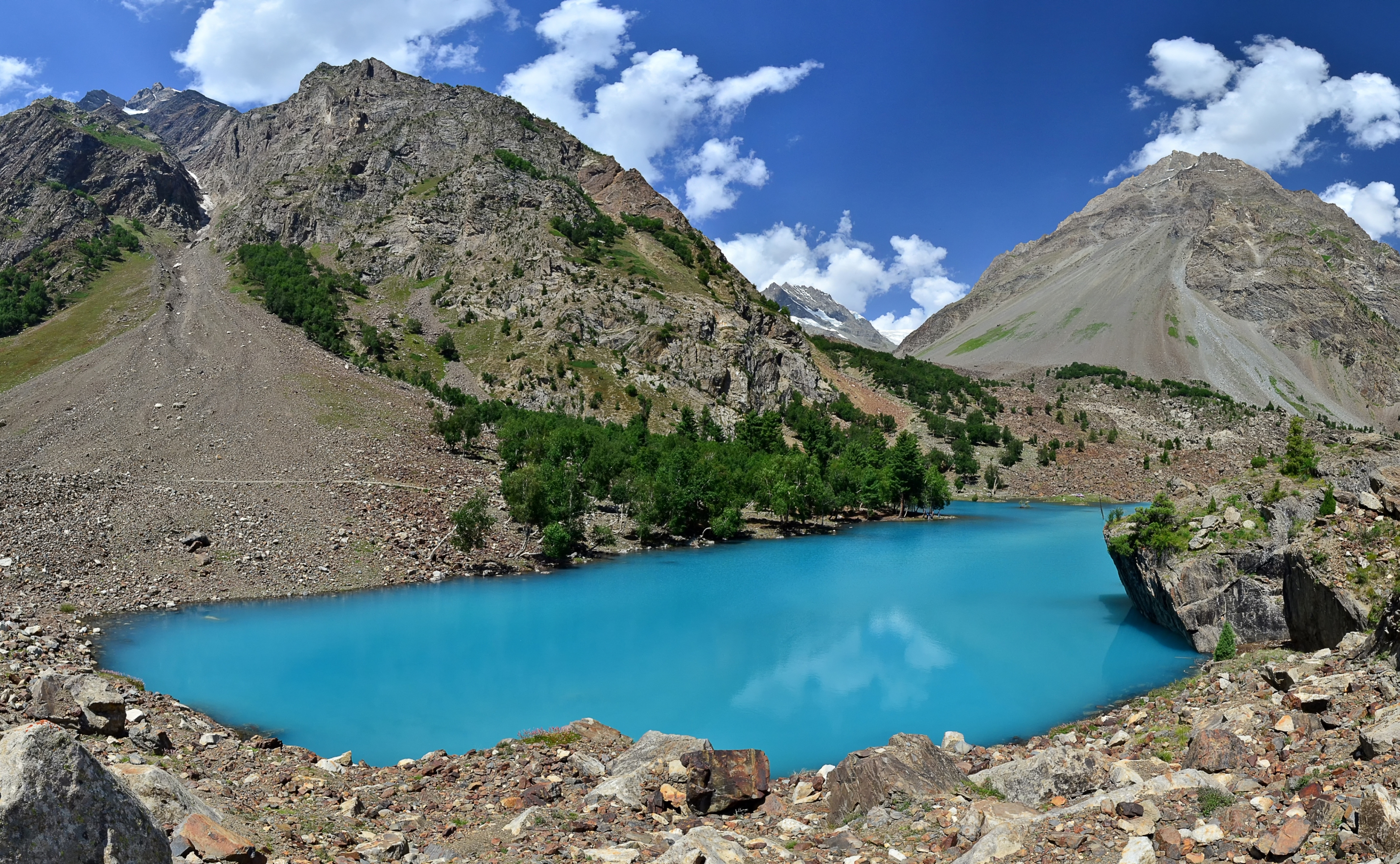
Bashkiri Lake III or Feroza Lake

Surface elevation = 3050-3150 m

There are four major alpine lakes in Naltar Valley of Gilgit-Baltistan, Pakistan. Known as Naltar Lakes (Urdu: نلتر) or Bashkiri Lakes, they are located at altitudes ranging from 3,050–3,150 metres (10,010–10,330 ft). The best time to visit the lakes is from May to October. During the winter, it becomes almost impossible to reach the lake by vehicle due to the heavy snowfall in Naltar Valley.

== The Lakes ==
=== Bashkiri Lake I or Satrangi Lake ===
The first and largest of all lakes is Bashkiri Lake I or Satrangi Lake. The name "سترنگی" ('Satrangi') means 'seven-colored' in Urdu, so called because of the many shades of blue and green visible on the surface of the lake due to the moss, grasses, aquatic plants and roots of the trees in and around the lake. It is located about 12 kilometres (7.5 mi) from Upper Naltar (or the Naltar Bala). The road up to the lakes is a dirt road alongside a stream flowing down the valley. The lakes are surrounded by dense pine forests.

=== Bashkiri Lake II or Blue Lake ===
The second lake has blue colored water and is so called Blue Lake.

=== Bashkiri Lake III or Feroza Lake ===
The third has azure colored water and is thus called Feroza Lake. "فیروزہ" ('Feroza') in Urdu means azure color.

== See also ==
- List of lakes in Pakistan
- Nomal Valley
- Danyor
- Gilgit City
- Bagrot Valley
