= Limber Wildlife Sanctuary =

Indian wildlife sanctuary

Coordinates: 34°11′14″N 74°09′36″E

- Kazinag Wildlife Sanctuary
- IUCN category IV (habitat/species management area)
- Interactive map of Limber Wildlife Sanctuary
- Location: Limber, Baramulla district, Jammu and Kashmir, India
- Nearest city: Baramulla City, Srinagar
- Area: 26 km^{2} (10 sq mi)

Limber Wildlife Sanctuary or Kazing Wildlife Sanctuary (also written as Qazing) is situated in Limber in Baramulla district in Indian union territory of Jammu & Kashmir. It is located, near Baramulla city and Srinagar. It is the fourth national park in the state which focuses the attention towards conserving the rare markhor wild goat. It is also a part of an eco-sensitive zone as notified by the Government of Jammu & Kashmir.

== Location ==
Limber Wildlife Sanctuary covers an area of 26.00 sq. km or 4,375 ha. It is located on North bank of Jhelum in Baramulla district of Jammu & Kashmir. It is close to the Line of Control, which is the international jurisdiction border that India holds with Pakistan. It is situated at a distance of about 70 km from Srinagar.

== Wildlife ==
The sanctuary is a conservation ground for Markhor wild goats. Apart from other species of goats, Limber Wildlife Sanctuary also is home to Himalayan musk deer, leopards and brown bears. 120 different species of birds and 20 species of mammals are found here as well.

== Geo-environmental damage ==
Geo-environmental damage was caused in the remote area of Limber Wildlife Sanctuary during the earthquake on 8 October 2005. Jammu & Kashmir Government provided aid of Rs 30,000 to affected families and Rs 1 lakh for reconstruction purposes.
