= Gilgit Tehsil =

Gilgit Tehsil is a tehsil in Gilgit District, Pakistan. It contains the city of Gilgit and some villages.

Assistant Commissioner Gilgit Adil Ali (PAS)

The table below shows some of the villages in Gilgit tehesil.

Village	Description	Coord	Ref
Bagrot			
Basseen			
Bilchar		35.954°N 74.517°E	
Chakarkot		35.730°N 74.574°E	
Damoot			
Daroot			
Danyor	Probably the largest and widest village of the tehsil, it has gained the status of town in 2008. It is located 8 kilometres (5.0 mi) to the east of Gilgit. It is a greener and agricultural area. Many schools and colleges have been set up recently and its population is above 40,000 individuals. The literacy rates, according to 2007-08 survey conducted by Local Support Organization, is over 78%.	35.920°N 74.388°E	
Hainzal			
Haramosh		35.840°N 74.702°E	
Jaglot	Also known as Juglot Sai.	36.179°N 74.310°E	
Jalal Abad	A large village about 15 kilometres (9.3 mi) east of Giligt, with a population of about 20,000.	35.880°N 74.493°E	
Jalal Abad (Masingote)			
Kar Gah	Also known as Kargah.	35.909°N 74.256°E	
Manoot			
Minawar	A village of around 300 families located 8 kilometres (5.0 mi) southeast of Gilgit.	35.876°N 74.436°E	
Nagral	It is situated near City Park Gilgit City.	35.915°N 74.313°E	
Nomal		36.074°N 74.283°E	
Oshikhandass	Also known as Oshi-khand-das.	35.885°N 74.467°E	
Pahoot		35.772°N 74.276°E	
Parri Bangla	A small village on the Karakoram Highway about 20 kilometres (12 mi) from Gilgit. The ancient name of the village was Pari or Fairi. Parri Bangla has a population of about 1,200. Only about 2% of the people are literate and most of the peoples are labourers.	35.815°N 74.559°E	
Sakwar		35.885°N 74.388°E	
Sakaar koi			
Shahtoot			
Sharoot			
Sonikoat			
