= Michael Shani =

Michael Shani (Hebrew: מיכאל שני) is a well-known figure in the Israeli musical scene. He was born and raised in Israel, where he began his musical career as a cellist. He played in the Kibbutz Chamber Orchestra and was the conductor of the Kibbutz Symphony Orchestra. He completed his musical training at the Tel-Aviv Music Teacher's College, the Rubin Academy of Music in Jerusalem and at the Brigham Young University in Utah, United States.

== History ==
Michael Shani was the music director of the Tel Aviv Philharmonic Choir, the new Israeli Opera Choir and the Vocal Music festivals of Tel Aviv and Abu Ghosh. He has conducted the Israel Philharmonic Orchestra, the Israel Chamber Orchestra, the Kibbutz Chamber Orchestra, the Haifa Symphony orchestra, the Ra'anana Symphony, the Be'er-Sheva Symphonette and orchestras in Germany, Hungary, Czech and Italy.

He was among the founders of the Israeli School of Choral singing, established in 1986 in Tel Aviv and he continues to act as its academic director and principal conductor while also teaching at the Rubin Academy of Music in Tel Aviv and in the Department of Music in the University of Haifa.

Michael Shani is the music director of the Zimriya World Assembly of Choirs in Israel. He founded the Tel-Aviv Chamber Choir in 1987 and since that time continues to serve as its music director. He is the Head of Choral Conducting Department at the Buchmann-Mehta School of Music in Tel-Aviv University. He teaches choral conducting and conducts the Oratorio and the chamber choir of the school.
