= Bashkaro Pass =

Mountain Pass in Pakistan

- Kukush Pass
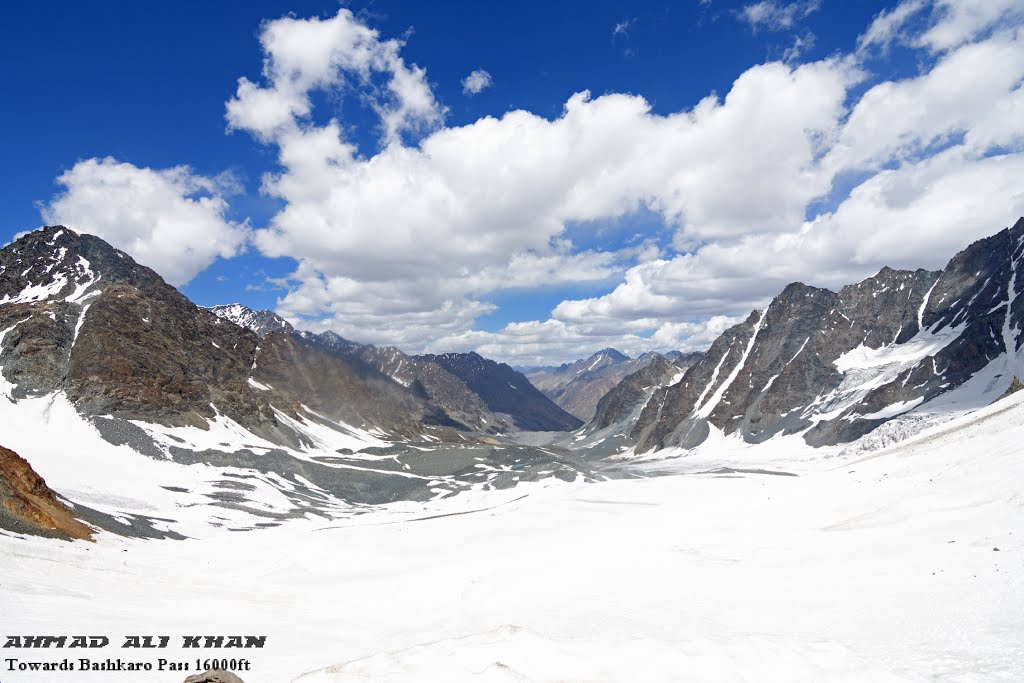
- Bashkaro Pass

- Location within Pakistan
- Elevation: 4,924 m (16,155 ft)

Third Approach
- Location: Khyber Pakhtunkhwa, Pakistan
- Coordinates: 35°52′55″N 72°32′27″E

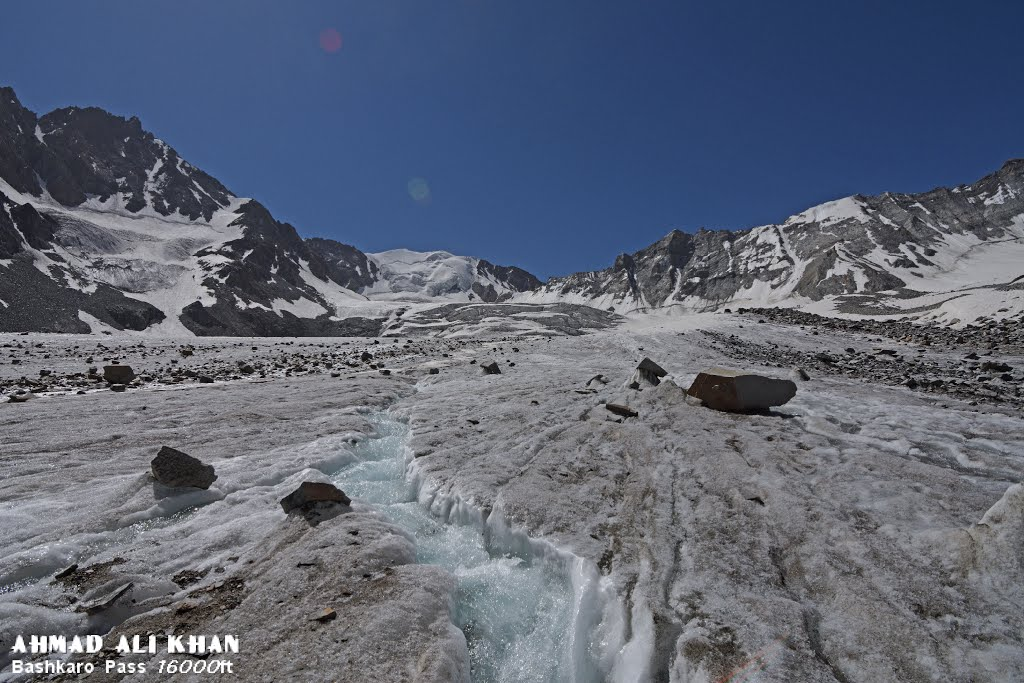
Bashkaro Pass 16000ft - panoramio - Ahmad Ali Khan (2)

Bashkaro Pass, also known as Bashkaro Top, is a mountain pass located in Pakistan. It is classified as a T - Hypsographic pass and is situated in the Asia/Pacific region. The pass has an elevation of 4,924 meters above sea level and is geographically positioned at approximately 35°52'55" N latitude and 72°32'27" E longitude in Degrees Minutes Seconds (DMS) format, or 35.8819° N and 72.5408° E in decimal degrees. Its UTM (Universal Transverse Mercator) position is BV77, and its Joint Operation Graphics reference is NI43-01.

The Bashkaro Pass, also referred to as Kukush Pass and Bashkarn An, connects the Swat Valley with the Ghizer Valley in Gilgit-Baltistan (GB), Pakistan. A mountain pass is a gap or opening in a mountain range or other high terrain that provides a passage for transportation from one side to the other.

The journey through this pass begins at Mahodand Lake and concludes at Langar in the Ghizer Valley.

The Bashkaro Pass, being a challenging and infrequently traversed route, connects the upper Ghizer Valley with the Ushu Gol in Kalam Kohistan to the south. This trek spans approximately 60 kilometers through the Hindukush range, and features mighty lakes rivers and glaciers.

== See also ==
- Khunjerab Pass
- Burzil Pass
- Khyber Pass
