= Nomal, Gilgit-Baltistan =

Valley in Gilgit-Baltistan, Pakistan

Nomal نومل
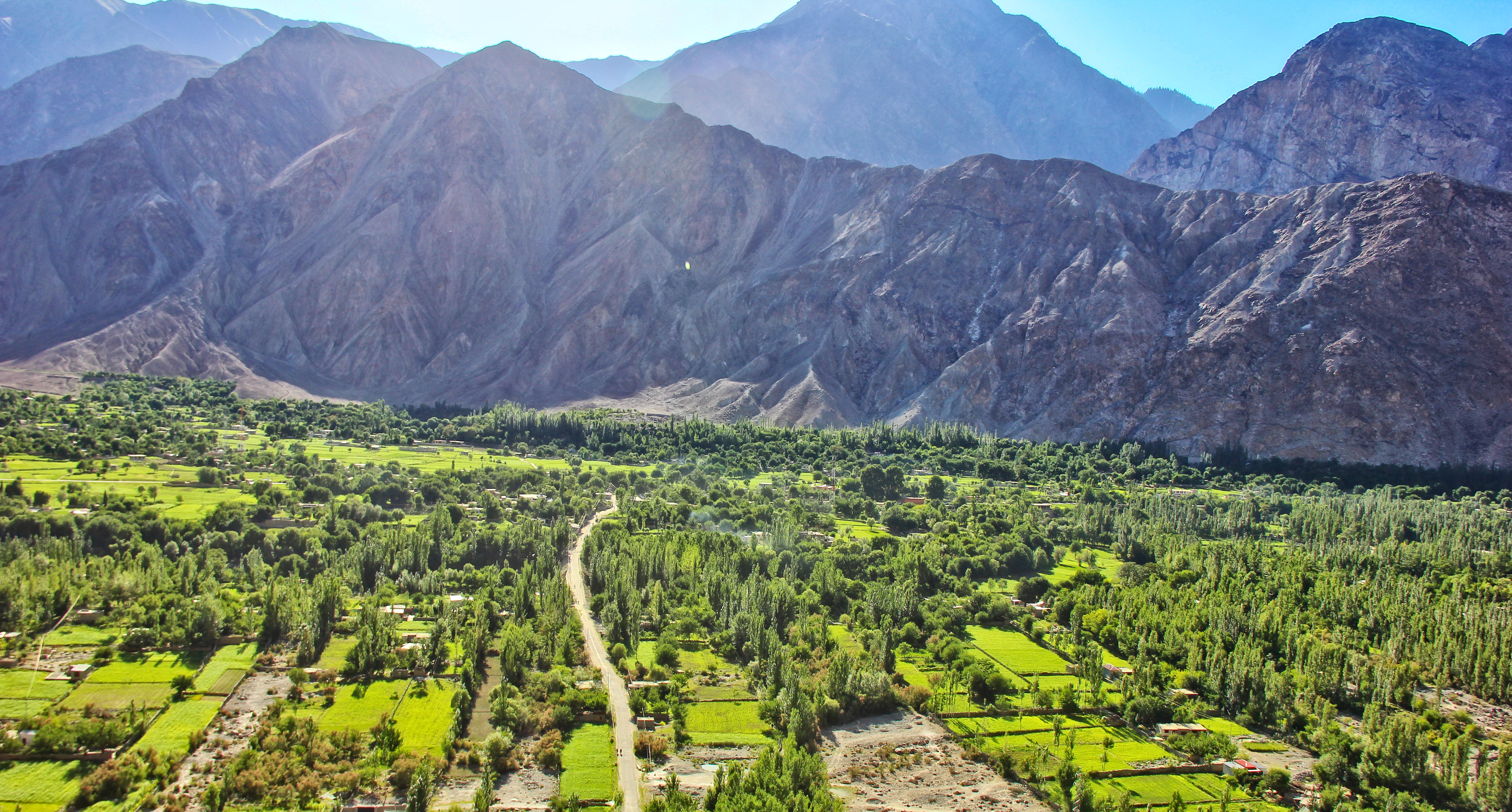
- A view of the valley from the Karakoram Highway
- Interactive map of Nomal نومل
- Coordinates: 36°4′33.3″N 74°17′0.5″E

Dimensions
  - Length: 12 km (7.5 mi)
  - Width: 3 km (1.9 mi)
- Elevation: 1,582 m (5,190 ft)

Nomal (Shina, Urdu: ناؤ-مل، نومل) is a small town located on the Hunza River, 25 kilometres (16 mi) north of Gilgit city in Gilgit District, in northern Pakistan. Nomal is also connected with Nalter Bala and Nalter Pain through a metaled road.

Shina and Brushaski are spoken by the people and all inhabitants of the town are adherents of Islam.

== Geography ==
Since the times of Rajas (in Shina means Rahs) Nomal is divided into mohallahs or sectors. The mohallahs are: Sigal, Majini, Jigot, Batot, Kamalabad, Ishphis, Momin Abad, Sadaruddinabad, Das and Khaltarot. The Nalter River flows through the northern end of the valley, which also supplies water to the entire valley. The river eventually merges with the Hunza River.

Sir Aurel Stein, a British archaeologist and explorer says about Nomal in his travelogue:

"The first march of eighteen miles was to Nomal, a green oasis in the other barren valley of the river which comes from Hunza."

A concrete bridge connects the valley to the Karakoram Highway, also to the villages, which are Jutal, Matum Das, Jagot colony, and Gujardas across the Hunza River.

== See also ==
- Danyor
