= Chaprote =

Villages in the Gilgit-Baltistan region in Pakistan

Chaprote is one of the earliest villages in Nagar District of the Gilgit-Baltistan region in Pakistan. It is a scenic area, in which the literacy rate is more than 90%. The village consists of 500 families and more than 10 tribes. Khimitay, Khanny, Masuty, Janay, Duguray and Bekhdury are well known families in the region.

Many miles of terraced fields and fruit orchards mark Chaprote, the earlier capital of Nagar Valley. It offers a panoramic view of the Rakaposhi and other peaks surrounding Nagar Valley. It is about 70 kilometres (43 mi) from Gilgit, the capital city of Gilgit-Baltistan region, and it takes a van about 1 hour to cover the distance. The total area of the valley is around 8 miles. There is a tourist spot called GAPA which gives a view of the Rakaposhi peak.

Chaprote is the center of a form of shamanism called "Danyalism".
