= Naltar Valley =

Valley in Gilgit-Baltistan, Pakistan

Naltar Valley وادی نلتر
- Valley
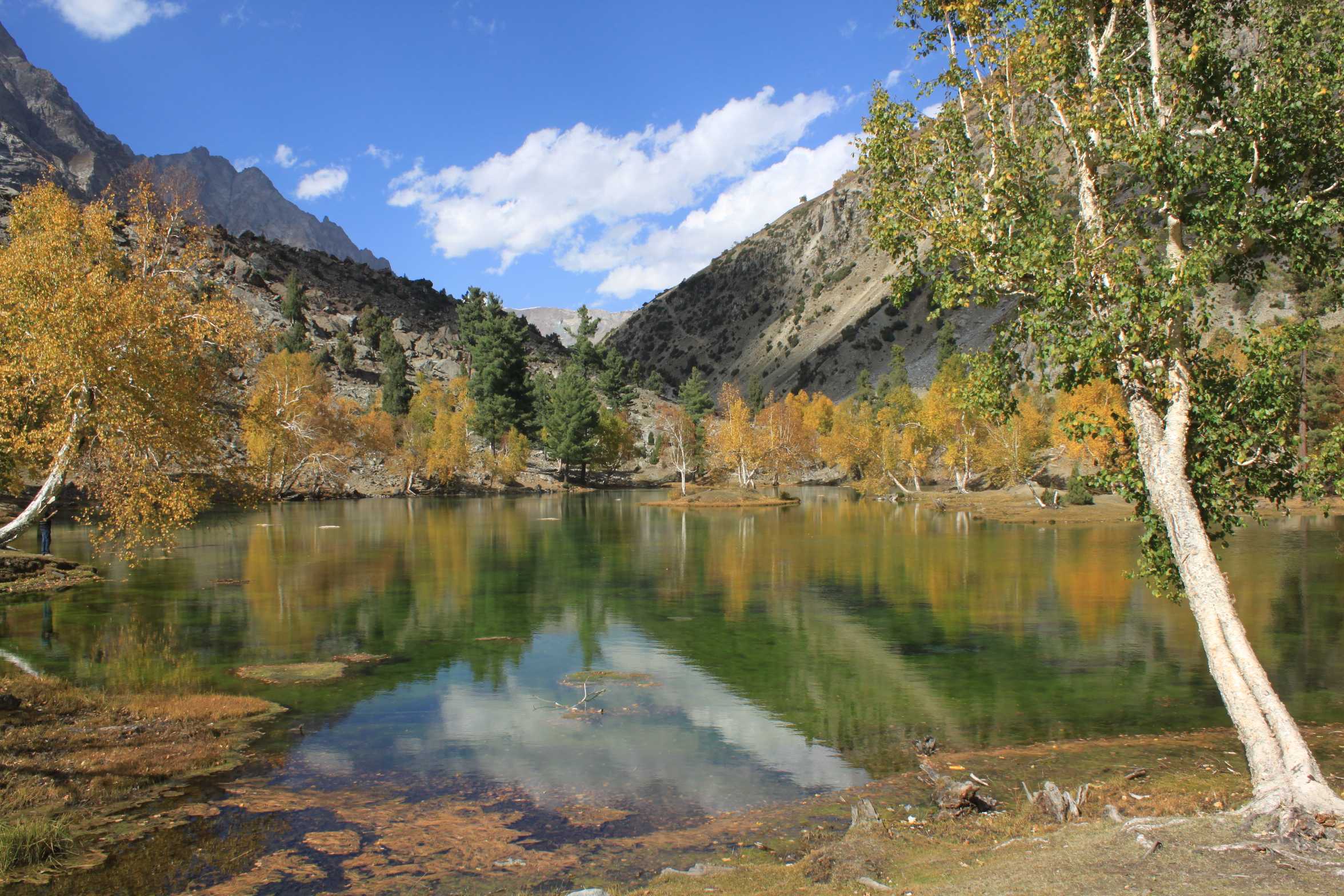
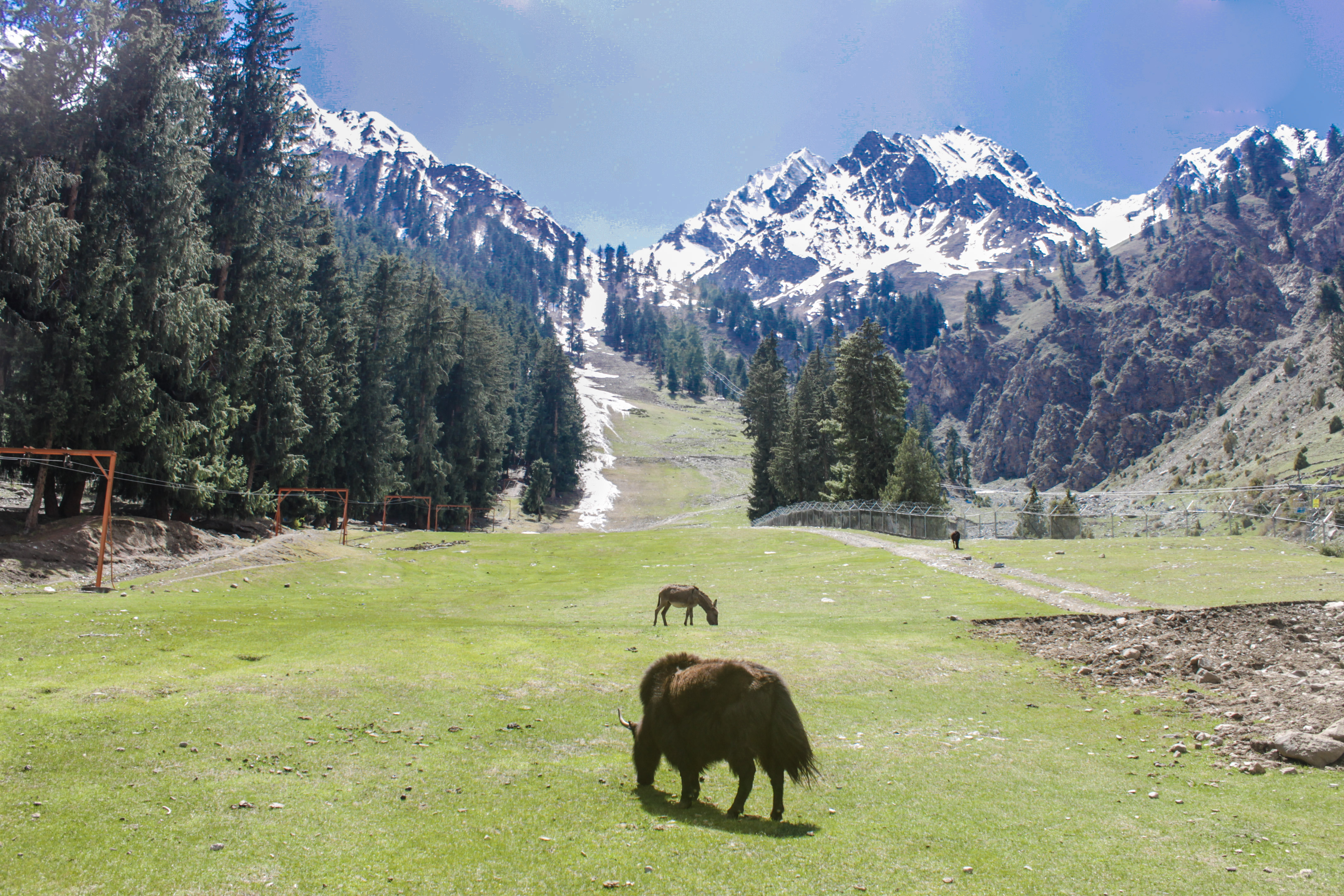
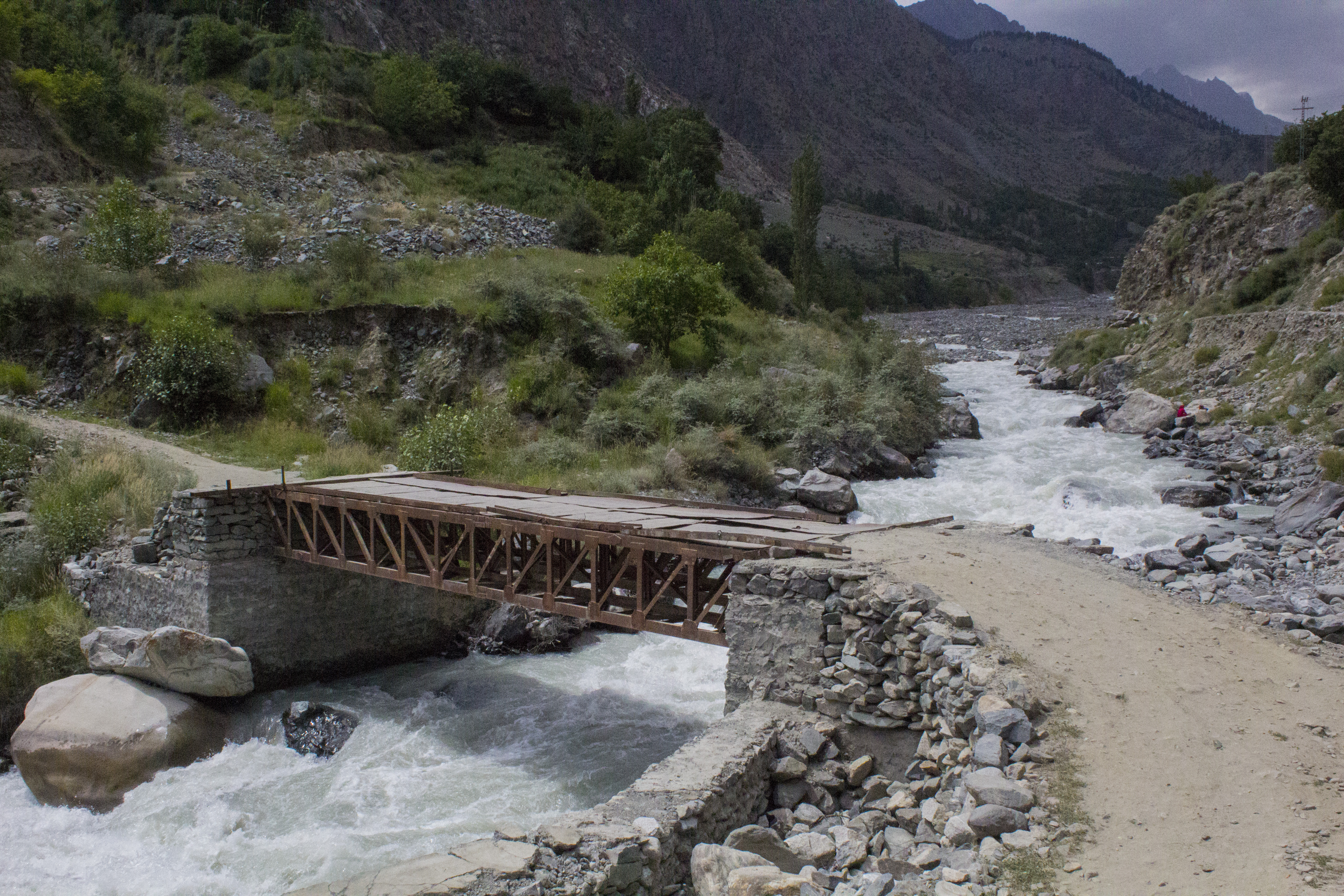
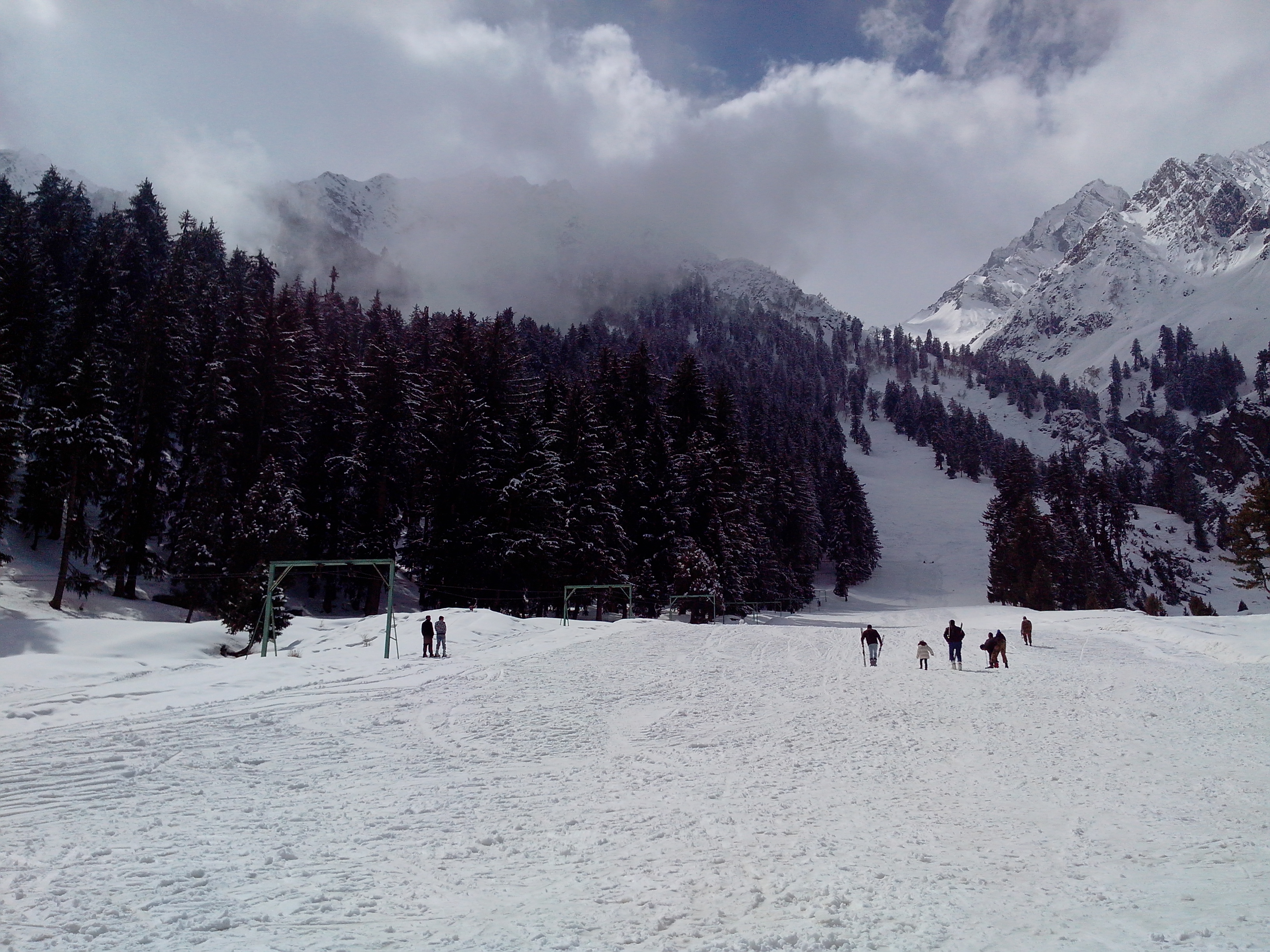
- Top left to right: A bridge in Naltar Valley, Grazing yalks in Naltar Valley, Naltar Lakes, Naltar ski resort
- Country: Pakistan
- Adm. Unit: Gilgit-Baltistan
- District: Gilgit District
- Tehsil: Gilgit Tehsil
- Time zone: UTC+05:00 (PKT)

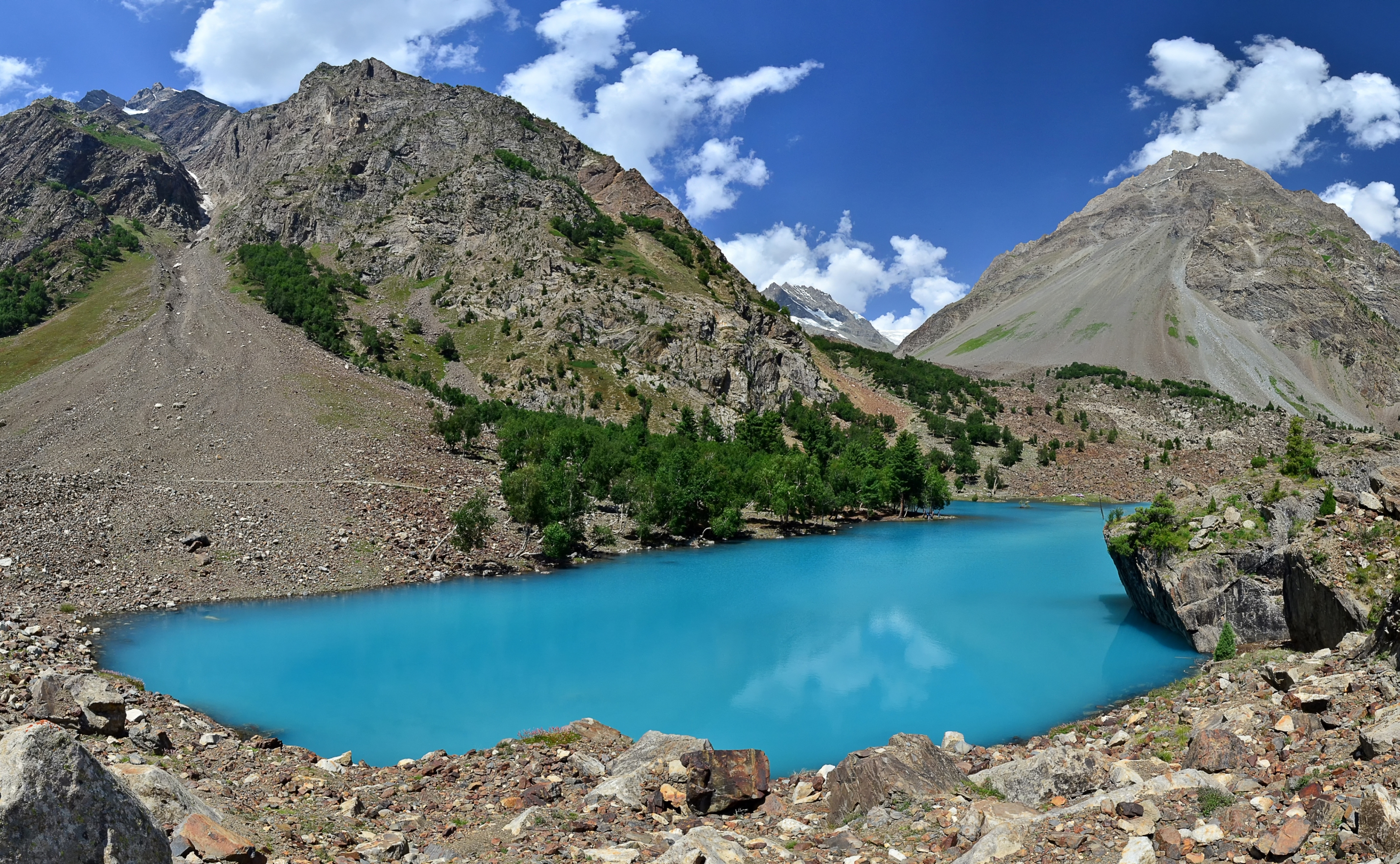
Bashkiri Lake is one of the popular Naltar lakes

The Naltar Valley is a valley situated about 34 kilometres (21 miles) from the city of Gilgit in Gilgit-Baltistan, Pakistan. It is a forested area distinguished by its three alpine lakes, Strangi Lake, Blue Lake, and Bodlok Lake, as well as by the mountainous landscape.

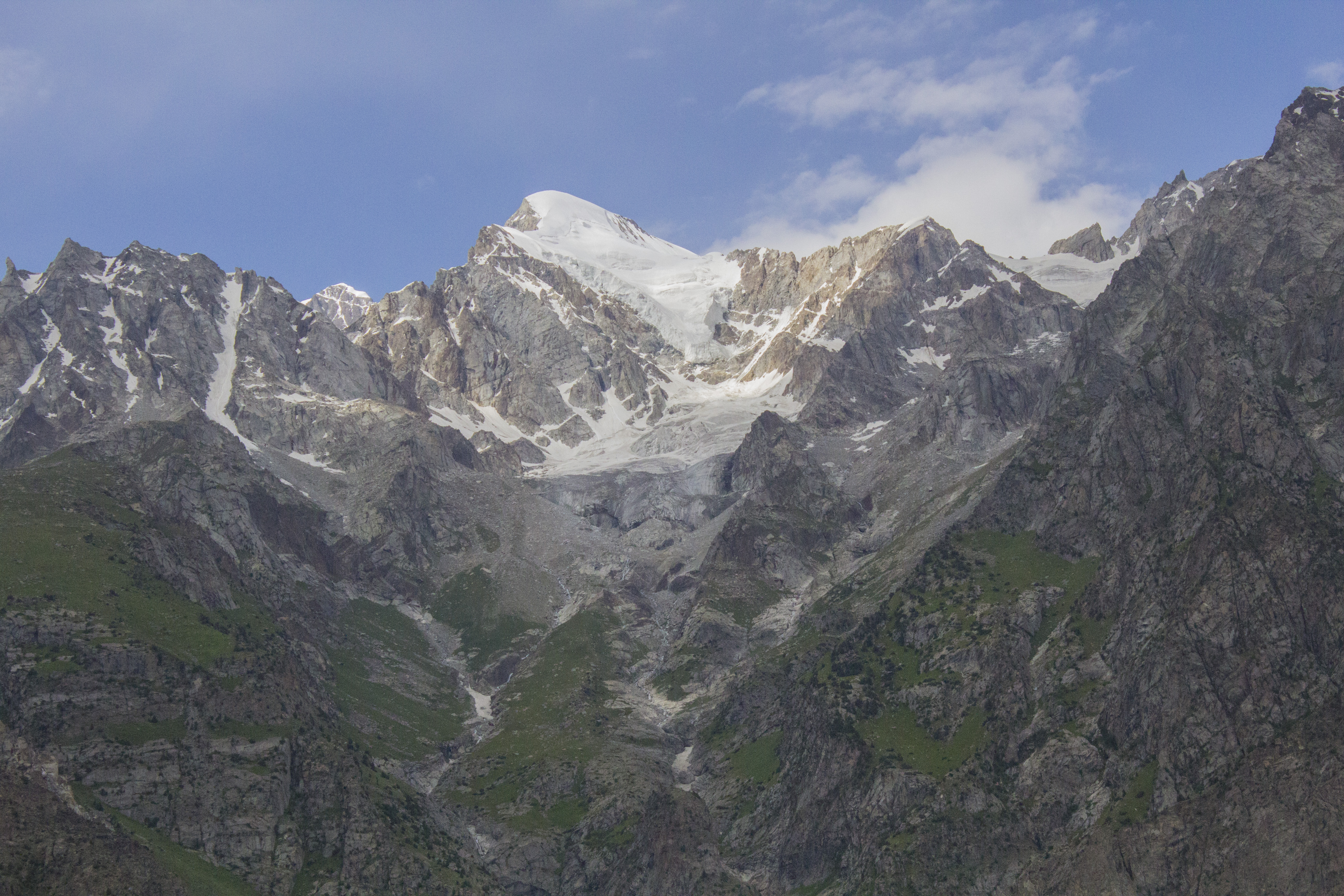
Skiing is a popular spot in the foothills of the Naltar Mountains

== Geography ==
The Naltar Valley is situated near the city of Gilgit, with the settlements of Naltar Bala (upper) and Naltar Paain (lower) in the valley about 34 kilometres (21 miles) and 40 kilometres (25 miles) from Gilgit, respectively. The Naltar Expressway connects Naltar with Gilgit via Nomal and Faizabad. A road from Nomal goes through the 'Silk Route' to China.

== Naltar Hydropower Projects (I, II, IV) ==
In addition to the existing three smaller hydropower generating facilities (Naltar I, II, and IV, totaling 3.02 MW), the government built an 18 MW hydropower plant, known as Naltar Hydropower Plant-IV, close to Naltar Pine to meet the region's energy needs. It has been in operation since October 2007. The 16 MW and 14 MW Naltar-III and Naltar-V hydropower projects, respectively, were under construction as of 2019.

== Naltar Wildlife Sanctuary ==
The Naltar Wildlife Sanctuary is a protected area in the valley that was established on 22 November 1975.

The sanctuary is covered with trees, with montane coniferous forests higher up and mixed montane, broadleaf, and coniferous forests at lower elevations. Picea and Juniperus are two examples of the conifer species that are present. Fraxinus, Olea, Pistacia, Sageretia, Betula, Salix, Populus, and Krascheninnikovia ceratoides are among the trees that are found. Artemisia, Haloxylon, and Stipa are a few herbs that grow in the area.

A few Astor markhor and an endangered species of wild goat live in the reserve. Other large mammals present include the Alpine ibex, snow leopard, brown bear, grey wolf, red fox, beech marten and leopard cat. Almost 35 species of birds have been recorded in the valley, including Brooks's leaf warbler.

== Naltar Lakes ==
The Naltar Lakes in the Naltar valley are Satrangi Lake, Halima Lake, Bodo Lake, Dhudia Lake, Pari Lake, and Blue Lake, at a distance of 13 kilometres (8.1 mi) from Naltar Bala. The road from the village to the lakes is nonmetallic and narrow alongside a stream throughout this road coming from the mountains. It is almost impossible to reach the lake through any vehicle in winter due to the snow (10 to 15 feet high) on the road.

== Tourism facilities ==
The valley offers a variety of flora, fauna as well as natural scenery. There is a natural green garden known as "Halima garden". The government has established some rest houses in the valley. GBPWD Resthouse is the oldest rest house in the valley. FCNA, GB Scouts & PAF had their own rest houses to serve the purpose. There are also several private accommodation facilities and hotels in the valley. Ski competitions are held at Naltar ski resort.

== Notable people ==
- Muhammad Karim - four-time Winter Olympian
- Muhammad Abbas - First Pakistani Winter Olympian at the 2010 Winter Olympics in Vancouver
- Amina Wali- South Asian Winter Games silver medalist
- Ifrah Wali - South Asian Winter Games gold medalist

== See also ==
- 2015 Pakistan Army Mil Mi-17 crash
- Nomal Valley
