= Lilac-throated roller =

Lilac-throated roller may refer to:

- Lilac-breasted roller, a species of bird found in sub-Saharan Africa and the southern Arabian Peninsula
- a subspecies of the purple roller, a bird found in sub-Saharan Africa
