= Coracias chauvireae =

Coracias chauvireae Temporal range: Early Pleistocene

Scientific classification
- Kingdom: Animalia
- Phylum: Chordata
- Class: Aves
- Order: Coraciiformes
- Family: Coraciidae
- Genus: Coracias
- Species: †C. chauvireae

Binomial name
- †Coracias chauvireae Zelenkov, 2026

Extinct bird species

Coracias chauvireae is an extinct species of bird in the family Coraciidae (rollers). It was described in 2026 by N. Zelenkov based on a tarsometatarsus found from the Early Pleistocene deposits of the Taurida Cave in the central Crimean Peninsula. It is currently the oldest evidence of the genus Coracias from Eurasia. It is closely related to the clade containing the modern lilac-breasted roller (C. caudatus) and European roller (C. garrulus), which originated in Africa.
