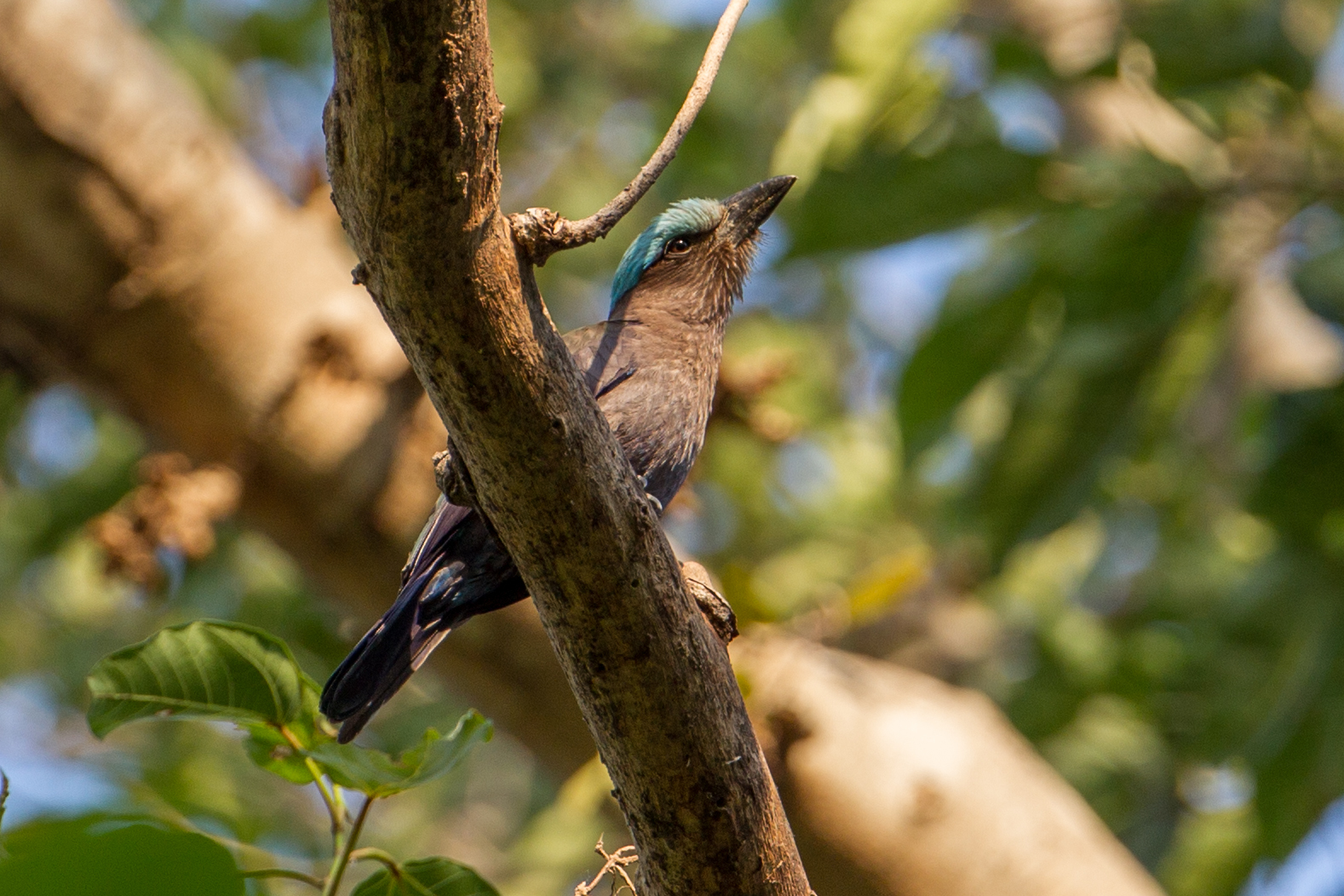

Conservation status
- Least Concern (IUCN 3.1)

Scientific classification
- Kingdom: Animalia
- Phylum: Chordata
- Class: Aves
- Order: Coraciiformes
- Family: Coraciidae
- Genus: Coracias
- Species: C. temminckii

Binomial name
- Coracias temminckii (Vieillot, 1819)
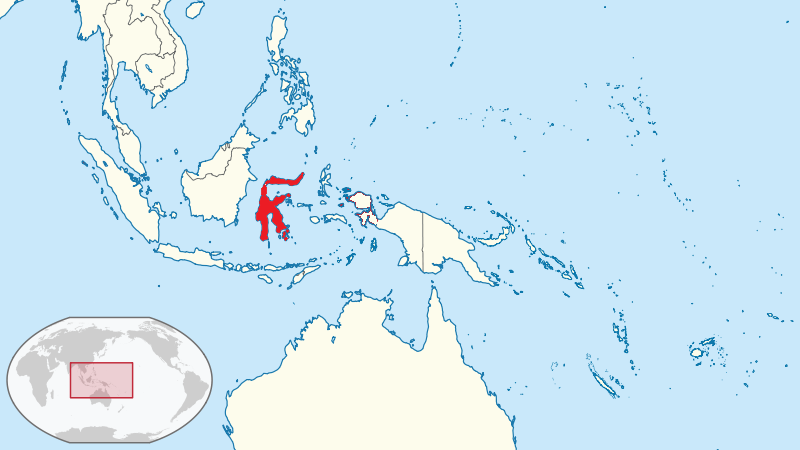

Synonyms
- Garrulus temminckii

= Purple-winged roller =

Species of bird

Purple-winged Roller

The purple-winged roller (Coracias temminckii) is a species of bird in the family Coraciidae. It is endemic to the Sulawesi subregion in Indonesia and can be found on the islands of Sulawesi, Bangka, Lembeh, Manterawu, Muna and Butung.

Its natural habitat is subtropical or tropical moist lowland forests.

== Taxonomy and systematics ==
The purple-winged roller was formally described in 1819 by the French ornithologist Louis Pierre Vieillot under the binomial name Garrulus temminckii. The specific epithet was chosen to honour the Dutch ornithologist Coenraad Jacob Temminck. The type locality is the island of Sulawesi. The purple-winged roller is now one of nine species placed in the genus Coracias that was introduced by Carl Linnaeus in 1758. A molecular phylogenetic study published in 2018 found that the purple-winged roller was most closely related to the Indochinese roller (Coracias affinis).

The phylogenetic relationships among the Coracias species are shown below, from the molecular study by Johansson et al. (2018)

- Coracias
  - Blue-bellied roller – C. cyanogaster
  - - - Purple roller – C. naevius
      - Racket-tailed roller – C. spatulatus
    - - - Indian roller – C. benghalensis
        - - Indochinese roller – C. affinis
          - Purple-winged roller – C. temminckii
      - - Lilac-breasted roller – C. caudatus
        - - Abyssinian roller – C. abyssinicus
          - European roller – C. garrulus

Alternate names for the purple-winged roller include the Celebes roller, Sulawesi roller, and Temminck's roller.

== Description ==
The purple-winged roller is 30–34 cm (12–13 in) in length, similar in size to the Eurasian jay. The cap and upper-tail coverts are bright azure blue, the back is dark-olive, with the rest of the plumage mainly dark blue. The large bill is black. The sexes are alike. Juveniles are similar to the adults but with duller plumage.
