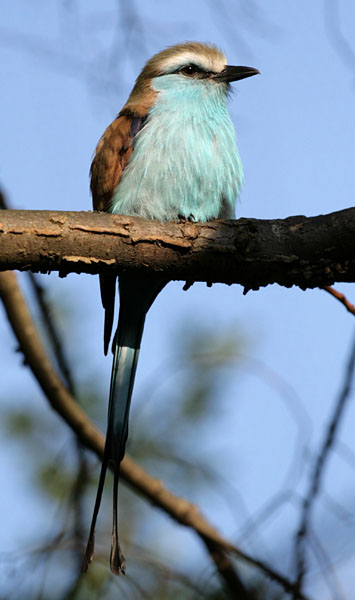

Conservation status
- Least Concern (IUCN 3.1)

Scientific classification
- Kingdom: Animalia
- Phylum: Chordata
- Class: Aves
- Order: Coraciiformes
- Family: Coraciidae
- Genus: Coracias
- Species: C. spatulatus

Binomial name
- Coracias spatulatus Trimen, 1880
- Geographic distribution shown in green

Synonyms
- Coracias spatulata

= Racket-tailed roller =

Species of bird

The racket-tailed roller (Coracias spatulatus) is a species of bird in the family Coraciidae. It is found in southern Africa from Angola, south-eastern Democratic Republic of Congo and southern Tanzania to northern Botswana, Zimbabwe, Malawi and Mozambique.

== Taxonomy and systematics ==
The racket-tailed roller was formally described in 1880 by the naturalist Roland Trimen under its current binomial name Coracias spatulatus from a specimen collected near the Zambezi River in southern Africa. The specific epithet spatulatus is Modern Latin meaning "spatulate" or "spoon-shaped". The species is monotypic: no subspecies are recognised. A molecular phylogenetic study published in 2018 found that the racket-tailed roller was most closely related to the purple roller (Coracias naevius).

The phylogenetic relationships among the Coracias species are shown below, from the molecular study by Johansson et al. (2018)

- Coracias
  - Blue-bellied roller – C. cyanogaster
  - - - Purple roller – C. naevius
      - Racket-tailed roller – C. spatulatus
    - - - Indian roller – C. benghalensis
        - - Indochinese roller – C. affinis
          - Purple-winged roller – C. temminckii
      - - Lilac-breasted roller – C. caudatus
        - - Abyssinian roller – C. abyssinicus
          - European roller – C. garrulus

Alternate names for the racket-tailed roller include the Angola racket-tailed roller and Weigall's roller.

== Description ==
The racket-tailed roller is so named for the conspicuous elongated outer feathers on its tail which have long streamers ending in paddle-shaped tips. The bird is 28 to 30 cm (11 to 12 in) long with the streamers extending another 8 cm (3 in). The forehead and superciliary streak are white, the crown dull green, the back rufous and the tail blue. The underparts are pale blue with whitish streaking. In flight, the purple upper wing with its azure-blue stripe can be seen. The under wing is pale blue with a purplish-black trailing edge and tip. The bird somewhat resembles the European roller (Coracias garrulus) and the lilac-breasted roller (Coracias caudatus), but those species lack the distinctive tail streamers. The beak is black, the eye brownish and the legs are dull yellowish. The juvenile is similar to the adult but less vivid, and lacks the attenuated tail feathers. The voice is a harsh guttural shriek, uttered as it swoops down.

== Behaviour and ecology ==
Similar to other members of Coracias, this species hunts for prey from a perch in the mid-storey region of woodland. When it spots something edible on the forest floor it swoops down to grab the prey. The diet consists mainly of grasshoppers, beetles, insect larvae, scorpions and small lizards. This roller is usually a solitary bird or occurs in pairs, but may form small groups of six or seven birds. It is a territorial species, driving away intruders by rocketing from a height with a raucous screech, rolling from side to side as it levels off, before using its momentum to rise to a perch. It nests in a cavity in a tree trunk or branch about 7 m (23 ft) off the ground, often using a disused nest of a woodpecker or barbet. The clutch is laid in the unlined cavity and usually consists of three or four eggs, but little is known of the nesting habits of this species.

== Status ==
The racket-tailed roller is a fairly common species with a very wide range. The population trend is thought to be declining because of loss of the forest habitat, especially miombo and mopane woodland. However, no particular threats have been identified and the International Union for Conservation of Nature has assessed the bird's conservation status as being of "least concern".
