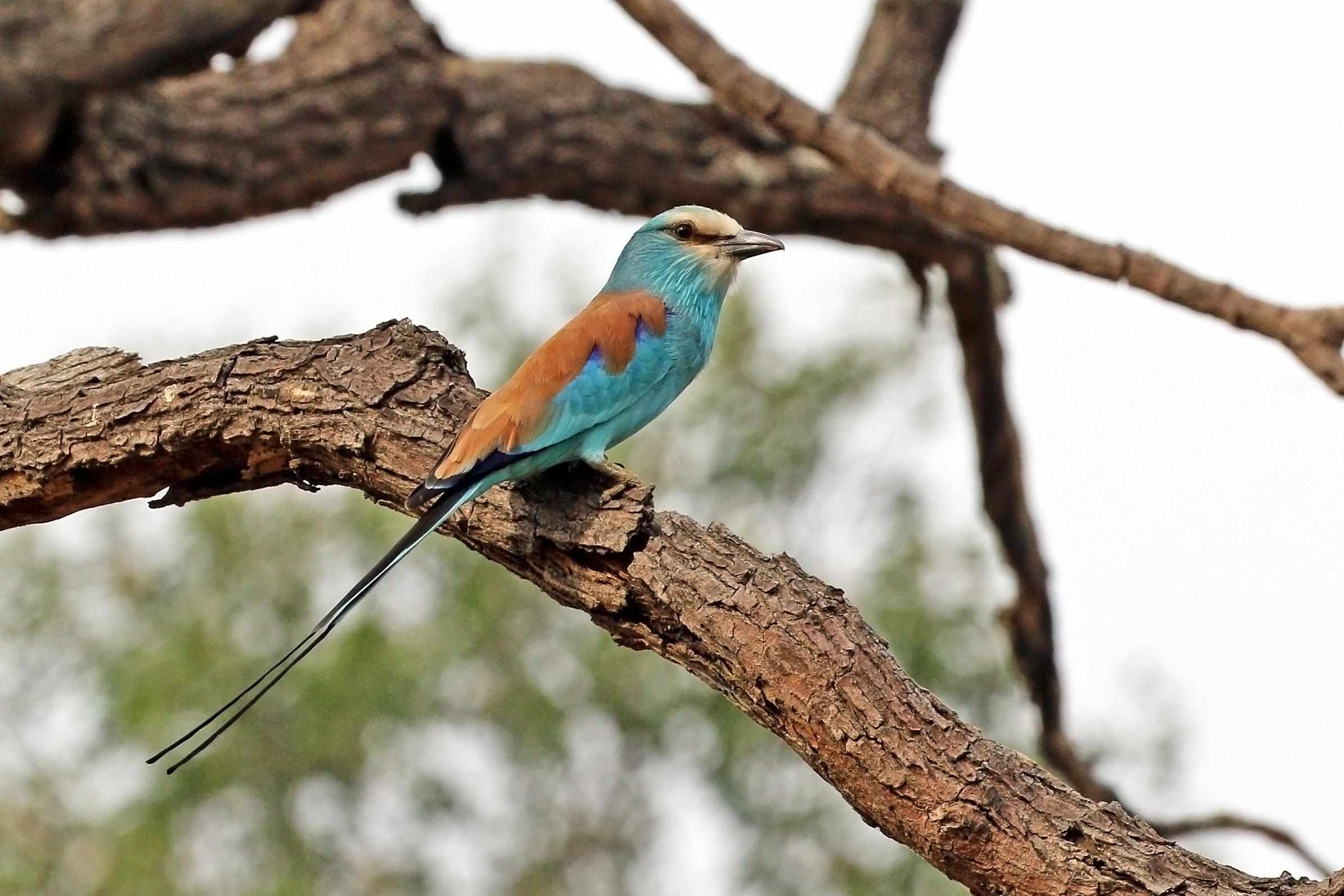
- In Senegal

Conservation status
- Least Concern (IUCN 3.1)

Scientific classification
- Kingdom: Animalia
- Phylum: Chordata
- Class: Aves
- Order: Coraciiformes
- Family: Coraciidae
- Genus: Coracias
- Species: C. abyssinicus

Binomial name
- Coracias abyssinicus Hermann, 1783

Synonyms
- Coracias abyssinica

= Abyssinian roller =

Species of bird

The Abyssinian roller (Coracias abyssinicus), or Senegal roller, is a member of the roller family of birds which breeds across tropical Africa in a belt south of the Sahara, known as the Sahel. It is resident in the southern part of its range, but northern breeding populations are short-distance migrants, moving further south after the wet season.

== Taxonomy ==
The phylogenetic relationships among the Coracias species are shown below, from the molecular study by Johansson et al. (2018)

- Coracias
  - Blue-bellied roller – C. cyanogaster
  - - - Purple roller – C. naevius
      - Racket-tailed roller – C. spatulatus
    - - - Indian roller – C. benghalensis
        - - Indochinese roller – C. affinis
          - Purple-winged roller – C. temminckii
      - - Lilac-breasted roller – C. caudatus
        - - Abyssinian roller – C. abyssinicus
          - European roller – C. garrulus

== Description ==
The Abyssinian roller is a large bird, nearly the size of a jackdaw at 28–30 cm (11–12 in). It has a warm brown back, with the rest of the plumage mainly blue. Adults have 12 cm (4.7 in) long tail streamers. Sexes are similar, but the juvenile is a drabber version of the adult. Abyssinian roller is striking in its strong direct flight, with the brilliant blues of the wings contrasting with the brown back and the long tail streamers trailing behind. The call of the Abyssinian roller is a harsh crow-like gak sound, or a screeched aaaargh.

== Distribution and habitat ==
The Abyssinian roller is native to tropical Africa. Its range extends from southern Mauritania and Senegal in the west and to Ethiopia, Somalia and northern Kenya in the east. It also occurs in south-western Saudi Arabia and western Yemen. This is a common bird of warm open country with some trees, and has adapted to farmland and human habitation.

== Behaviour and ecology ==
Abyssinian rollers often perch prominently on trees, posts or overhead wires, like giant shrikes, whilst watching for the large insects and small rodents on which they feed. They will dash into the smoke of a forest fire for disturbed invertebrates. They are fearless, and will dive and roll at humans and other intruders. The display of this bird is a lapwing-like display, with the twists and turns that give this group its English name. It nests in a scantily lined hole in a tree or building, and lays three to six eggs.

== Status ==
The population trend for the Abyssinian roller is thought to be upward, as it exploits the opportunities provided by modern agricultural practices and urbanization. It has an extensive range, and the International Union for Conservation of Nature has rated its conservation status as being of "least concern".
