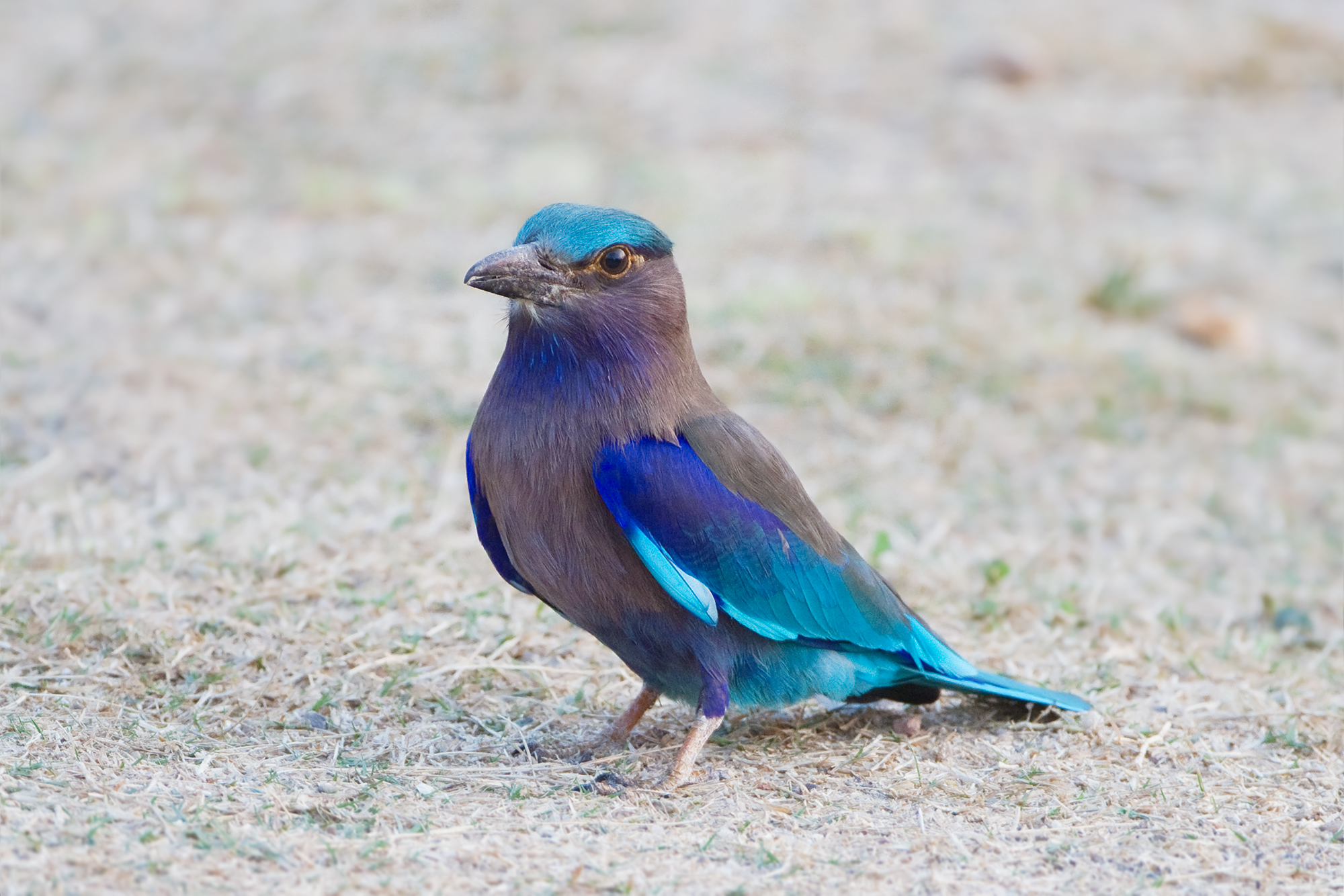
- from Thailand

Conservation status
- Least Concern (IUCN 3.1)

Scientific classification
- Kingdom: Animalia
- Phylum: Chordata
- Class: Aves
- Order: Coraciiformes
- Family: Coraciidae
- Genus: Coracias
- Species: C. affinis

Binomial name
- Coracias affinis Horsfield, 1840
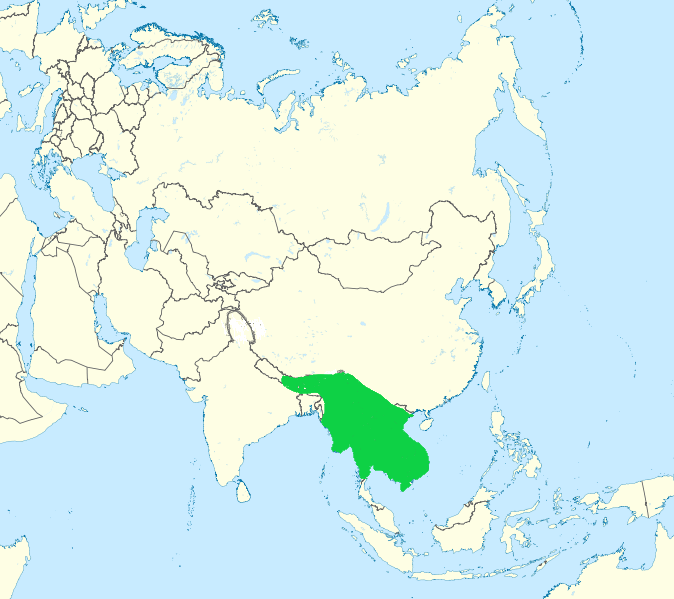

= Indochinese roller =

Species of bird

The Indochinese roller (Coracias affinis) or Burmese roller, is a member of the roller bird family. It occurs widely from Nepal, eastern India to Myanmar and Southeast Asia. It is listed as Least Concern on the IUCN Red List.

== Taxonomy ==
The Indochinese roller was formally described in 1840 by the American naturalist Thomas Horsfield under the binomial name Coracias affinis based on specimens that had been collected in Assam by the naturalist John McClelland. The specific epithet affinis is from Latin adfinis or affinis meaning "related" or "allied".

McClelland has sometimes been credited as the authority but under the rules of the International Code of Zoological Nomenclature Horsfield now receives the credit. The Indochinese roller was formerly considered as a subspecies of the Indian roller because of a narrow hybrid zone in northeast India but a molecular phylogenetic study published in 2018 found that the Indochinese roller was more closely related to the purple-winged roller (Coracias temminckii) than it is to the Indian roller. The Indochinese roller is monotypic: no subspecies are recognised.

The phylogenetic relationships among the Coracias species are shown below, from the molecular study by Johansson et al. (2018)

- Coracias
  - Blue-bellied roller – C. cyanogaster
  - - - Purple roller – C. naevius
      - Racket-tailed roller – C. spatulatus
    - - - Indian roller – C. benghalensis
        - - Indochinese roller – C. affinis
          - Purple-winged roller – C. temminckii
      - - Lilac-breasted roller – C. caudatus
        - - Abyssinian roller – C. abyssinicus
          - European roller – C. garrulus

== Description ==
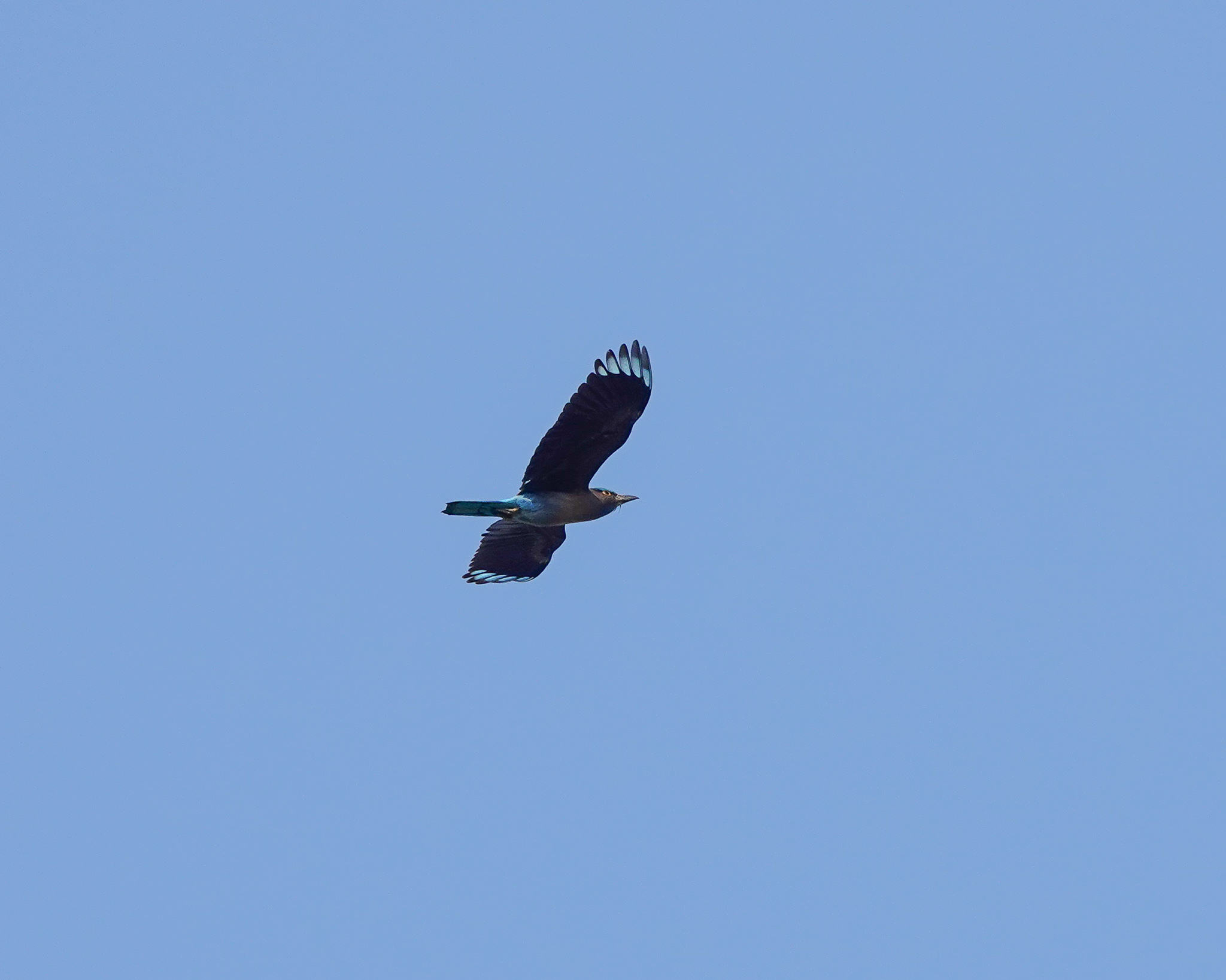
A flying Coracias affinis in Assam, India

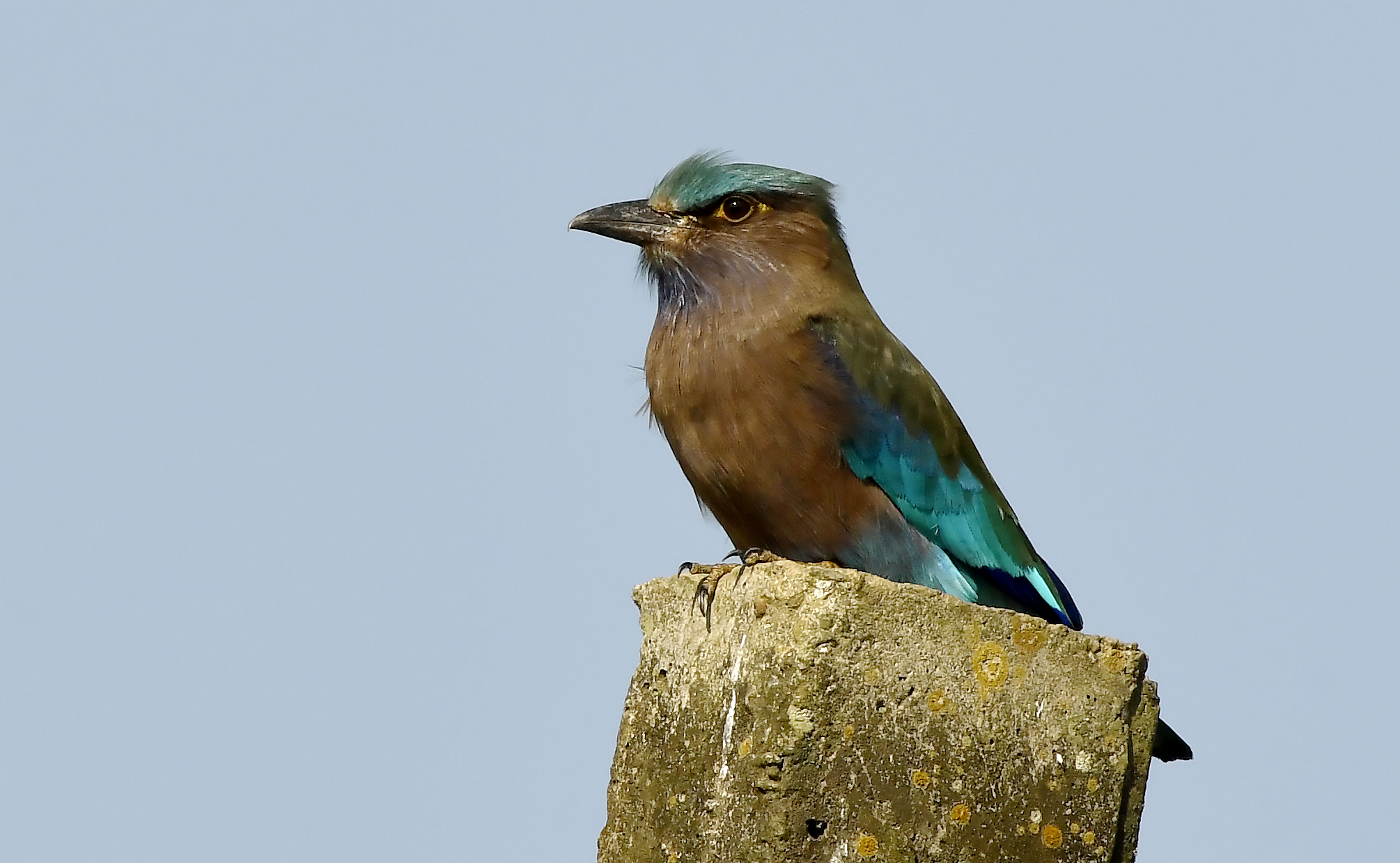
In Kaziranga National Park, Assam, India

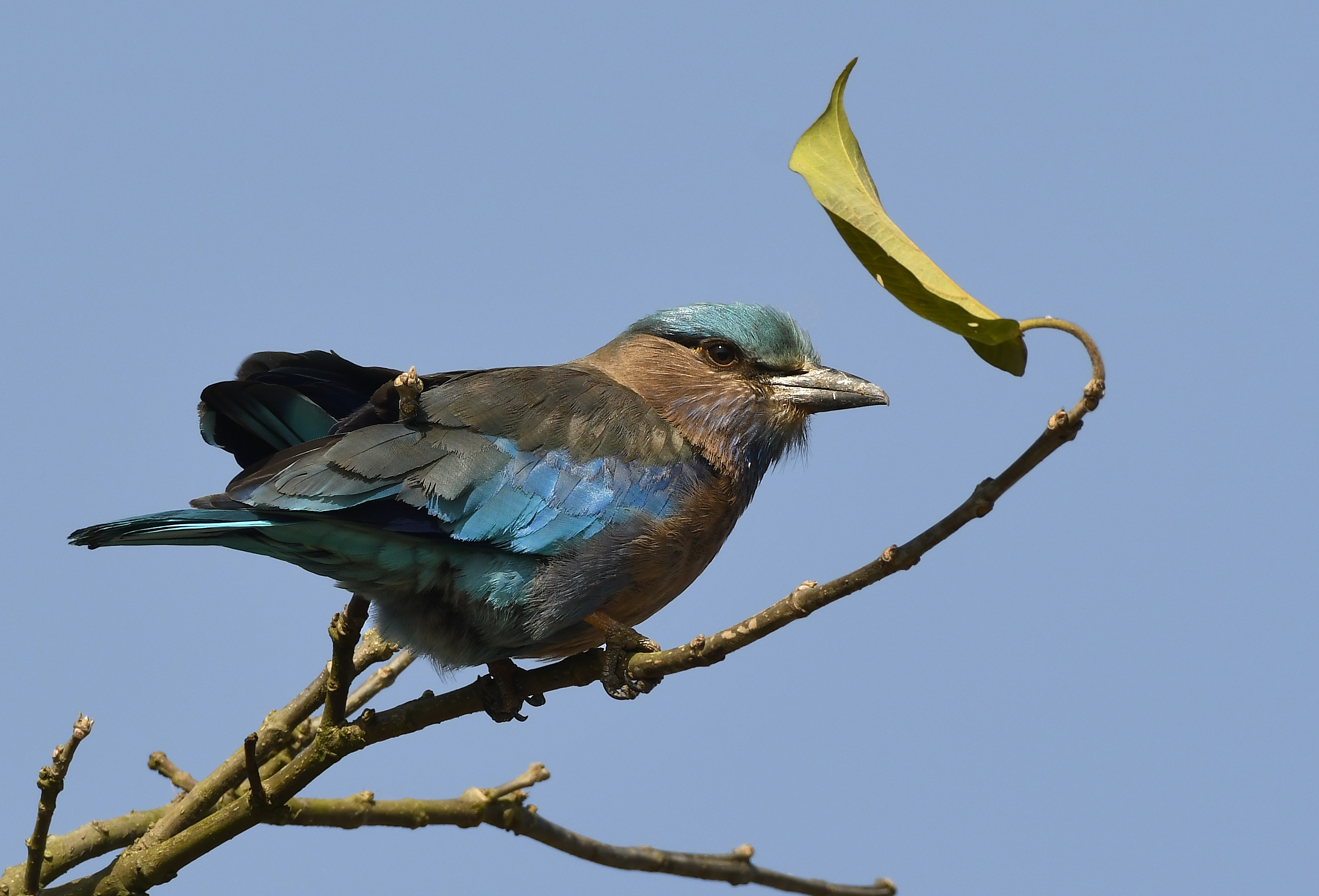
In Kaziranga National Park, Assam, India

It is a stocky bird. The crown and vent are blue. The primaries are deep purplish blue with a band of pale blue. The tail is sky blue with a terminal band of Prussian blue and the central feathers are dull green. The neck and throat are purplish lilac with white shaft streaks. The bare patch around the eye is ochre in colour. The three forward toes are united at the base. Rollers have a long and compressed bill with a curved upper edge and a hooked tip. The nostril is long and exposed and there are long rictal bristles at the base of the bill. It has a purplish brown and unstreaked face and breast. It has underwing coverts in a deep shade of blue.

== Distribution and habitat ==
The Indochinese roller is distributed across Asia, from eastern India into Southeast Asia.
