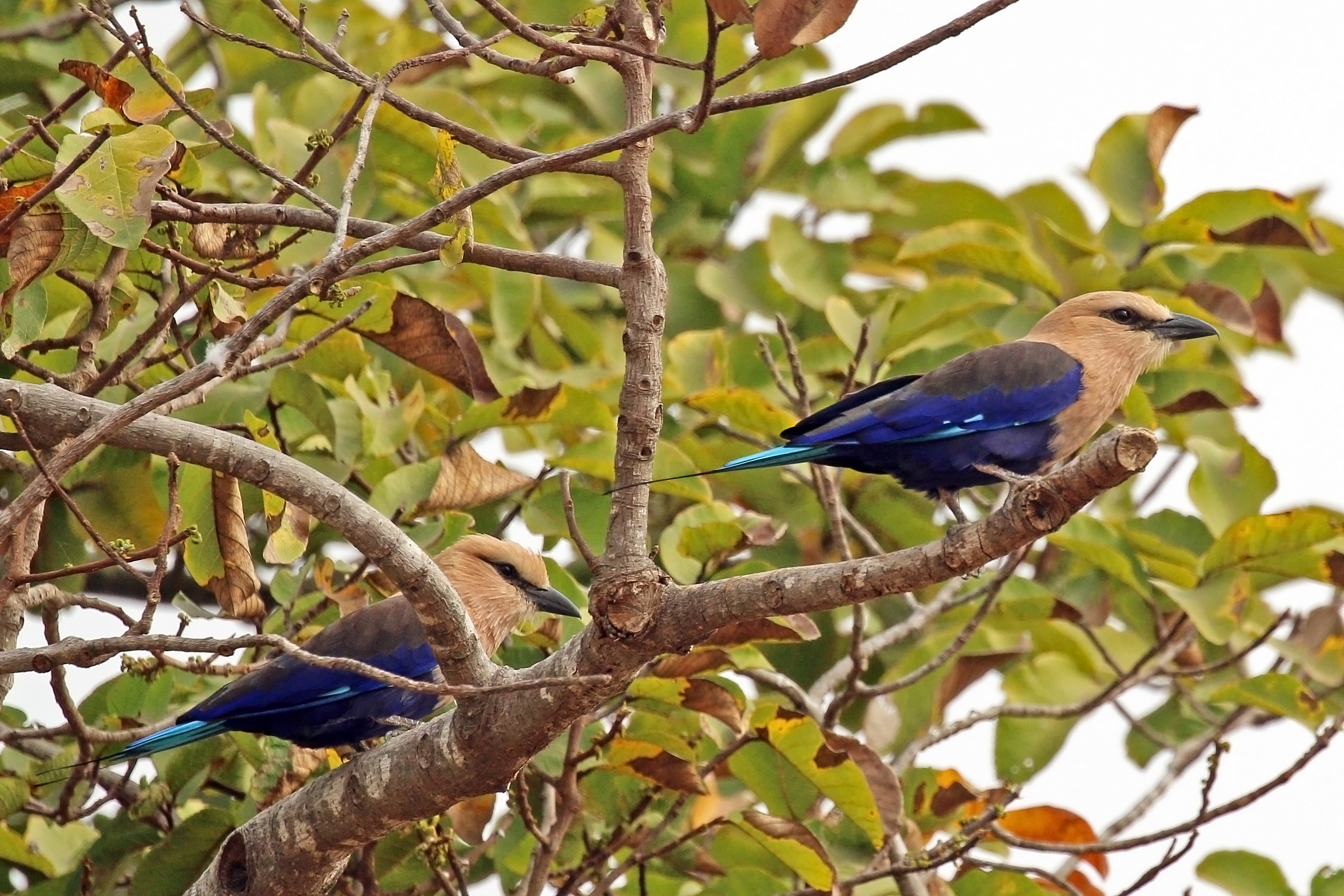
- Pair in The Gambia

Conservation status
- Least Concern (IUCN 3.1)

Scientific classification
- Kingdom: Animalia
- Phylum: Chordata
- Class: Aves
- Order: Coraciiformes
- Family: Coraciidae
- Genus: Coracias
- Species: C. cyanogaster

Binomial name
- Coracias cyanogaster Cuvier, 1816
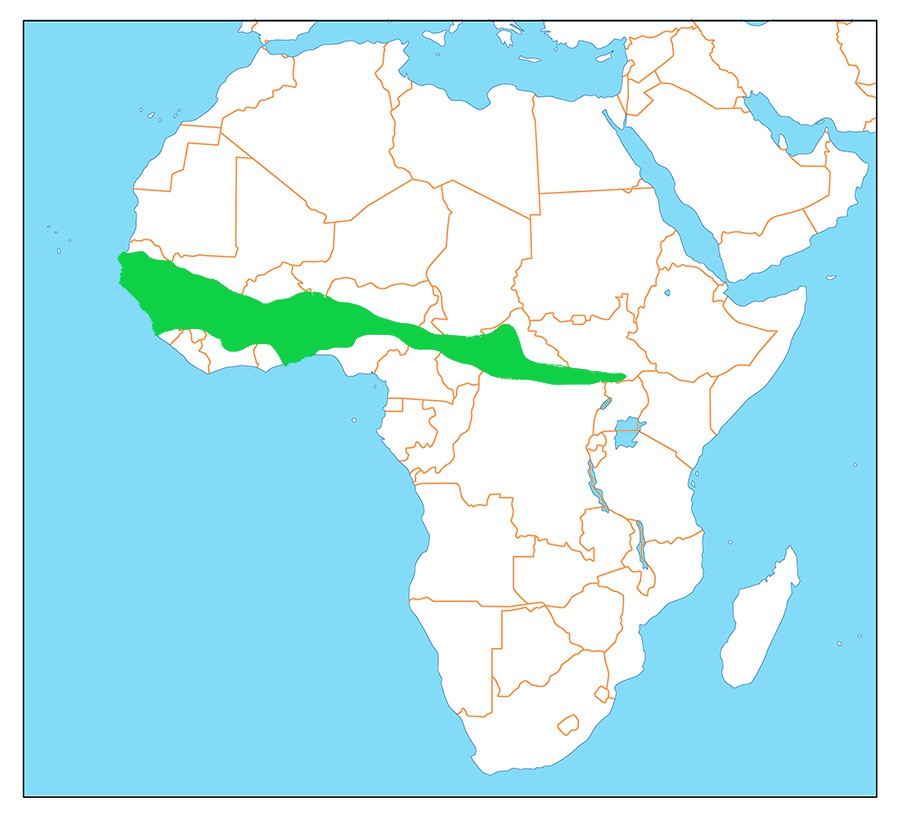
- Geographic distribution shown in green

= Blue-bellied roller =

Species of bird

The blue-bellied roller (Coracias cyanogaster) is a member of the roller family of birds which breeds across Africa in a narrow belt from Senegal to northeast Democratic Republic of the Congo. It is resident, apart from some local seasonal movements, in mature moist savannah dominated by Isoberlinia trees.

== Taxonomy ==
The blue-bellied roller was given the binomial name Coracias cyanogaster in 1816 by the French naturalist Georges Cuvier based on "Le Rollier à ventre bleu" that had been described and illustrated by François Levaillant in 1806. The specific epithet combines the Ancient Greek kuanos meaning "dark-blue" with gastēr meaning "belly". Levaillant mistaken believed that the specimen had been collected on the island of Java. The species is resident in West-Africa and the type location was later designated as Senegal. The species is monotypic: no subspecies are recognised.

The phylogenetic relationships among the Coracias species are shown below, from the molecular study by Johansson et al. (2018)

- Coracias
  - Blue-bellied roller – C. cyanogaster
  - - - Purple roller – C. naevius
      - Racket-tailed roller – C. spatulatus
    - - - Indian roller – C. benghalensis
        - - Indochinese roller – C. affinis
          - Purple-winged roller – C. temminckii
      - - Lilac-breasted roller – C. caudatus
        - - Abyssinian roller – C. abyssinicus
          - European roller – C. garrulus

== Description ==
The blue-bellied roller is a large bird, nearly the size of a jackdaw at 28–30 cm (11–12 in). It has a very dark brown back, buffy or chalky white head, neck and breast, with the rest of the plumage mainly blue. Adults have 6 cm (2.4 in) tail streamers. Sexes are similar, but the juvenile is a drabber version of the adult.

The blue-bellied roller is striking in its strong direct flight, with the brilliant blues of the wings contrasting with the dark back and cream colored head, and the tail streamers trailing behind.

The call of blue-bellied roller is a harsh clicking ga-ga-ga sound.

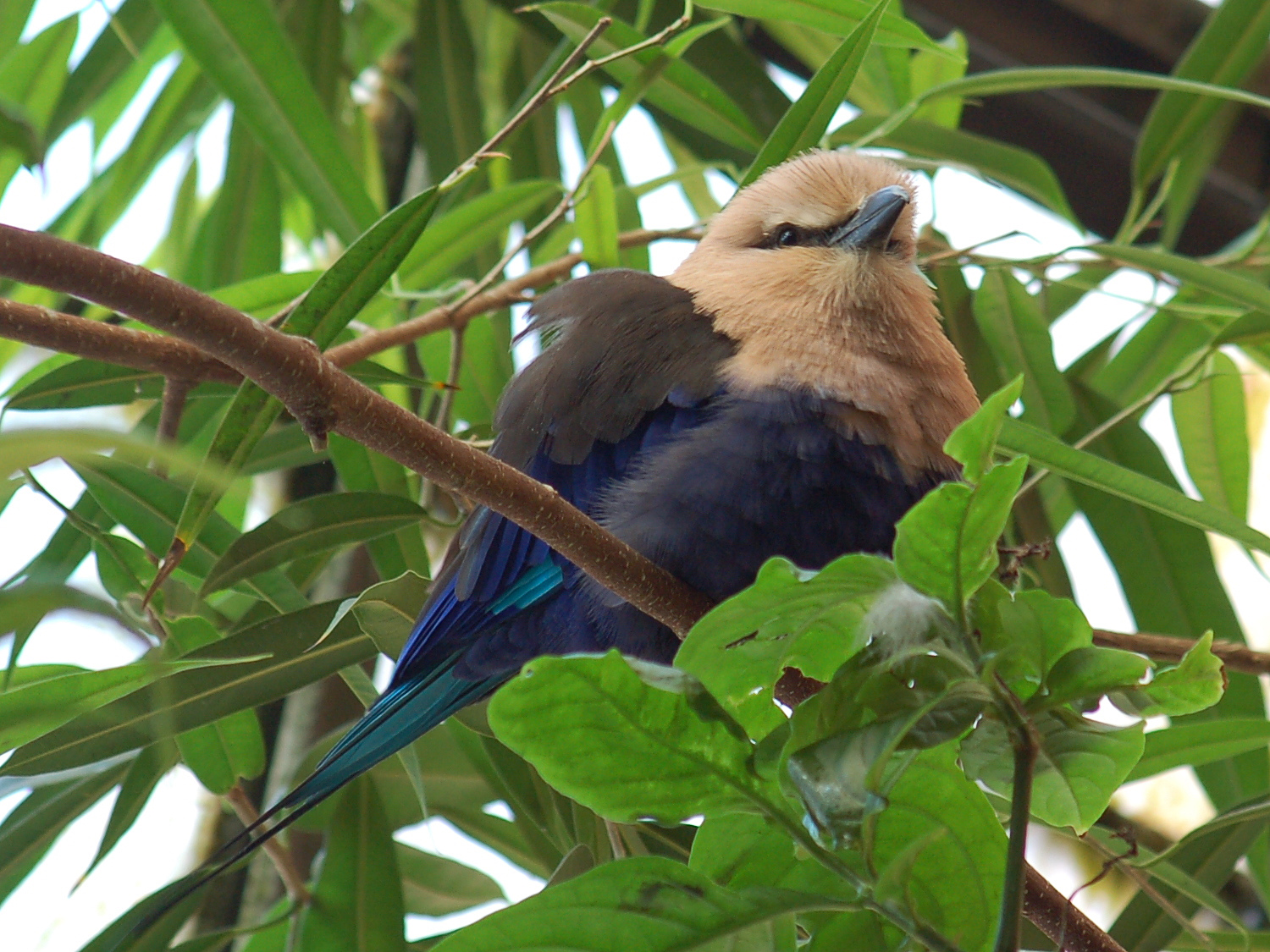
Fluffing its feathers

== Distribution and habitat ==
This is a common bird of warm open country with some trees. These rollers often perch prominently on trees, posts, or overhead wires, like giant shrikes, whilst watching for the grasshoppers and other large insects on which they feed.

== Behaviour and ecology ==
The display of this bird is a lapwing-like display, with the twists and turns that give this species its English name. It nests in a hole in a tree - a tree cavity.

== Status ==
Widespread and common throughout its large range, the blue-bellied roller is evaluated as Least Concern on the IUCN Red List of Threatened Species.

== In captivity ==
The blue-bellied roller is kept in some zoos, open air aviaries and similar educational facilities. There are instances of the bird escaping captivity and adjusting to the local environment. In Nepalganj area of Joka, Kolkata, two blue-bellied rollers have been spotted since May 2023 that have adapted to the local environment.
