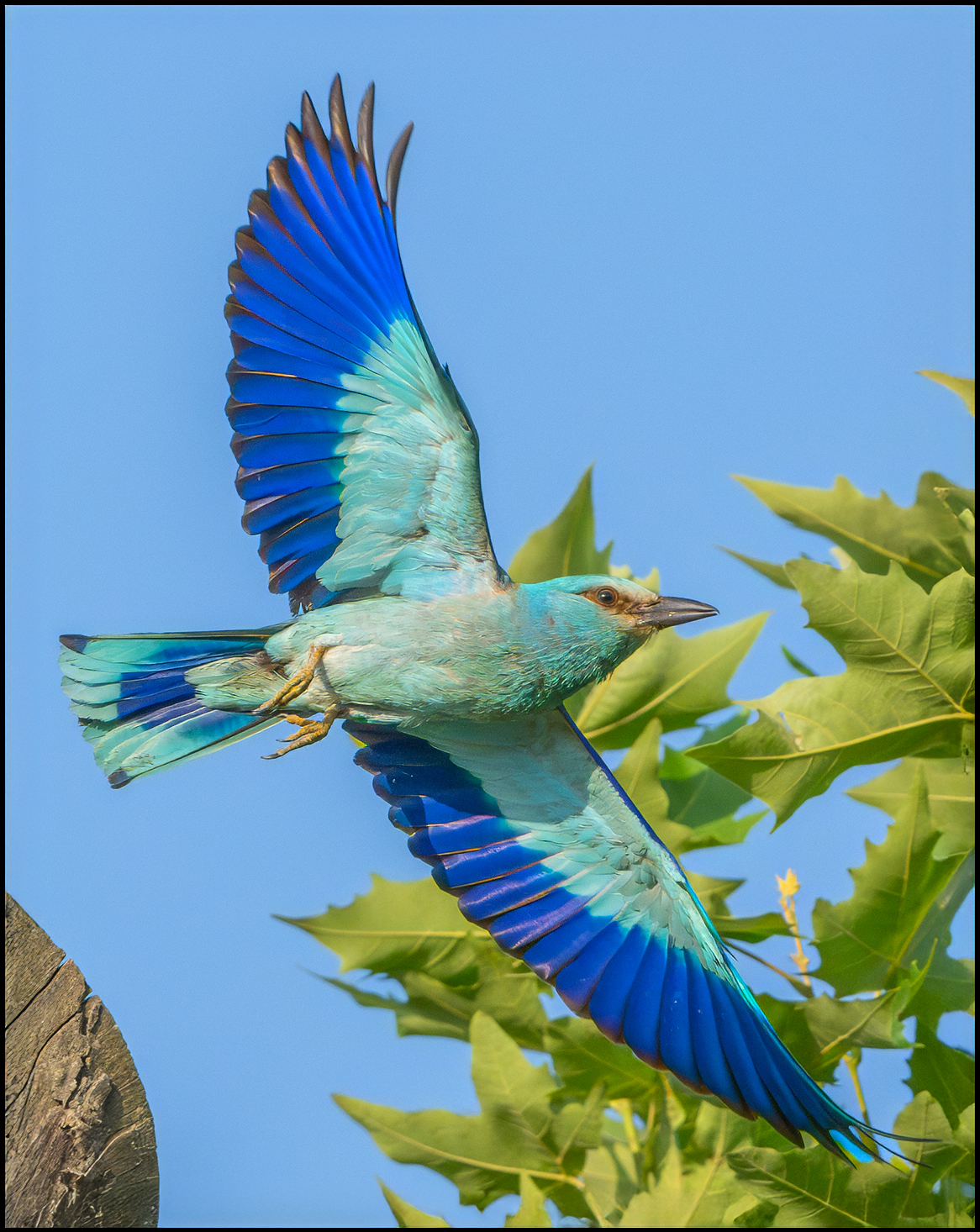
- Adult European roller

Scientific classification
- Kingdom: Animalia
- Phylum: Chordata
- Class: Aves
- Order: Coraciiformes
- Family: Coraciidae
- Genus: Coracias; Linnaeus, 1758

Type species
- Coracias garrulus (European roller) Linnaeus, 1758

Species
- 10, see text

Synonyms
- Galgulus Brisson, 1760

= Coracias =

Coracias Temporal range: Early Pleistocene–Present

Genus of birds

Coracias is a genus of the rollers, an Old World family of birds related to the kingfishers and bee-eaters. They share the colourful appearance of those groups, blues and browns predominating. The two outer front toes are connected, but not the inner one.

== Taxonomy ==
The genus Coracias was introduced in 1758 by the Swedish naturalist Carl Linnaeus in the tenth edition of his Systema Naturae. The genus name is from Ancient Greek korakías (κορακίας), derived from korax (κόραξ, ‘raven, crow’). Aristotle described the coracias as a bird as big as a crow with a red beak, which some believe to be the chough. The type species was designated as the European roller (Coracias garrulus) by George Robert Gray in 1855.

The phylogenetic relationships among the Coracias species are shown below, from the molecular study by Johansson et al. (2018)

- Coracias
  - Blue-bellied roller – C. cyanogaster
  - - - Purple roller – C. naevius
      - Racket-tailed roller – C. spatulatus
    - - - Indian roller – C. benghalensis
        - - Indochinese roller – C. affinis
          - Purple-winged roller – C. temminckii
      - - Lilac-breasted roller – C. caudatus
        - - Abyssinian roller – C. abyssinicus
          - European roller – C. garrulus

=== Species ===
Nine species are recognized:

Genus Coracias – Linnaeus, 1758 – nine species
Common name	Scientific name and subspecies	Range	Size and ecology	IUCN status and estimated population
Purple roller	Coracias naevius (Daudin, 1800) Two subspecies: C. n. naevius – Daudin, 1800; C. n. mosambicus – Dresser, 1890	sub-Saharan Africa	Size: Habitat: Diet:	LC
Indian roller	Coracias benghalensis (Linnaeus, 1758) Two subspecies: C. b. benghalensis (Linnaeus, 1758); C. b. indicus Linnaeus, 1766	Western Asia to Indian Subcontinent	Size: Habitat: Diet:	NT
Indochinese roller	Coracias affinis Horsfield, 1840	eastern India to southeast Asia	Size: Habitat: Diet:	LC
Purple-winged roller	Coracias temminckii (Vieillot, 1819)	Islands of Sulawesi, Bangka, Lembeh, Manterawu, Muna and Butung	Size: Habitat: Diet:	LC
Racket-tailed roller	Coracias spatulatus Trimen, 1880	southern Africa from Angola, south-eastern Democratic Republic of Congo and southern Tanzania to northern Botswana, Zimbabwe, Malawi and Mozambique	Size: Habitat: Diet:	LC
Lilac-breasted roller	Coracias caudatus Linnaeus, 1766 Two subspecies: C. c. caudatus Linnaeus, 1766; C. c. lorti Shelley, 1885	sub-Saharan Africa and the southern Arabian Peninsula	Size: Habitat: Diet:	LC
Abyssinian roller	Coracias abyssinicus (Hermann, 1783)	tropical Africa in a belt south of the Sahara, known as the Sahel	Size: Habitat: Diet:	LC
European roller	Coracias garrulus (Linnaeus, 1758) Two subspecies: C. g. garrulus - Linnaeus, 1758; C. g. semenowi - Loudon & Tschusi, 1902	Middle East, Central Asia, Mediterranean and eastern Europe.	Size: Habitat: Diet:	LC
Blue-bellied roller	Coracias cyanogaster Cuvier, 1816	Senegal to northeast Democratic Republic of the Congo	Size: Habitat: Diet:	LC

=== Fossil species ===
- †Coracias chauvireae (Early Pleistocene of Crimea)

=== Former species ===
Formerly, some authorities also considered the following species (or subspecies) as species within the genus Coracias:

- Olive-backed oriole (as Coracias sagittata)
- Eurasian golden oriole (as Coracias oriolus)
- Black-hooded oriole (as Coracias xanthornus)
- Broad-billed roller (as Coracias glaucurus)
- Broad-billed roller (afer) (as Coracias afra)
- Oriental dollarbird (as Coracias orientalis)
- Australian roller (as Coracias pacifica)

== Behaviour and ecology ==
Coracias rollers are watch-and wait hunters. They sit in a tree or on a post before descending on their prey and carrying it back in the beak to a perch before dismembering it. A wide range of terrestrial invertebrates, and small vertebrates such as frogs, lizards rodents and young birds, are taken. Their prey includes items avoided by many other birds, such as hairy caterpillars, insects with warning colouration and snakes. They often perch prominently whilst hunting, like giant shrikes.
