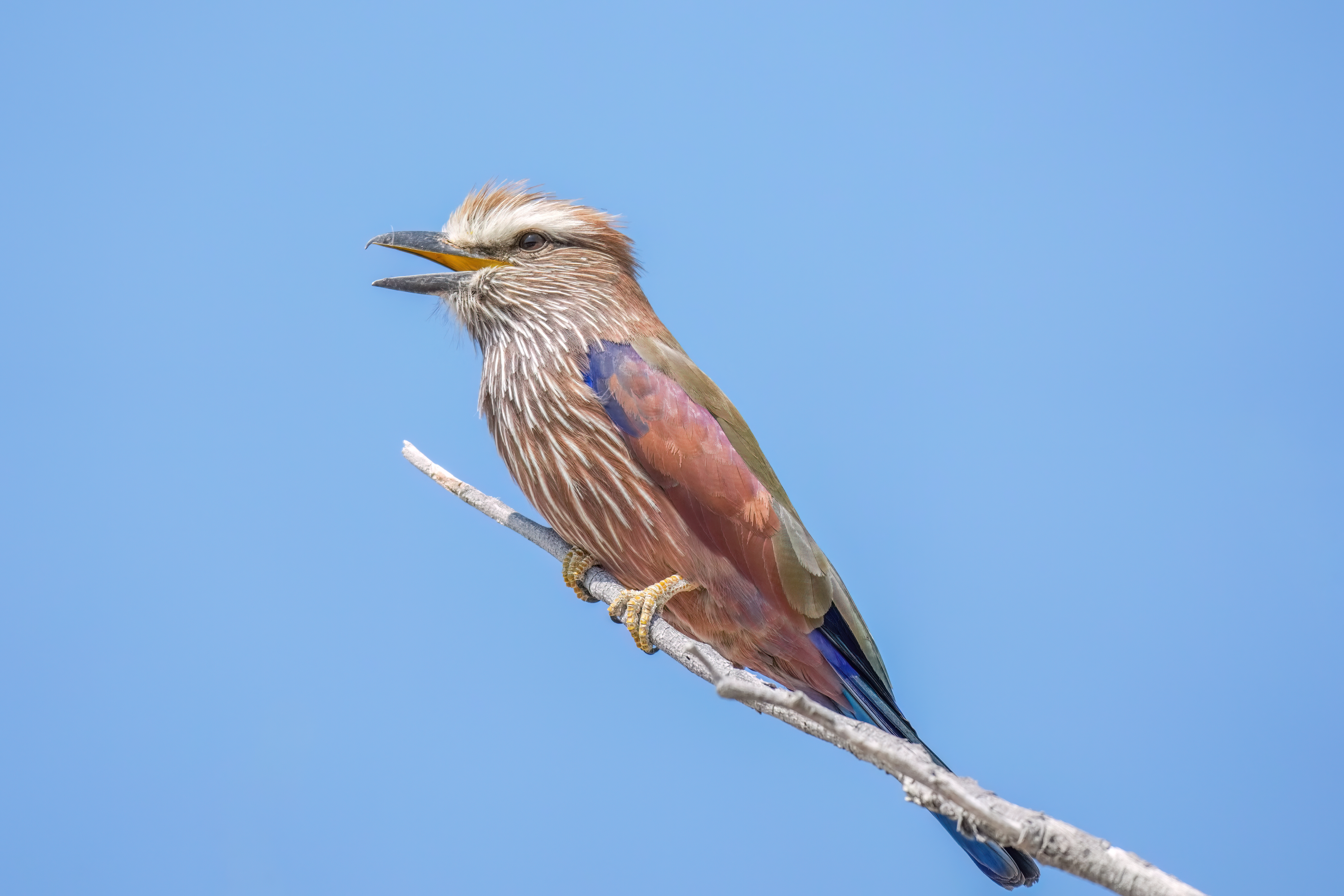
- Etosha National Park, Namibia

Conservation status
- Least Concern (IUCN 3.1)

Scientific classification
- Kingdom: Animalia
- Phylum: Chordata
- Class: Aves
- Order: Coraciiformes
- Family: Coraciidae
- Genus: Coracias
- Species: C. naevius

Binomial name
- Coracias naevius Daudin, 1800

Synonyms
- Coracias naevia; Coracias noevia; Coracias noevius

= Purple roller =

Species of bird

The name "purple roller" can also refer to the azure dollarbird (Eurystomus azureus) of Indonesia.

The purple roller (Coracias naevius), or rufous-crowned roller, is a medium-sized bird widespread in sub-Saharan Africa. Compared with other rollers its colours are rather dull and its voice harsh and grating.

== Taxonomy and systematics ==
The purple roller was formally described in 1800 by the French zoologist François Marie Daudin under the binomial name Coracias naevia. Daudin's description was based on a specimen collected in Senegal. The specific epithet is from Latin naevius meaning "spotted" or "marked". A molecular phylogenetic study published in 2018 found that the purple roller was most closely related to the racket-tailed roller (Coracias spatulatus).

The phylogenetic relationships among the Coracias species are shown below, from the molecular study by Johansson et al. (2018)

- Coracias
  - Blue-bellied roller – C. cyanogaster
  - - - Purple roller – C. naevius
      - Racket-tailed roller – C. spatulatus
    - - - Indian roller – C. benghalensis
        - - Indochinese roller – C. affinis
          - Purple-winged roller – C. temminckii
      - - Lilac-breasted roller – C. caudatus
        - - Abyssinian roller – C. abyssinicus
          - European roller – C. garrulus

Two subspecies are recognised:

- Lilac-throated roller (C. n. naevius) – Daudin, 1800: The common name for this subspecies is also used as an alternate name for the lilac-breasted roller. Found from Senegal and Gambia to Somalia and northern Tanzania
- C. n. mosambicus – Dresser, 1890: Originally described as a separate species. Found from Angola and southern Democratic Republic of Congo to Namibia northern South Africa

== Description ==
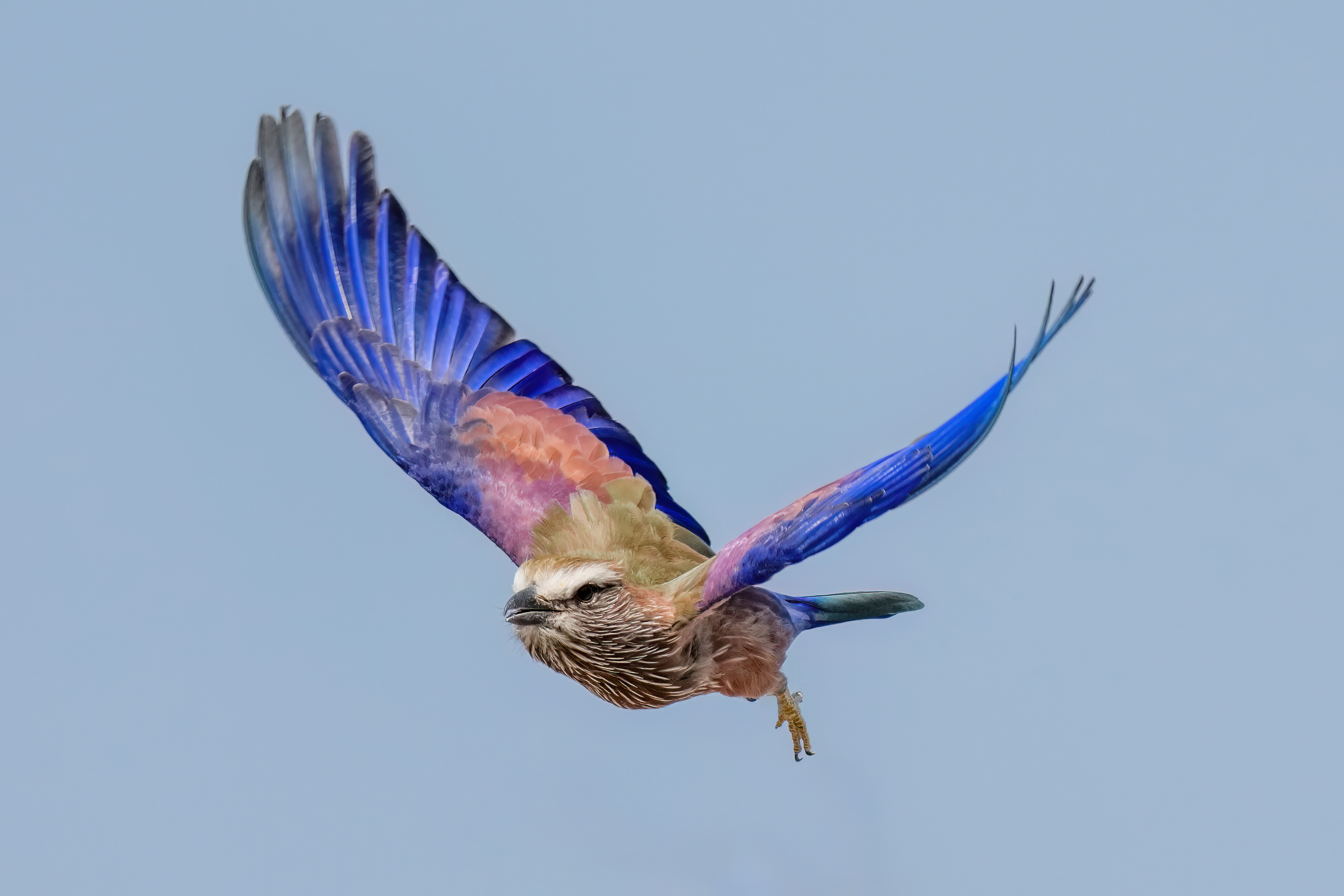
Purple roller in flight in Etosha National Park, Namibia

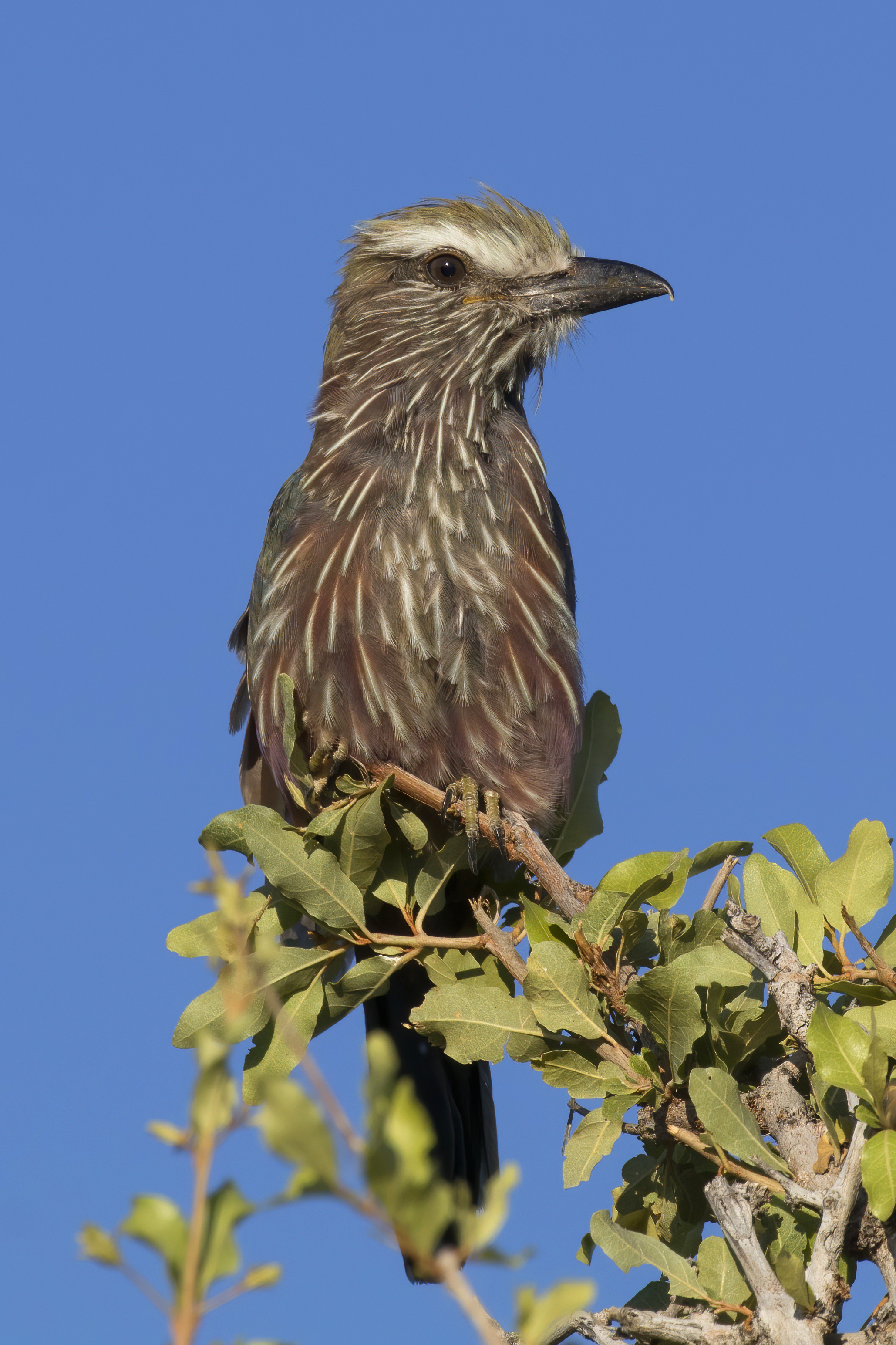
Purple roller in Etosha National Park, Namibia

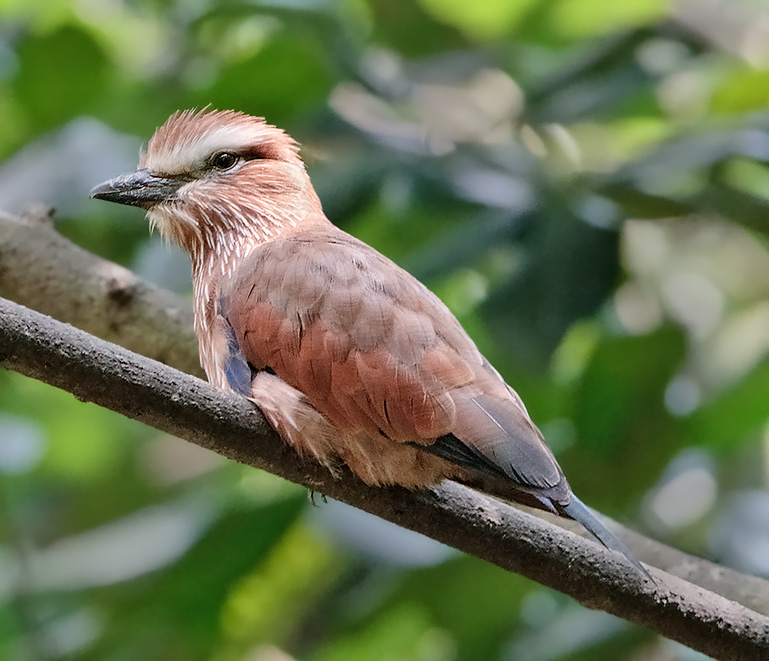
Purple roller, or rufous-crowned roller

The purple roller is the largest of the rollers, growing to a length of 35 to 40 cm (14 to 16 in). Adults weigh from 145 to 200 g (5.1 to 7.1 oz) with an average weight of 168 g (5.9 oz). From a distance it appears a dull brownish bird with a white stripe over the eye, a patch of white on the nape and a dark tail. Northern populations tend to have a rufus crown while southern populations have a more olive-green crown. The underparts are purplish-pink streaked with white. The wings are long and rounded while the tail is square-cut. The voice is a rather grating "ka" or "gaa", repeated rapidly and evenly.

== Behaviour and ecology ==
Its preferred habitat is dry thornveld where it spends long periods perched at the top of thorn trees or poles, watching for food items such as insects, spiders, scorpions and small lizards on the ground. It rocks to-and-fro about its longitudinal axis during display flights, calling raucously all the while; starting from above the treetops it plummets towards the ground in rolling flight. It is territorial, and during the breeding season will drive off other rollers, small hawks and crows.

This species seems to be an opportunist breeder, possibly linked to rains, as its breeding season varies from place to place. It nests in natural hollows in trees or uses old woodpecker holes, or in cliffs, riverbanks, pipes, or holes in masonry, usually laying three white eggs. The young are fed and incubated by both parents.
