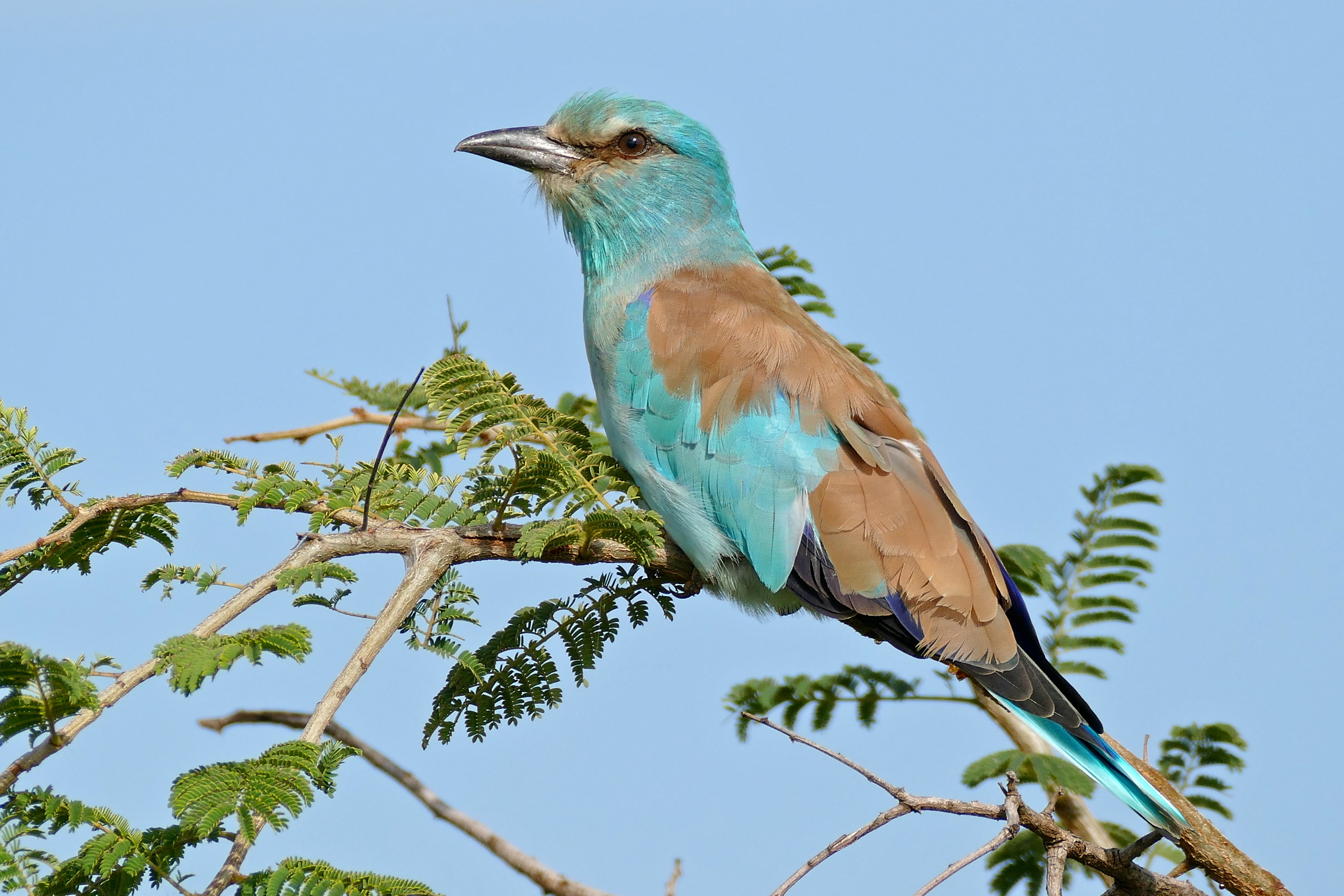
- European roller in Kruger National Park

Conservation status
- Least Concern (IUCN 3.1)

Scientific classification
- Kingdom: Animalia
- Phylum: Chordata
- Class: Aves
- Order: Coraciiformes
- Family: Coraciidae
- Genus: Coracias
- Species: C. garrulus

Binomial name
- Coracias garrulus Linnaeus, 1758

Subspecies
- C. g. garrulus; C. g. semenowi
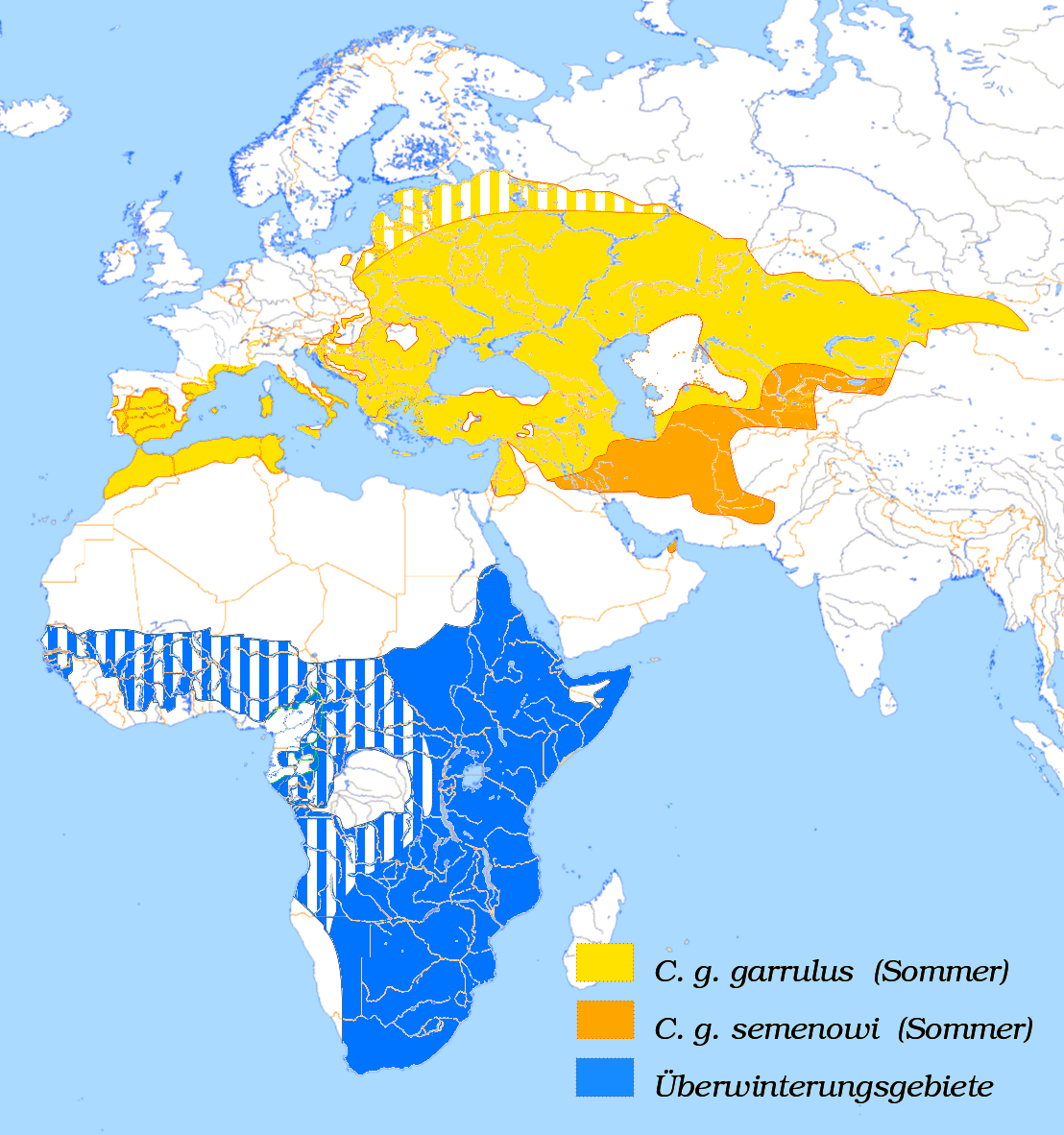
- Distribution of the European roller summer C. g. garrulus summer C. g. semenowi winter

= European roller =

Species of bird

The European roller (Coracias garrulus) is the only member of the roller family Coraciidae breeding in Europe. Its range extends into the Maghreb, West Asia and Central Asia. It winters in southern Africa, primarily in dry wooded savanna and bushy plains. It occurs in a wide variety of habitats, but avoids treeless plains. It usually nests in tree holes.

== Taxonomy and systematics ==
The European roller was formally described by the Swedish naturalist Carl Linnaeus in 1758 in the tenth edition of his Systema Naturae under its current binomial name Coracias garrulus. The type locality is Sweden. The generic name derives from Greek korakias referring to a type of corvid, perhaps the red-billed chough. The specific epithet garrulus is from Latin and means 'chattering' in reference to the bird's calls. Alternate English names include the blue roller, common roller, Eurasian roller, or simply roller.

A molecular phylogenetic study by Ulf Johansson and collaborators published in 2018 found that the European roller was most closely related to the Abyssinian roller (Coracias abyssinicus).

- Coracias
  - Blue-bellied roller – C. cyanogaster
  - - - Purple roller – C. naevius
      - Racket-tailed roller – C. spatulatus
    - - - Indian roller – C. benghalensis
        - - Indochinese roller – C. affinis
          - Purple-winged roller – C. temminckii
      - - Lilac-breasted roller – C. caudatus
        - - Abyssinian roller – C. abyssinicus
          - European roller – C. garrulus

The rollers are medium-sized Old World birds of open woodland habitats. They have brightly coloured plumage and a hooked bill. Most species are found south of the Sahara. The genus Coracias contains eight species of sit-and-wait hunters.

Two subspecies are recognised:

- C. g. garrulus Linnaeus, 1758: The nominate subspecies. Found in north-western Africa, southern Europe and east through north-western Iran to south-western Siberia.
- C. g. semenowi Loudon & Tschusi, 1902: It is found in Iraq and southern Iran east through Kashmir and southern Kazakhstan to Xinjiang in western China.

== Description ==
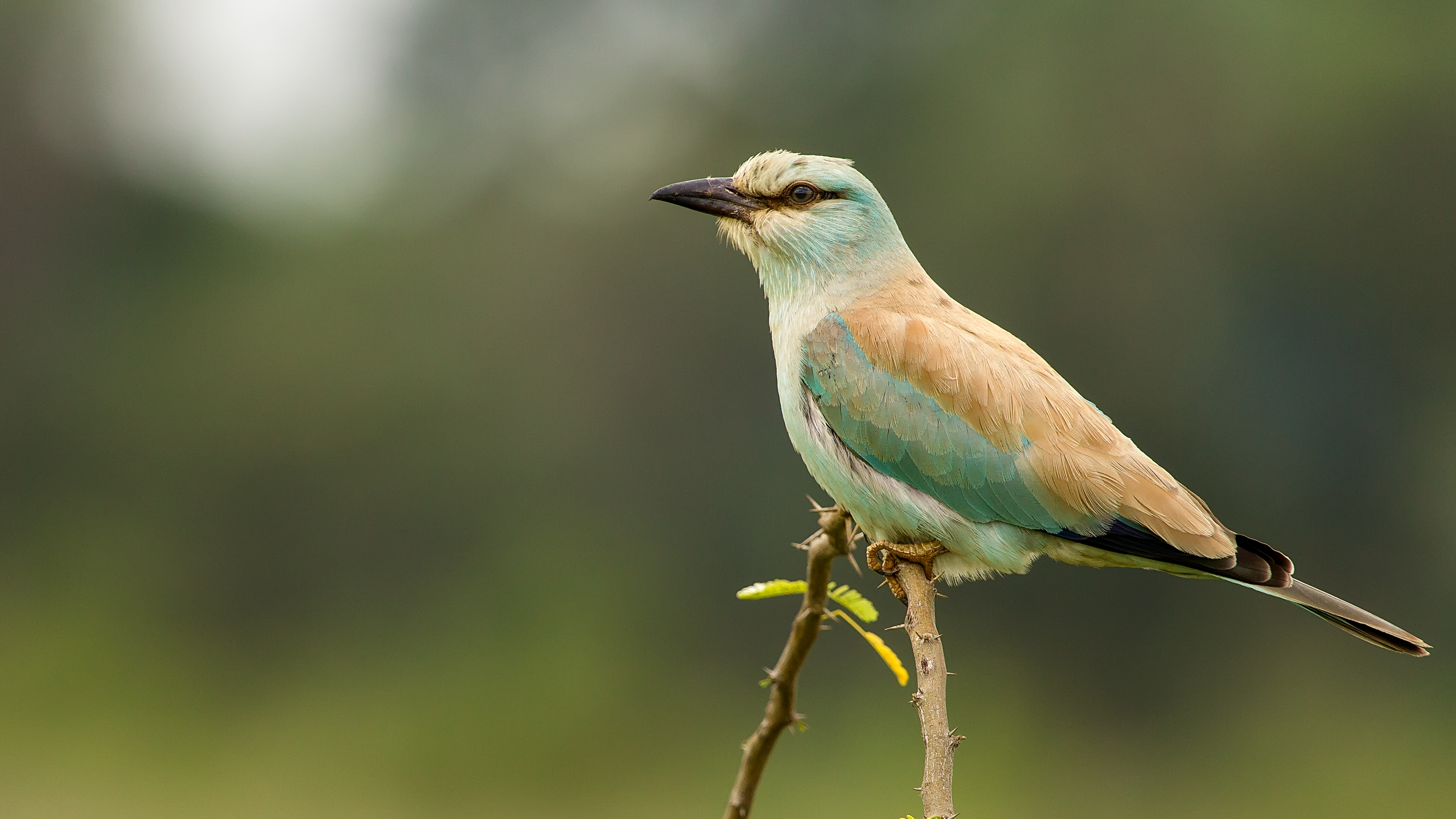
At Hesaraghatta Lake

The European roller is a stocky bird, the size of a Eurasian jay at 29–32 cm (11–13 in) in length with a 52–58 cm (20–23 in) wingspan. It is mainly blue with an orange-brown back. The subspecies C. g. semenowi is slightly paler then the nominate.

The European roller is striking in its strong direct flight, with the brilliant blue contrasting with blue-black ends of the flight feathers. Sexes are similar, but the juvenile is a drabber version of the adult. The European roller is similar in appearance and behaviour to the Abyssinian roller. The aerial-display with the twists and turns give this species its English name. The call is a harsh crow-like sound. It gives a raucous series of calls when alarmed.

== Distribution and habitat ==
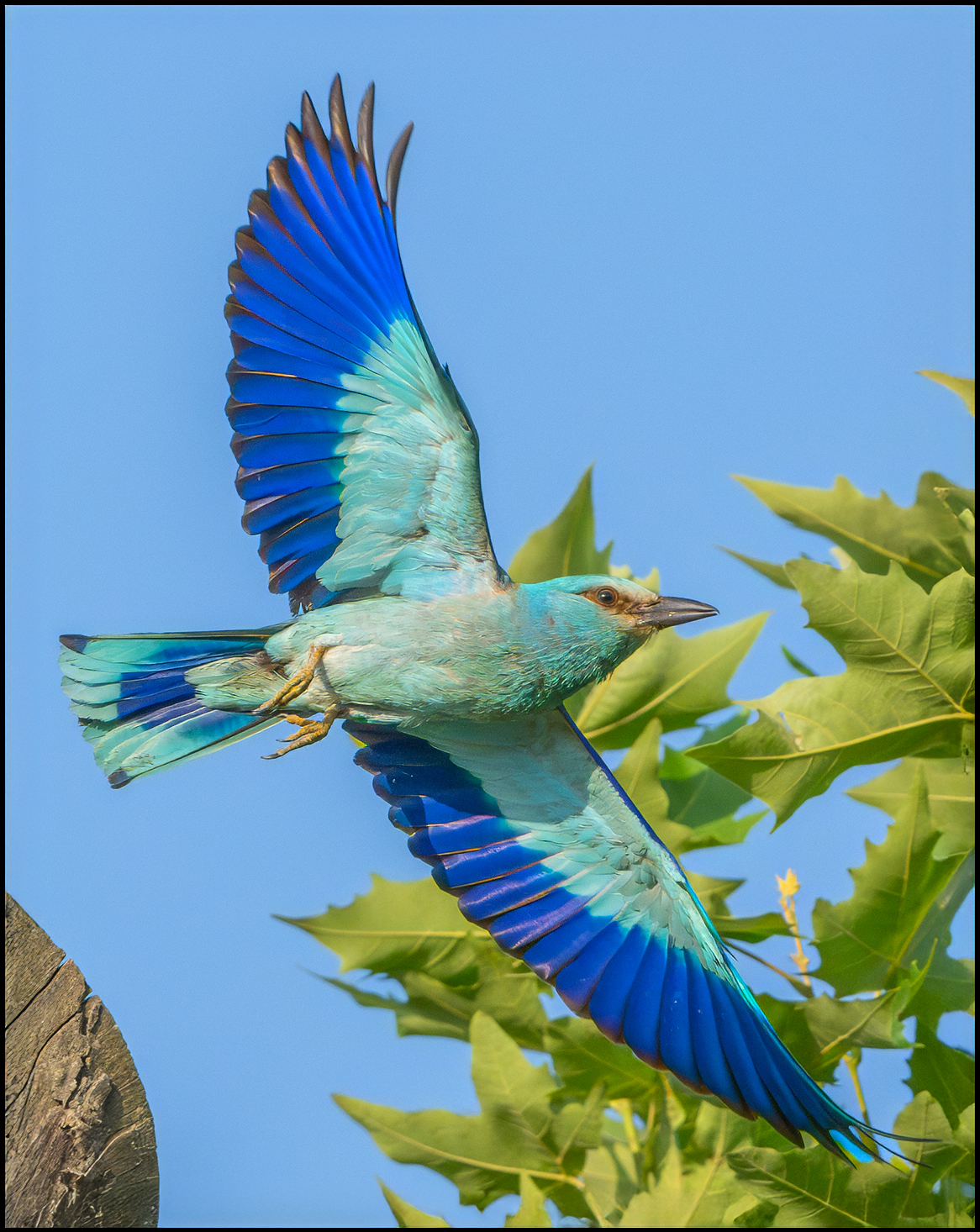
In flight in Padua, Veneto, Italy

The European roller is a bird of warmer regions. The nominate subspecies breeds in northern Africa from Morocco to Tunisia, in southern and east-central Europe, and eastwards through northwestern Iran to southwestern Siberia. The subspecies C. g. semenowi breeds from Iraq and southern Iran east through Kashmir and southern Kazakhstan to Xinjiang. The European range was formerly more extensive, but there has been a long-term decline in the north and west, with extinction as a nesting bird in Sweden and Germany. The European roller is a long-distance migrant, wintering in Africa south of the Sahara in two distinct regions, from Senegal east to Cameroon and from Ethiopia west (with observations in the Degua Tembien mountains) to Congo and south to South Africa. Some populations migrate to Africa through India. A collision with an aircraft over the Arabian Sea has been recorded.

It is a bird of warm, dry, open country with scattered trees, preferring lowlands, but occurs up to 1,000 m (3,300 ft) in Europe and 2,000 m (6,600 ft) in Morocco. Oak and pine woodlands with open areas are prime breeding habitat, but farms, orchards and similar areas with mixed vegetation are also used. In Africa, a similarly wide range of dry, open land with trees is used. It winters primarily in dry, wooded savanna and bushy plains.}

== Migration ==
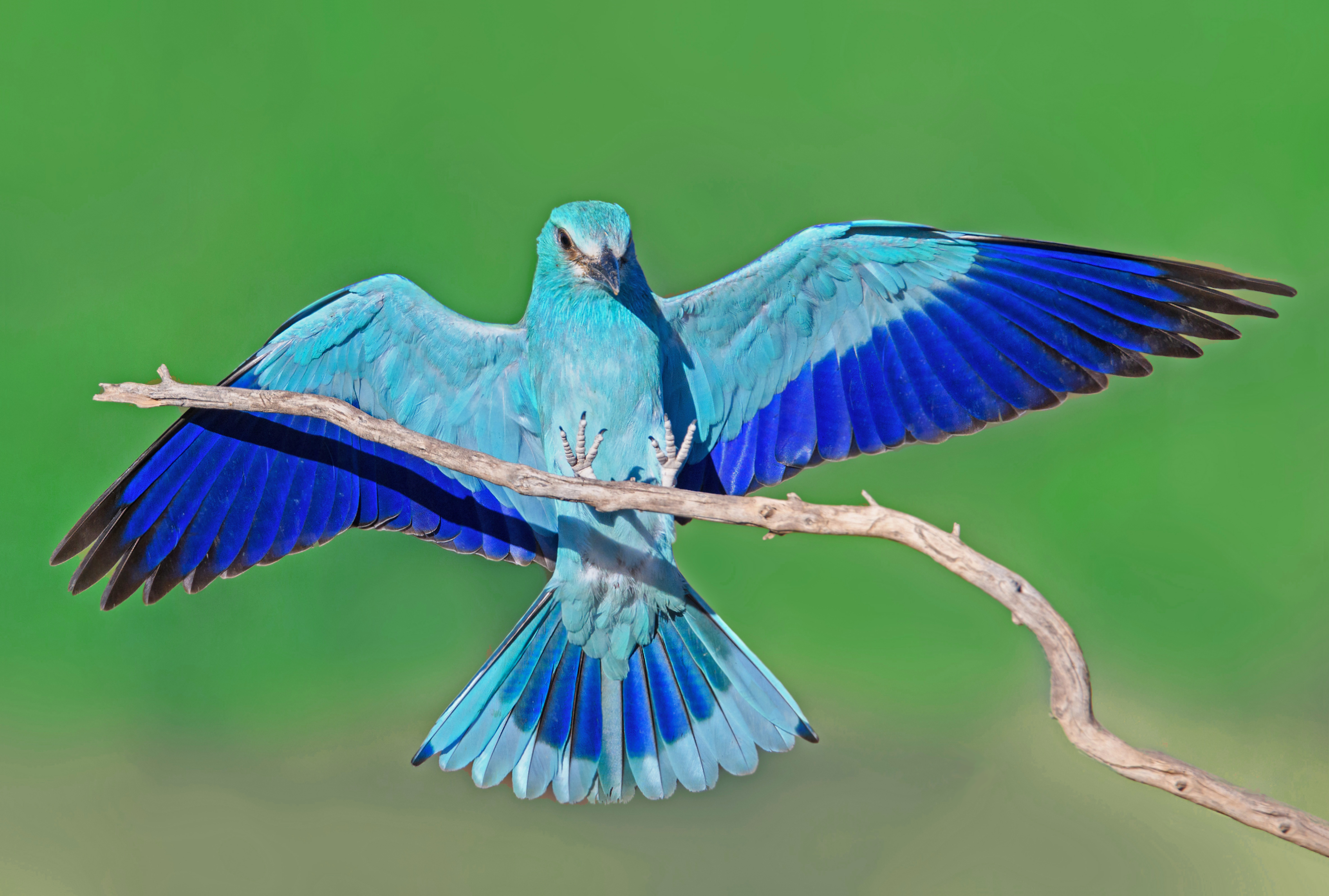
European roller in Sabzevar, Iran

The advent of sufficiently lightweight tracking technology has facilitated several recent studies of roller migration, providing new information on the non-breeding sites used by European rollers from different breeding populations. Individuals from south-west European populations migrate to Angola, Namibia and Botswana; French and north Spanish birds take a direct southerly route across the Sahara, while Portuguese and south Spanish birds take a more westerly route around the west African coast. European rollers from eastern European populations also spend the winter period in southern Africa, but further east in Zambia, Zimbabwe and Botswana. Some population migrate through western India during August to November. The Sahel savannah region immediately south of the Sahara Desert, particularly the area around Lake Chad, appears to be important for European rollers from many populations as an autumn re-fuelling site, and Latvian and other north and north-eastern populations migrate northwards via the Arabian Peninsula in spring. Individuals from different breeding populations use distinct but overlapping winter sites; there is a correlation between the longitude of individual breeding and non-breeding sites, suggesting parallel migration. In the east, the northernmost breeders from Latvia tend to winter south of the southernmost breeders from Cyprus, indicating a pattern of 'leap-frog' migration.

== Behaviour and ecology ==
The European roller chick will vomit a foul-smelling orange liquid onto itself to deter a predator. The smell also warns the parents on their return to the nest.

=== Food and feeding ===
Rollers often perch prominently on trees, posts or overhead wires, like giant shrikes, whilst watching for the large insects, small reptiles, rodents and frogs that they eat. The diet of adult rollers is dominated by beetles, whereas nestlings mostly eat Orthoptera, such as grasshoppers and bush crickets.

=== Breeding ===
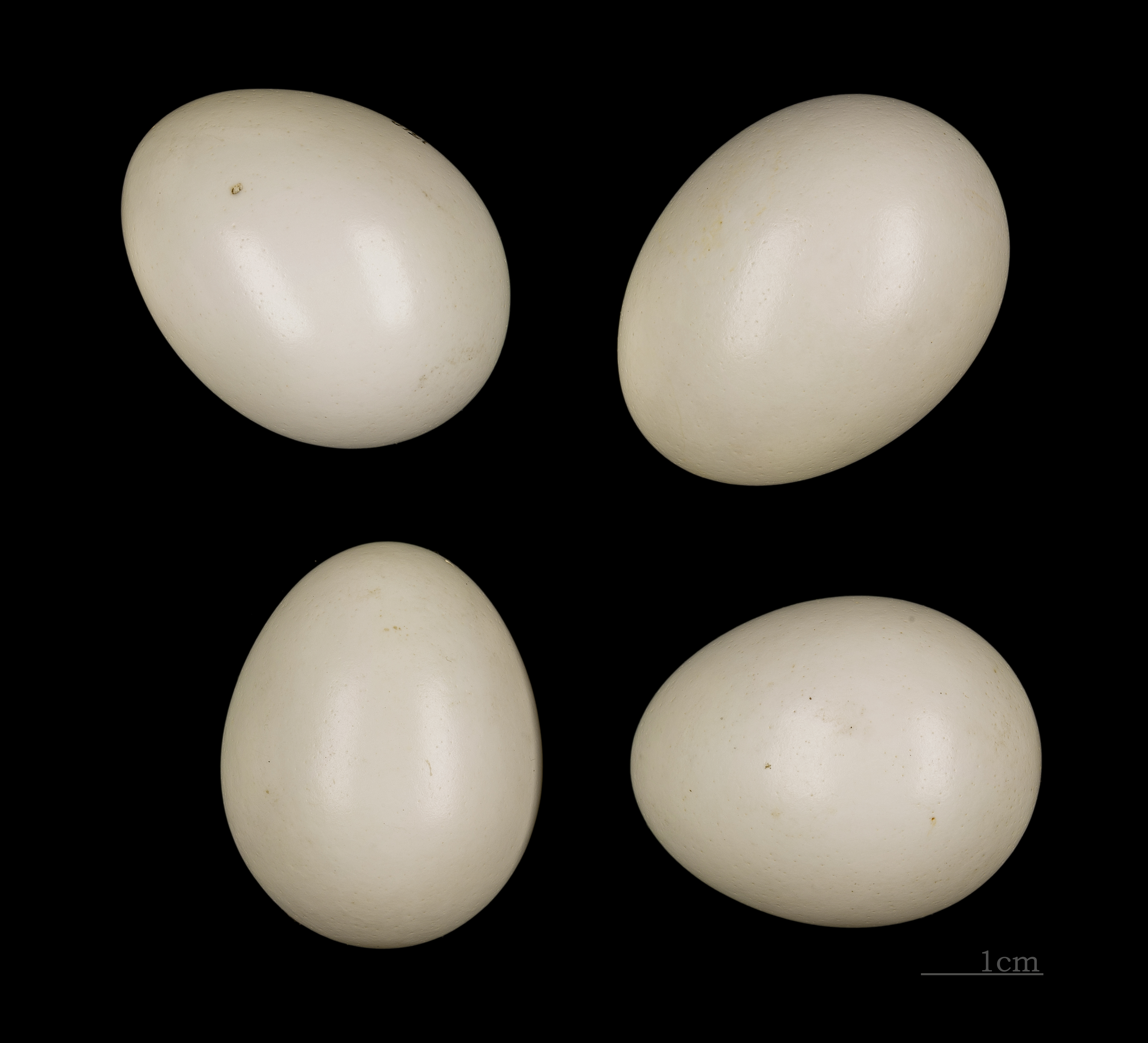
Eggs of Coracias garrulus

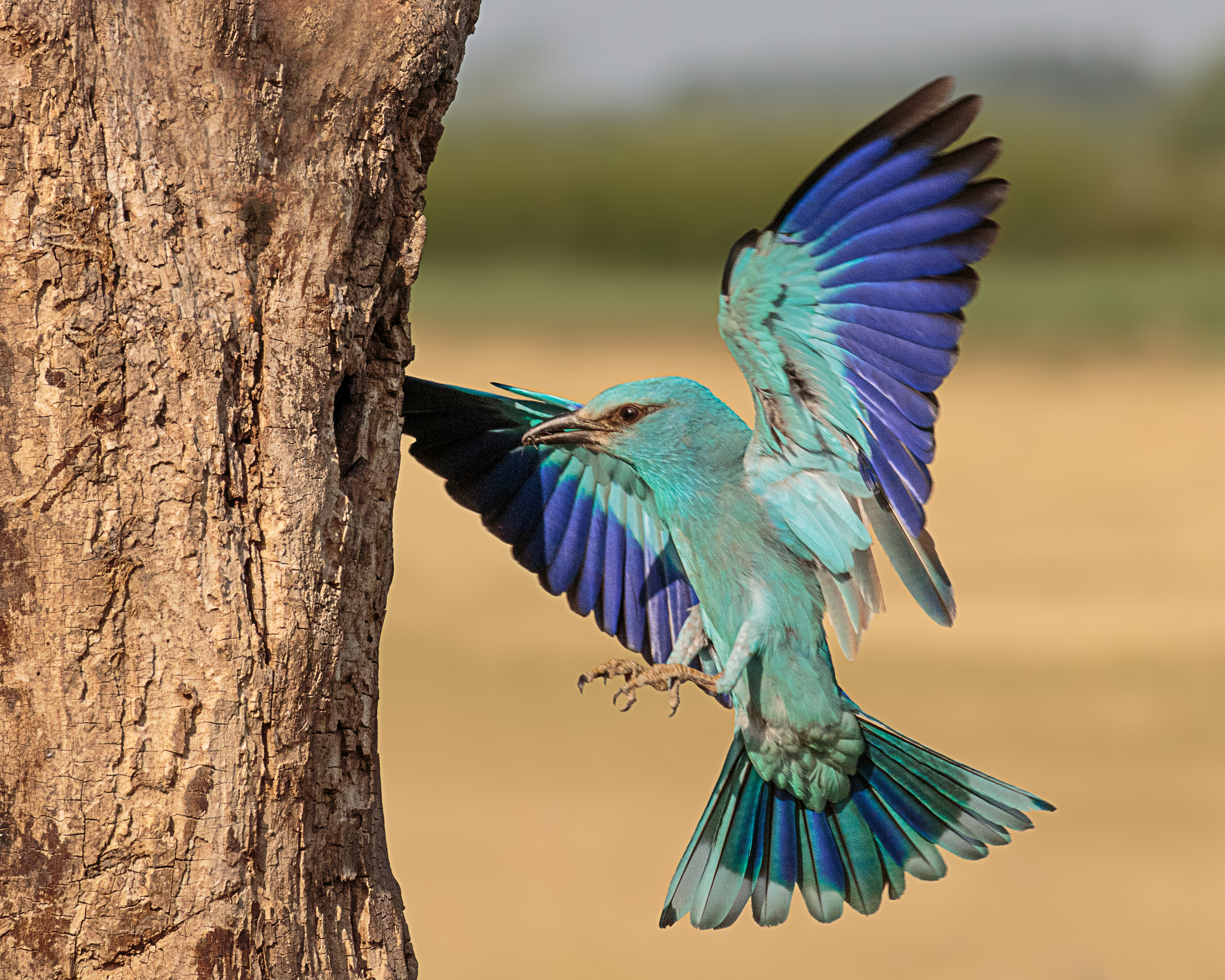
A European roller bringing food to her nest

The nest site is usually in a natural cavity in a tree or in a hole excavated by a woodpecker. It is typically located 5–10 m (16–33 ft) above the ground. Pairs sometimes use a cavity in rocks or buildings and may occasionally excavate a hole in a sandy bank. The hole is unlined. The clutch is 2 to 6 white smooth glossy eggs that measure 35 mm × 28 mm (1.4 in × 1.1 in). They are laid at intervals of two or occasionally three days. They are incubated by both sexes but mainly by the female starting before the clutch is completed. They hatch after 17 to 19 days. The young are cared for by both parents but usually the male passes food to the female. The nestlings fledge after 26 to 27 days. Only a single brood is raised each year, but a replacement clutch is laid if the first is lost. European rollers generally first breed when they are two years old.

The maximum age recorded from ring-recovery data is 9 years and 2 months for a bird shot in Poland.

=== Diseases ===
The European roller is a host of the Acanthocephalan intestinal parasite Moniliformis gracilis.

== Conservation status ==
The Eurasian roller has an extensive distribution in Europe and western Asia, and its European breeding population is estimated at 159,000 to 330,000 birds. When Asian breeders are added, this gives a global total population of 277,000 to 660,000 individuals. There have been fairly rapid population declines across much of its range, so it was formerly classified as near threatened by the International Union for Conservation of Nature in 2005; it has, however, been downlisted to least concern in 2015, as population development was judged to not meet the criteria for a more urgent rating at this time. The European population declined by 25% between 1990 and 2000. The northern areas of the breeding range have fared worst, with numbers in the Baltic states and northern Russia collapsing, and no birds left breeding in Estonia.

Threats include hunting while on migration around the Mediterranean, and large numbers, possibly in the thousands, are killed for food in Oman. Agricultural practices have led to the loss of trees and hedges which provide potential nest sites and perches for hunting, and pesticides have reduced the availability of insect food. At locations where foraging resources are abundant, providing nest boxes can be a useful short-term conservation solution; however, in other locations foraging habitat restoration is more important.

== In culture ==
The Steinhardt Museum of Natural History commissioned a musical project of educational songs about animals, composed and performed by Shachar Even Tzur, called "Agada Chaya" (אגדה חיה, Living Legend). One of the songs was written about the European Roller (Kahal כחל in Hebrew).

The Israel Police Airbus Helicopters H125 helicopter is called "Kahal" (the Hebrew name for European Roller).

== Cited texts ==
- Cramp, Stanley, ed. (1985). "Coracias garrulus Roller". Handbook of the Birds of Europe the Middle East and North Africa. The Birds of the Western Palearctic. Vol. IV: Terns to Woodpeckers. Oxford: Oxford University Press. pp. 764–776. ISBN 978-0-19-857507-8.
