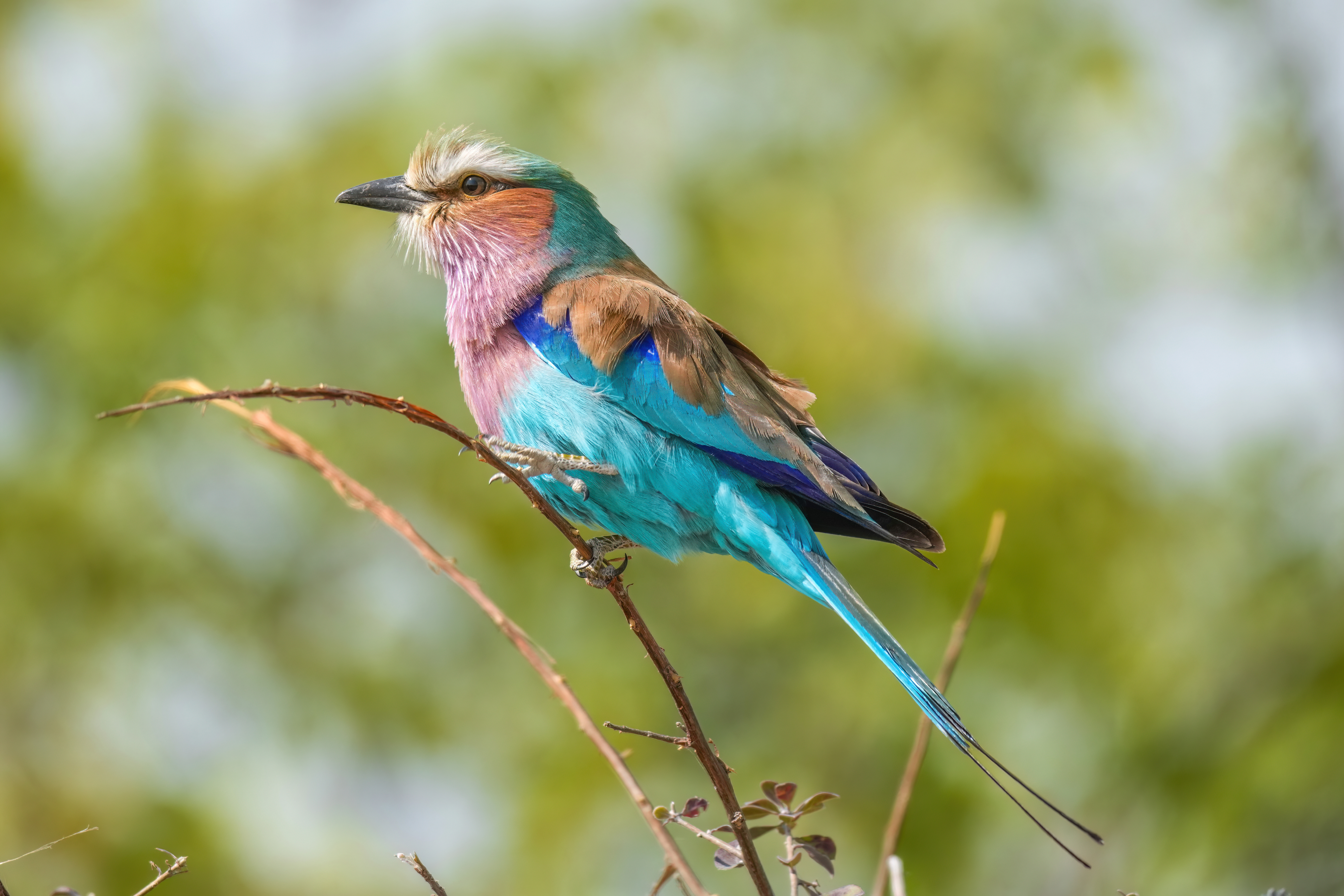
- Etosha National Park, Namibia

Conservation status
- Least Concern (IUCN 3.1)

Scientific classification
- Kingdom: Animalia
- Phylum: Chordata
- Class: Aves
- Order: Coraciiformes
- Family: Coraciidae
- Genus: Coracias
- Species: C. caudatus

Binomial name
- Coracias caudatus Linnaeus, 1766
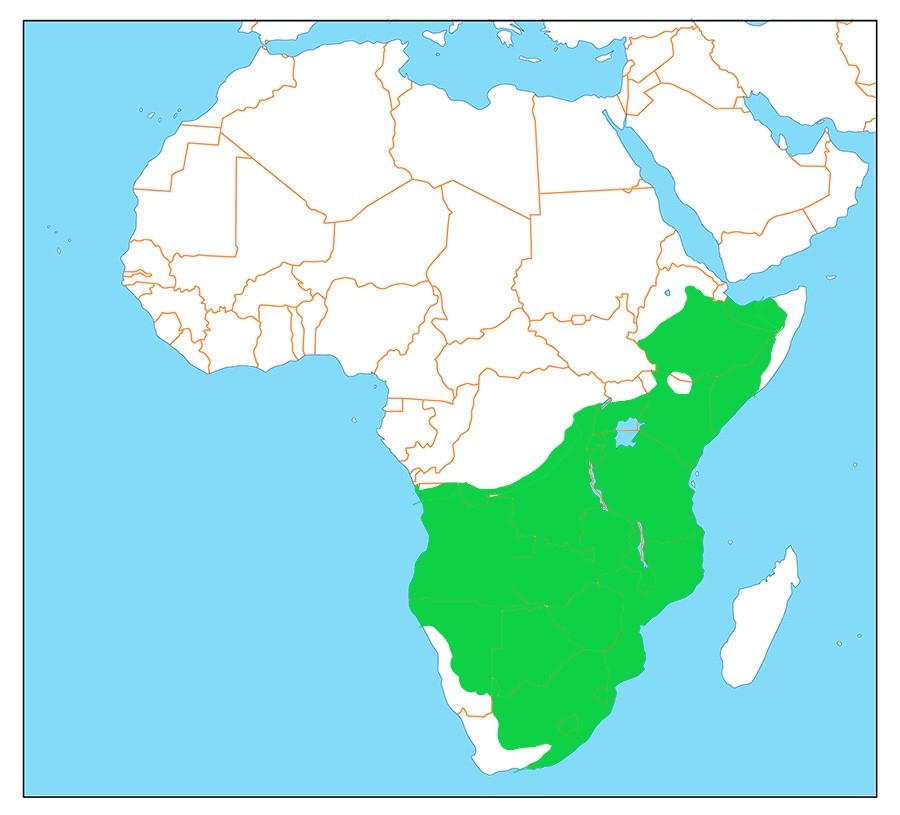
- resident range

Synonyms
- Coracias caudata Linnaeus, 1766 (lapsus)

Audio
- Recording of a bird calling in flight

= Lilac-breasted roller =

Species of bird

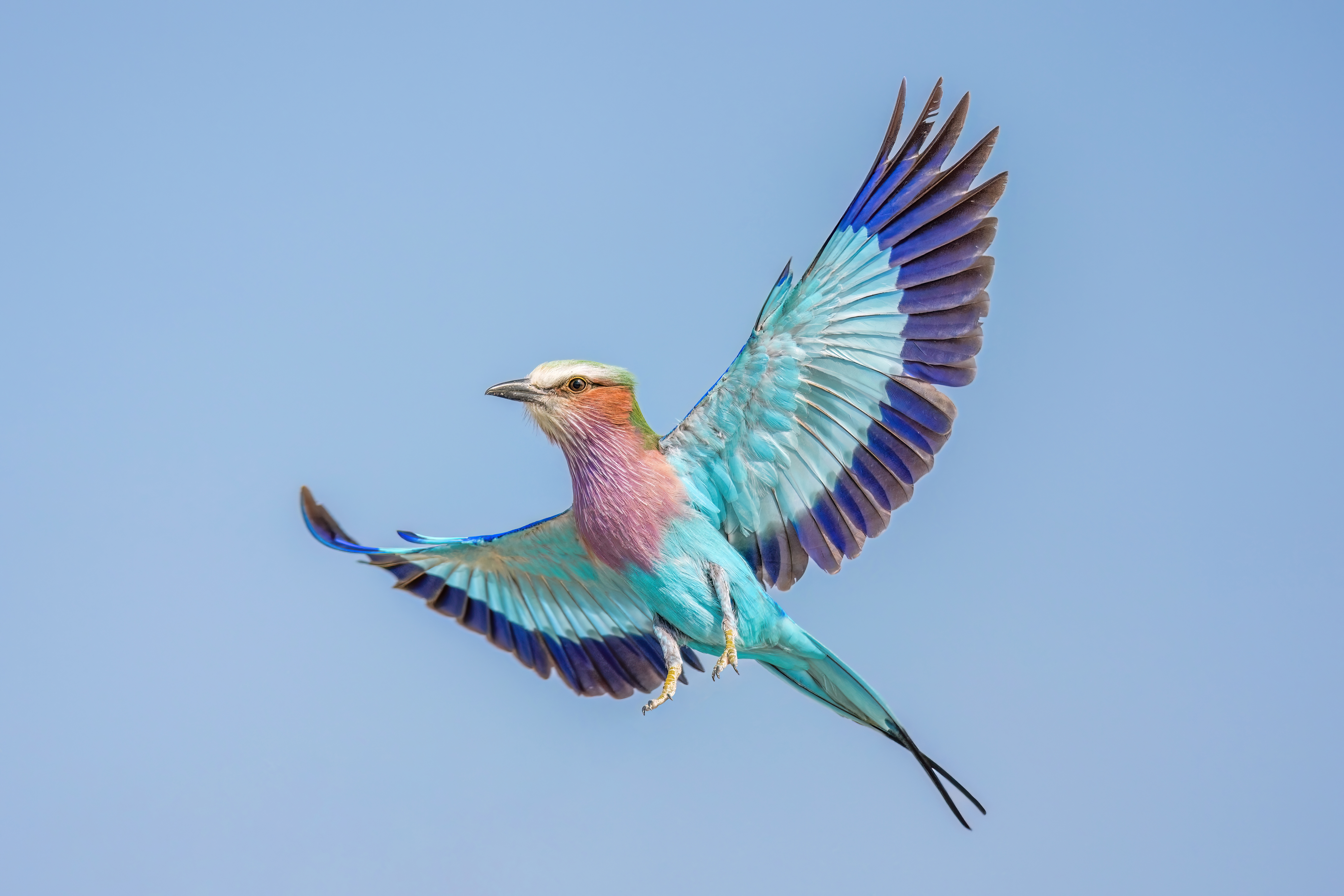
Lilac-breasted roller in flight in Etosha National Park, Namibia

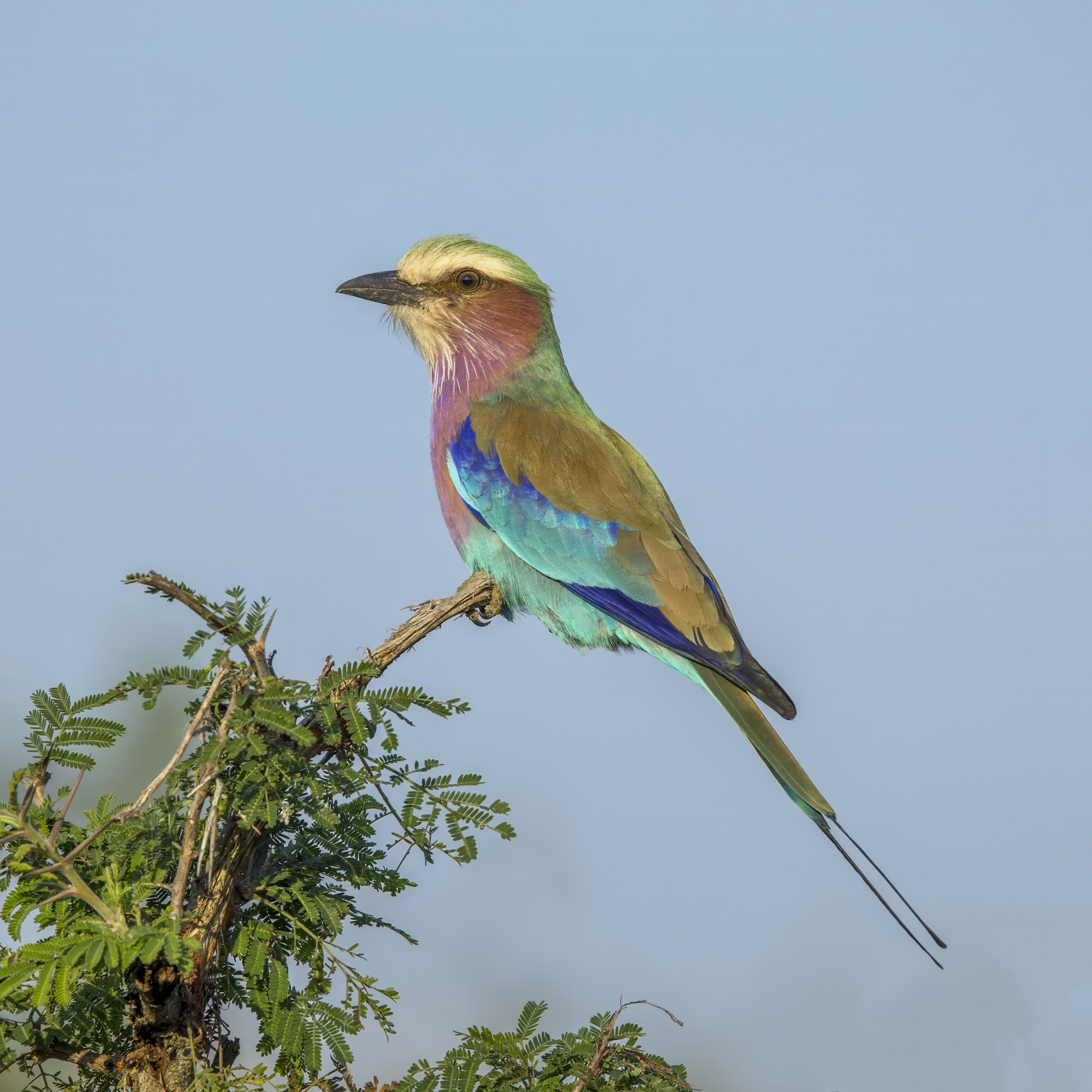
Lilac-breaster roller in Kruger National Park, South Africa

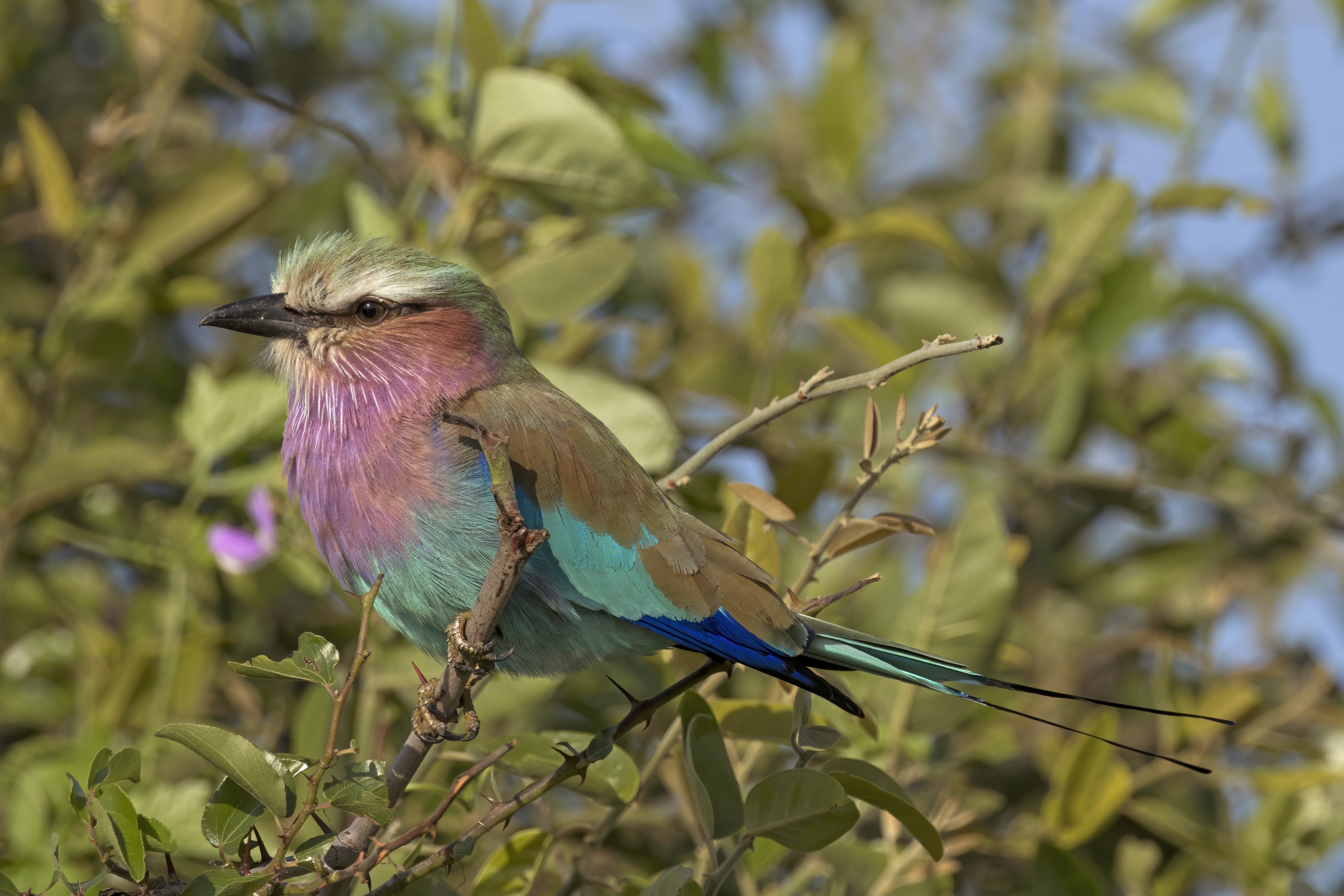
Adult bird perched in Chobe National Park, Botswana

The lilac-breasted roller (Coracias caudatus) is an African bird of the roller family, Coraciidae. It is widely distributed in Southern and Eastern Africa, and is a vagrant to the southern Arabian Peninsula. It prefers open woodland and savanna, and it is for the most part absent from treeless places. Usually found alone or in pairs, it perches at the tops of trees, poles or other high vantage points from where it can spot insects, amphibians and small birds moving about on the ground. Nesting takes place in a natural hole in a tree where a clutch of 2–4 eggs are laid, and incubated by both parents, who are extremely aggressive in defence of their nest, taking on raptors and other birds. During the breeding season the male will rise to a fair height (69 to 144 metres), descending in swoops and dives, while uttering harsh, discordant cries. The sexes do not differ in coloration, and juveniles lack the long tail streamers of adults. This species is unofficially considered the national bird of Kenya. Alternative names for the lilac-breasted roller include the fork-tailed roller, lilac-throated roller (also used for a subspecies of purple roller), Mosilikatze's roller, and troupand.

== Taxonomy and systematics ==
The lilac-breasted roller was formally described by the Swedish naturalist Carl Linnaeus in 1766 in the twelfth edition of his Systema Naturae under the binomial name Coracias caudata. Linnaeus based his description on "Le Rollier d'Angola" that had been described and illustrated in 1760 by the French zoologist Mathurin Jacques Brisson. The specific epithet caudatus is Latin meaning "tailed".

The lilac-breasted roller is one of nine species in genus Coracias, a group native to the open woodlands of western Eurasia and Africa.

The phylogenetic relationships among the Coracias species are shown below, from the molecular study by Johansson et al. (2018)

- Coracias
  - Blue-bellied roller – C. cyanogaster
  - - - Purple roller – C. naevius
      - Racket-tailed roller – C. spatulatus
    - - - Indian roller – C. benghalensis
        - - Indochinese roller – C. affinis
          - Purple-winged roller – C. temminckii
      - - Lilac-breasted roller – C. caudatus
        - - Abyssinian roller – C. abyssinicus
          - European roller – C. garrulus

Two subspecies are recognized:

- C. c. caudatus Linnaeus, 1766, the "lilac-breasted roller", is found from central Kenya to northern South Africa, and westwards to the Atlantic coasts of Namibia and Angola
- C. c. lorti Shelley, 1885, the "lilac-throated roller" or "blue-breasted roller" was originally described as a separate species, and is found from Eritrea to western Somalia and northeastern Kenya

Though not parapatric (their breeding ranges do not meet) there is no evidence of behavioural or ecological differences that would support C. c. lorti as a separate species.

== Description ==
In the field, these robust, large-headed birds are often perched alone on a tree in a grassy clearing, and are almost unmistakable with their colourful plumage tones. The lilac throat of the nominate subspecies C. c. caudatus deepens into a darker lilac breast. The crown to mantle is olive, and the cheeks and ear coverts a lilac-rufous. In subspecies C. c. lorti however, the crown to mantle is greenish blue instead of olive, and the breast azure. The throat is lilac, and some lilac-throated rollers have a lilac patch or rufous-brown tinges on the lower abdomen. Both subspecies have long, black outermost tail streamers that are absent in juveniles. Lilac-breasted rollers are not sexually dimorphic though males may be slightly larger than females. Juveniles, immatures and adults have the largest alula feather dark blue, but the primary coverts and rest of the alula azure. The proximal half of the remiges are also a brilliant azure, and the distal half black on the inner web, and dark purple blue on the outer webs. Juveniles have the throat and breast rufous-tawny with broad diffuse buffy-white streaks with mauve margins on some feathers. Immatures have the breast buffy with occasional lilac feathers and diffuse pale streaking.

The average mass is 104 grams, and length ranges from 36 to 38 centimeters (inclusive of the tail streamer of 8 to 9 cm). These acrobatic fliers have an average wingspan range of 50 to 58 cm. Unique to rollers (family Coraciidae) are syndactyl feet, in which the second and third digits are fused.

They may be confused with the sleeker Abyssinian roller in the Turkana Basin of Kenya, which however has dark blue upper tail coverts, an azure breast and distinctly spatulate tail streamers. Besides spatulate tail streamers, pinkish-breasted racket-tailed rollers have darker greater regime coverts and darker blue primary coverts.

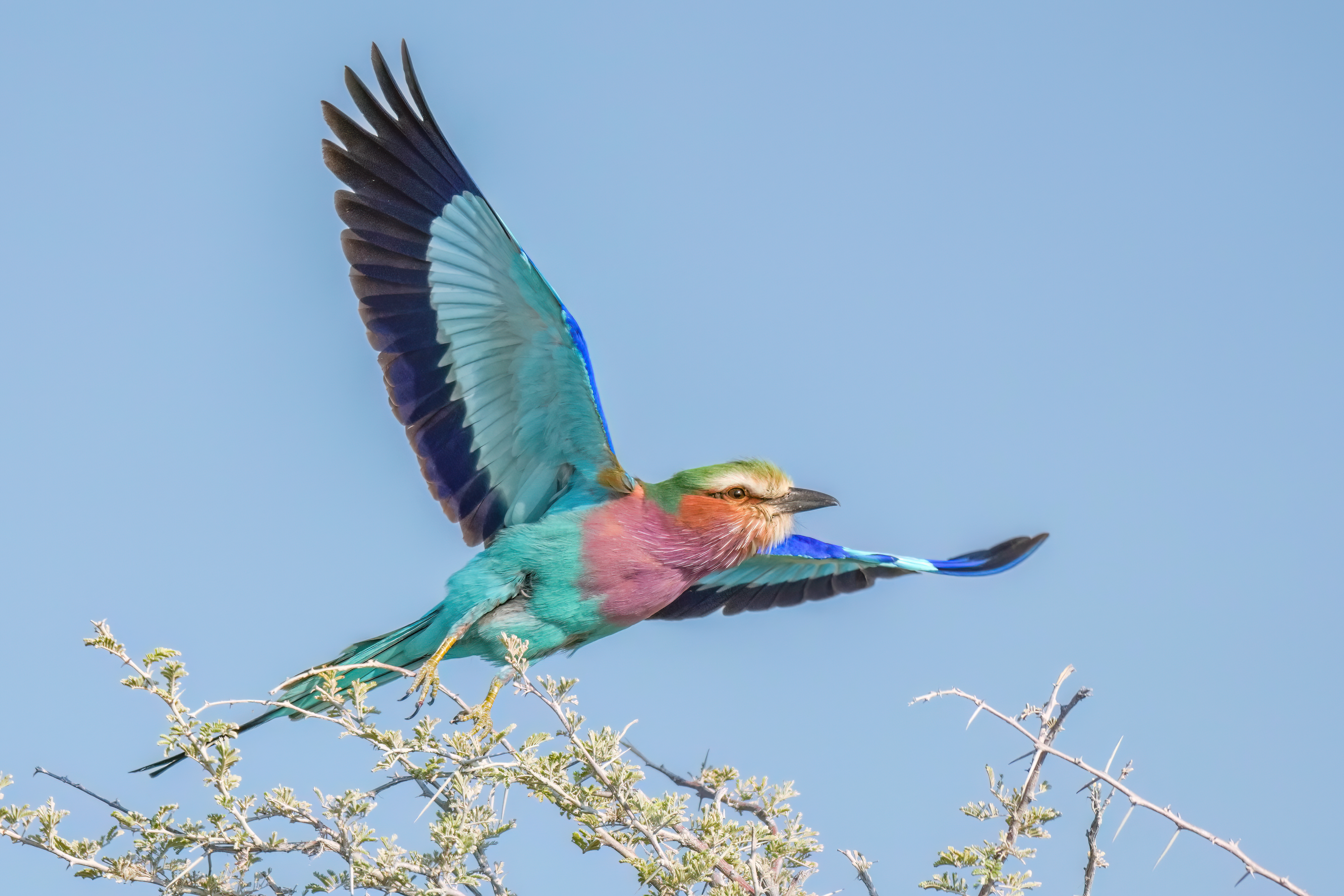
Taking off showing wing underside in Etosha National Park, Namibia

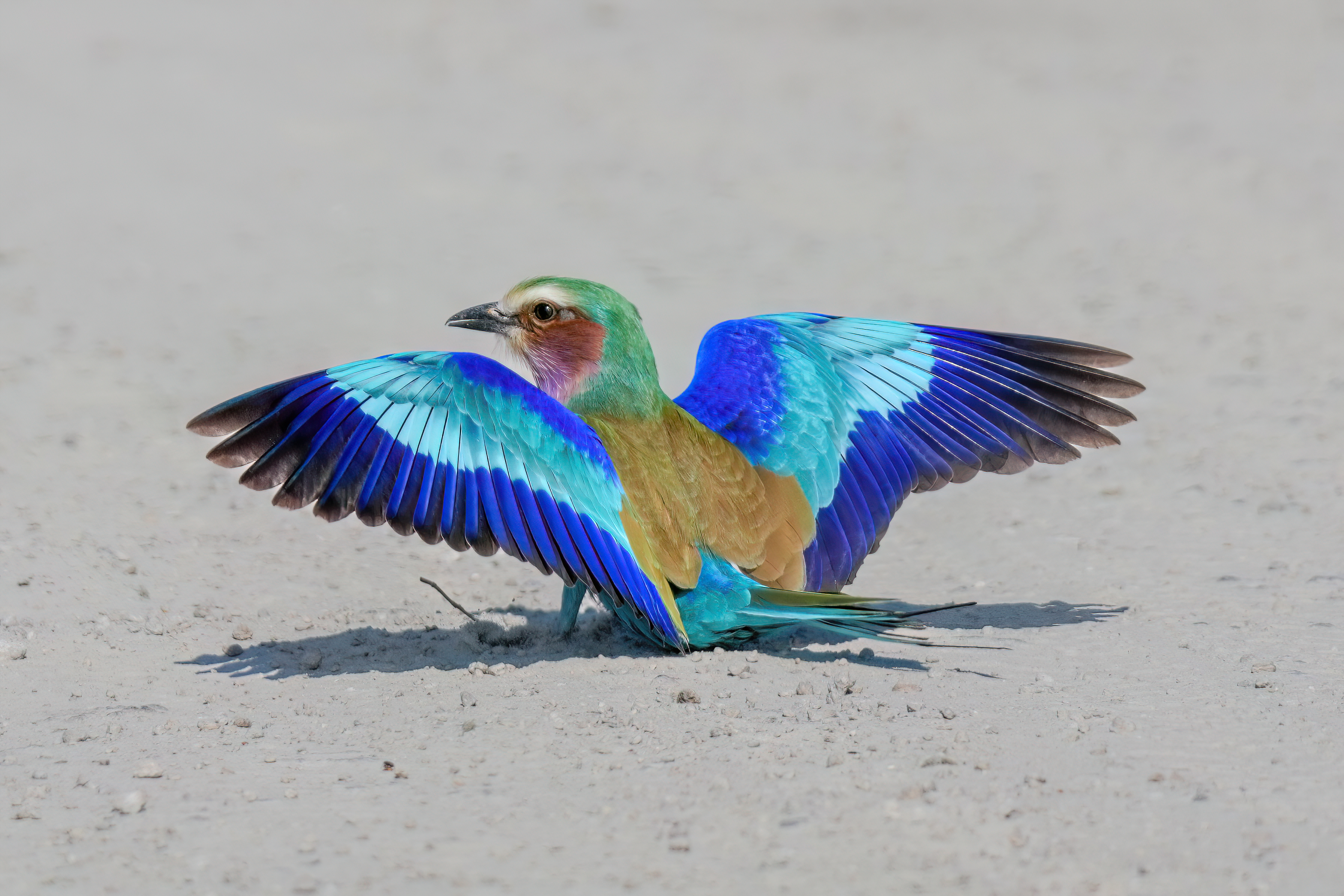
Landing showing wing upperside in Etosha National Park, Namibia

=== Vocalizations ===
The call of a lilac-breasted roller is a harsh, sawing "rak rak rak" that is given during flight. Usually, the bird will perch to sing.

== Distribution and habitat ==
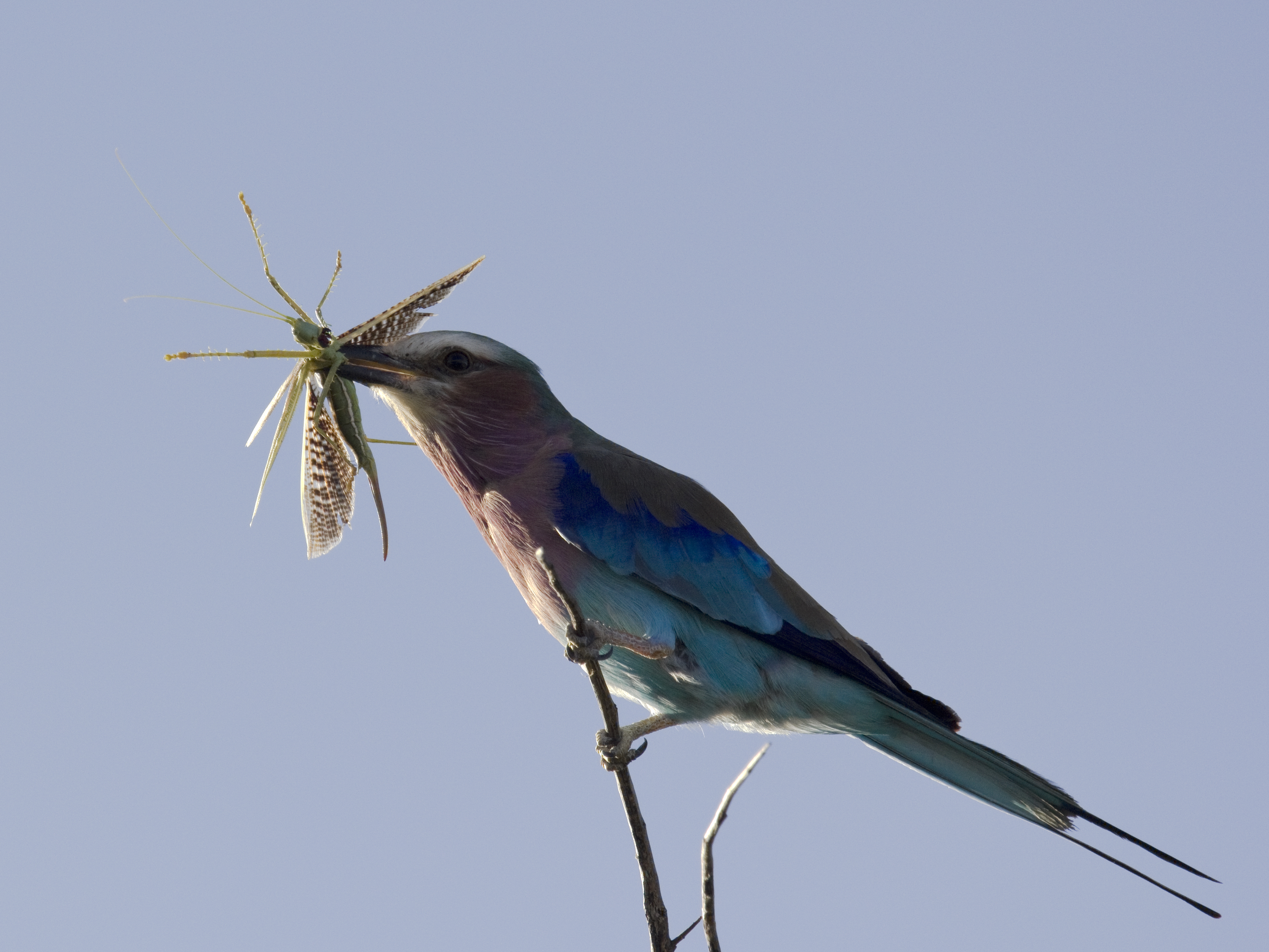
With orthopteran prey in Etosha National Park, Namibia

Lilac-breasted rollers are found throughout eastern and southern Africa, and occurs locally at sea level, and up to 2,000 metres above sea level or over. Their range extends from the Red Sea coast of Eritrea through East Africa (including Zanzibar) to southern Africa, where they occur commonly in Namibia (excluding the Namib Desert), Botswana, Zimbabwe, and northeastern South Africa. The nominate subspecies C. c. caudatus is non-migratory, but a measure of post-breeding dispersal occurs into miombo woodland or sandy areas, before they return to the breeding areas at the start of the rains. Its counterpart, the lilac-throated roller (C. c. lorti) migrates from northeast Kenya to northwest Somalia to breed from late April to mid-September. The latter subspecies is also a vagrant to Eritrea, Oman and Yemen. Lilac-breasted rollers are most abundant in Kenya, though the species is less abundant than in former times.

Both subspecies live in open savannah habitats with scattered trees and shrubs, as the birds require higher perches for feeding and nesting. Less often they frequent riverine vegetation and light forest, and may enter subdesert steppe or open grassland where any elevated perches may be used. In protected areas, lilac-breasted rollers are among the bird species that frequent the verges of roads, especially during fires, when the small animals and insects that emerge from cover are easily predated. However, lilac-breasted rollers avoid other human-influenced areas and are not found in urban or rural areas unless they are abandoned. Outside of protected areas such as national parks, lilac-breasted rollers may infrequently be seen when farmers burn land for agricultural use. Such brush fires stir up insects and other invertebrates, and birds can be seen swooping in for easy prey.

== Behaviour and ecology ==
=== Breeding ===
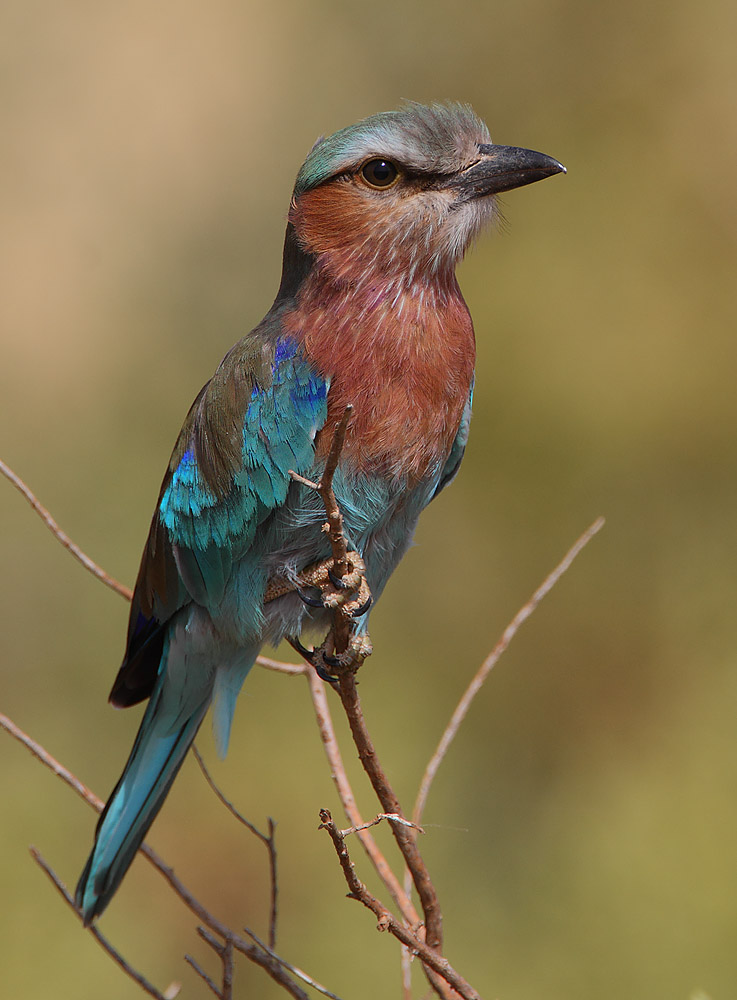
Juvenile bird at Samburu National Reserve in central Kenya – it has rufous-tawny chest plumage, and its outer rectrices lack the streamers of adult plumage.

Both subspecies are probably monogamous and nest solitary. The sexes are not readily distinguishable, and their displays have not been definitively linked to either male or female. Pairs are protective of their nest and one of the pair will fly in a rolling pattern as a territorial display against intruders or to detract nest predators. During courtship, a lilac-breasted roller will fly upwards and then tip forward with the wings closed, before flapping to gain speed towards the ground. While leveling out at highest speed the bird will roll to the left and right a few times, uttering a harsh, raucous "kaaa, kaarsh", before swooping up again. The display may end with a harsh chuckling. If a second male enters a territory, he is presumed to be a rival and is chased out, or the two males fight another by thrusting, beating each other's wings, and clawing one another while flying upwards.

Lilac-throated rollers breed from late April to mid-September in Somalia, while lilac-breasted rollers breed at various times of the year, depending on the location. They build flat nests of grass in a baobab, dead coconut, casuarina or Terminalia tree. The nest is situated in a hollowed out tree cavity some 5 meters (16 ft) off the ground, or even in the side of a termite mound. Lilac-breasted rollers do not create the cavities themselves, but take over nest spaces that have been previously hollowed out by woodpeckers or kingfishers.

Typically, lilac-breasted rollers in Somalia will lay three to four eggs per breeding season. In southern Africa, the average clutch size ranges from two to four eggs. Male and female partners will take turns incubating the eggs for 22 to 24 days. Hatchlings are born altricial, becoming fully feathered after 19 days.

=== Feeding ===
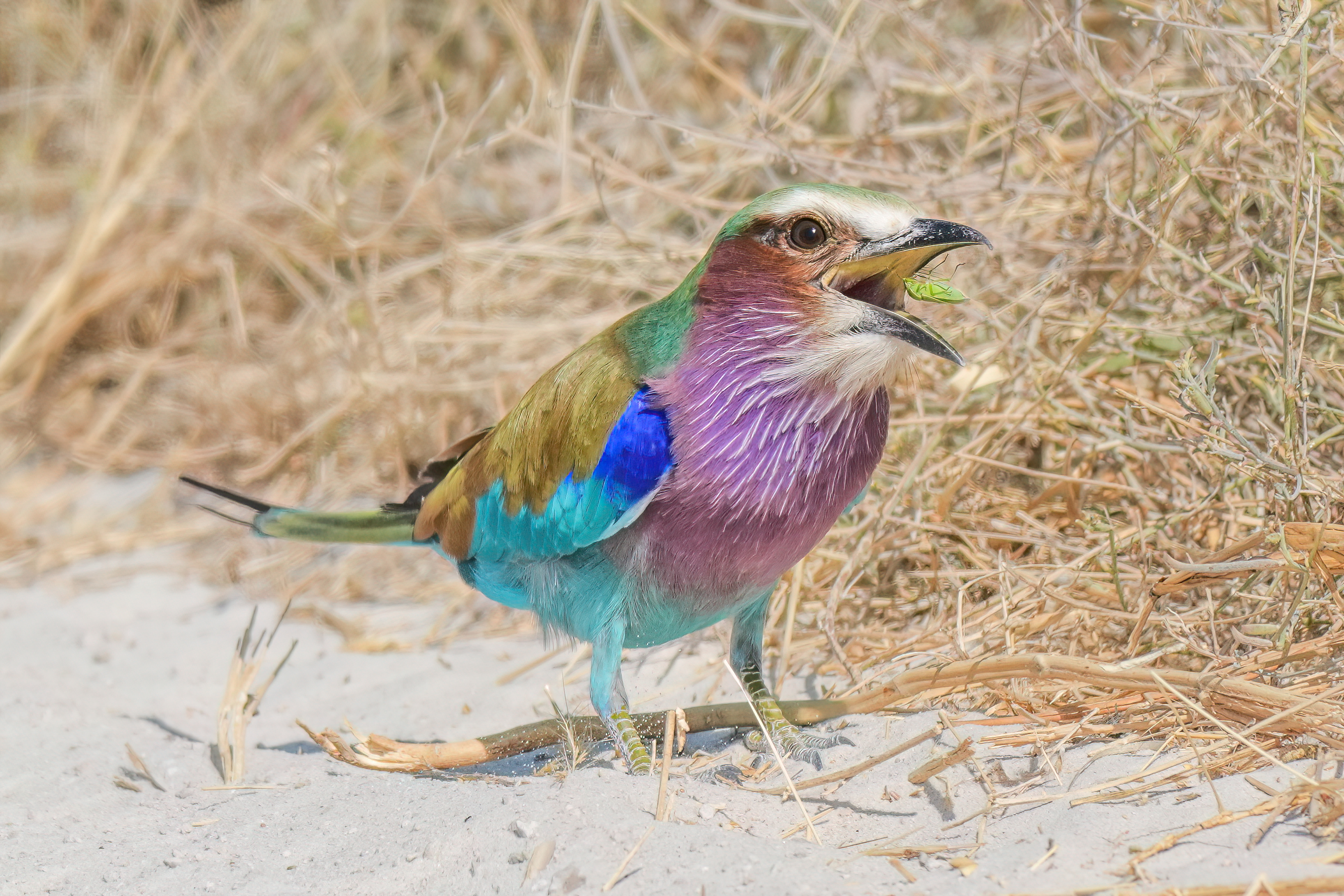
Lilac-breaster roller eating in Etosha National Park, Namibia

The diet of the lilac-breasted roller consists of arthropods and small vertebrates, including ground-dwelling insects, spiders, scorpions, centipedes and millipedes, snails, and a variety of small vertebrates, including small birds. Slow-moving lizards, chameleons and snakes, and the blind, burrowing Afrotyphlops and Leptotyphlops species are especially vulnerable to them when crossing roads. In East Africa, they join other perch hunters like Taita fiscals and pale flycatchers to make opportunistic use of grassland fires, and in South Africa are likewise seen in association with kites, storks, swallows and bee-eaters when burning of firebreaks drives small animals unto roads.

Because they feed mainly on terrestrial prey, lilac-breasted rollers will perch to scout from a higher vantage point (including from atop of large herbivorous mammals) before swooping in and grabbing prey with their beaks. If their prey is small, they will swallow it on the ground. These aggressive birds will carry larger prey back to a perch and beat it until it is dismembered.

== Status ==
According to the International Union for Conservation of Nature and Natural Resources (IUCN), the lilac-breasted roller is of least concern. The large range and stable population size contribute to this assessment.
