= Dhodial Pheasantry =

- تِیتَر خانہ ڈھوڈیل
- Interactive map of Dhodial Pheasantry
- 34°25′14″N 73°15′13″E
- Date opened: 1984
- Location: Dhodial, Mansehra District, Khyber Pakhtunkhwa, Pakistan
- Land area: 8.5 ha
- No. of animals: >4,000
- No. of species: 38 (pheasants only)
- Annual visitors: 180,000
- Major exhibits: ~250
- Website: dhodialpheasantry.com

Dhodial Pheasantry (or Dhodial Pheasant Center) is a pheasantry and breeding center for several species of pheasants situated in Mansehra District, Pakistan. It has been set up for the purposes of research, conservation, tourism, and education. The pheasantry has around 250 exhibits providing shelter to around 4,000 birds.

== Location ==
Dhodial Pheasantry is located on Karakorum Highway in the village of Dhodial, Mansehra District, Khyber Pakhtunkhwa, Pakistan, 40 kilometres (25 mi) from Abbottabad, towards the village of Shinkiari. It covers an area of 8.5 hectares (21 acres). The Dhodial campus of Hazara University is located near the facility.

== History ==
Dhodial Pheasantry was established in 1984 by the Khyber Pakhtunkhwa Wildlife Department with the support of the IUCN and the World Pheasant Association. It was initially set up over an area of 4 acres (1.6 ha).

In 2001, when Hazara University planned to expand its campus over 204 acres (83 ha), then Governor of Khyber Pakhtunkhwa Lt. Gen Iftikhar Hussain Shah ordered the pheasantry to be relocated to the Jaba Sheep Farm. The Inevitable Flight, a documentary film about this issue, was made by a Pakistani Canadian documentary filmmaker, Azfar Rizvi. This brought the issue under public scrutiny. Subsequently, other factors kicked in and mobilized enough public and political support that the relocation was cancelled.

== Public services ==
An information center has been developed in the aviary to accommodate visitors, facilitate researchers, and spread awareness among local pheasant breeders. More than 500 people visit the aviary daily. The entry fee for the aviary is 10 Pakistani rupees per person.

In 2011, the aviary was closed to the public due to the supposed spread of bird flu. By July, all of the birds had been vaccinated and the aviary was opened to the public again on July 5, 2011.

== Conservation efforts ==
The cheer pheasant, which became extinct in Pakistan, was reintroduced in the region. The World Pheasants Association sent 90 eggs of the species to the Dhodial Pheasantry. Among the eggs which hatched, the mortality was high and remained high till 1995. This situation got better in 1996. In 1997, a parent flock of 40 pairs was raised and eventually reintroduction of the cheer pheasant in Hazara District was carried out. As of 2007, there are around 60 pairs of cheer pheasant in the Dhodial Pheasantry.

== Species ==
=== Birds ===
==== Pheasants ====
Dhodial Pheasantry holds captive 38 of the 52 species of pheasants found in the world. Some of these include:

- Bar-tailed pheasant
- Blue eared pheasant
- Brown eared pheasant
- Cheer pheasant
- Common pheasant
- Elliot's pheasant
- Edwards's pheasant
- Golden pheasant
- Green peafowl
- Grey francolin
- Himalayan monal
- Indian peafowl
- Kalij pheasant
- Koklass pheasant
- Lady Amherst's pheasant
- Reeves's pheasant
- Satyr tragopan
- Siamese fireback
- Silver pheasant
- Swinhoe's pheasant
- Western tragopan
- White eared pheasant

=== Other ===
Cranes

- Demoiselle crane

Waterfowls

- Bar-headed goose
- Gadwall
- Mallard
- Northern pintail
- Poachard
- Tufted duck

=== Mammals ===
The facility also houses some species of mammals:

- Bengal tiger
- Chinkara
- Leopard
- Urial

== See also ==
- The Inevitable Flight
