= Dhodial =

Coordinates: 34°26′N 73°16′E

Dhodial Upper Pakhli
- Union council and town
- Dhodial
- Interactive map of Dhodial
- Country: Pakistan
- Province: Khyber-Pakhtunkhwa
- District: Mansehra District
- Region: Upper Pakhli
- Founder: Swati Families (1703) • 1) Arghushal Swatis • 2) Malkal Swatis

Government
  - Chairman VC Arghushal: Zakir Hussain Khan Arghushal Swati
  - Chairman VC Malkal: Rizwan Ul Haq Khan Malkal Swati
- Time zone: UTC+5 (PST)

Dhodial (also known as Dhudial) is an important town and union council located near Baffa between Mansehra and Shinkiari in Mansehra District in Khyber Pakhtunkhwa province of Pakistan. Dhodial is a fertile region known for its vegetables and tobacco crop. Dhodial is also well known for its pheasant conservation project. The town was badly affected by the 2005 Pakistan earthquake.

== Location ==
Dhodial is north of Mansehra in Hazara area at an altitude of 3,267 feet. The river Siren flows alongside the town.

== Health care ==
This area is known for the treatment of mentally ill patients. Khan Khudadad Khan Swati established a National Psychiatric Health unit, called the "Government Mental & General Hospital" in Dhodial in the early 1960s. Its purpose was to treat patients with mental illness and to function as a general hospital. It had facilities for the treatment of mentally disabled patients, including physical and mental grooming. Mohammad Irfan was the initial medical superintendent and consultant psychiatrist. The government's other plans included the SOS Children's Villages and National Peasantry. This hospital became tuberculosis sanitorium Dadar when in 2002 Hazara University was formed in it.

== Education ==
The University of Hazara is situated in Dhodial and provides education to students throughout Mansehra District and the Hazara Region. Abdul Hanan Khan Malkal Swati of VC Malkal donated land for mental hospital which later converted into Hazara University.

== Politics ==
The prominent political group is the Pakistan tehreek insaf which was led by Imran Khan. The Swatis that are in the majority are also politically strong and influential. As people are getting educated, political situation is improving and parties like PTI are emerging. Other political parties are the PML N Jamiat Ullamay e Islam, Jammat Islami Pakistan. Dhodial has three village councils: Village Council Malkal, Village Council Arghoshal and Girwal. Zakir Hussain Khan Arghushal Swati is the elected Chairman of VC Arghushal while Rizwan Ul Haq Khan Malkal Swati is the Chairman of VC Malkal. VC Girwal was merged into UC Dhodial after the creation of Pakistan as it was a separate area before.

== Conservation ==
The people of Dhodial practice conservation and captive breeding of various species of pheasants. Dhodial Pheasantry, Asia's largest peasantry, is located near the village.

== People ==
Dhodial is part of Upper Pakhli which is homeland to Gabri Swatis. Dhodial is inhabited by two out of 7 subsections of Gabris i.e Arghushal Swatis and Malkal Swatis. Some other tribes also live in minority here but the 95% lands of Dhodial belongs to Swatis. According to Hazara Gazetteer 1883, Dhodial was given to Arghushal family and Malkal family in Nemkai division of Pakhli-1703. Sharifullah Khan Swati was the most prominent Jageerdar of Dhodial during British rule.
