= The Inevitable Flight =

- Directed by: Azfar Rizvi
- Release date: 2008
- Country: Pakistan

The Inevitable Flight is a documentary film made by Pakistani documentary filmmaker Azfar Rizvi.

== Subject ==
The film records the ongoing conflict between Dhodial Pheasantry and Hazara University, whose expansion plans will necessitate the relocation of the pheasantry.

== Background ==
Established for breeding and research purposes by the North West Frontier Province (NWFP) Wildlife Department in 1984, and with the support of the International Union for Conservation of Nature, Dhodial Pheasantry is the World Pheasant Association's first project in the wild. It is located on the Karakoram Highway, in Mansehra, Mansehra District, Pakistan.

Home to 32 of the 52 species of pheasants found in the world, the pheasantry now covers just over 21 acres (8.5 ha). Peafowl, the crested kalij, Lady Amherst, Siamese fireback, western tragopan, blue eared pheasant, brown eared pheasant, white eared pheasant, ring-necked pheasant, cheer pheasant, and the Himalayan monal are just some of the species housed by the pheasantry that are explored in the documentary.

One of the pheasantry's many successes is housing the world's largest flock of Cheer pheasants raised in captivity. This bird became extinct in the 1970s, and is now being re-introduced in the country. The pheasantry, besides accomplishing its primary purpose, also aims to educate the public about pheasant culture. In pursuit of this, the NWFP Wildlife Department formed an NWFP Wildlife Conservation Club. The Mansehra Club, alone, includes over three dozen public and private schools. The club focuses on strengthening the relationship between youth and nature. The documentary brings to light how diverse peoples can, and do, come together on a shared platform for the love of nature.

== Synopsis ==
What began with an accidental glance over a written piece on the pheasantry's eventual replacement took shape into a full-length documentary film. Dhodial Pheasantry, beyond everything else that it has done for conservation, and pheasant conservation in particular, put Pakistan on the map. The documentary aims at one thing alone - to leave its viewers with facts that allow them to decide for themselves whether it is Hazara University or Dhodial Pheasantry that is faced with an unjust inevitability.

Adding a spiritual element to this film that investigates the nature of conservation is the story of Welsh ecologist Robert Whale. Whale's decision to get married and stay back in Pakistan is an important element of the story being told. He made a deal with God, that if he caught a glimpse of the infamous western tragopan on film, he would embrace Islam. Now known as Rab Nawaz, he converted to Islam in 1998.

Furthermore, the documentary unravels the ongoing conflict of the pheasantry's re-location to alternate land such as the Jaba Sheep Farm, in order to accommodate Hazara University’s eventual expansion. The farm's director, Dr. Ghufranullah, has made clear that their livestock exceeds 600. The land that they have is enough only to cater to their own needs, as opposed to accommodating the needs of Dhodial Pheasantry as well. Hazara University wants to give preference to humans over birds. It is aiming for an eventual student count of 20,000 along the course of the expansion.

Chief Conservator of the Wildlife Department, Dr. Mumtaz Malik is concerned with the process of shifting habitats. Sometimes, birds can die as a result of tremendous stress level, which is incomparable to human stress level. Another huge issue is reports that the poultry farm that used to exist at the Jaba location earlier experienced bird flu and other diseases. As a result, entire flocks of poultry were wiped out. This is reinforced by the Zareef Khan Foundation’s president, Abid Zareef, whose NGO works for education empowerment. He maintains that there is the risk of transmission of both sheep and pheasant diseases. There is more danger in the spreading of diseases as there are no crosswinds because the location is surrounded by hills.

The film exposes all sides of the issue with a variety of stakeholder perspectives that sheds light on both the advantages and disadvantages of this inevitable relocation.
