= Baffa Pakhal =

Tehsil of Mansehra District, Pakistan

Baffa Pakhal Tehsil تحصیل بفہ پکھل
- Tehsil
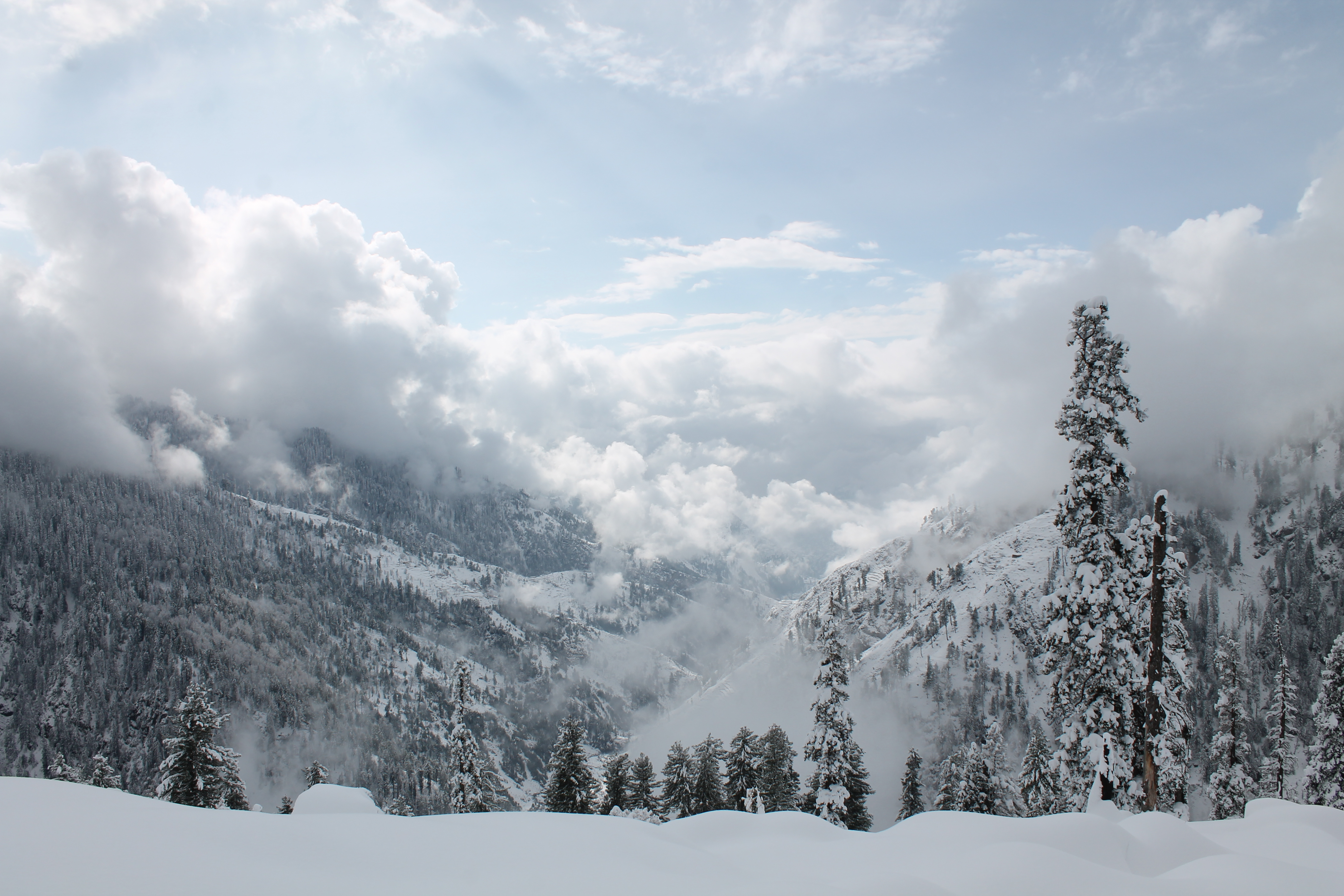
- Siran Valley in Baffa Pakhal

- Location in Khyber Pakhtunkhwa, Pakistan
- Coordinates: 34°26′30″N 73°13′0″E
- Country: Pakistan
- Province: Khyber Pakhtunkhwa
- District: Mansehra
- Region: Upper Pakhli

Government
  - MNA: Saleh Muhammad Khan Swati
  - MPA: Babar Saleem Swati

Population (2023)
  - Total: 455,544
- Time zone: UTC+5 (PST)

Baffa Pakhal is a tehsil of Mansehra District, in the Hazara Division of Khyber Pakhtunkhwa province, Pakistan.. The headquarters of Baffa Pakhal is at Baffa.

Baffa Pakhal has 15 union councils, including Dodial, Shinkiari, Suma Allimung, Schain, Jabar Daveli, Ichrian, Ail, Tanda, Baffa, Anayatabad, Hilkot, Tarangri Sabir Shah and Bhogarmang.

== Demographics ==
According to the 2023 national census, the total population of Baffa Pakhal Tehsil was 455,544. The largest languages were Hindko (213,404, 46.8%), Pashto (128,223, 28.1%) and Kohistani (11,364, 2.49%). 92,824 (20.3%) people, mainly the Gojri speakers, chose 'other language' during the census.
