= Mandagucha =

Village in Khyber Pakhtunkhwa, Pakistan

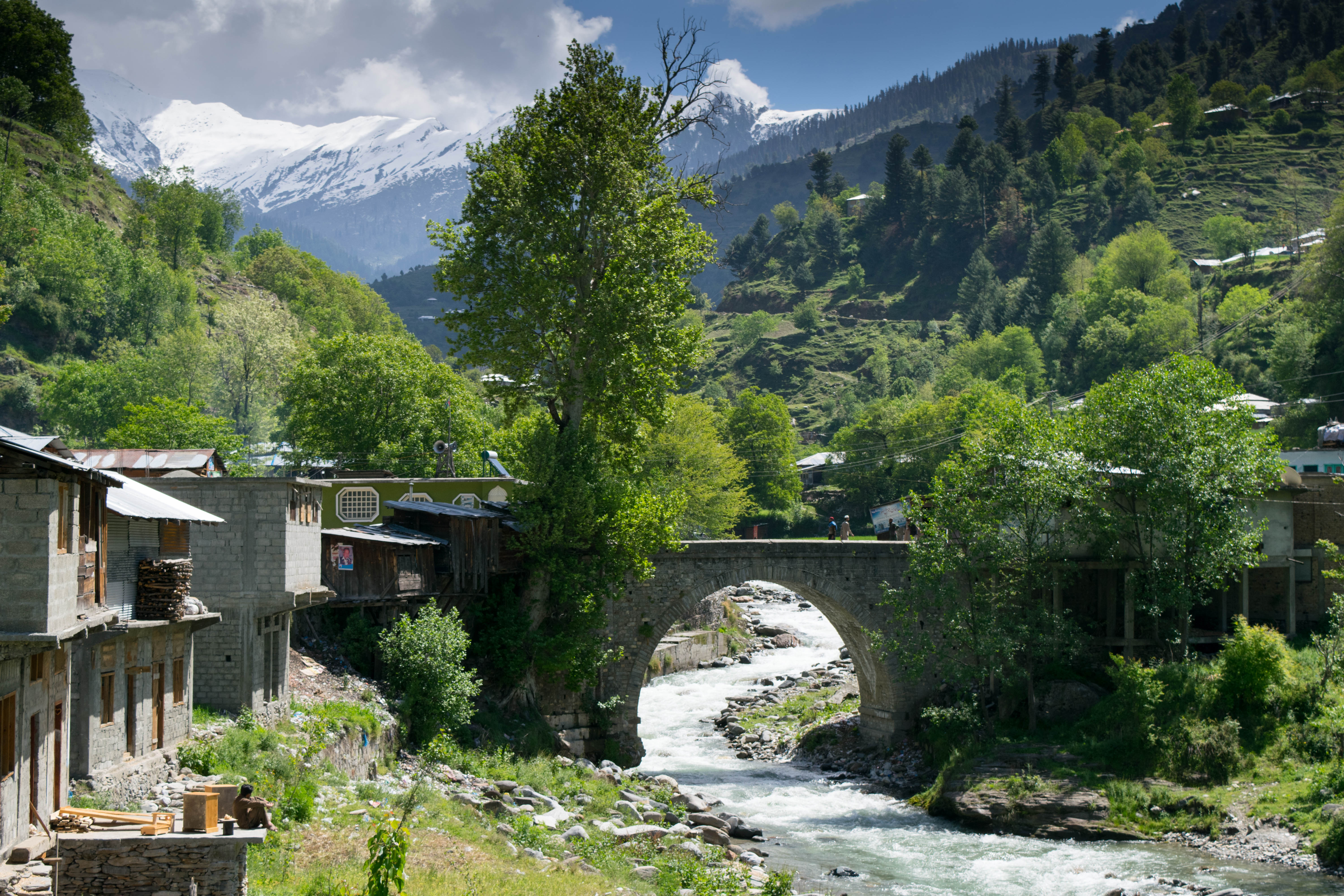

Mandagucha is a village located in Siran Valley, Mansehra District, Khyber Pakhtunkhwa, Pakistan. The village is on the route to one of the highest hilltops of the Himalaya series in Pakistan, Musa ka Musalla (13,500 feet above sea level), and has a cool climate. Mandaguchha is the last station that is reachable by car or public transport. Mandagucha is a tribal community of agriculturalists.

== Demographics ==
It has a population of around 20000 individuals. The major clans and casts are Gujjars, Syeds, Sawatis, Awans and Qureshis (Kotwals), Toda.

== History ==
The two influential Sawati families were Peer Khan family and Sultan Khan family. The village saw one of the most fierce conflicts between Gujjars and Sawatis in the late 1980s. This conflict was an outcome of years-long suppression of Gujjar clans by the land owner Sawatis. A Left-inclined Kisan Mahaz (Farmer Front) motivated the Gujjers to stand against oppressive landlords. The conflict resulted in many liberties for the tenant classes, like freedom from free labor, etc.
