= Shinkiari =

Pakistani administrative area

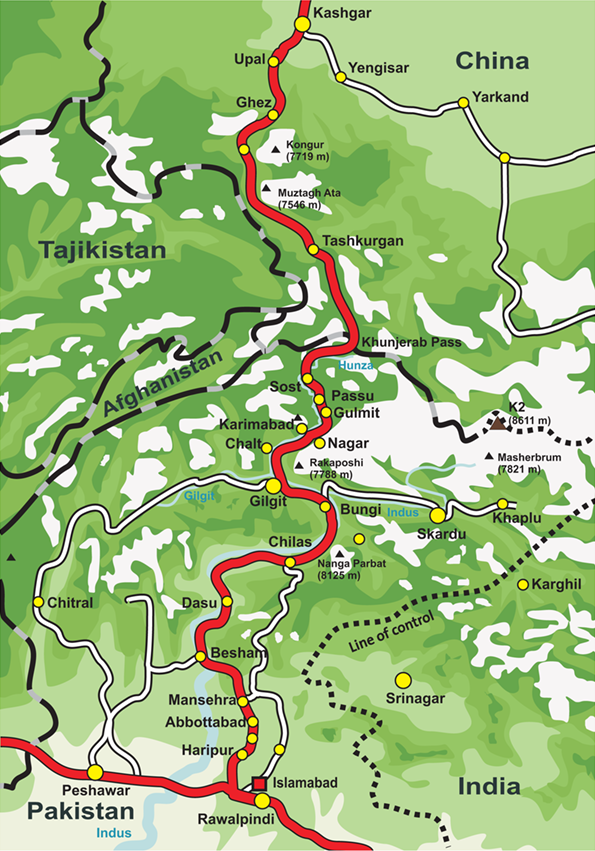
Karakoram Highway route map

Shinkiari (Pashto: شینکیارۍ; Hindko/Urdu: شنکیاری) is a Union Council of Mansehra District (Upper Pakhli) in the Khyber Pakhtunkhwa province of Pakistan. It is a major tea city with many tea gardens. The police station was established before the partition of India. At that time, Baffa was a police chowki of Shinkiari Police Station and a second police chowki was in Battal. Both chowkis have now become police stations while historically with poor political background Shinkiari is still a police station instead of a tehsil of Mansehra District. Most of the people are from the Swati Pashtun and Gujjar tribes, speaking Pashto and Hindko. Swatis are the biggest landlords here including Panjghol Swatis and Panjmerals Swatis who are further divided into many Khels/sub-clans.

== History ==
On 14th June 1847 boundary commissioner James Abbott arrived in the town en route to the northern boundary of Hazara, he noted the following in his journal:

"Marched hither en route for the northern boundary of Huzara. The state of things in the Jumboo Army is very perilous. The troops are in great distress for pay, and so great is the want of money that I am informed that 250 rupees which I have borrowed from the Government could not be raised until the Dewan, Kurrum Chund, had pledged his bracelets for it. I am discouraging complaints as much as possible, and assuring those who complain of having been made pay in excess of their rents, that the balance shall be placed to their credit in the succeeding."

== Etymology ==
Shinkiari is a combination of two Pashto words, shīn (شين) meaning "green" and kyārəi (کیارۍ) meaning "flowerbed".

== Geography ==
A specialty of the region is mineral water that has a sweet flavour. Its topography is very level towards Lower Pakhal. It is the very first city of Pakhal. It is a junction point for Siran Valley, Konsh Valley and Baffa.

Shinkiari is located 18 km north of Mansehra city on the Karakoram Highway, it is located at 34°28'0N, 73°16'60E at an altitude of 1019 metres (3346 feet). Due to its strategic location Shinkiari is also a base for the Pakistan Army. Pakistan Junior Leaders Academy (JLA) is the army training centre for juniors. The city is a major stop for people travelling north. It is a historical city. There is very flat cultivated land for vegetables, grains, sugar cane, tobacco leaves, rice and uses for many other agricultural purposes.

Pakistan Forest Institution College was reconstructed after the 2005 Kashmir earthquake and is located just 3 km away from the city toward the Great Forest (jungle) and the same way proceeds just towards Kund Bangla.

== Terrain ==
Shinkiari is known for cultivating the first tea garden in Pakistan because of its natural environment and terrain. One can access Kund Rest house 24 km away in the Jabori forest range over the top of the hill. This rest house was built during English empire in 1919. It was also damaged in the earthquake of 2005 and could not be rebuilt by The Government of Pakistan.

It should be administered as a tehsil due to its covered area of 14 joint union councils.
