= Sharkool =

Pakistani village

Sharkolai (also known as Sharkulai or Sharkūlai) is a large village comprising more than two hundred houses in Mansehra District of Khyber-Pakhtunkhwa province of Pakistan.

== Location ==
Sharkolai is located just one kilometer from the eastern side of the Chattar Plain of the Konsh Valley. It is located at 34°37′40″N 73°06′50″E at an altitude of 1599 metres (5249 feet).

== Ethnic groups ==
The majority of clans in Sharkolai belong to the Swati ethnic group, like Arghoshal, Jahangiri tribe, Khazan khels; also Khazani, Akhun Khels, and Akhund zada, Mandravi, and there is also another tribe Manshai and Quraish.

== Notable people ==
- Harris Rauf

== See also ==
- Manshera District
- Swatis
