= Musa ka Musalla =

Peak in Kaghan Valley

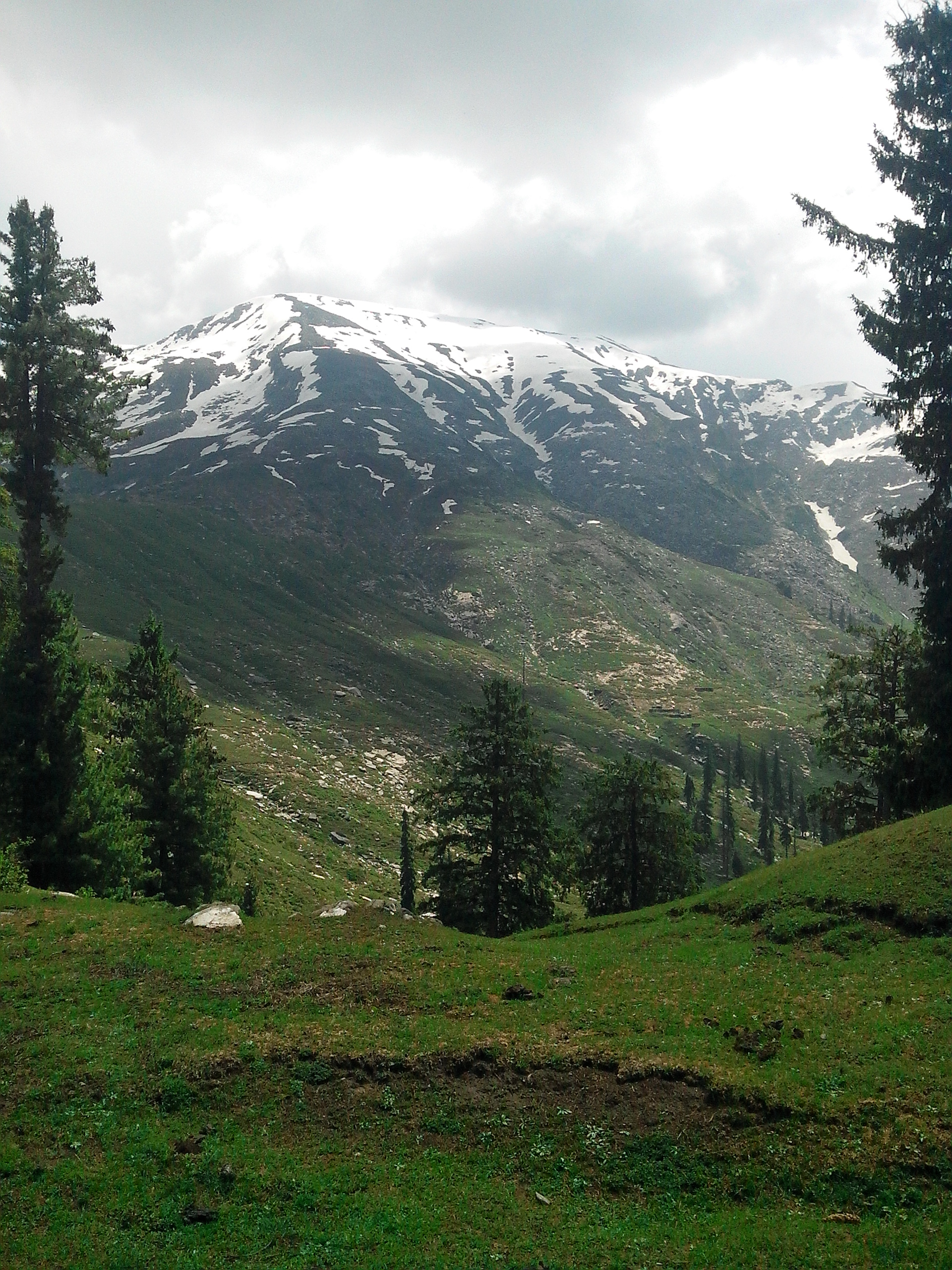

Highest point
- Elevation: 4,060 m (13,320 ft)
- Coordinates: 34.716044°N 73.360241°E

Geography
- Location: Mansehra, Khyber Pakhtunkhwa
- Parent range: Himalayas

Musa Ka Musalla (Urdu: موسیٰ کا مصلیٰ) is a peak situated at an altitude of about 4,060 metres (13,320 ft) at the junction of Siran Valley and the Himalayas in northern Pakistan. It is situated 150 kilometres (93 mi) east of the city of Abbottabad in Baffa Pkhal of Mansehra District.

== Etymology ==
The name Musa ka Musalla translates to Moses' mat. The legend has it that a shepherd named Musa used to pray there at the peak. There is also a shrine at the top probably of the same shepherd who is revered to as a saint by locals.

== Routes ==
The peak is accessible via multiple routes in summers but all needs hour of trekking.

- Balakot to Nadi Bangla and Kund Bangla route
- Paras to Sharran forest route
- Shinkiari to Mandagucha route
- Balakot to Nadi Bungalow to Sikkiyan Katha to Naaga Mosque to the ridge above Sarolian to Musa ka Musalla Basecamp Mosque (also called Danna Mosque) towards the peak. To go via this route, a jeep ride from Balakot takes you via Nadi Bungalow (crossing Kachal Katha) to a point (just under Maidan) above Sikkiyan Katha, where you can climb for 15 minutes and camp, or use Nakka Mosque as basecamp. It takes 1500+ meters (each) of ascent and descent from this point to reach the peak, and the trek is almost 7.5+ km long on each side. In favorable conditions, it takes almost 11+ hours to summit and reach back, based on the following minimum estimates:
  - 1.5 hours of trek from Maidan/Nakka Mosque to Naaga Mosque
  - 2 hours from Naaga Mosque to Musa ka Musalla Basecamp Mosque
  - 2 more hours from Musa ka Musalla Basecamp Mosque to the peak.

The Shinkiari to Manda Gucha route is the most commonly used route to reach the peak. This is also the trek used for winter summits.

== See also ==
- Malika Parbat
- Lalazar
