= Baffa =

Town in Khyber Pakhtunkhwa, Pakistan

Baffa بفه
- Town
- Location of Baffa in Pakistan Baffa (Pakistan)
- Country: Pakistan
- Province: Khyber Pakhtunkhwa
- District: Mansehra
- Tehsil: Baffa Pakhal Tehsil

Population (2023)
  - Total: 17,556
- Time zone: UTC+5 (PST)

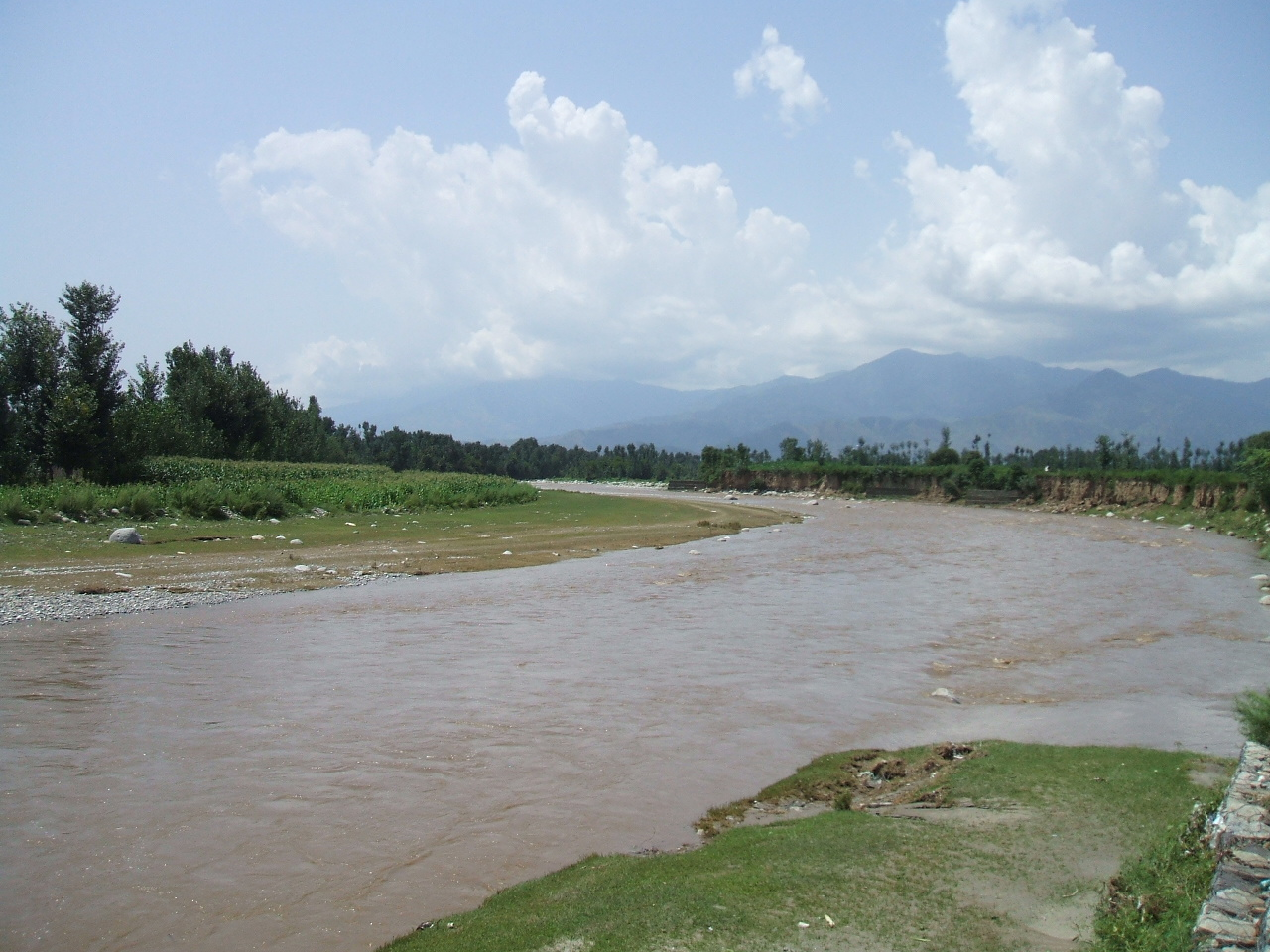
Along the Siran River in Baffa

Baffa (Urdu: بفہ Pashto :بفه ) is a town, a union council and capital of Tehsil Baffa Pakhal of Mansehra District in Khyber Pakhtunkhwa, Pakistan. It lies about 15 km north of the district capital, Mansehra.

== History ==
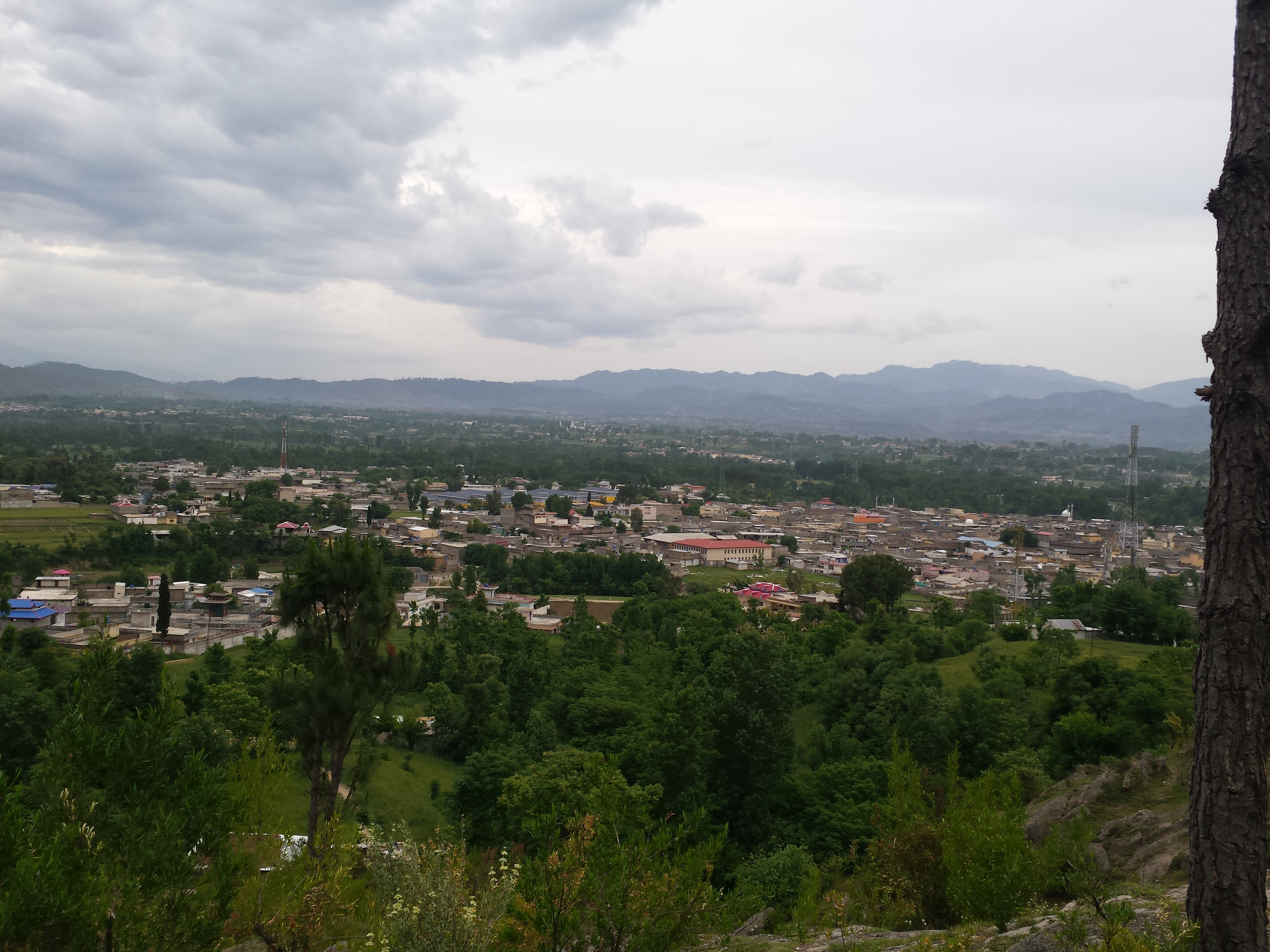
Aerial view of Baffa town

Baffa may date back to or prior to Sikh rule. It was given the status of a municipality in 1873 during British rule as a principal market town in Northern Hazara and of the neighbouring independent tracts. In 1901, the population was 7,029.

A vernacular middle school was maintained by the municipality and the District board. Baffa remained the educational hub for the Pakkhal Valley, Konsh Valley and Siran Valley because of the accommodation facility (hostel) attached to the Government Higher Secondary School there. At that time, this was the only high school for these three big valleys. The Municipal Committee of Mansehra took credits from the Municipal Committee of Baffa to fulfill its expenditures because the Municipal Committee of Baffa's income and revenue was more than Mansehra's.

Baffa is the resting place of Mulana Ghous Hazarvi and, historically, the rallying point for Turks in the region. Baffa members of union council and political leaders have been selected through democratic candidates and elections since the independence of Pakistan. There has never been royalties or kings after independence. All political parties of Pakistan have imprint in the Tehsil.

== Tea Cultivation ==
Tea cultivation was started for the first time in 1958 at village Baffa, district Mansehra and subsequently, in 1964 at Misriot Dam, Rawalpindi under the auspices of Pakistan Tea Board. The climate of Baffa is suitable for tea farming. Research about tea production in Pakistan was initiated by a local farmer. Privately owned tea farming in Baffa began in the late 1970s. The owner of Brook Bond, one of the world's leading tea companies, visited Baffa in the early 1980s and admired the farmer's research. The Government of Pakistan established Pakistan's first tea research centre, the National Tea Research Institute (NTRI), in Baffa. Pakistan's first tea was planted at Baffa. The Agricultural Extension Department and Agricultural Research System Department are both established there.

== Location ==
Baffa is situated in the Pakkhal valley of Mansehra District. The town is located on the east bank of the Siran river, in the north corner of the Pakkhli plain. Travelling via the Karakorum Highway, Baffa is 13 kilometres north-west of the district capital, Mansehra.

It is the headquarters of the historical Pakkhal Valley, also known as Pakkhal Plain. This valley is the last and largest plain between Pakistan and China. Deosai National Park is the biggest plain on the Pakistan-China Himalayan frontier, covering an area of 3000 km^{2}. Beyond the Pakkhal Valley are the world's highest mountains, the Himalayas.

The main cantonment for Turks in the region was established at the nearby village of Guli Bagh.

== Attractions ==
Major tourist attractions include shrines and mausoleums, most notably Nanga Baba shrine and Dewan Raja Baba Shrine. Natural tourist attractions include Sirran River, and Mount Tingalai.

Baffa is well known for its sweetened dairy product, colloquially called as "famous khoa of baffa".

== Demographics ==
=== Population ===
Historical population
Year	Pop.	±% p.a.
1951	5,702	—
1961	6,761	+1.72%
1972	8,515	+2.12%
1981	9,593	+1.33%
1998	11,842	+1.25%
2017	17,253	+2.00%
2023	17,556	+0.29%

As of the 2023 census, Baffa had a population of 17,556.

=== Languages ===
The ethnic groups of Baffa predominantly include the Pashto-speaking Swati tribe while the minority groups include Awans, Gujjars, and a few Turks.

The primary language spoken is Pashto, while a smaller portion of the population also speaks Hindko.

=== Religion ===
Nearly the whole population is of the Sunni Muslim sect, save for a few Shia's. Many notable Ulamas live in the town who are recognised nationwide.

== Education ==
Baffa's literacy rate has seen a remarkable jump in recent decades, fostered by numerous public and private educational institutions catering to the town and surrounding areas. While boasting one government Higher Secondary School each for boys and girls, Baffa enjoys proximity to Hazara University for higher education aspirations.

Historically, Baffa played a pivotal role as an educational hub for the northern Hazara division before partition. Established in 1873, the Government Primary School Baffa paved the way, followed by the Government Middle School in 1906 and the Higher Secondary School in 1934, all before partition. During this era, Baffa held the distinction of being the only town in northern Hazara with an intermediate-level institution.

== Agriculture ==
Baffa is an agricultural hub and is the leading town of the district in producing different crops and vegetables. Baffa grows vegetables, wheat, maize, rice, sugarcane and tobacco. The area's "Super Virginia" Tobacco is considered to be the world's second best. "Lacson Tobacco Company Limited" and "Pakistan Tobacco Company" operate in the area. Tomatoes, potatoes, tea and other vegetables are cultivated by most farmers in baffa. The climate of Baffa is suitable for tea farming. Research about tea production in Pakistan was initiated by a local farmer. Privately owned tea farming in Baffa began in the late 1970s. The owner of Brook Bond, one of the world's leading tea companies, visited Baffa in the early 1980s and admired the farmer's research. The Government of Pakistan established Pakistan's first tea research centre, the National Tea Research Institute (NTRI), in Baffa. Pakistan's first tea was planted at Baffa. The Agricultural Extension Department and Agricultural Research System Department are both established there.

== Development ==
A bridge constructed by the British government in 1935 links the small town Inayat Abad to Baffa. In 2002, floods damaged it badly; however, it was reconstructed.

Little development occurred from 1995 to 2015. Despite its success as a top quality cultivator of tobacco, Baffa does not have high quality tobacco roasting facilities. Baffa was affected by the October 2005 earthquake, although less than surrounding areas.

Electricity projects were started in the mid-1950s. The telecommunication sector of Pakistan, PTCL, started service in the mid-1970s. One public hospital is there.

Local commerce is carried out in the city centre, specially commercial center Adnan Plaza nearby.

== Sports ==
Sports activities in Baffa include football, volleyball and cricket. Every year, tournaments are held at the khair maidan ground. The most popular games are cricket and football. Football is a popular sport in the town and now there are almost half a dozen active football clubs in the town competing in tournaments in and out of the town.
