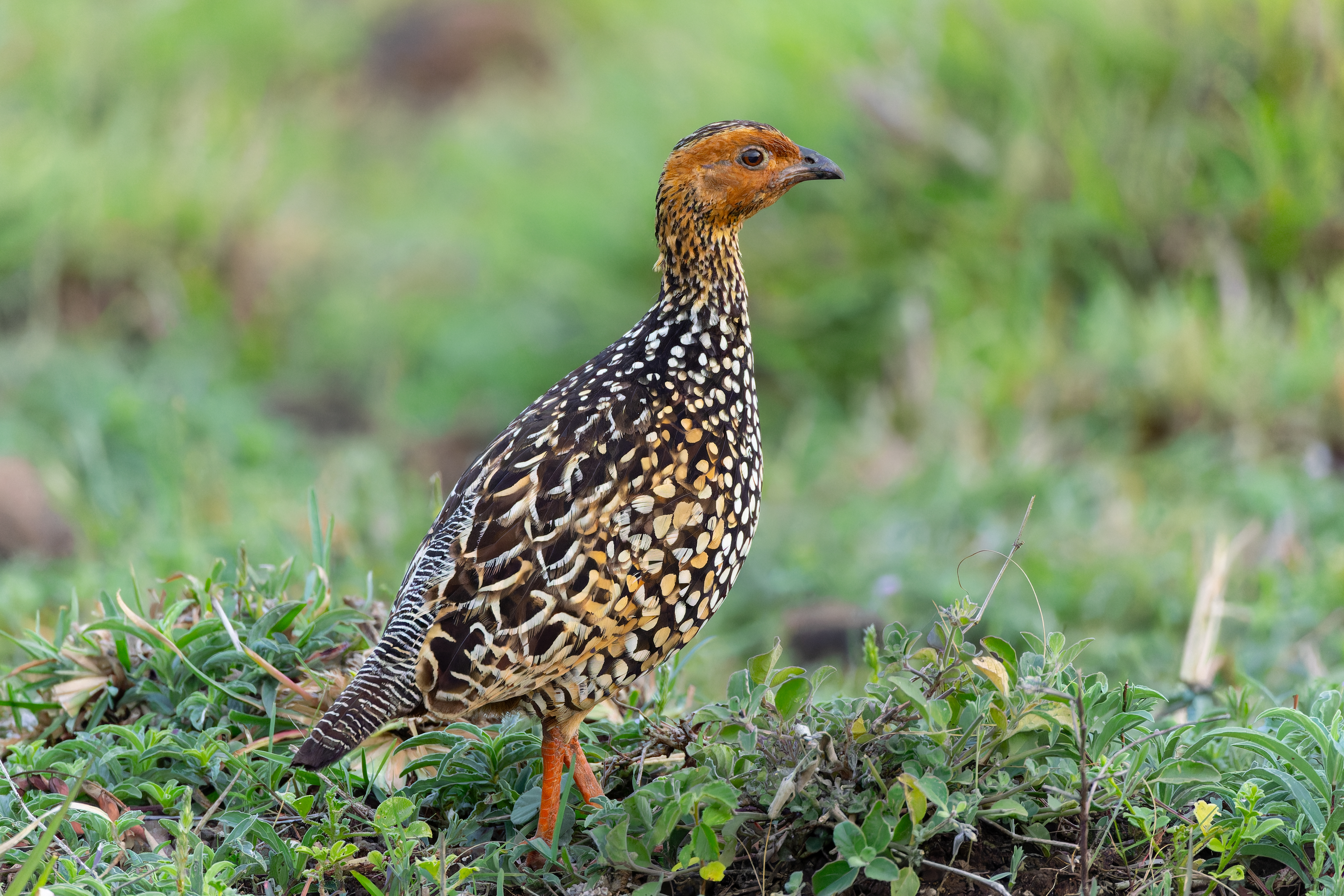
- in Bhigwan, Maharashtra Call

Conservation status
- Least Concern (IUCN 3.1)

Scientific classification
- Kingdom: Animalia
- Phylum: Chordata
- Class: Aves
- Order: Galliformes
- Family: Phasianidae
- Genus: Francolinus
- Species: F. pictus

Binomial name
- Francolinus pictus (Jardine & Selby, 1828)
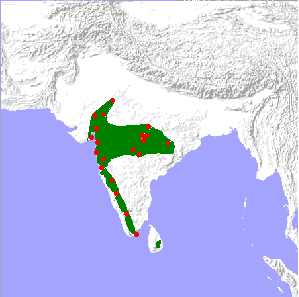

Synonyms
- Perdix picta Perdix hepburnii

= Painted francolin =

Species of bird

The painted francolin or painted partridge (Francolinus pictus) is a species of francolin found in grassy areas in central and southern India and in the lowlands of southeastern Sri Lanka. Thomas C. Jerdon noted that the species was found mainly in Central India south of the Narmada and to the east of the Western Ghats as well as the Chota Nagpur and Northern Circars. It partly overlaps with the black francolin with which it is said to sometimes hybridize. This species can be distinguished from a black francolin female by the lack of a rufous hind collar and the white spots on the underside. The face is rufous and there is no dark stripe running behind the eye.

== Description ==
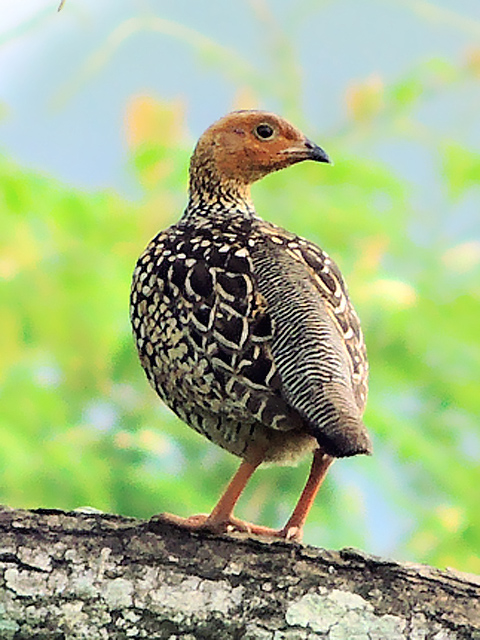

This species is endemic to the Indian subcontinent. It is distributed patchily from Rajasthan and Uttar Pradesh in its northernmost range, to Gujarat in the west, Chattisgarh, Telangana and Andhra Pradesh in the south-east, and south into northern Karnataka, and in Sri Lanka. In the past, the species was described as occurring in peninsular India "but not along the Malabar coast and rare south of Coimbatore", but recent records show the species' distribution to stop well north of Coimbatore. The species interbreeds with the black francolin along its northern distribution range and appears similar to the female of that species but has no rufous hindcollar, instead having a bright rufous face and throat. The underside has white spots while the legs are orange-yellow to red. It is more arboreal in its habits than the black francolin. The legs of both sexes have no spurs.

The species was described by P. J. Selby based on a specimen obtained by his nephew John Atherton of Bangalore (commemorated in Nyctyornis athertoni). The type locality has been designated as Bangalore although the specimen likely came from further north. Analysis of mitochondrial DNA has resolved the recent ancestor of the painted francolin to be from the Indian subcontinent.

Three subspecies have been named. The nominate population are from Central and South India south of 20°N while to the north is the form pallidus (type locality Udaipur). This form is paler on the upperparts. The Sri Lankan race is watsoni.

Populations change during and after the monsoons, and hunters have been known to capture nearly 300 from some areas.

== Distribution and habitat ==
The northern edge of the distribution of this species overlaps with the southern most distribution range of the black francolin, with most of the distribution being south of that of the black francolin. It is found patchily distributed in semi-dry undulating grasslands with scrub or cultivation. It is found in drier areas than the black francolin but wetter zones than the grey francolin.

In Sri Lanka, it is found in Bibila and Nilgala forest reserve of Gal Oya National Park in Uva plains.

== Behaviour and ecology ==
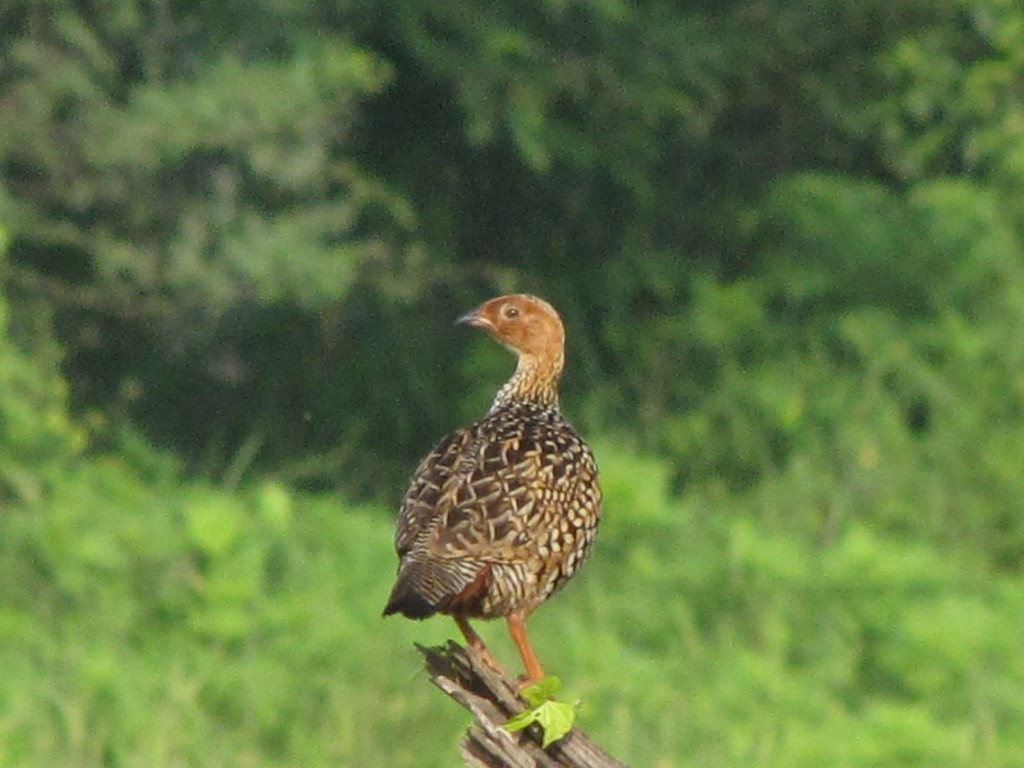
Painted francolin calling from a perch in Pune, India

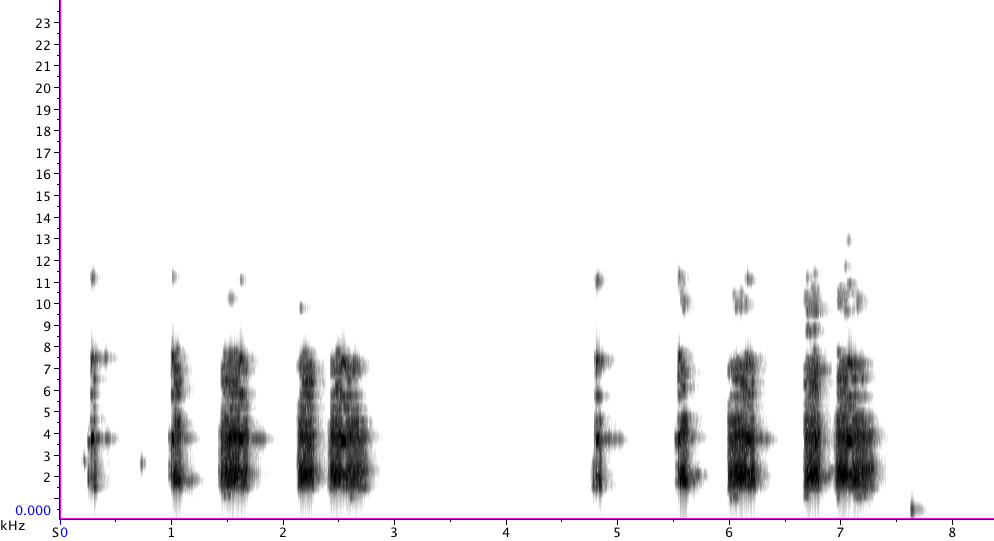
Sonogram of call of painted francolin

They are not easy to spot during most of the year but become vocal during the breeding season after the Monsoons, from June to October. The call is made in the early morning and has been described as guttural broken crow "chee-kee-kerray- Chee-kee-kerray" which is answered by other birds in the vicinity. A preliminary click may be heard when at close range. It is usually seen calling from an elevated position such as a mound, bush or tree stump. During the non-breeding season, they may call at dusk. The nest is a scrape in the ground. Six or seven smoky white eggs are laid.

They feed on grass seeds (including Brachiaria ramosa) as well as grains of cultivated rice. Beetles and other insects are also eaten. They also feed on the tuberous roots of Cyperus rotundus.

When walking around it sometimes has the habit of cocking up its tail and when disturbed it usually freezes and flushes only when approached very close. It roosts in trees and sometimes also on the ground.

== In culture ==
This bird appears in a 4.50 rupee Sri Lankan postal stamp.
