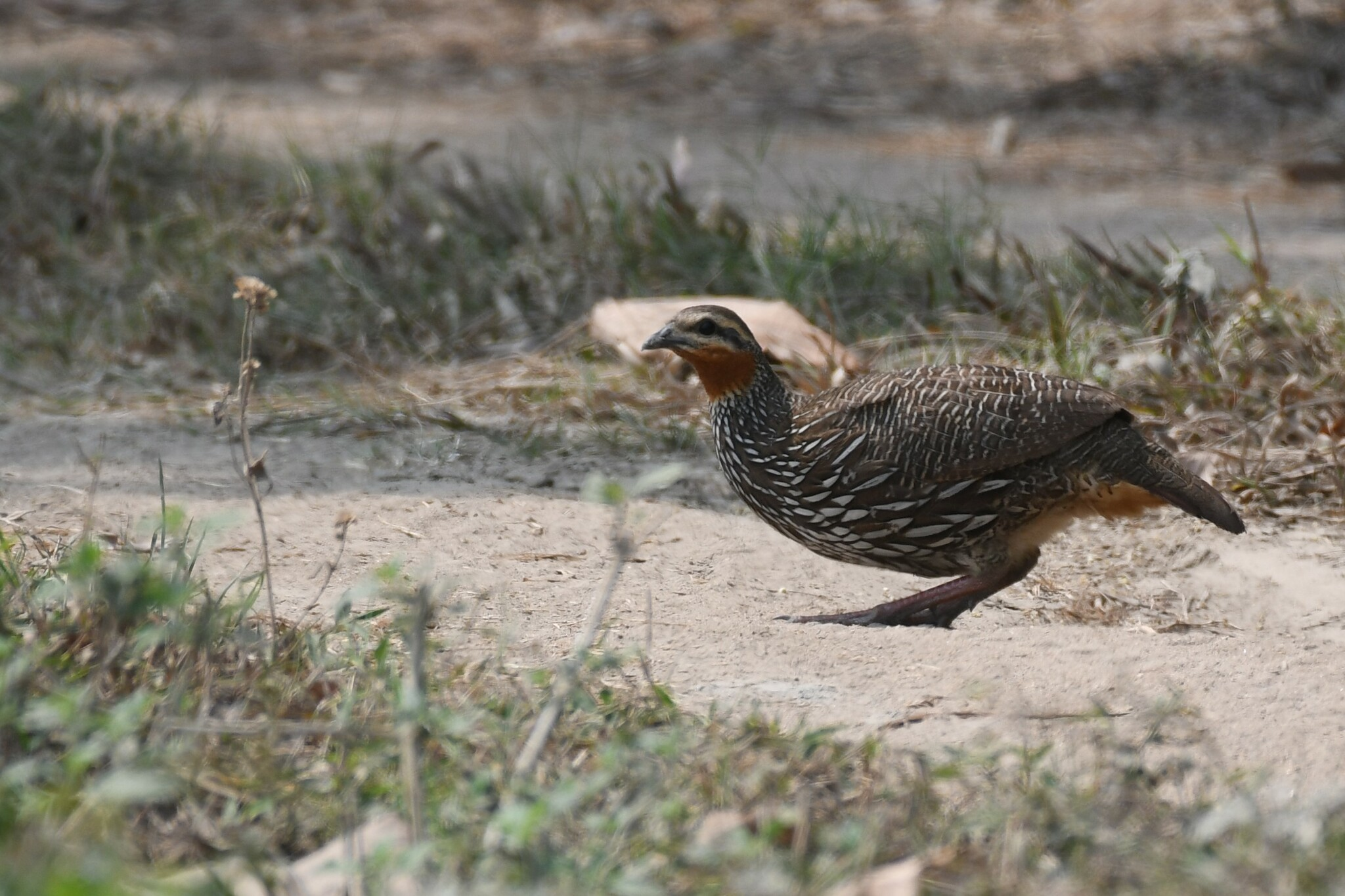

Conservation status
- Near Threatened (IUCN 3.1)

Scientific classification
- Kingdom: Animalia
- Phylum: Chordata
- Class: Aves
- Order: Galliformes
- Family: Phasianidae
- Genus: Ortygornis
- Species: O. gularis

Binomial name
- Ortygornis gularis (Temminck, 1815)

Synonyms
- Francolinus gularis

= Swamp francolin =

Species of bird

The swamp francolin (Ortygornis gularis), also called swamp partridge, is a francolin species native to the foothills of the Himalayas in northern India and Nepal. It is considered extinct in the Ganges-Brahmaputra delta in Bangladesh. It is listed as Near Threatened on the IUCN Red List.

== Taxonomy ==
The swamp francolin was formerly classified in the genus Francolinus, but phylogenetic analyses indicates that it groups with the crested francolin (O. sephaena) and grey francolin (O. pondicerianus). All three species were reclassified in the genus Ortygornis.

== Description ==
From Frank Finn's The Game Birds of India & Asia (1911):

This species is easily distinguished from most of our partridges by its large size and comparatively long legs; as in the last species, the sexes are alike in plumage, but the cock is easily distinguishable by his spurs. The upper plumage is brown barred with buff, and the outer tail-feathers chestnut, as in the grey partridge; but the throat is bright rust-red, and the rest of the under-parts brown longitudinally streaked with white. The bill is blackish, the eyes dark, and the feet dull red. The cock of this species, which is a little larger than the hen, will measure fifteen inches, though his tail is only a little over four; the wing is more than seven inches, and the shank two-and-a-quarter.

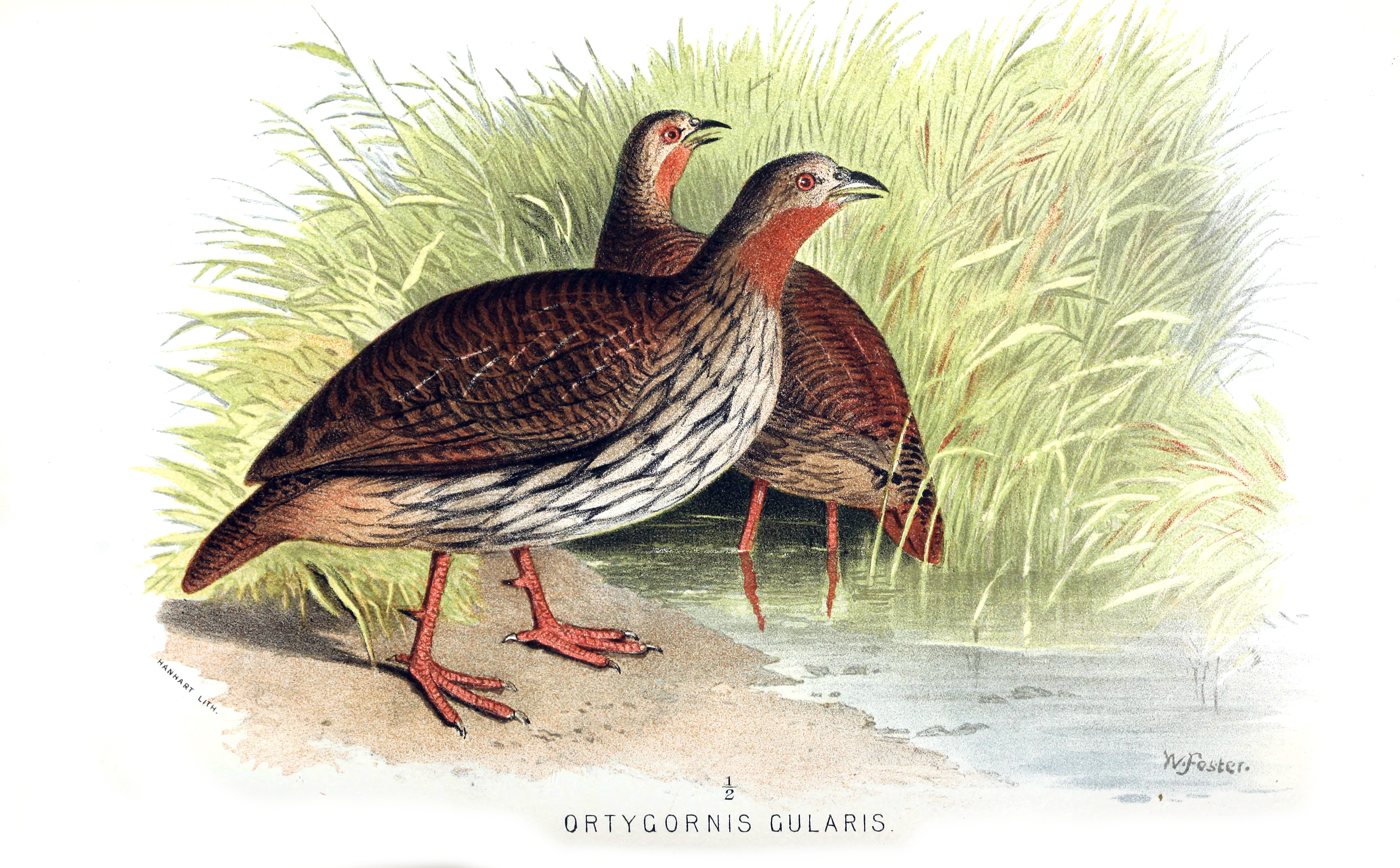
Picture from Hume and Marshall.

The swamp partridge, as its name implies, has a habitat quite different from our other species, affecting high grass and cane-brakes near the edges of rivers and jheels, though it will come into cultivated ground to feed. It haunts the alluvial plains of the Ganges and Brahmaputra, extending from Pilibhit to the extremity of Assam and Cachar, and even occurs occasionally on the Khasi plateau; but it is not found in the Sundarbans. Very little is known about its breeding, but on two occasions five eggs of the species have been taken in April; they were cream-coloured and slightly speckled.

Owing to the localities which it frequents, the swamp partridge is usually shot from elephants; but Blanford states that he has shot it on foot near Colgong, in grass only three or four feet high. He says it much resembles the common grey partridge in its edible qualities, as it also does in its call; and it is equally pugnacious. Mr Hume, in the "Game-birds of India," falls foul of his artist for representing this species standing in water like a wading-bird. No doubt the draughtsman represented it thus in ignorance, but it would be interesting to know if this, one of the very few swamp-haunting birds in the pheasant family, ever does voluntarily go into water in the wild state. The keeper of the aviary in which a specimen of this species was confined in the London Zoo told me that he had seen it standing in water.

== Distribution ==
The Sukla Phanta Wildlife Reserve in Nepal represents the western limit of its distribution.
