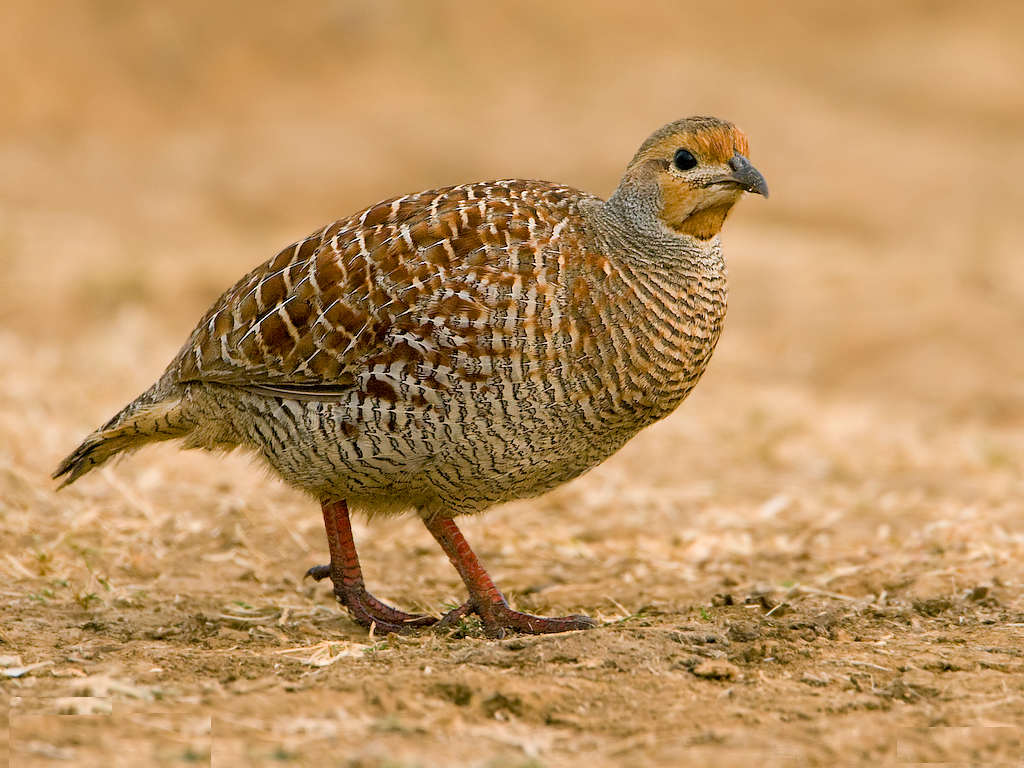
- O. pondicerianus

Scientific classification
- Kingdom: Animalia
- Phylum: Chordata
- Class: Aves
- Order: Galliformes
- Family: Phasianidae
- Tribe: Gallini
- Genus: Ortygornis; Reichenbach, 1852

Type species
- Tetrao pondicerianus (grey francolin) Gmelin, SF, 1789

Species
- Ortygornis sephaena Ortygornis pondicerianus Ortygornis gularis

Synonyms
- Dendroperdix (Smith, 1836)

= Ortygornis =

Genus of birds

Ortygornis is a genus of birds in the francolin group of the family Phasianidae.

== Taxonomy ==
The genus Ortygornis was introduced in 1852 by the German naturalist Ludwig Kaiser to accommodate a single species, the grey francolin, which is therefore the type species. The name combines the Ancient Greek ortux meaning "quail" with ornis meaning "bird".

The genus now contains three species, one found in Sub-Saharan Africa and two found South Asia (with one also being found in Iran). The species are:

Genus Ortygornis – Reichenbach, 1852 – three species
Common name	Scientific name and subspecies	Range	Size and ecology	IUCN status and estimated population
Crested francolin	Ortygornis sephaena (Smith, 1836) Five subspecies: O. s. grantii (Hartlaub, 1866); O. s. rovuma (Gray, GR, 1867) - Kirk's francolin; O. s. spilogaster (Salvadori, 1888); O. s. zambesiae (Mackworth-Praed, 1920); O. s. sephaena (Smith, A, 1836)	southern Africa.	Size: Habitat: Diet:	LC
Grey francolin	Ortygornis pondicerianus (Gmelin, JF, 1789) Three subspecies: O. p. mecranensis (Zarudny & Härms, 1913); O. p. interpositus (Hartert, E, 1917); O. p. pondicerianus (Gmelin, JF, 1789)	India and Iran.	Size: Habitat: Diet:	LC
Swamp francolin	Ortygornis gularis (Temminck, 1815)	the Himalayas in northern India and Nepal.	Size: Habitat: Diet:	NT

Of the three species, the crested francolin was formerly placed in its own monotypic genus, Dendroperdix, while the two Asian species were formerly placed in Francolinus. Phylogenetic analyses support these three species grouping together as a distinct clade.
