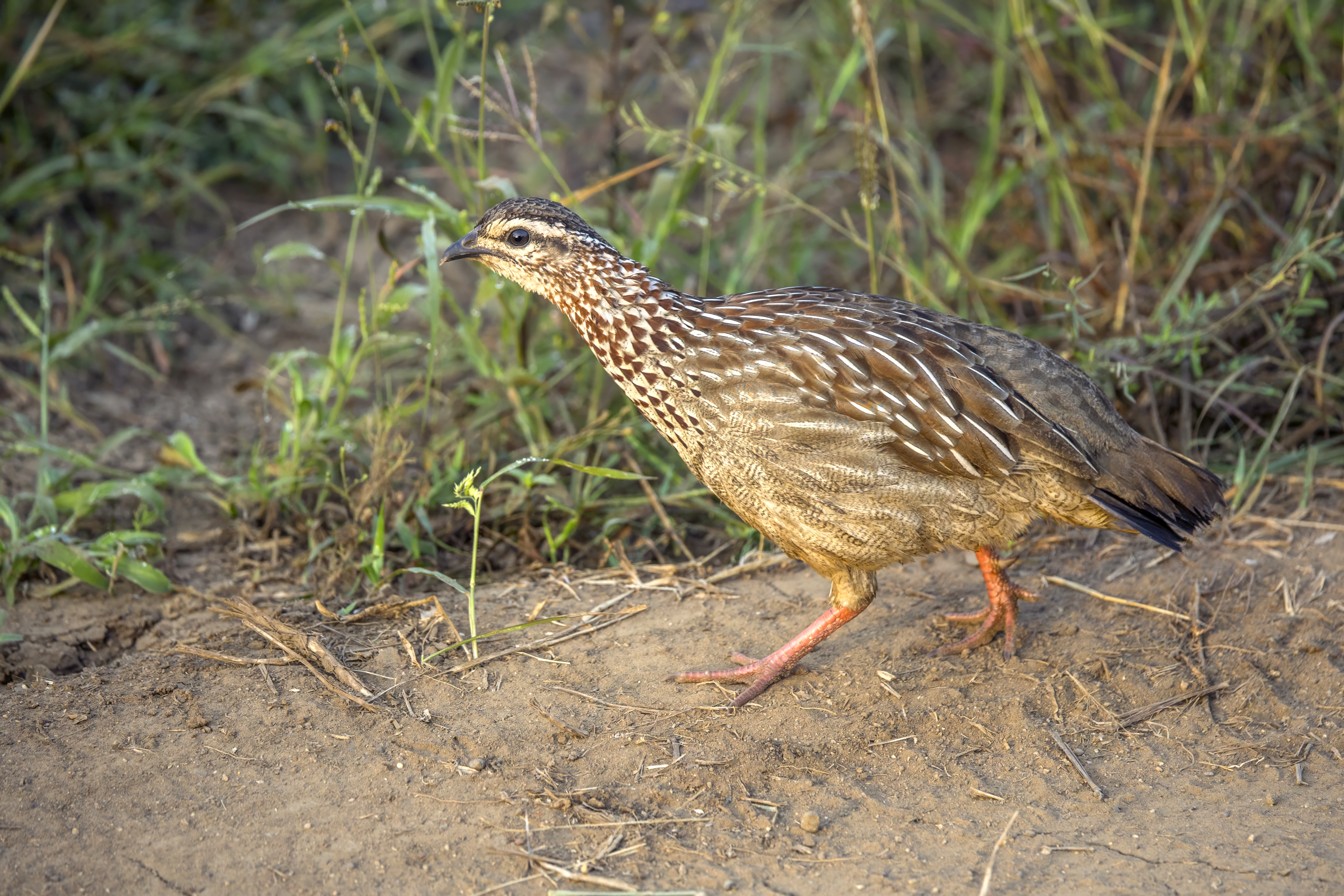

Conservation status
- Least Concern (IUCN 3.1)

Scientific classification
- Kingdom: Animalia
- Phylum: Chordata
- Class: Aves
- Order: Galliformes
- Family: Phasianidae
- Genus: Ortygornis
- Species: O. sephaena

Binomial name
- Ortygornis sephaena (Smith, 1836)

Synonyms
- Francolinus sephaena; Dendroperdix sephaena; Peliperdix sephaena

Audio

= Crested francolin =

Species of bird

The crested francolin (Binomial name: Ortygornis sephaena) is a species of bird in the family Phasianidae. It is found in southern and eastern Africa. One of its subspecies, Ortygornis sephaena rovuma, is sometimes considered a separate species, Kirk's francolin.

== History ==
The crested francolin was first described in 1836 by Andrew Smith. Previously, it was under the genus Dendroperdix before being renamed. It has many colloquial names: the crested partridge, Smith's spotted francolin, and, in Afrikaans, as the bospatrys.

== Description ==
Crested francolins are notable for the white stripe across its forehead and white throat. There is a small degree of sexual dimorphism. Adult males are brightly colored and have spurs on their legs, females are more dull in color. Female crested francolins have cross-bars on their lower backs, whereas males have speckles.

Young male crested francolins (4 months or younger) resemble females. Their spurs grow at a rate of 1.5–2 mm per month. Around 5-6 months of age, the male crested francolins develop serrated back and tail feathers. After 6 months, they are indistinguishable from adult males.

Crested francolin chick in Mpumalanga, South Africa

Kirk's francolin, currently considered a subspecies, has a streaked lower abdomen. In general, their spurs are shorter than the main species.

== Distribution and habitat ==
The crested francolin is common in woody habitats like woodland, scrubland and thornveld. Its livable range is across Eastern Africa, from Ethiopia to northern parts of South Africa. Kirk's francolin can be found in Mozambique to the Save River.

Crested Francolin feeding on dung at Pilanesberg National Park, Northwest Province, South Africa

== Behavior ==
For food, the crested francolin is an omnivore and forages for fruits and insects on the ground. They spend most of their life on the ground foraging and in their nests, often hidden under a bush. Insects they most commonly consume include millipedes, small caterpillars, termites, grasshoppers, and other beetles. During the winter, tree resin from Acacia makes up a large part of their diet.

Crested francolins in a covey with their chicks.

The non-breeding season is the dry winter months, typically from March to May. Breeding season begins during October and November and ends around February, during the summer rainfall season. During breeding season, males call out "‘tjee tjerer tjee tjerer tjee". They may fight over potential female mates and bring them offerings of food. Females attract males by lowering their wings while walking to give the appearance of a hunchback.

Crested francolins are monogamous and their family groups can be up to 7 birds in size, 2 parents and 5 children. They lay eggs from October to March. Female crested francolins incubate the eggs and develop brood patches. Both parents raise the young from January to May, after which the offspring are independent of their parents.

When the crested francolin is alarmed, the feathers on its head will stand up, resembling a mohawk. As they walk, the crested francolin tilts its tail upwards, resembling a bantam hen.

== Taxonomy ==
Formerly, the crested francolin was classified in its own genus Dendroperdix, but phylogenetic analysis indicates that it groups with the grey francolin (O. pondicerianus) and swamp francolin (O. gularis). As a result, all three species were reclassified into the genus Ortygornis.

Among African francolins, the crested francolin is most closely related to the Coqui francolin.

=== Subspecies ===
Subspecies include:

- Ortygornis sephaena grantii (Hartlaub, 1866)
- Ortygornis sephaena rovuma (Gray, GR, 1867), better known as Kirk's francolin
- Ortygornis sephaena sephaena (Smith, A, 1836)
- Ortygornis sephaena spilogaster (Salvadori, 1888)
- Ortygornis sephaena zambesiae (Mackworth-Praed, 1920)
  Crested francolin sub-species
  Male crested francolin (1838)
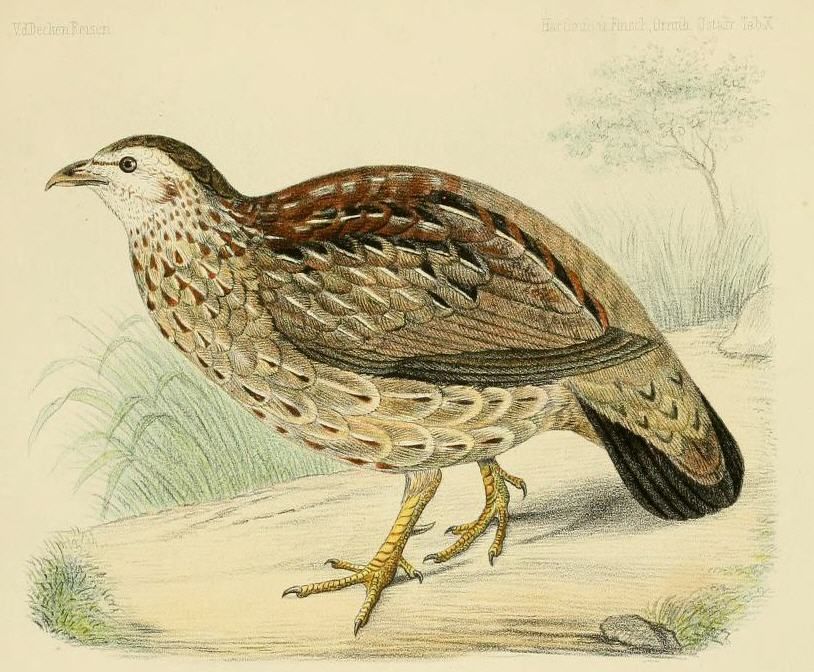
  Kirk's francolin (1870)
  Dendroperdix sephaena grantii (1865)
