= Jaborri =

Jaborri جبوری
- Town and Union Council
- Location within Pakistan
- Coordinates: 73.258102 34.605427°N 73.258102°E
- Country: Pakistan
- Region: Khyber-Pakhtunkhwa
- District: Mansehra district

Population
  - Estimate: 30,000
- Time zone: UTC+5 (PST)

Jabori (alternative spellings include Jaborri and Jabbori) is a village in Mansehra District in Khyber-Pakhtunkhwa, Pakistan. The village is also the administrative centre of Jabori Union Council. It is majorly populated by Jahangiri family of Swati tribe. Jagirdar Khan Zaman Khan Swati and Jagirdar Khan Kala Khan Swati were the famous chieftains of this village.

The population is about 30,000. The river Siran flows through the village, which is surrounded by mountains.
