= Battal =

Town in Khyber Pakhtunkhwa, Pakistan

Battal بٹل Konsh Valley
- Union council
- Interactive map of Battal
- Coordinates: 34°35′0″N 73°9′0″E
- Country: Pakistan
- Province: Khyber Pakhtunkhwa
- District: Mansehra district
- Elevation: 2,705 m (8,875 ft)
- Time zone: UTC+5 (PST)
- Postal code: 21090

Battal is a town and a union council (an administrative subdivision) of Mansehra district in Khyber Pakhtunkhwa province of Pakistan.

Battal is the headquarters of the Konsh Valley in Mansehra district. The town and valley are in a region severely damaged by the 2005 Kashmir earthquake.
