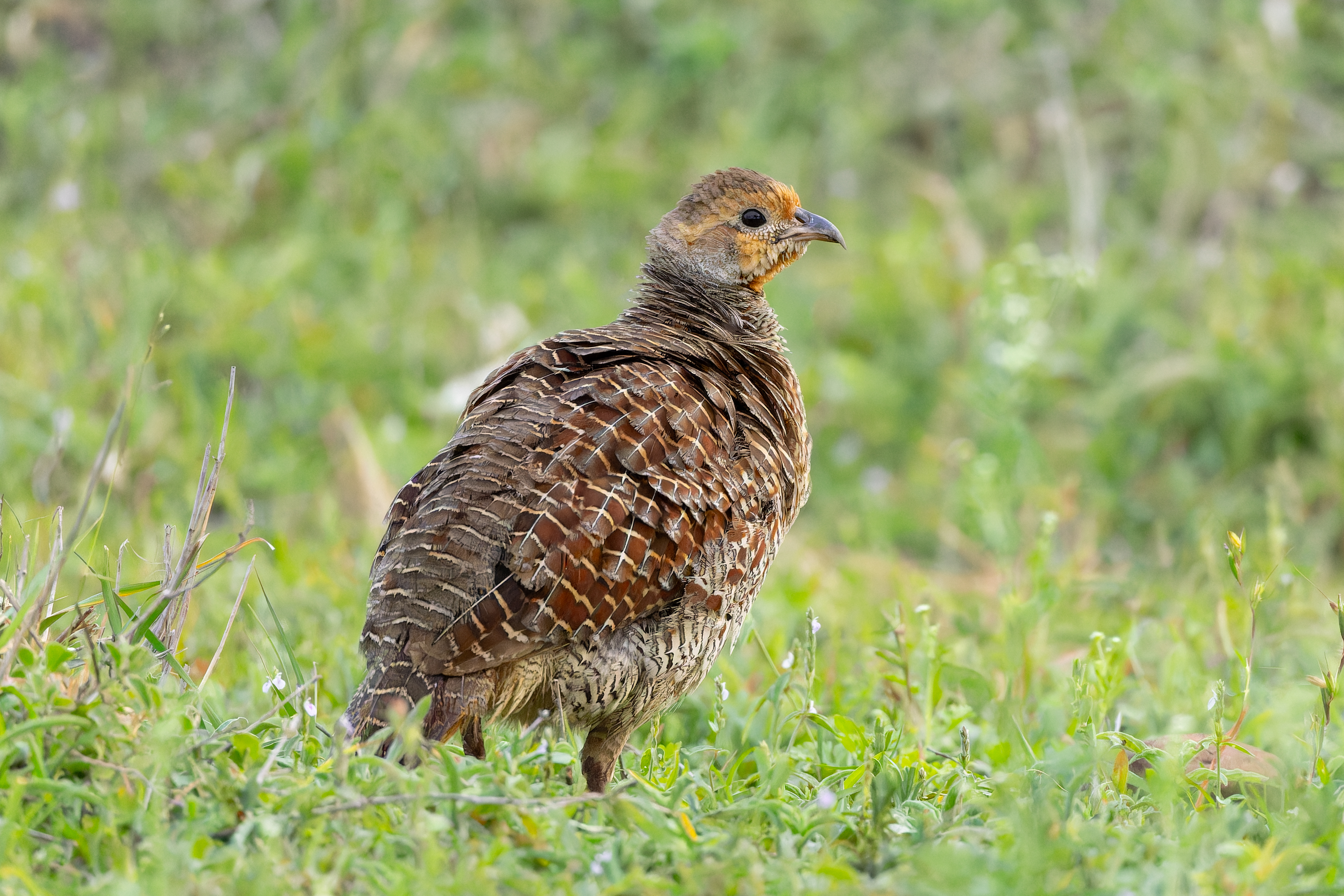
- Ortygornis pondicerianus in Bhigwan, Maharashtra, India., Calls

Conservation status
- Least Concern (IUCN 3.1)

Scientific classification
- Kingdom: Animalia
- Phylum: Chordata
- Class: Aves
- Order: Galliformes
- Family: Phasianidae
- Genus: Ortygornis
- Species: O. pondicerianus

Binomial name
- Ortygornis pondicerianus (Gmelin, JF, 1789)
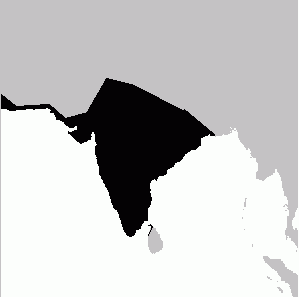

Synonyms
- Francolinus ponticerianus

= Grey francolin =

Species of bird

The grey francolin (Ortygornis pondicerianus) is a species of francolin found in the plains and drier parts of the Indian subcontinent and Iran. This species was formerly also called the grey partridge, not to be confused with the European grey partridge. They are mainly ground-living birds and are found in open cultivated lands as well as scrub forest and their local name of teetar is based on their calls, a loud and repeated Ka-tee-tar...tee-tar, which is produced by one or more birds. The term teetar can also refer to other partridges and quails. During the breeding season, calling males attract challengers, and decoys were used to trap these birds especially for fighting.

== Taxonomy ==
The grey francolin was formally described in 1789 by German naturalist Johann Friedrich Gmelin in his revised and expanded edition of Carl Linnaeus's Systema Naturae. He placed it with all the grouse-like birds in the genus Tetrao and coined the binomial name Tetrao pondicerianus. Gmelin based his description on "Le perdix de Pondichéry" that had been described in 1782 by French naturalist Pierre Sonnerat in his Voyage aux Indes orientales et a la Chine. The grey francolin was formerly placed in the genus Francolinus. Based on a phylogenetic study published in 2019, the grey francolin, together with the crested francolin and swamp francolin, were moved to the resurrected genus Ortygornis that had been introduced in 1852 by German naturalist Ludwig Reichenbach. The genus name combines the Ancient Greek ortux, meaning "quail", with ornis, meaning "bird". The specific epithet pondicerianus is from the toponym Pondicherry, a town in southeast India.

Three subspecies are recognised:

- O. p. mecranensis (Zarudny & Härms, 1913) – south Iran and south Pakistan
- O. p. interpositus (Hartert, E, 1917) – east Pakistan, north India, and Nepal
- O. p. pondicerianus (Gmelin, JF, 1789) – south India and Sri Lanka

== Description ==
This bird is a medium-sized francolin, with males averaging 11.6–13.4 in (29–34 cm) and females averaging 10.2–11.9 in (26–30 cm). The males weigh 9–12 oz (260–340 g), whereas the weight of the females is 7–11 oz (200–310 g). The francolin is barred throughout and the face is pale with a thin, black border to the pale throat. The only similar species is the painted francolin, which has a rufous vent. The male can have up to two spurs on the legs, while females usually lack them. Subspecies O.p. mecranensis is palest and found in arid north-western India, eastern Pakistan, and southern Iran. Subspecies O. p. interpositus is darker and intermediate found in northern India. The nominate race in the southern peninsula of India has populations with a darker rufous throat and supercilium and is richer brown. They are weak fliers, so fly short distances, escaping into undergrowth after a few spurts of flight. In flight it shows a chestnut tail and dark primaries. The race in Sri Lanka is sometimes given the name O. p. ceylonensis or considered as belonging to the nominate subspecies.

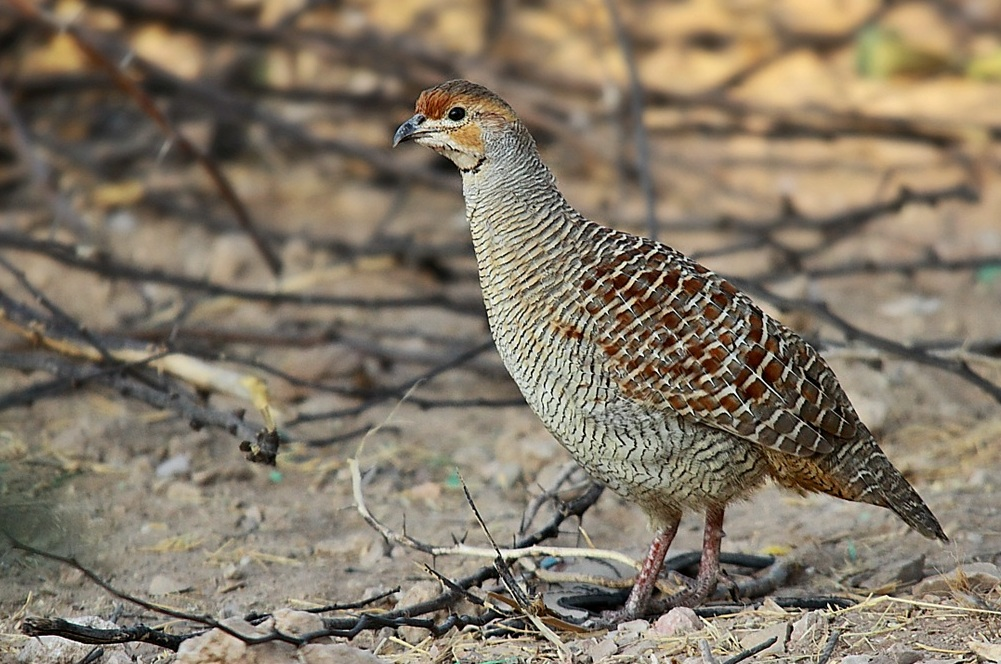
Grey francolin in Bikaner, Rajasthan, India

== Distribution and habitat ==
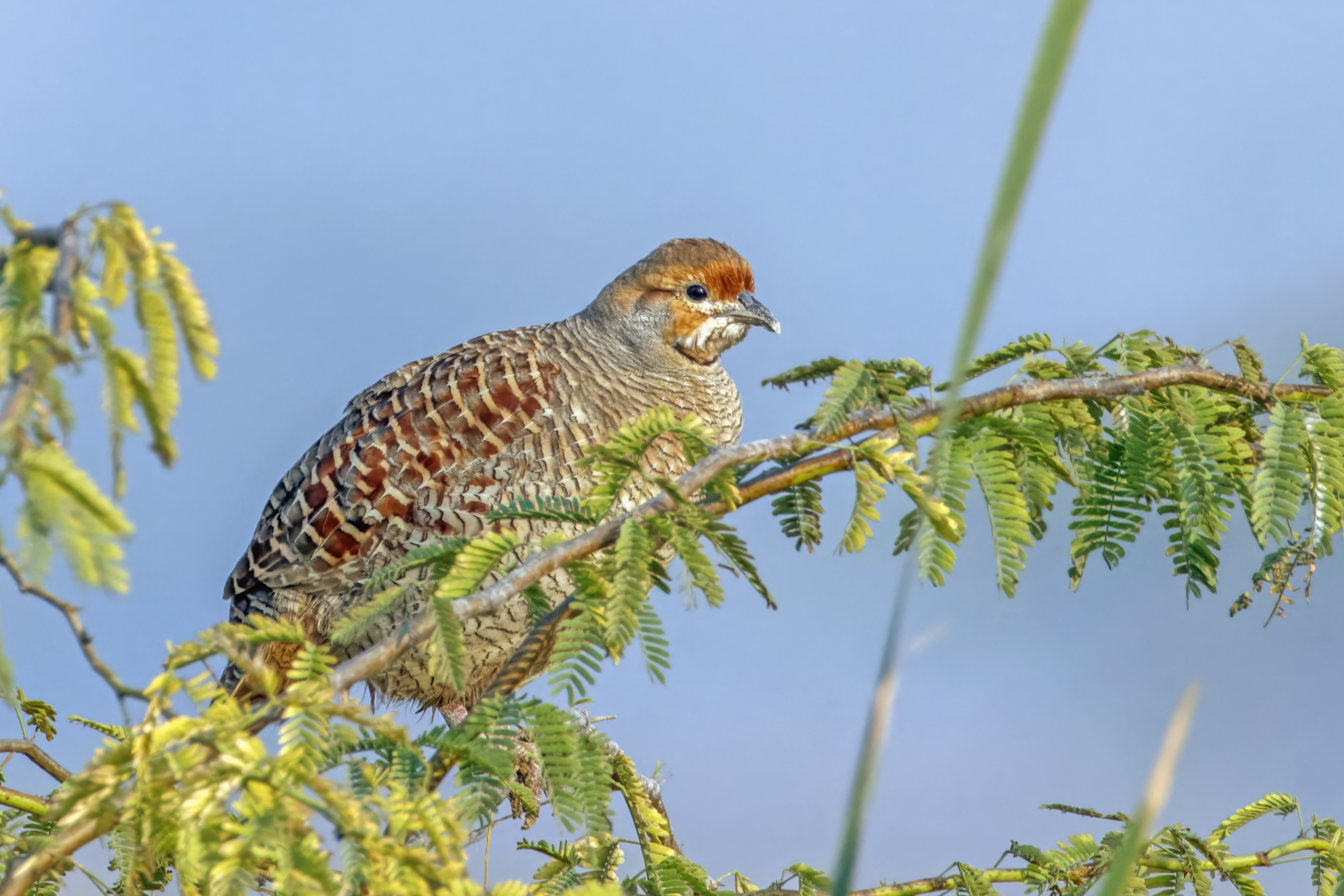

The grey francolin is normally found foraging on bare or low grass-covered ground in scrub and open country and is rarely found above an altitude of 500 m above sea level in India, and 1200 m in Pakistan. The distribution is south of the foothills of the Himalayas westwards to the Indus Valley and eastwards to Bengal. It is also found in north-western Sri Lanka. Introduced populations are found on the Andaman and Chagos Islands. They have been introduced to Nevada and Hawaii in the United States of America, along with several other species of francolins.

== Behaviour and ecology ==
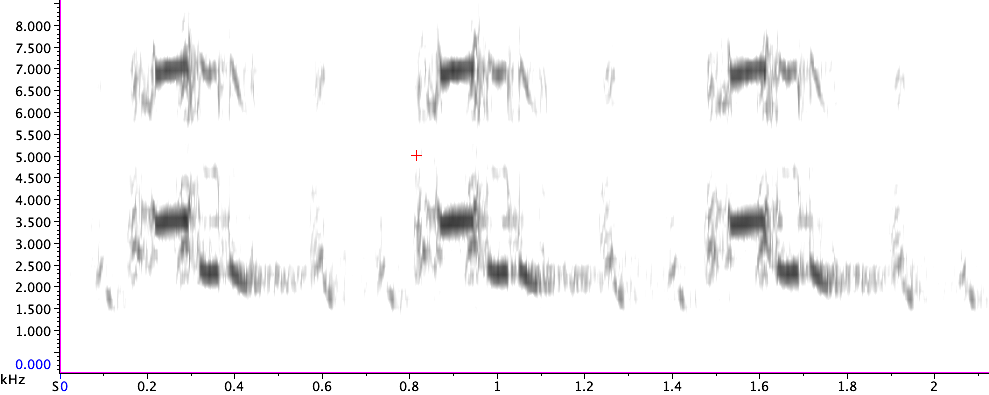
Sonogram of grey francolin's call

The loud calls of the birds are commonly heard early in the mornings. Pairs of birds sometimes engage in a duet. The female call is a tee...tee...tee repeated and sometimes a kila..kila..kila and the challenge call kateela..kateela..kateela is a duet. They are usually seen in small groups.

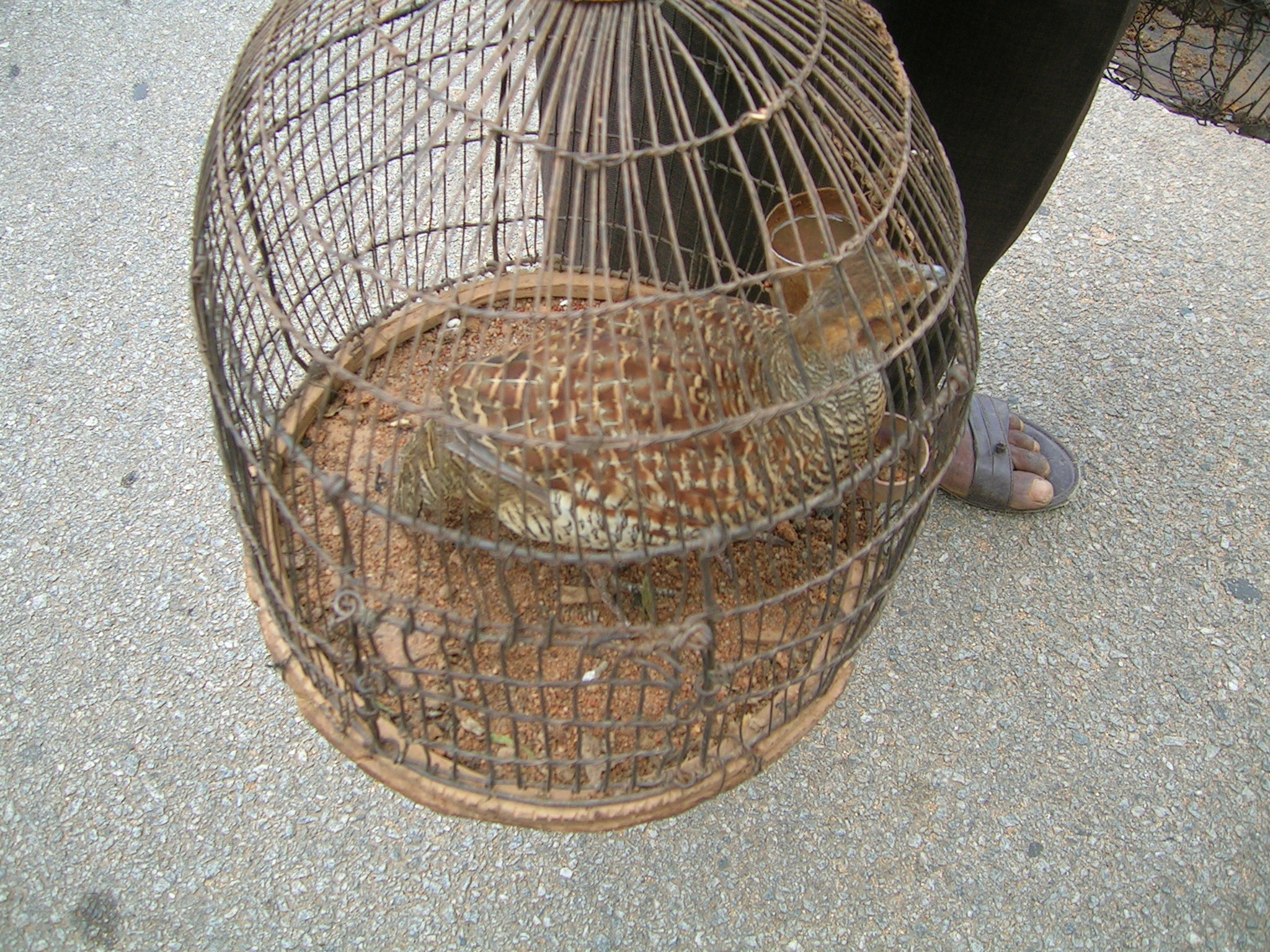
A captive decoy

The main breeding season is April to September, and the nest is a hidden scrape on the ground. The nest may sometimes be made above ground level in a niche in a wall or rock. The clutch is six to eight eggs, but larger clutches, potentially reflecting intraspecific brood parasitism, have been noted.

Food includes seeds and grains, as well as insects, particularly termites and beetles (especially Tenebrionidae and Carabidae). They may occasionally take larger prey such as snakes.

They roost in groups in low, thorny trees.

Several species of feather mites, helminths, and blood parasites have been described from the species.

== Status ==
They are hunted in much of their range using low nets, and they are easily caught using calling decoy birds.

== In culture ==
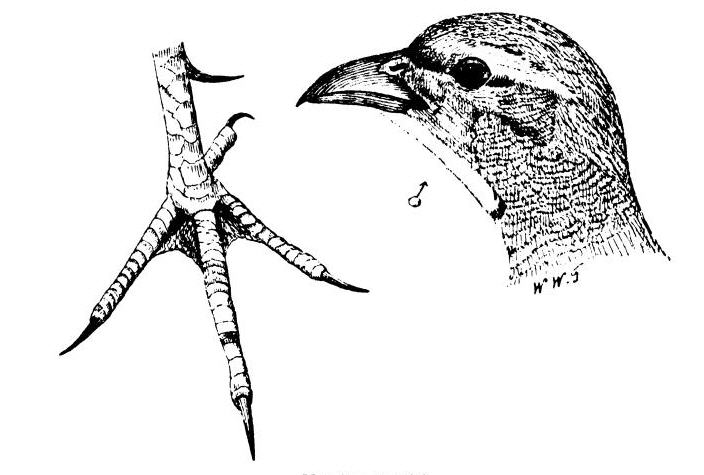
The spurs of the male, from Le Messurier, 1904

The species has long been domesticated in areas of northern Indian subcontinent, where it is used for fighting. The domesticated birds can be large, around 500-600 g, compared to 250 g for wild birds. They are usually carefully reared by hand and become as tame and confiding as a pet dog.

Several authors have described the running of the birds as being particularly graceful:

They run very swiftly and gracefully; they seem to glide rather than run, and the native lover can pay no higher compliment to his mistress than to liken her gait to that of the partridge.

— A O Hume quoted in Ogilvie-Grant

John Lockwood Kipling, Rudyard Kipling's father, wrote of this and other partridges such as the chukar partridge:

The creature follows its master with a rapid and pretty gait that suggests a graceful girl tripping along with a full skirt well held up. The Indian lover can pay his sweetheart no higher compliment than to say she runs like a partridge. In poetry the semblance is one of best hackneyed of Indian metaphors. In poetry, too, the partridge is associated with the moon, and like the lotus, is supposed to be perpetually longing for it, while the chikore is said to eat fire.

— Kipling, 1904
