= Bhogerr Mong =

Bhogarmang
- Union council and town
- Country: Pakistan
- Region: Khyber-Pakhtunkhwa
- District: Mansehra District
- Time zone: UTC+5 (PST)

Bhogarmang is a village and union council (an administrative subdivision) of Mansehra District in Khyber-Pakhtunkhwa province of Pakistan..It is majorly inhabited by Jahangiri Swatis.

- Khan Hassan Ali Khan was the First Chief of Bhogarmang(خان آف بھوگڑمنگ).
- He was succeeded by Khan Deedar Ali Khan, Bahadar Khan and Muzaffar Khan.
