= Siran Valley =

Valley in Khyber Pakhtunkhwa, Pakistan

Siran Valley وادی سرن Upper Pakhli
- Valley
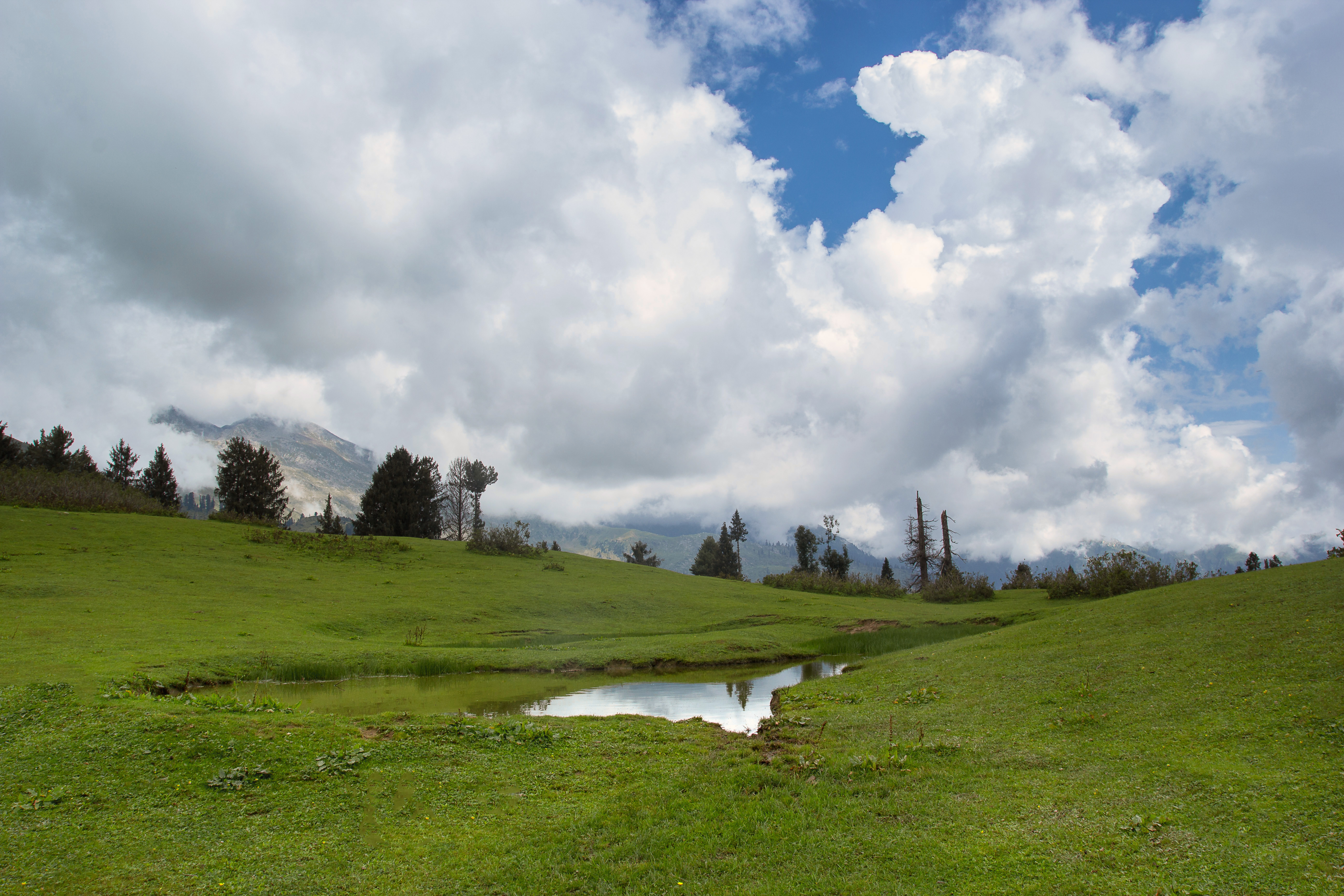
- Meadows of Kunali near Musa ka Musala in Siran Valley c. October 2015

- Location within Khyber Pakhtunkhwa Location within Pakistan
- Country: Pakistan
- Province: Khyber Pakhtunkhwa
- District: Mansehra

Government
  - MNA: Saleh Muhammad Khan Sarkheli Swati
  - MPA: Babar Saleem Jehangiri Swati
- Elevation: 2,500 m (8,200 ft)
- Time zone: UTC+5 (PST)

Siran Valley is a valley situated near the banks of the Siran River in the Pakhli region of District Mansehra, Khyber Pakhtunkhwa, Pakistan. Swati is the biggest landlord family of this valley. Siran Valley consists of many union councils, including Bhogarmang, Sacha Kalan and Jabori. According to official records, the Numberdars, Jagirdars, Khans, major politicians, and chiefs of this valley belongs to Swati tribe.

== Etymology ==
The valley gets its name from the River Siran which flows through it.

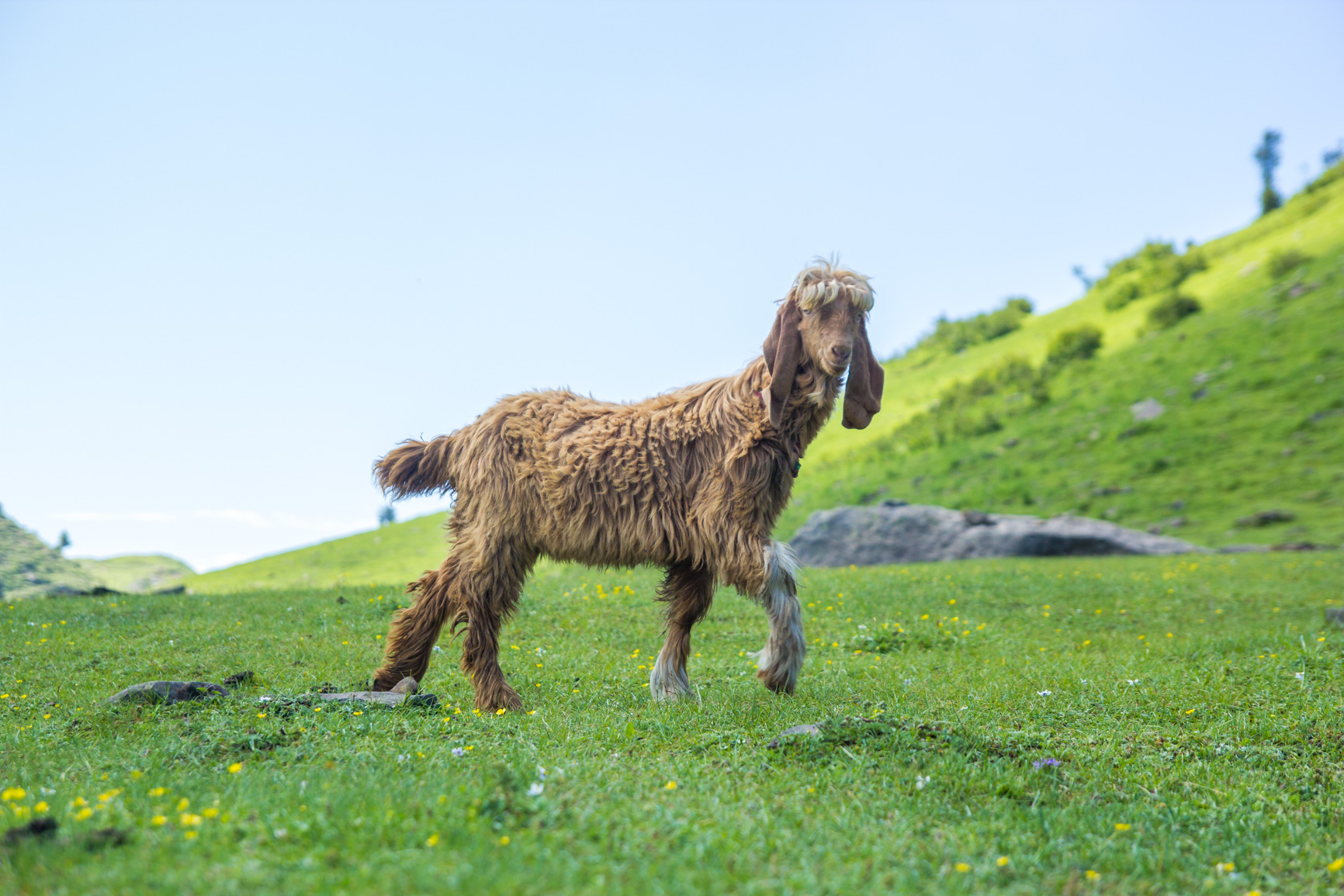
A sheep in the meadows of Pleja in Siran Valley

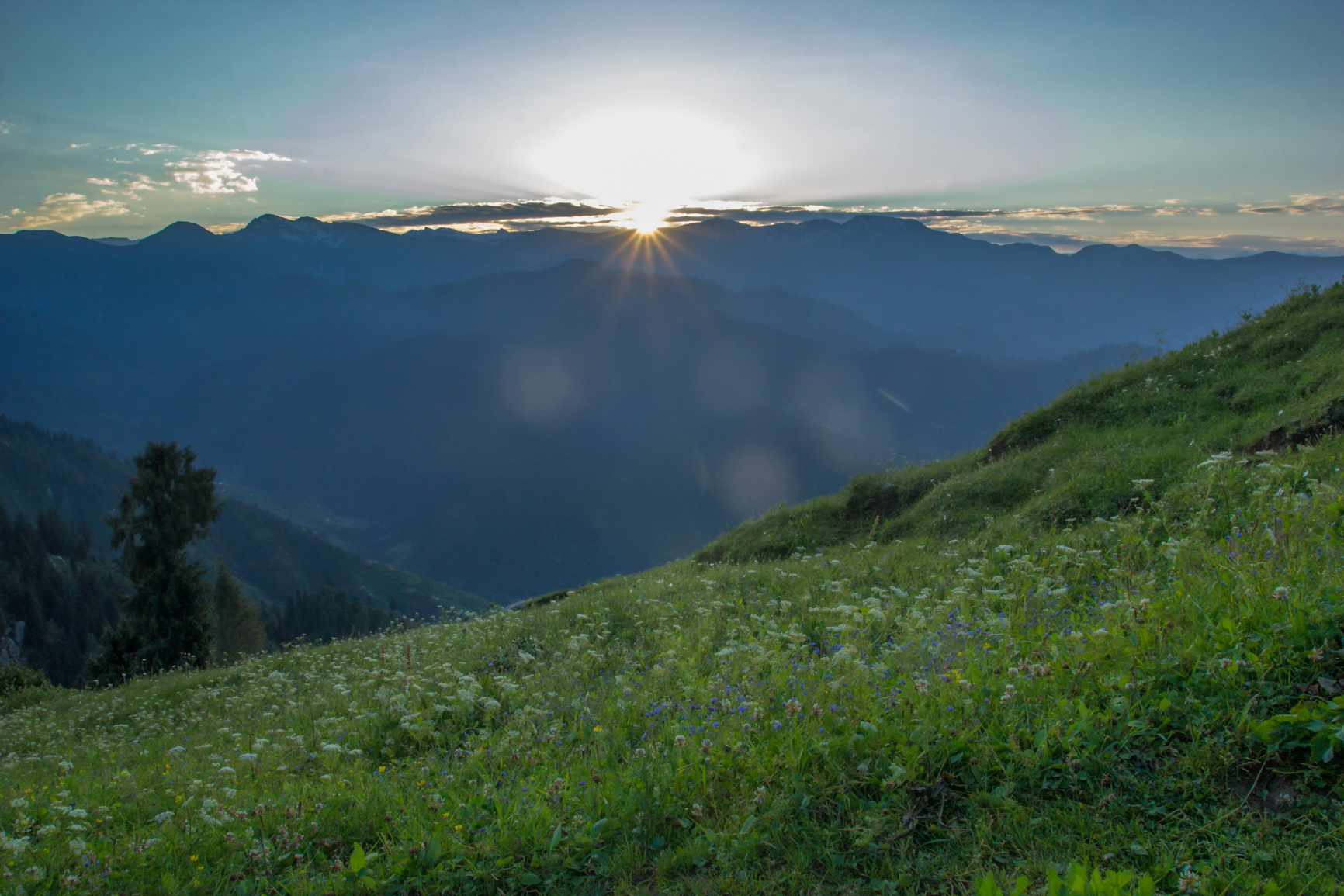
Sunrise over Musa Ka Musala

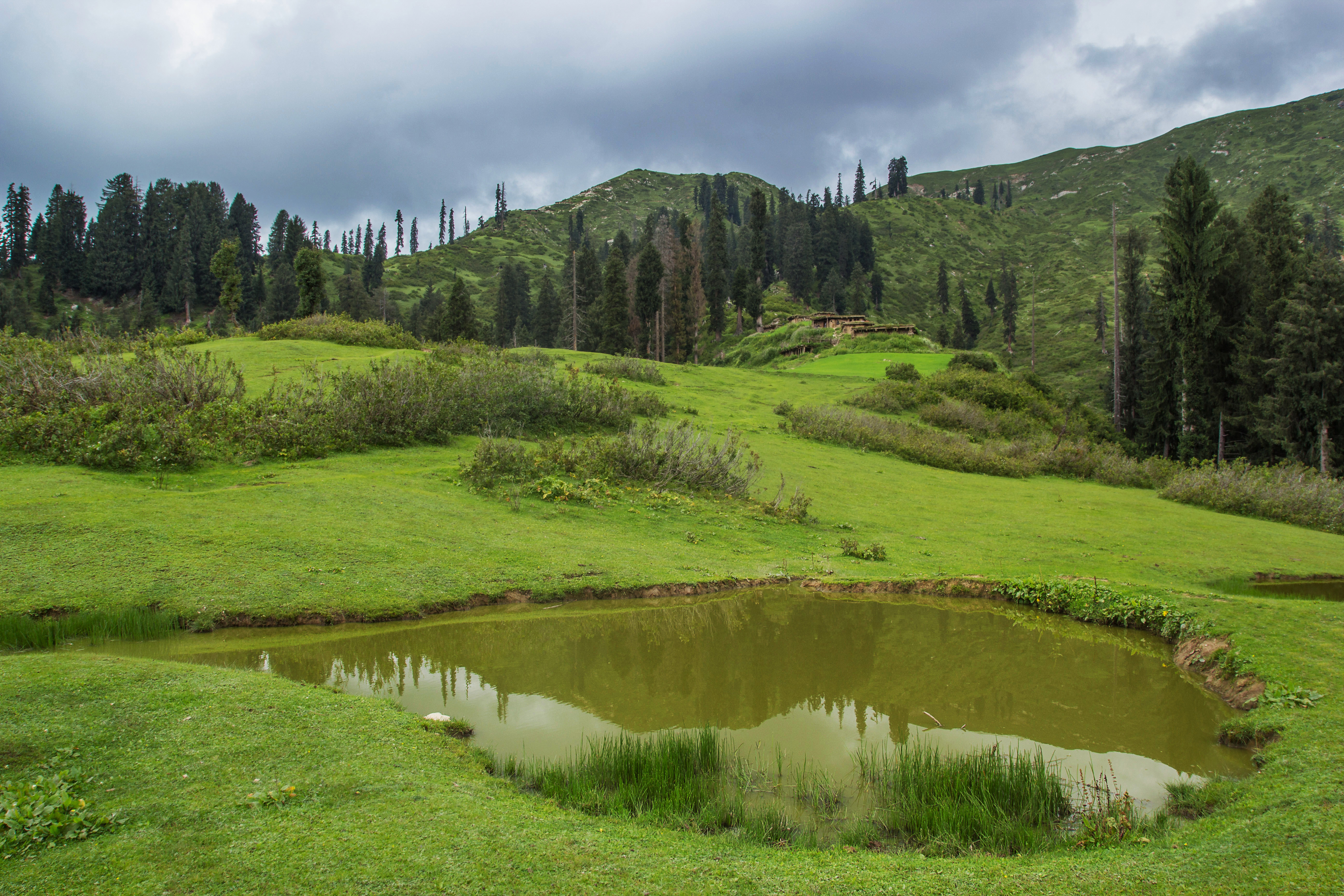
Kunali Meadows Siran Valley

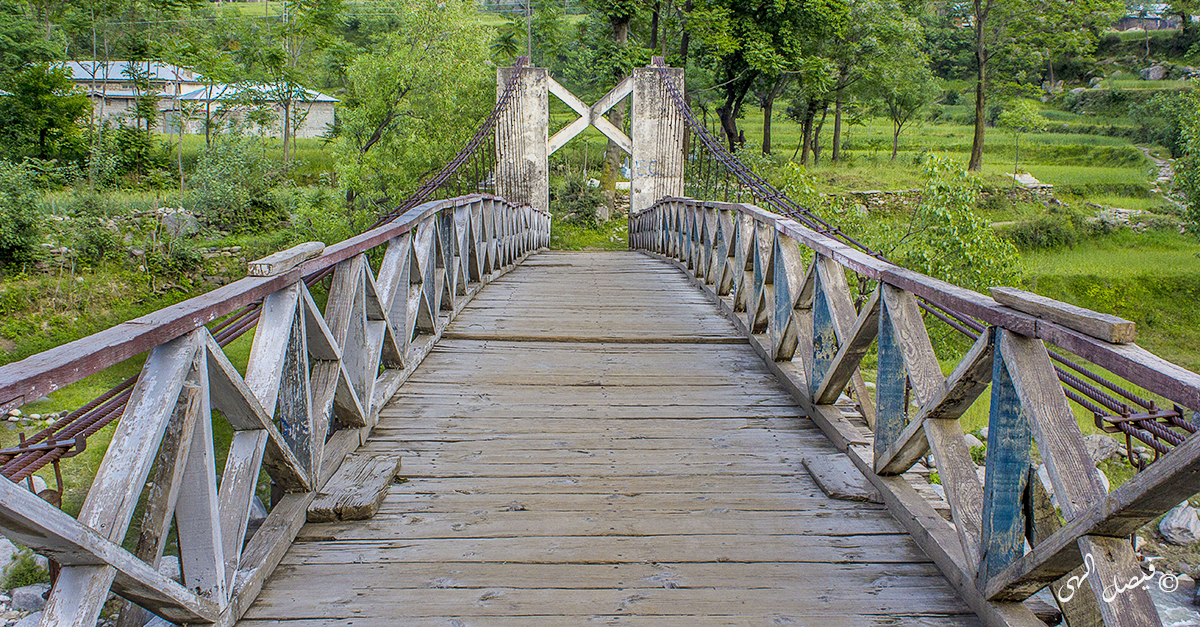
A bridge over Siran River

== Geography ==
The valley takes its name from the Siran River, which originates from the Mandagucha Glacier in the upper reaches of the valley. The river flows through the region before eventually joining the Indus River near the Tarbela Dam. The valley is situated in the Pakhli region of Mansehra District.

== Tourism ==
Siran Valley is considered one of the most beautiful valleys in Pakistan due to its natural environment, which includes snow-capped peaks, lush green meadows, and dense pine and deodar forests. The valley offers a more serene and less commercialized alternative to other tourist destinations in northern Pakistan, making it popular among hikers, nature lovers, and adventure seekers.

=== Peaks ===
The valley is surrounded by several significant peaks that are popular trekking destinations.

- Churko Peak (4,265 metres): The highest peak in Siran Valley. The trek is considered challenging and typically takes 3–4 days, passing through meadows, streams, and glacial scree slopes.
- Musa ka Musalla (4,100 meters): The second-highest peak in the valley, its name translates to the "Prayer Mat of Moses".It is considered a spiritually significant site by locals. The trek offers panoramic views of the Kohistan, Kaghan, and Kashmir regions, and on clear days, Nanga Parbat is visible.
- Khanda Peak (also known as Khunda Top, approx. 3,900 meters): A prominent conical peak located near Khunda Gali at the northern end of the valley. It is noted for its striking shape, which some observers have compared to K2.
- Sohni Sar (approx. 3,900 meters): A peak located in the Siran River's catchment area near the Allai Valley. The name means "Sohni's water pond" in the local dialect, referring to a body of water near the summit.
- Maliki Top (approx. 3,400 meters): A peak located in the Siran Valley region. The trek to Maliki Top is known for its scenic views of the surrounding valleys and forests.

=== Meadows ===
Siran Valley is dotted with numerous high-altitude alpine meadows, locally known as galis. These locations are popular for camping and offer views of the surrounding landscape.

- Baleja
- Bhishti
- Doga
- Saraan
- Khandagali – Known as the "Valley of Flowers" for its wildflowers.
- Aram Gali – A meadow situated at approximately 3,350 meters.
- Darwaza ali
- Mundi – A scenic sub-valley that serves as a base for treks.
- Dalyar Top

=== Forests ===
The valley contains some of the oldest and densest forests in the region, composed of species such as deodar, blue pine, oak, and fir. These forests are home to diverse wildlife, including bird species like the Himalayan monal and golden eagle.

- Jacha
- Shaheed Pani
- Mandagucha
- Dhor
- Kundbangla
- Sathan Gali

=== Munro Hiking Trail ===
An old route, the Munro Hiking Trail, was re-opened in 2022 to promote adventure tourism. The 66-kilometer trail was originally developed between 1900 and 1905 by A.V. Munro, a British forest conservator. It starts at Kund Bangla (at an altitude of 2,250 meters) and winds through the mountainous region between the Siran and Kaghan Valleys, ending at Kamal Ban in the Naran Valley. The trail passes through forests, meadows, and historic rest houses, including those at Shaheed Pani.

== See also ==
- Musa ka Musala
- Kaghan Valley
