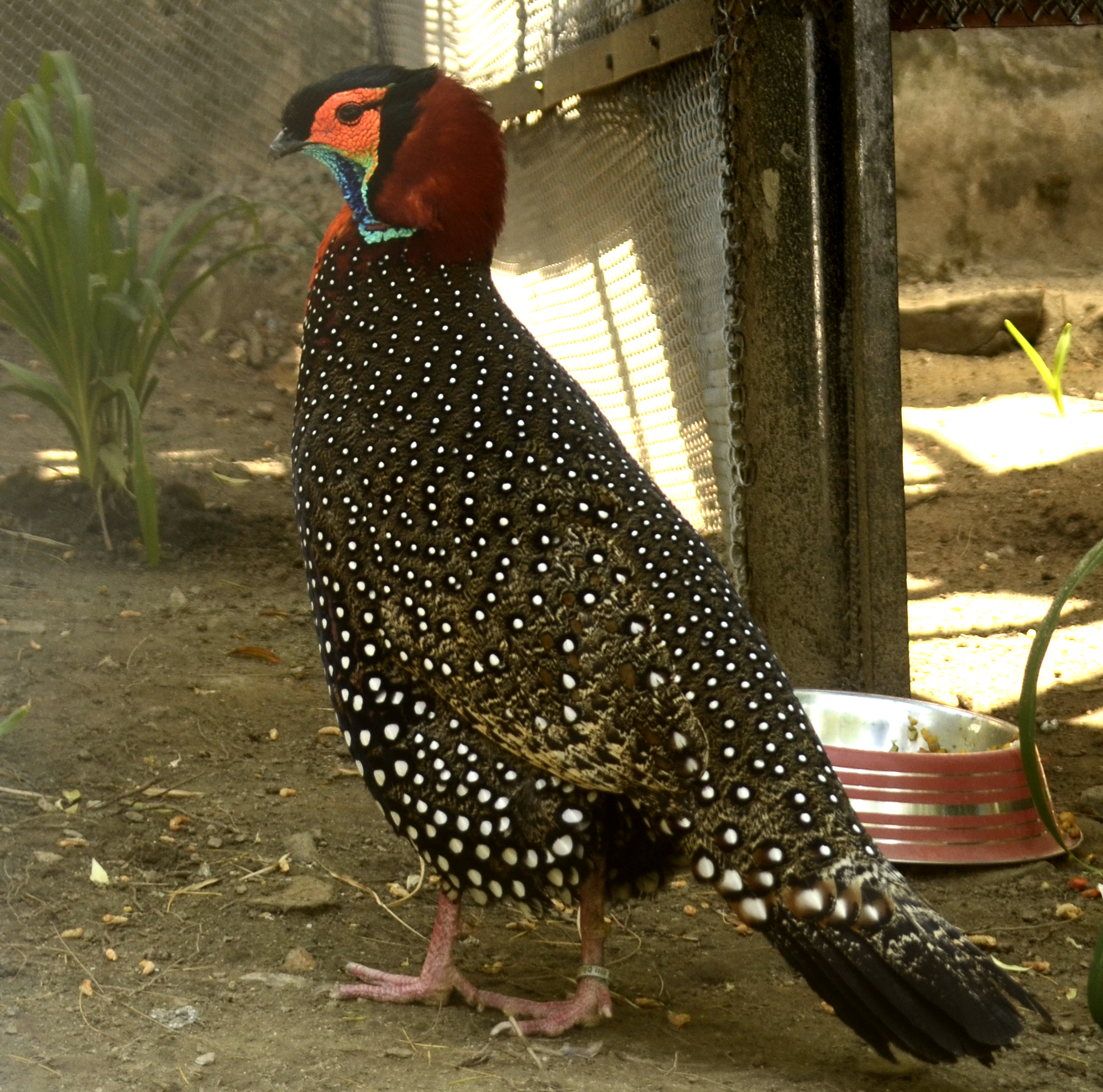

Conservation status
- Vulnerable (IUCN 3.1)
- CITES Appendix I

Scientific classification
- Kingdom: Animalia
- Phylum: Chordata
- Class: Aves
- Order: Galliformes
- Family: Phasianidae
- Genus: Tragopan
- Species: T. melanocephalus

Binomial name
- Tragopan melanocephalus (Gray, JE, 1829)
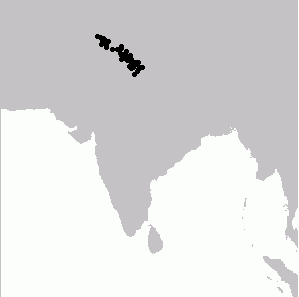

= Western tragopan =

Species of bird

The western tragopan or western horned tragopan (Tragopan melanocephalus) is a medium-sized brightly plumed landfowl found along the range of Western Himalayas from north-eastern districts of Khyber Pakhtunkhwa province in northern Pakistan in the west to Uttarakhand within India to the east. The species is highly endangered and globally threatened.

== Identification ==
The male is very dark, grey and black with numerous white spots, each spot bordered with black and deep crimson patches on the sides and back of the neck. The throat is bare with blue skin while the bare facial skin is red. They have a small black occipital crest. Females have pale brownish-grey upper parts finely vermiculated and spotted with black, and most of the feathers have black patches and central white streaks. Immature males resemble females, but are larger with longer legs and a variable amount of black on the head and red on neck.

Males weigh 1.8–2.2 kg (4.0–4.9 lb) and females weigh 1.25–1.4 kg (2.8–3.1 lb). The males vary in length from 55–60 cm (22–24 in) while the females are 48–50 cm (19–20 in).

== Distribution ==
Five populations are known from Kohistan and Kaghan valley in Pakistan and from Kishtwar, Chamba and Kullu districts of India as well as from an area east of the Satluj river in India. They are found from an altitude of 1,750 to 3,600 m, going higher in summer. Their preferred habitat is the dense understorey of temperate, subalpine and broad-leaved forest.

== Habitats ==
It inhabits upper temperate forests between 2,400 and 3,600 m in summer, and in winter, dense coniferous and broad-leaved forests between 2,000 and 2,800 m elevations. The western tragopan is mostly arboreal but feeds on the ground. They feed mostly on leaves, shoots and seeds, but also consume insects and other invertebrates. Like most pheasants, they roost in trees singly or in pairs except during nesting.

During display, the males show the throat inflated into lappets that appear purple with pink margins. They also display blue horns with a fancied resemblance to those of the Greek mythological god Pan, whence the name tragopan (tragos "goat" + Pan). During the display they call and the song is a loud two-note ringing wou-weee which is repeated every second for long periods. The breeding season is May and June. They build their nests in low tree hollows.

They are sensitive to anthropogenic disturbance and avoid disturbed habitats (for instance, hydro-electric project development sites).

== Status ==
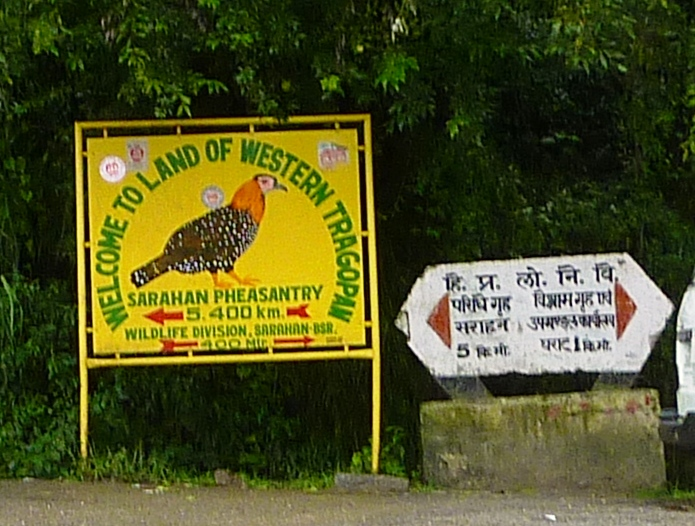
Sign about Western tragopans near Sarahan, Himachal Pradesh, India

The western tragopan is considered as one of the rarest living landfowl. Its range is very restricted. In the Kashmir valley, it is known as daangeer, in Chamba as phulgar and in the Kullu valley as jujurana ("king of birds"). It was accorded the status of state bird of Himachal Pradesh in 2007.

The population of the western tragopan is threatened by several anthropogenic factors throughout its range. The world population is estimated at fewer than 5,000 individuals, including a captive breeding population in Himachal Pradesh which numbered fewer than ten pairs in 2012. CITES has listed this species in Appendix I in order to discourage selling of its feathers. Representing the endemic bird area D02 of Western Himalaya, the western tragopan has been described as a range-restricted species.

== Gallery ==
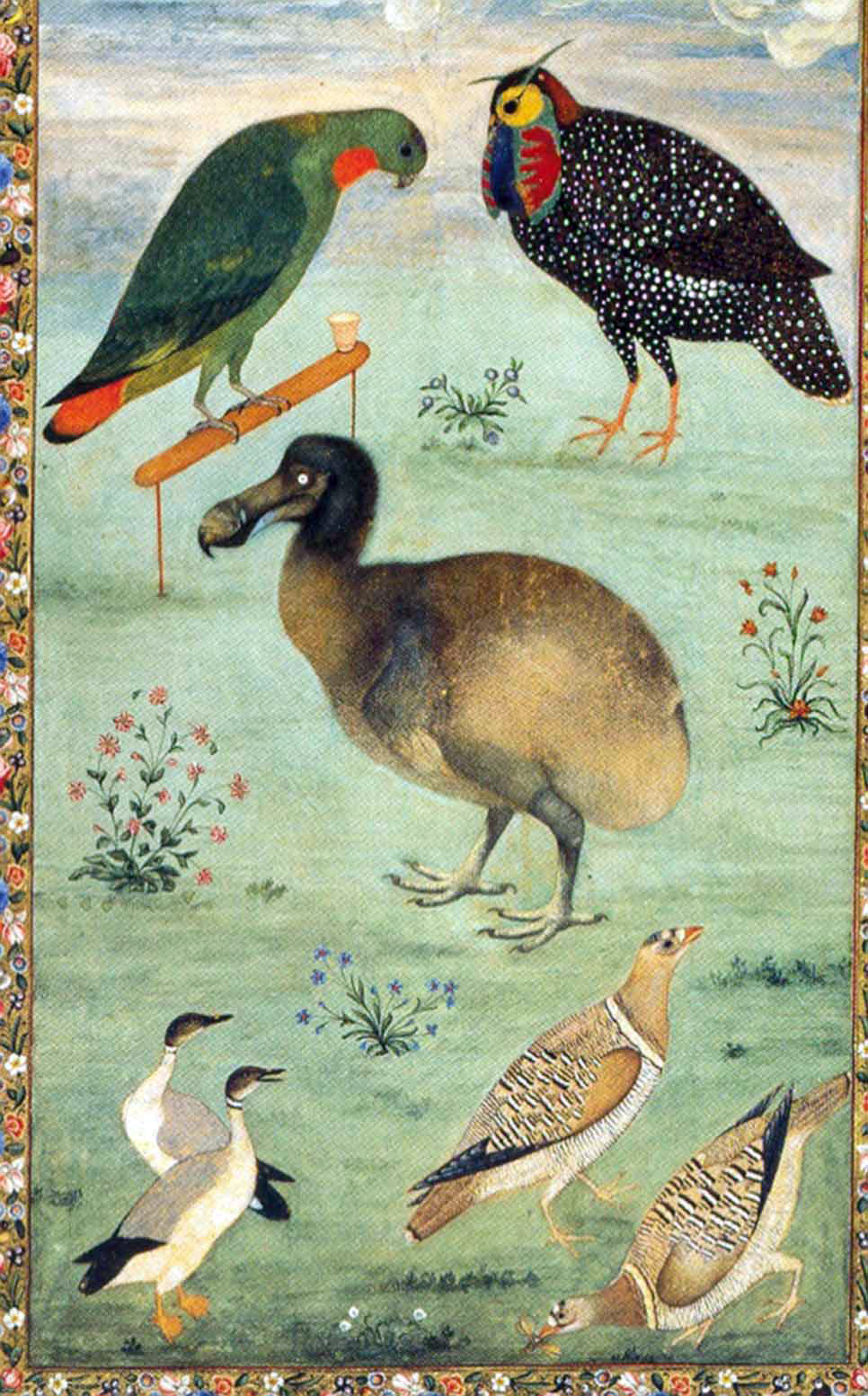
by Ustad Mansur 1625

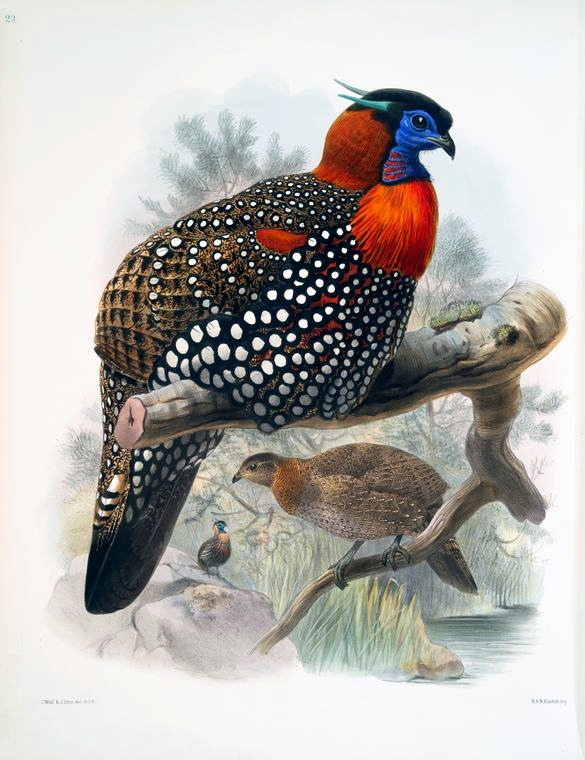
by D G Elliot 1872
