= Konsh Valley =

Valley in Mansehra, Pakistan

Coordinates: 34.58°N 73.15°E

Konsh valley is located on the northern border of the Mansehra district, Khyber Pakhtunkhwa, Pakistan. The town of Battal is the headquarters of the valley. The Silk Route, also known as the Karakoram highway, passes through the valley, leading to Gilgit. Towns, like Battal, and structures in the area, were severely damaged by the 2005 Kashmir earthquake. The altitude varies from 1067 meters at Ichhrian to 2911 meters at Bahishti Sar. The valley is inhabited by more than 76,000 people, made up of three main tribes: Sayyed, Swati, Gujjars. Major part of land is owned by Swati tribe. For better prospects, Akazais (Yousafzai Pathans) migrated to the adjoining area. The Aziz Khel clan of Akazais, people who migrated from Tor Ghar are now living in Konsh Valley village Chinarkot, UC Ichhrian, Tehsil Baffa, Mansehra district.
