= Hazara University =

Public university in Khyber Pakhtunkhwa, Pakistan

- ہزارہ یونیورسٹی مانسہرہ
- Other name: HU
- Motto: Get Knowledge
- Type: Public
- Established: 10-10-2001
- Accreditation: Higher Education Commission (Pakistan), Pharmacy Council of Pakistan
- Chancellor: Chief Minister, Khyber Pakhtunkhwa
- Vice-Chancellor: Prof. Dr. Ikramullah Khan
- Location: Mansehra, Khyber Pakhtunkhwa, Pakistan; 34°25′12″N 73°15′0″E
- Campus: 250 acres (100 ha)
- Language: English
- Colors
- Website: hu.edu.pk

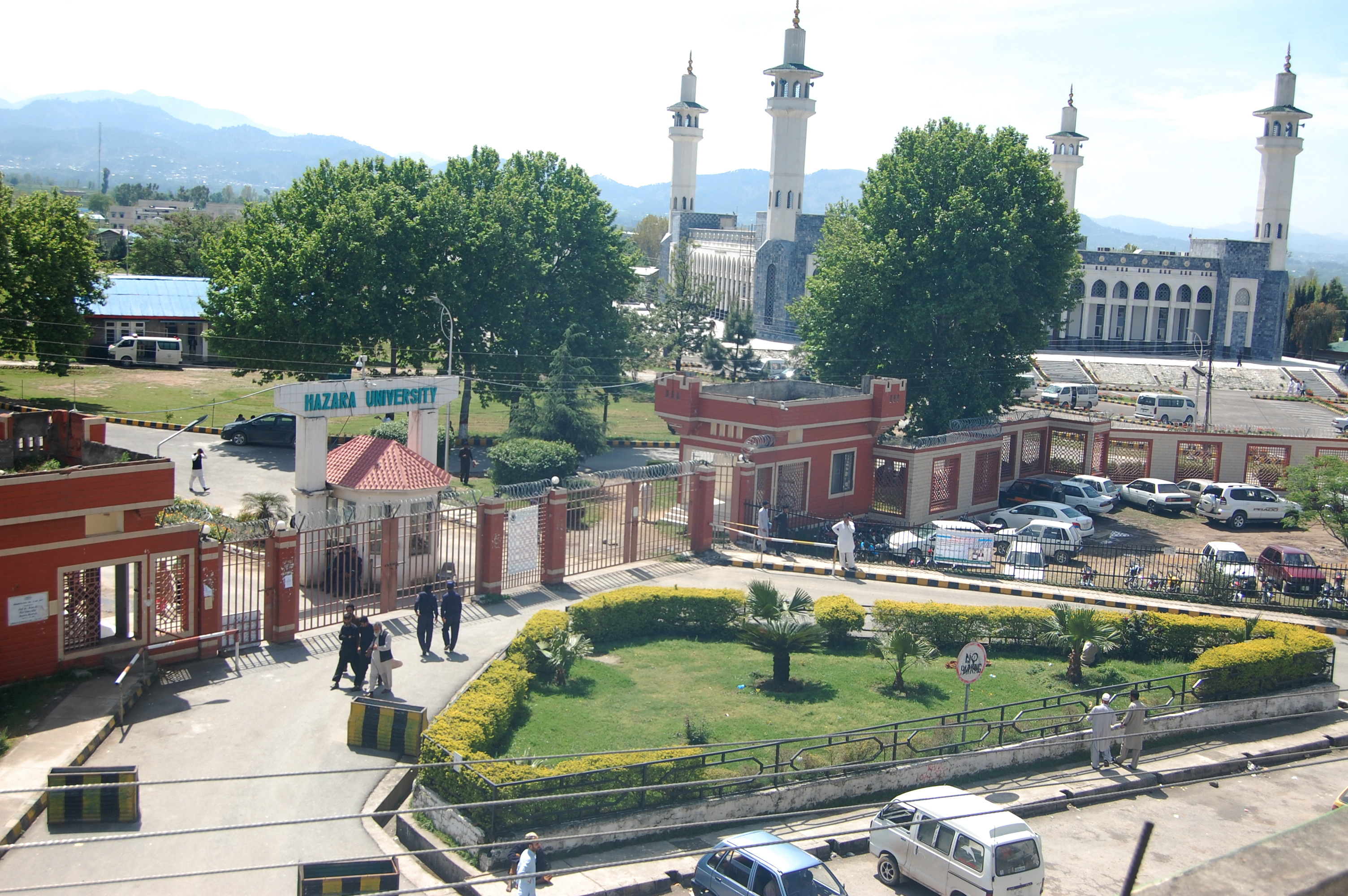
Hazara University, Mansehra Pakistan

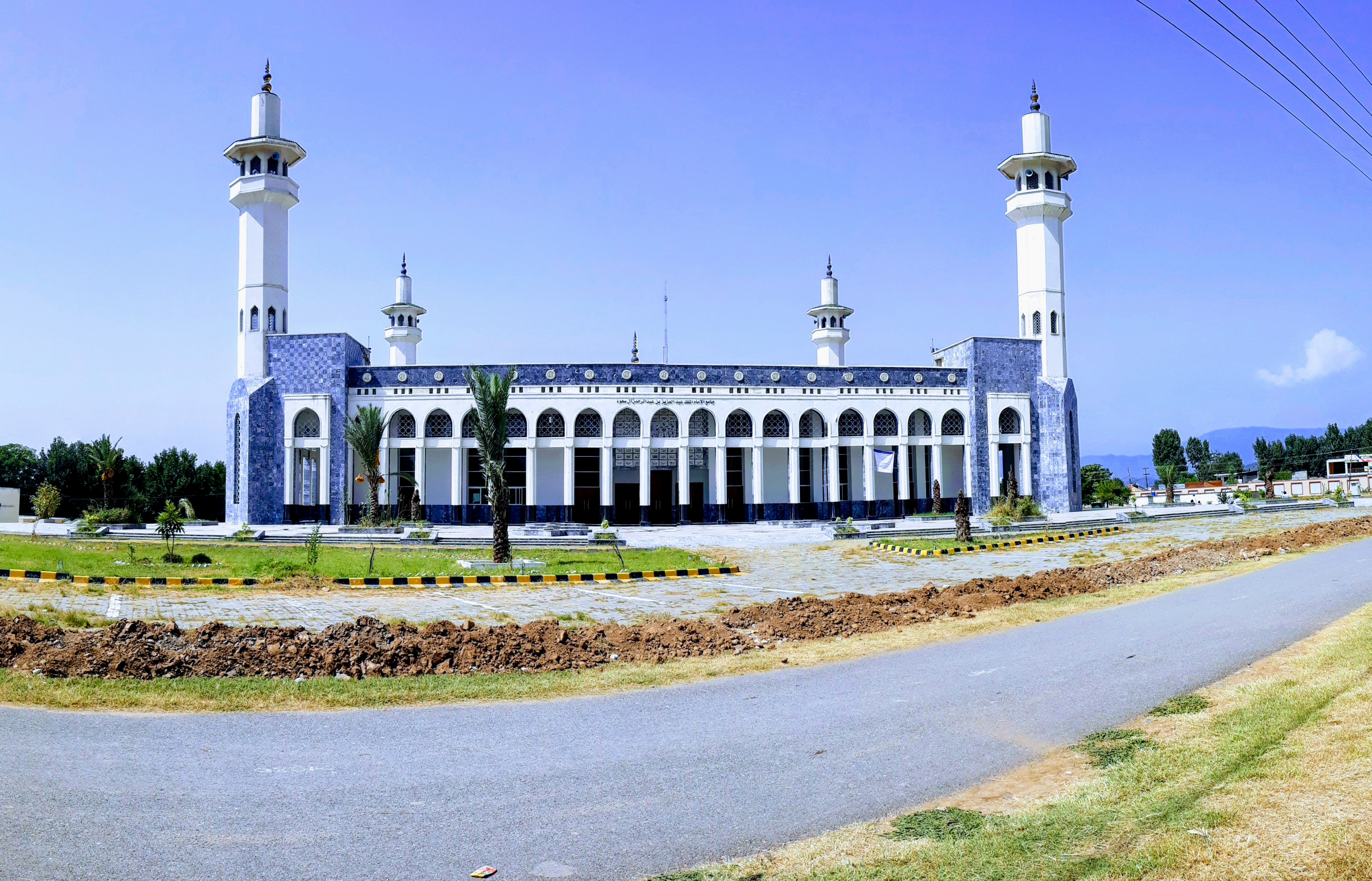
Hazara University Mosque

The Hazara University (HU) is a public university located in Mansehra, Pakistan.

== Recognized university ==
Hazara University is recognized as a higher education institution by the Higher Education Commission of Pakistan.

== Overview ==
The campus is situated at the crossroads of the ancient civilization of Gandhara and Ashoka and faces the silk route on the outskirts of Mansehra which had been the ancient link between the sub-continent, China and Central Asia.

Haji Abdul Hanan Khan Swati, a prominent landowner in Dhodial, generously contributed land for the establishment of the mental hospital in Mansehra. This hospital was built by the first health minister of Pakistan Khan Khudadad Khan Swati and eventually transformed into Hazara University.

== Faculties and Departments ==
=== Faculty of Arts & Humanities ===
- Department of Archaeology
- Department of Architecture
- Department of Art & Design
- Department of Media & Communication Studies
- Department of Education
- Department of English
- Department of Pakistan Studies
- Department of Tourism & Hospitality
- Department of Urdu

=== Faculty of Biological & Health Sciences ===
- Department of Agriculture
- Department of Biochemistry
- Department of Biotechnology & Genetic Engineering
- Department of Botany
- Department of Microbiology
- Department of Pharmacy
- Department of Zoology

=== Faculty of Law & Social Sciences ===
- Department of Economics
- Department of Islamic & Religious Studies
- Department of Law
- Department of Management Sciences
- Department of Political Science
- Department of Psychology
- Department of Public Policy & Administration
- Department of Sociology

=== Faculty of Natural & Computational Sciences ===
- Department of Bioinformatics
- Department of Chemistry
- Department of Computer Science & Information Technology
- Department of Earth & Environmental Sciences
- Department of Mathematics & Statistics
- Department of Physics
- Department of Telecommunication

This university offers Bachelor, Master, MPhil and PhD Programs.
