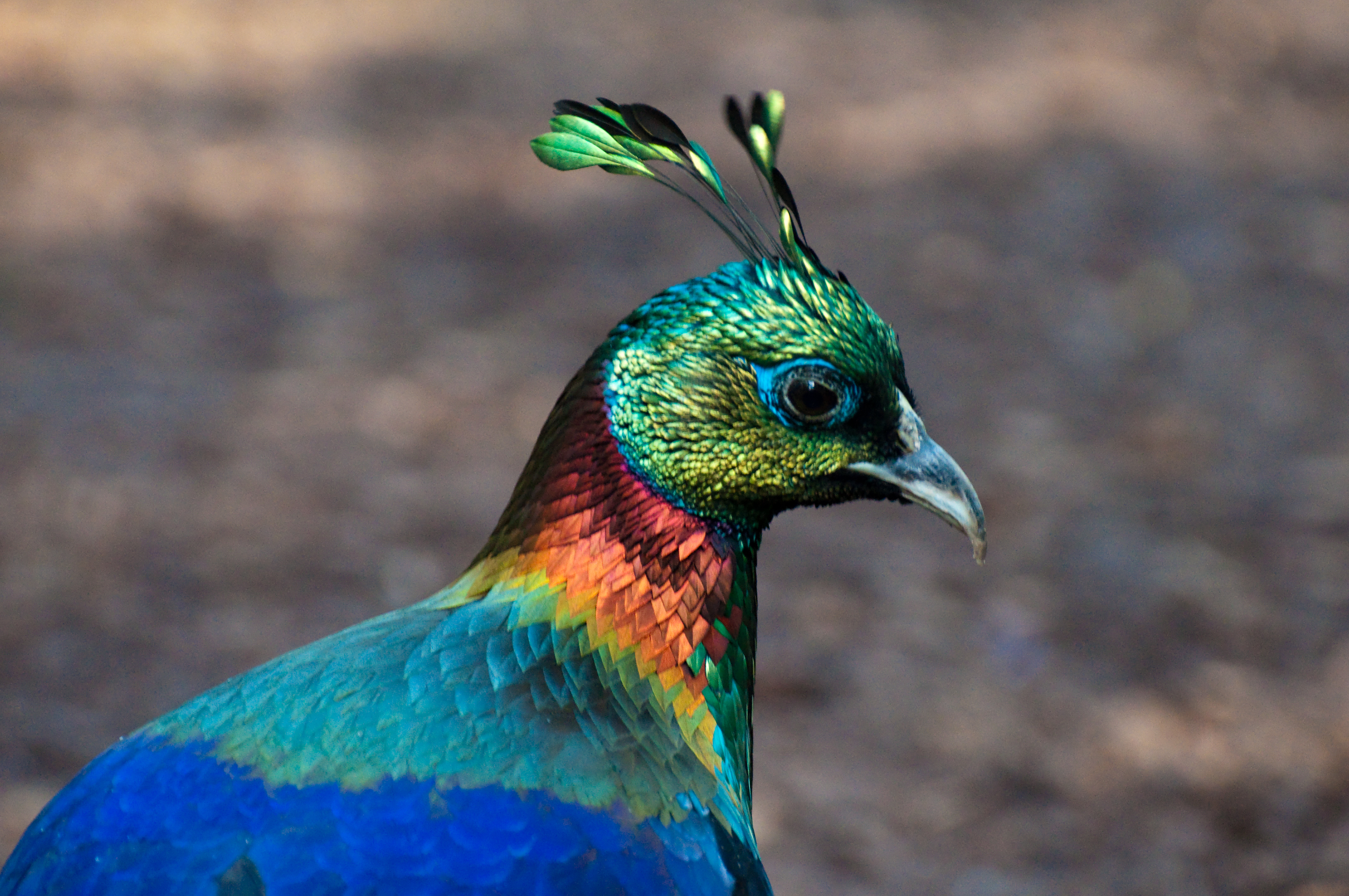
- Himalayan monal (Lophophorus impejanus)

Scientific classification
- Kingdom: Animalia
- Phylum: Chordata
- Class: Aves
- Order: Galliformes
- Family: Phasianidae
- Subfamily: Phasianinae
- Tribe: Lophophorini; Gray, 1841

Genera
- Tragopan; Tetraophasis; Lophophorus

= Lophophorini =

Tribe of birds

Lophophorini is a tribe of bird in the subfamily Phasianinae. It contains three genera of landfowl found throughout Asia. This grouping was supported by a 2021 phylogenetic analysis of Galliformes, and accepted by the International Ornithological Congress. The tribe name is accepted by the Howard and Moore Complete Checklist of the Birds of the World.

== Species ==
Image	Genus	Living species
	Tragopan, tragopans	Western tragopan, Tragopan melanocephalus; Satyr tragopan, Tragopan satyra; Blyth's tragopan, Tragopan blythii; Temminck's tragopan, Tragopan temminckii; Cabot's tragopan, Tragopan caboti
	Tetraophasis, monal-partridges	Verreaux's monal-partridge, Tetraophasis obscurus; Szechenyi's monal-partridge, Tetraophasis szechenyii
	Lophophorus, monals	Himalayan monal, Lophophorus impejanus; Sclater's monal, Lophophorus sclateri; Chinese monal, Lophophorus lhuysii
