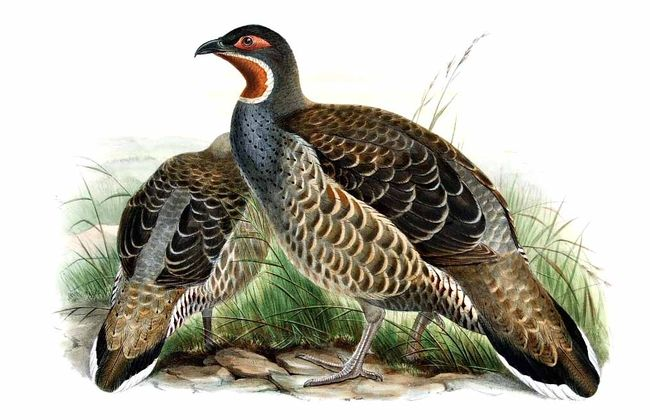
- Tetraophasis obscurus

Scientific classification
- Kingdom: Animalia
- Phylum: Chordata
- Class: Aves
- Order: Galliformes
- Family: Phasianidae
- Tribe: Lophophorini
- Genus: Tetraophasis; Elliot, 1871

Type species
- Perdix obscurus

= Tetraophasis =

Genus of birds

Tetraophasis is a genus of Galliformes in the family Phasianidae, which includes chickens, pheasants, partridges, grouse, turkeys, quail, and peafowl. It contains the following species:

- Chestnut-throated monal-partridge or Verreaux's monal-partridge (Tetraophasis obscurus)
- Buff-throated monal-partridge or Szechenyi's monal-partridge (Tetraophasis szechenyii)

The name Tetraophasis is a combination of the genus name Tetrao (the name Carl Linnaeus gave grouse in 1758), and the modern Latin word phasis, meaning "pheasant". Monal-partridge are close relatives of monals and more distantly related to tragopan. They are boreal adapted species of high altitudes. Like monals they dig in alpine biomes for tubers, rhizomes and invertebrates as well as rodent pups and voles. Monal-partridges are important prey species for raptors, owls and yellow-throated martens. Like monals, monal-partridges are strictly monogamous. The female incubates the eggs until the last 48, hours when the male may take over the nighttime nest brooding. This is a habit documented in blood pheasants, tragopans and monals.

Both sexes rear the chicks, which are not fully mature until their second year. Unlike monals the sexes do not separate during winter.

Monal-partridges are strong fliers. They evidently compete with koklass as the two are rarely to be heard or seen in the same valleys.
