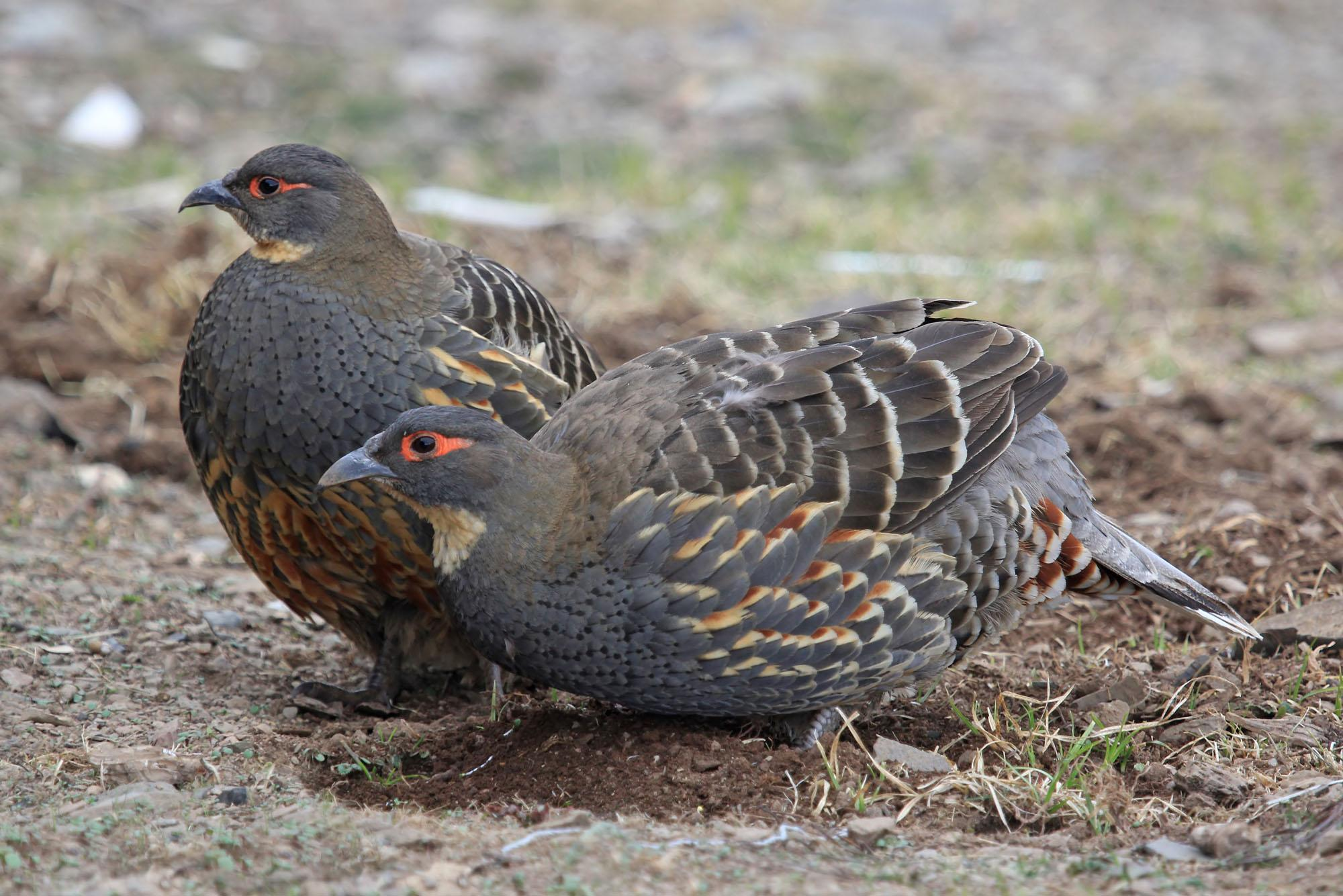

Conservation status
- Least Concern (IUCN 3.1)

Scientific classification
- Kingdom: Animalia
- Phylum: Chordata
- Class: Aves
- Order: Galliformes
- Family: Phasianidae
- Genus: Tetraophasis
- Species: T. szechenyii

Binomial name
- Tetraophasis szechenyii Madarász, 1885
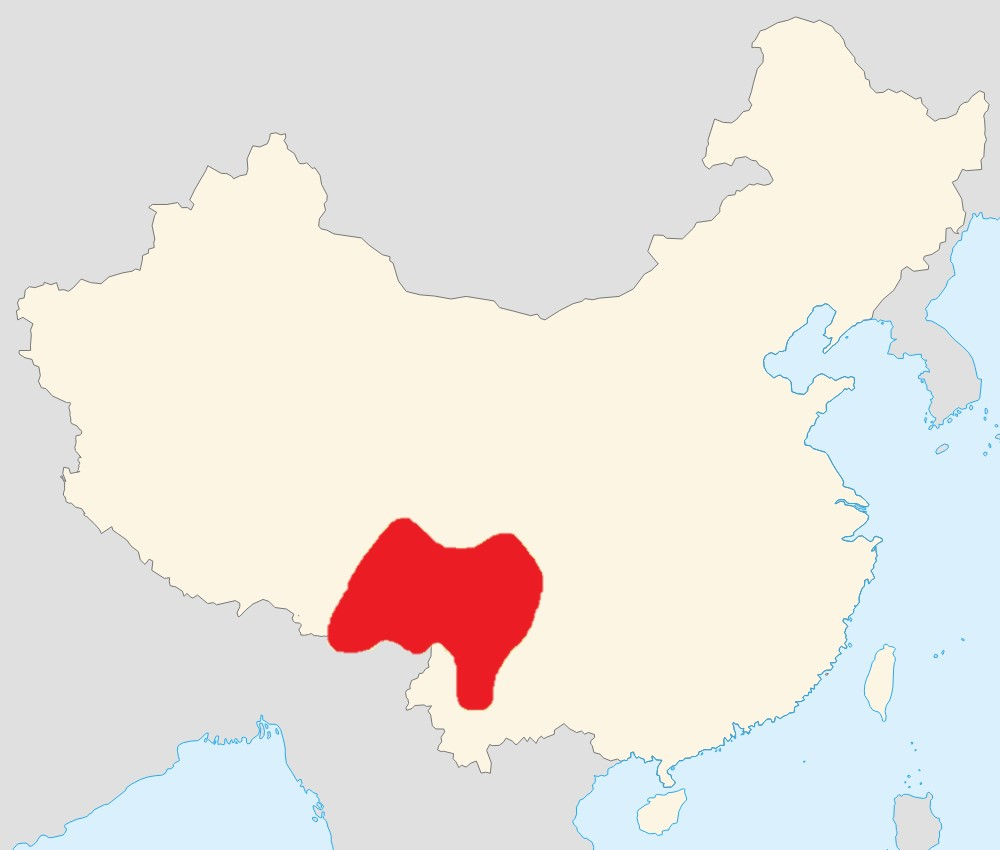

= Buff-throated monal-partridge =

Species of bird

Buff-throated monal-partridge (Tetraophasis szechenyii), also known as buff-throated partridge or Szechenyi's monal-partridge, is a member of the family Phasianidae in the order Galliformes. It is endemic to western China.

== Taxonomy ==
The Latin binomial commemorates Béla Széchenyi, a Hungarian explorer. Complete mitochondrial genome sequencing of the species places the buff-throated monal-partridge in the genus Tetraophasis in the family Phasianidae. Phylogenetic positioning of the Tetraophasis has been understudied, though there is strong support that it and genus Lophophorus are sister genera, forming a subclade with Tragopan.

== Description ==
The buff-throated monal-partridge is a sexually monochromatic, medium-sized species of partridge. It has a distinct orange horizontal teardrop shaped eye ring, a light gold gorget, as well as a crest that it can occasionally flare up. The species has a grey upper chest and speckled orange and grey belly. They are usually 29–50 cm in length and weigh between 660-1790g.

== Distribution and habitat ==
The buff-throated monal-partridge is endemic to the high mountains (3350–4600 m) of western China, and is distributed in southeastern Tibet, southern Qinghai, western Sichuan and northwestern Yunnan. These birds mainly live in mixed coniferous forest, rhododendron shrubs, oak thickets, alpine meadows, and rocky ravines. The buff-throated monal-partridge is susceptible to a variety of both avian and mammalian predators around the area. Potential nocturnal avian predators include Père David's owl (Strix davidi) and tawny owls (Strix aluco). Mammalian predators include leopard cats (Prionailurus bengalensis), Siberian weasels (Mustela sibirica) and mountain weasels (Mustela altaica).

== Behavior ==
=== Food and feeding ===
The buff-throated monal-partridge's diet consists mainly of leaves, roots, stems, bulbs, fruits and seeds of various herbs and scrubs, as well as some moss and in some areas near local monasteries, the residing monks sometimes feed them rice and corn. Supplementary feeding from the monks on the Tibetan sacred site have shown beneficial effects for these partridges. Fed breeding groups experienced earlier laid first clutches, increasing their opportunity to re-nest in case of failed clutches, as well as increased clutch and egg sizes compared against non-fed groups. Groups who finish breeding season early have more time to molt and recover fat reserves before winter, giving them a greater chance of survival during the harsher months.

=== Breeding ===
The buff-throated monal-partridgee is one of the few galliformes that participate in cooperative breeding, and breed from April to June. Surveys suggest that these partridges are monogamous or polygynous. A single family unit consists of a main breeding pair, and can often have one to three typically male helpers, though they can be female, that will aid in protecting territory. The partridges usually nest in scrapes in the soil lined with leaves, sticks and bark at the base of a tree or scrub. The breeding female normally lays 3-4 eggs and are incubated for about four weeks. During incubation, the breeding female will incubate eggs exclusively away from the rest of the group, while the breeding male and helpers will either spend their time foraging or guarding the area around the nest. After the eggs hatch, all members of the family unit, including the newly hatched precocial chicks, will forage together during the day, but the breeding female and chicks will still keep their distance until they are over 15 days old. All adult members experience brooding, vigilance, and territorial behavior, with the helpers focusing especially on fighting during territorial display after the chicks hatch, defending their territory from helpers in rival family units. Breeding males rarely display fighting behavior and females will never participate in fighting. These family groups remain stable during the breeding season, and exhibit low rates of individual disappearance. Individual disappearance increase during the winter, but are most frequent among the young.

=== Roosting ===
The buff-throated monal-partridge not only participate in cooperative breeding, but they also engage in communal roosting at night for the benefits of reduced thermoregulatory costs and decreased predation risk. Before sunset, the family unit will move slowly and quietly to their roost sites. Once they arrive at the roosting site, usually a large fir tree, some members remain on the lookout while others preen their feathers. As sunset approaches, the birds will bob their necks as they prepare for their ascent. Barring the incubation period and the first couple weeks after the eggs hatch where the breeding pair stays separated, the partridges will roost together in linear huddles on a single branch close to the tree trunk usually up 7m high. Females with chicks will usually wait for more than 15 days before joining the males in the huddle, since it is difficult for chicks to fly up into the tree. Females and their chicks will instead brood under dense undergrowth until they are ready to fly up to the branches. Due to the nature of a linear huddle, the communal roosting benefits are unlikely to be acquired equally by all birds. The breeding male is usually the first to enter the roosting tree, with the helpers going up last, occupying the outermost positions. Females never have a consistent timing with entering the roost. The partridges will always enter the roost one by one, never simultaneously. Once the chicks are ready to join the roost, they are squeezed into the middle, where it is the warmest and safest. Once settled in their selected positions in the linear huddle, they will face downward and hold that position until morning unless the birds are disturbed, in which case they abandon the roost by gliding away. When temperatures drop, in order to minimize heat loss, Szechenyi's monal-partridges will perch earlier and depart from the roost later in the day. They may also reduce their general level of activity as well on colder days. These birds will generally gather the minimum amount of resources needed to survive overnight, and save energy by remaining inactive for a longer amount of time.

== Conservation status ==
Even though this species is in the Least Concern category by the current IUCN Red List; under the Red Book of China, it is currently considered as endangered and listed in Category I of the nationally protected animals. With Sichuan and Yunnan rapidly modernizing since the mid 70s, deforestation needs to be studied as a potential threat to this species. Logging companies have been clearing large areas of natural forest, with most of the trees being firs and spruce firs, which act as roosting sites for the Szechenyi's monal-partridge. In order to focus on conservation efforts for the Szechenyi's monal-partridge, more information on the species' ecology and habitat use is needed. This information is fundamental to determine its conservation status.
