= List of Indian state birds =

India, officially the Republic of India is a country in South Asia, consisting of 28 states and eight union territories. All Indian states and some of the union territories have their own elected government and the union territories come under the jurisdiction of the Central Government. India has its own national symbols. Apart from the national symbols, the states and union territories have adopted their own seals and symbols including birds listed below.

== States ==
List of Indian state birds
State	Common name	Binomial name	Image	IUCN category
Andhra Pradesh	Rose-ringed parakeet	Psittacula krameri		Least Concern
Arunachal Pradesh	Great hornbill	Buceros bicornis		Vulnerable
Assam	White-winged wood duck	Asarcornis scutulata		Endangered
Bihar	House sparrow	Passer domesticus		Least Concern
Chhattisgarh	Hill myna	Gracula religiosa		Least Concern
Goa	Flame-throated bulbul	Pycnonotus gularis		Least Concern
Gujarat	Greater flamingo	Phoenicopterus roseus		Least Concern
Haryana	Black francolin	Francolinus francolinus		Least Concern
Himachal Pradesh	Western tragopan	Tragopan melanocephalus		Vulnerable
Jharkhand	Asian Koel	Eudynamys scolopacea		Least Concern
Karnataka	Indian roller	Coracias benghalensis		Least Concern
Kerala	Great hornbill	Buceros bicornis		Vulnerable
Madhya Pradesh	Indian paradise flycatcher	Terpsiphone paradisi		Least Concern
Maharashtra	Yellow-footed green pigeon	Treron phoenicoptera		Least Concern
Manipur	Mrs. Hume's pheasant	Syrmaticus humiae		Vulnerable
Meghalaya	Hill myna	Gracula religiosa		Least Concern
Mizoram	Mrs. Hume's pheasant	Syrmaticus humiae		Vulnerable
Nagaland	Blyth's tragopan	Tragopan blythii		Vulnerable
Odisha	Indian roller	Coracias benghalensis		Least Concern
Punjab	Northern goshawk	Accipiter gentilis		Least Concern
Rajasthan	Great Indian bustard	Ardeotis nigriceps		Critically Endangered
Sikkim	Blood pheasant	Ithaginis cruentus		Least Concern
Tamil Nadu	emerald dove	Chalcophaps indica		Least Concern
Telangana	Indian roller	Coracias benghalensis		Least Concern
Tripura	Green imperial pigeon	Ducula aenea		Least Concern
Uttar Pradesh	Sarus crane	Grus antigone		Vulnerable
Uttarakhand	Himalayan monal	Lophophorus impejanus		Least Concern
West Bengal	White-throated kingfisher	Halcyon smyrnensis		Least Concern

== Union territories ==
List of Indian state birds (Union territories)
Union territory	Common name	Binomial name	Image	IUCN category
Andaman and Nicobar Islands	Andaman wood pigeon	Columba palumboides		Near Threatened
Chandigarh	Indian grey hornbill	Ocyceros birostris		Least Concern
Delhi	House Sparrow	Passer domesticus		Least Concern
Jammu and Kashmir	Kalij pheasant	Lophura leucomelanos	Kalij pheasant Prasanna Mamidala	Least Concern
Ladakh	Black-necked crane	Grus nigricollis		Near Threatened
Lakshadweep	Brown noddy	Anous stolidus		Least Concern
Puducherry	Asian koel	Eudynamys scolopaceus		Least Concern
