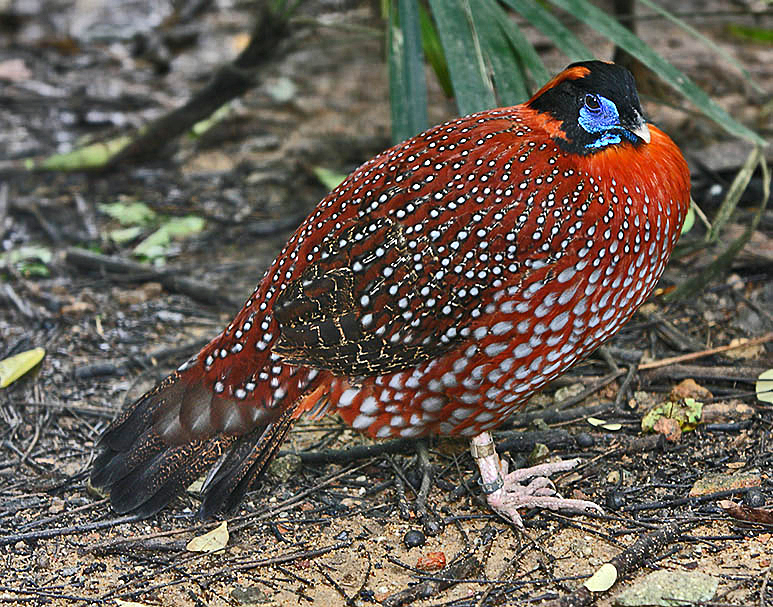
- Adult Male
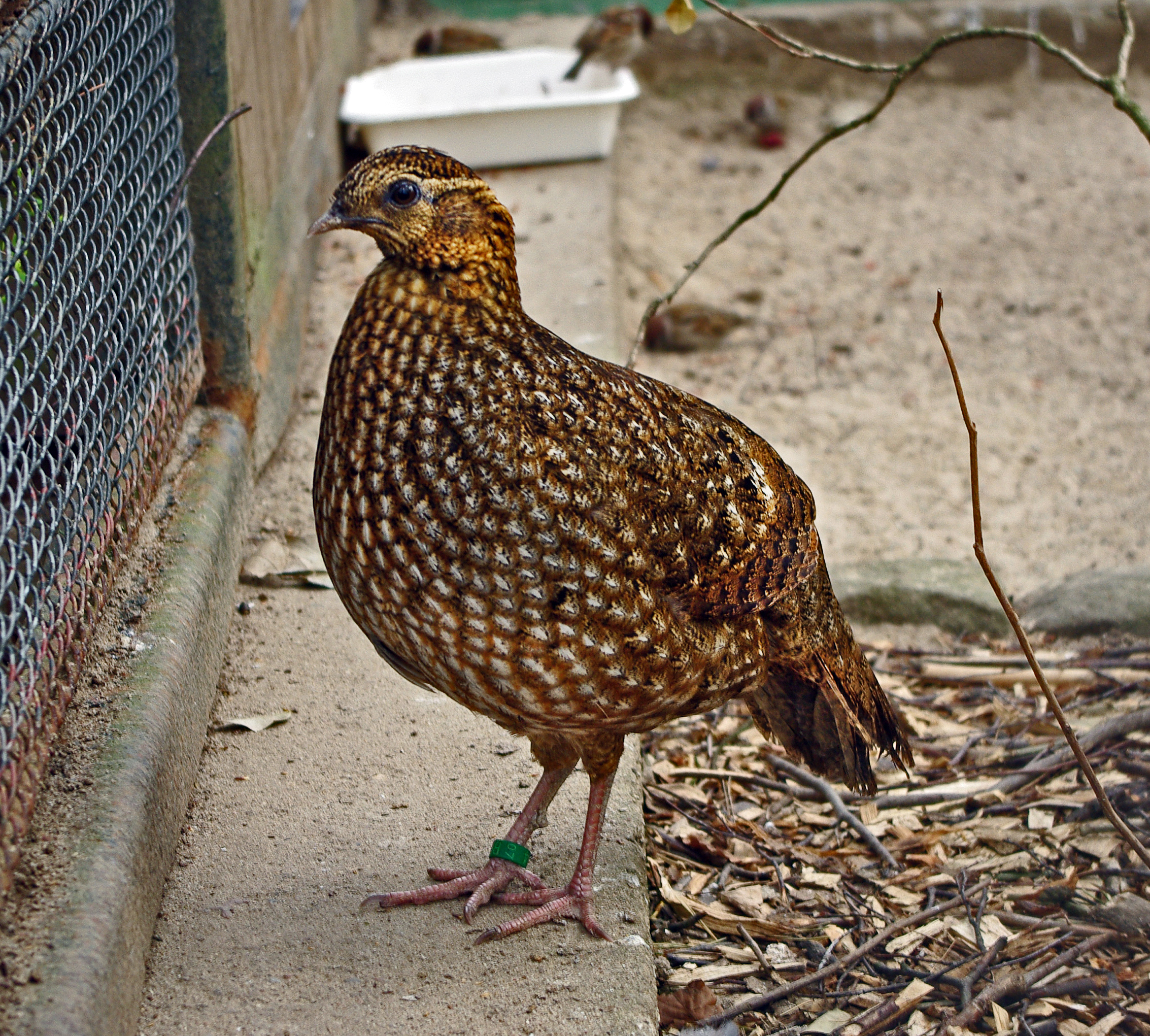
- Adult Female

Conservation status
- Least Concern (IUCN 3.1)

Scientific classification
- Kingdom: Animalia
- Phylum: Chordata
- Class: Aves
- Order: Galliformes
- Family: Phasianidae
- Genus: Tragopan
- Species: T. temminckii

Binomial name
- Tragopan temminckii (Gray, JE, 1831)

= Temminck's tragopan =

Species of bird

Temminck's tragopan (Tragopan temminckii) is a medium-sized, approximately 64 cm long, pheasant in the genus Tragopan. The male is a stocky red-and-orange bird with white-spotted plumage, black bill and pink legs. The male's display features include bare blue facial skin, inflatable dark-blue lappet and horns. The females are a white-spotted brown with blue circular eye skin.

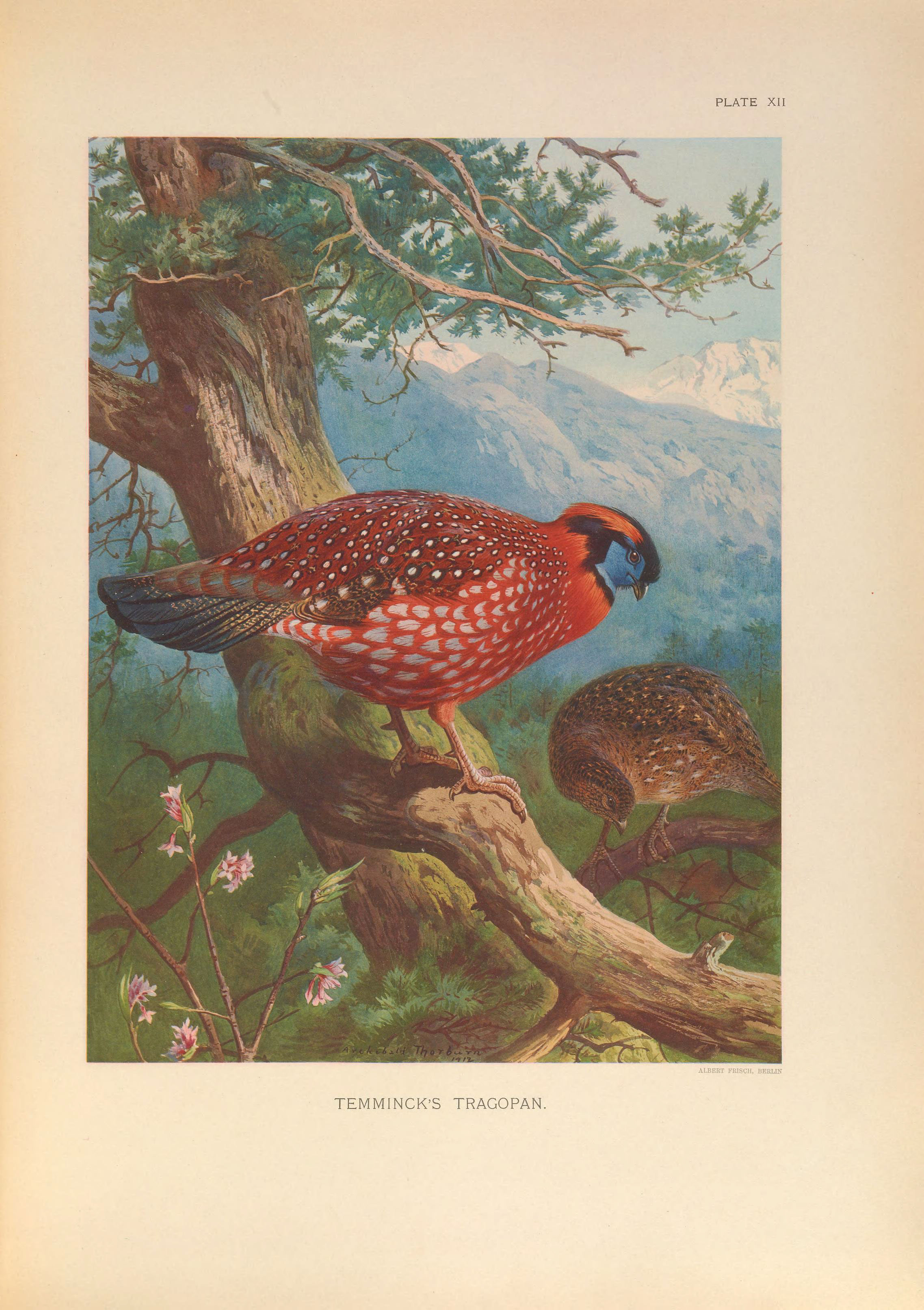
Illustration showing the male and female of the species.

Its appearance resembles the satyr tragopan, but unlike the latter species it has an all red upperbody plumage and an orange collar. The diet consists mainly of berries, grass and plants.

Temminck's tragopan is found across the mountains of far northeast India, central China, far northern Myanmar to northwestern Tonkin in Vietnam.

Widespread and a common species throughout its large habitat range, the Temminck's tragopan is evaluated as Least Concern on the IUCN Red List of Threatened Species. As of 2024, its global population is estimated to be 67,000-340,000 mature individuals.

This bird's common name and Latin binomial commemorate the Dutch naturalist Coenraad Jacob Temminck.
