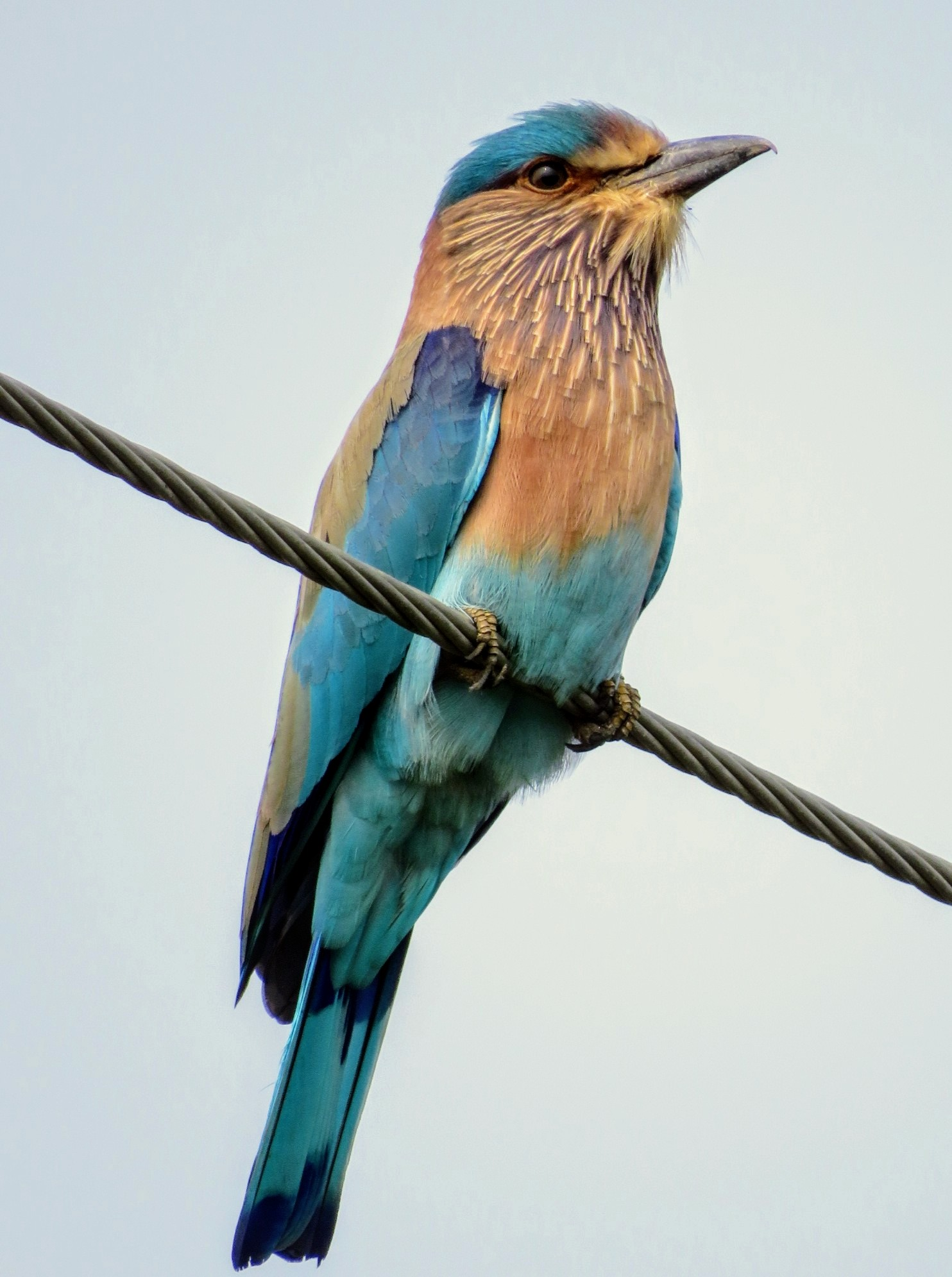
- Indian roller, Gujarat

Conservation status
- Near Threatened (IUCN 3.1)

Scientific classification
- Kingdom: Animalia
- Phylum: Chordata
- Class: Aves
- Order: Coraciiformes
- Family: Coraciidae
- Genus: Coracias
- Species: C. benghalensis

Binomial name
- Coracias benghalensis (Linnaeus, 1758)
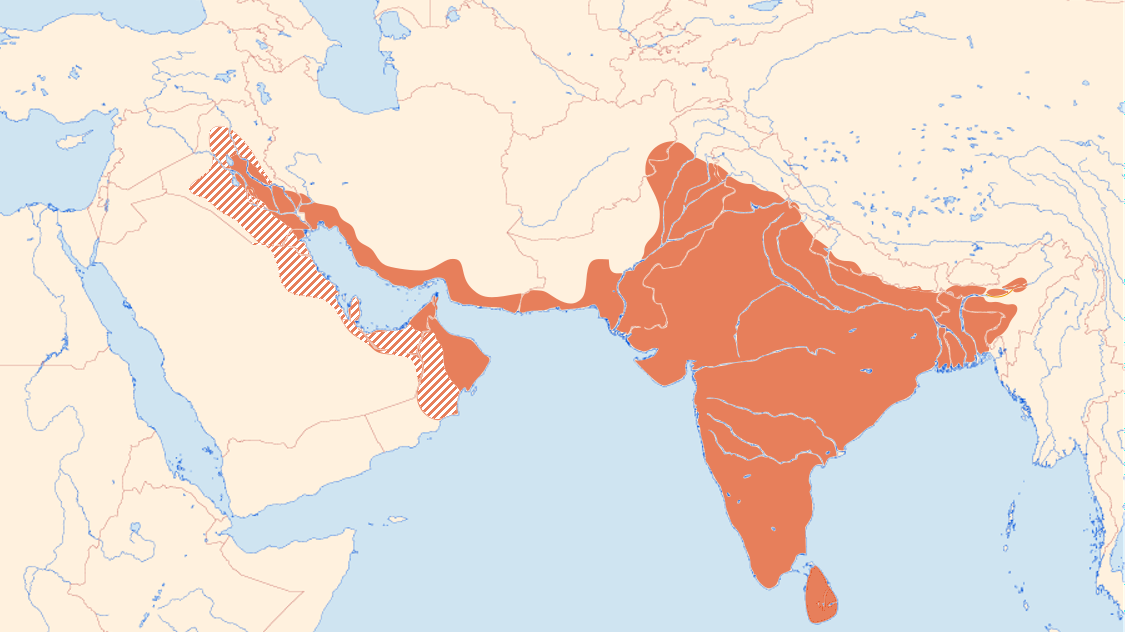
- breeding range non-breeding range

Synonyms
- Corvus benghalensis Linnaeus, 1758; Coracias indica Linnaeus, 1766

= Indian roller =

Species of bird

The Indian roller (Coracias benghalensis) is a bird of the family Coraciidae. It is 30–34 cm (12–13 in) long with a wingspan of 65–74 cm (26–29 in) and weighs 166–176 g (5.9–6.2 oz). The face and throat are pinkish, the head and back are brown, with blue on the rump and contrasting light and dark blue on the wings and tail. The bright blue markings on the wing are prominent in flight. The sexes are similar in appearance. Two subspecies are recognised.

The Indian roller occurs widely from West Asia to the Indian subcontinent. Often found perched on roadside trees and wires, it is common in open grassland and scrub forest habitats, and has adapted well to human-modified landscapes. It mainly feeds on insects, especially beetles. The species is best known for the aerobatic displays of males during the breeding season. Adult males and females form pair bonds and raise the young together. The female lays 3–5 eggs in a cavity or crevice, which is lined with a thin mat of straw or feathers. The roller is the state bird of three Indian states. It is listed as a species of least concern on the IUCN Red List.

== Taxonomy ==
The Indian roller was one of the many bird species originally described by Carl Linnaeus in the 1758 10th edition of Systema Naturae, where he coined the binomial name Corvus benghalensis. Linnaeus based his description on the "Jay from Bengal" described and illustrated in 1731 by the English naturalist Eleazar Albin, derived from a drawing by illustrator Joseph Dandridge.

In 1766, Linnaeus described an Indian roller under the name Coracias indica, based on a description by George Edwards in 1764 of a specimen collected in Sri Lanka. The latter name was used for many years; Indian ornithologist Biswamoy Biswas suspected it was because Linnaeus' 12th edition of Systema Naturae was preferred as the starting point for formal descriptions. German ornithologist Ernst Hartert determined there were distinct northern and southern subspecies and allocated benghalensis to the former and indicus to the latter. However, Biswas noted that the type locality (where the specimen was originally found) for benghalensis was Madras Presidency, which lies within the range of the southern subspecies, and proposed a neotype be selected from Bengal, where Linnaeus had assumed the taxon had come from. This was accepted by the International Commission on Zoological Nomenclature in 1962.

Two subspecies are recognized:

- C. b. benghalensis (Linnaeus, 1758) occurs from western Asia to India north of the Vindhya Range.
- C. b. indicus Linnaeus, 1766 occurs in central and southern India and in Sri Lanka. It is distinguished by its slightly shorter wing and tail, darker blue crown and upper wing coverts, more brownish mantle and shoulder, and more pronounced red-brown collar on hindneck.

The Indochinese roller (C. affinis) was often treated as a subspecies due to some hybridisation between the two taxa over an area from central Nepal to western Assam. However, a 2018 molecular study of nuclear and mitochondrial DNA showed that the latter taxon was actually most closely related to the purple-winged roller (C. temminckii) while the Indian roller was their next closest relative, diverging from a lineage that gave rise to those two species.

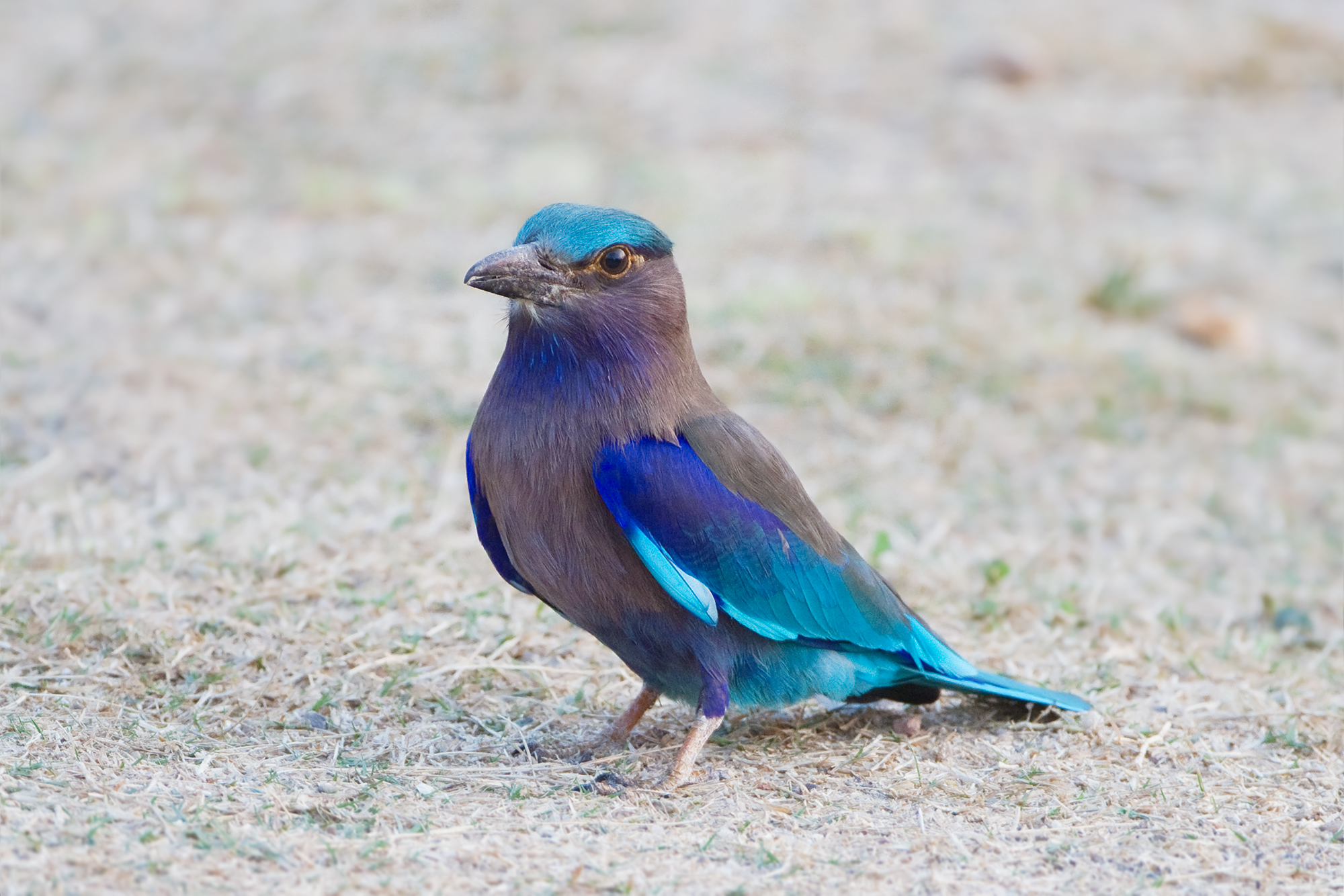
The closely related Indochinese roller (C. affinis) was considered a subspecies of the Indian roller.

The phylogenetic relationships among the Coracias species are shown below, from the molecular study by Johansson et al. (2018)

- Coracias
  - Blue-bellied roller – C. cyanogaster
  - - - Purple roller – C. naevius
      - Racket-tailed roller – C. spatulatus
    - - - Indian roller – C. benghalensis
        - - Indochinese roller – C. affinis
          - Purple-winged roller – C. temminckii
      - - Lilac-breasted roller – C. caudatus
        - - Abyssinian roller – C. abyssinicus
          - European roller – C. garrulus

The International Ornithologists' Union has designated "Indian roller" the official common name for the species. In British India, it was also colloquially termed 'blue jay'. The Indian roller is called 'Little King' by villagers in Khuzestan Province in Iran.

== Description ==
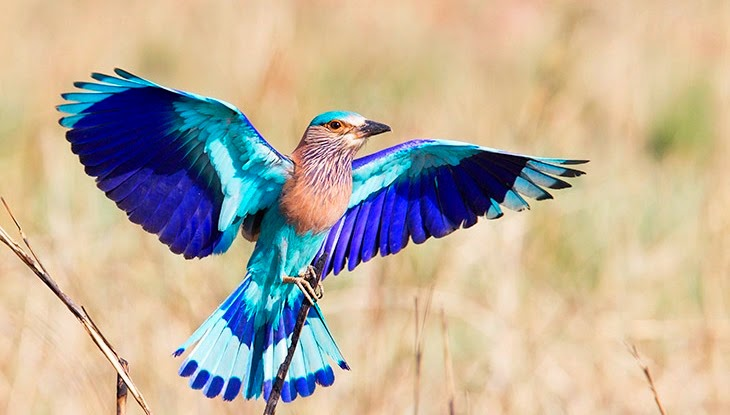
Indian roller in flight showing the intense purple-blue and pale blue bands on wings and tail.

The Indian roller is a bulky and broad-winged bird with a large head and short neck and legs. It has a body length of 30–34 cm (12–13 in) with a wingspan of 65–74 cm (26–29 in) and weighs 166–176 g (5.9–6.2 oz). The bare skin around the eyes is dull orange, the legs and feet are yellow-brown. The bill is tinged with brown at the base. The iris is grey-brown.

=== Plumage ===
The plumage on the forehead, chin and lores are pinkish buff, the ear coverts are darker red-brown with pale cream or pinkish streaks, while the throat is a dull wine-red with narrow cream streaks. The crown and nape are a darker dull turquoise. The back and rump are a bright turquoise, and the belly is pale blue. The tail coverts are dark purple-blue with turquoise tips. The middle two tail feathers are greyish blue-olive with black shafts, while the surrounding tail feathers are an intense purple-blue with a broad pale blue band and greenish tinge towards the tips. The flight feathers on the wings have the same purple-blue colour of those on the tail, with a similar pale blue band across the most distal five or six primaries. The underwing coverts and axillary feathers are pale blue, while the upperwing coverts are a dull green-blue. The primary coverts are pale blue with olive or purple-blue tips, and the lesser coverts are purple-blue along the leading edge of the wing. The colours look dull when the bird is perched but become vibrant in flight. Moulting commences anywhere from mid-June to mid-August and concludes between November and the beginning of March.

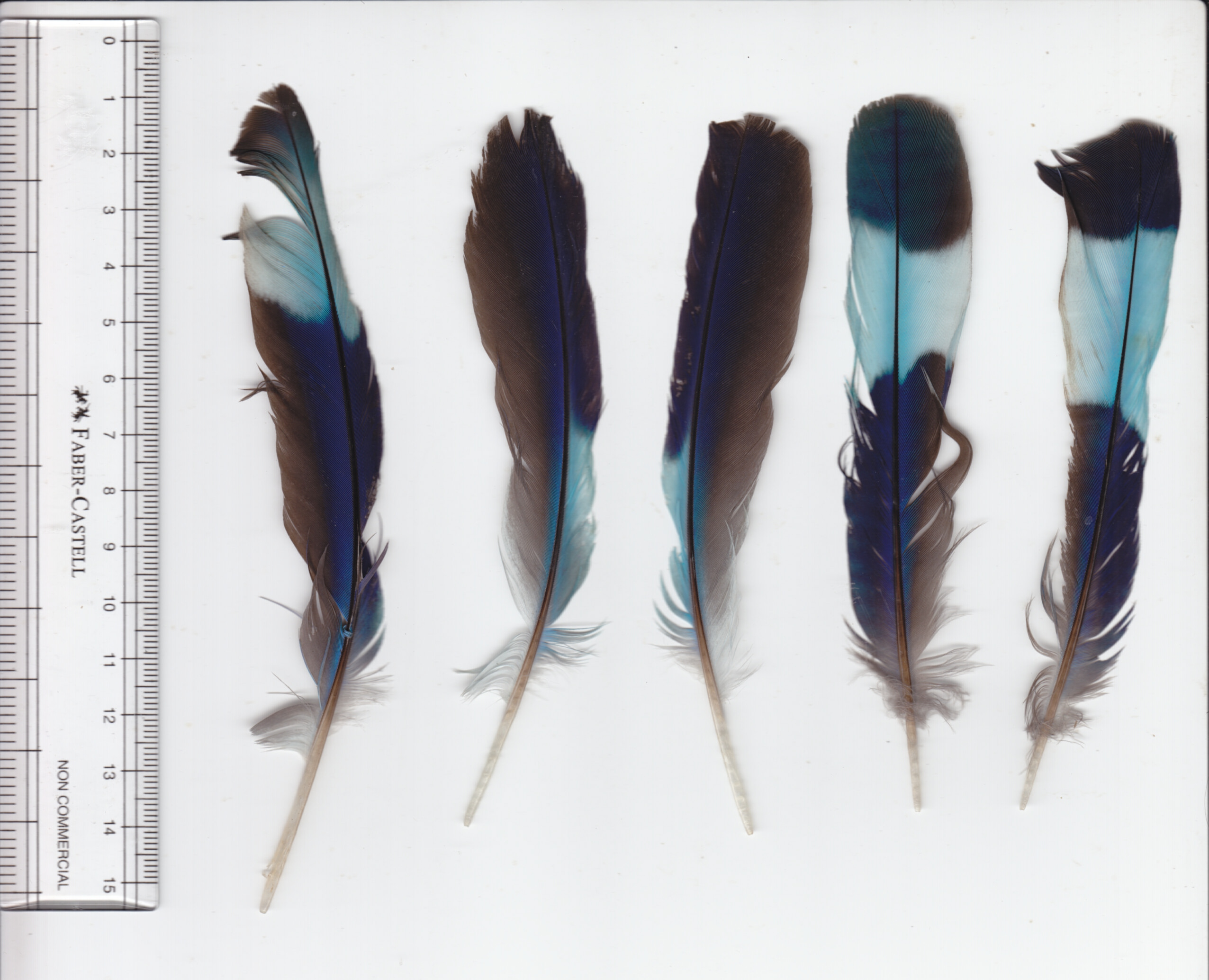
Scan of Indian roller feathers: a primary, two outer secondaries and two tail feathers

The blue colours of the flight feathers are structural and are formed by microstructures in the barbs that produce blue through scattering, which C.V. Raman noted in the 1930s as being more complex than can be explained by the Tyndall effect. Studies in 2010 found the feather barbs structured like a channel with β-keratin rods 100 nm (3.9×10^{−6} in) in diameter with airspaces between them.

Adult males and females are similar in appearance and there are no seasonal changes. Juvenile birds are duller, paler and browner in colour, with a dull green crown and dull green-blue belly tinged with buff. The bill is brown with a yellowish base rather than black.

=== Voice ===
The Indian roller has a monosyllabic contact call which varies from a short chack to a longer, harsher tschow. Kaarsch calls are made during rolling displays, and increase in frequency and volume as the bird flies towards an intruder. When perched side by side, rollers make staccato chattering. In the nest, young produce a loud, "distressing" sound when calling for food, while young fledglings make a loud "screaming gobble" after eating. Newly independent rollers make cat-like mews while foraging.

=== Differences from other species ===
At a distance the species can be mistaken for the European roller, which is a migrant through parts of the Indian roller's range. The European roller has a longer neck and tail in flight, as well as black primaries and an all-blue head. The Indochinese roller is darker, larger and has a purplish brown and unstreaked face and breast, and blue-green forehead. The underwing coverts are a deeper shade of blue. Its call is higher-pitched and has a more nasal sound.

== Distribution and habitat ==
The Indian roller is distributed from Iraq and United Arab Emirates through the Indian subcontinent, including Sri Lanka. In Pakistan, it is resident in the wetlands around Chotiari Dam in Sindh, in Jiwani Coastal Wetland in Balochistan, and in Punjab along the Tonsa Barrage and Chenab River. It has been recorded as a summer visitor to Jalalabad in northeastern Afghanistan. It has been recorded as a vagrant in Syria, Saudi Arabia, Masirah Island, Qatar, Yemen, Socotra, Bahrain, where it was sighted in 1996 and in 2008, Lakshadweep islands, the Maldive Islands, and Turkey. In Kuwait, it is a common winter visitor at Green Island and farmlands near Al Jahra. In the 1970s, it was reported as a common winter visitor to the marshes and mudflats of Shadegan County in Iran. However, it is listed as resident in Iran.

The species is common, and often found in open woodland dominated by trees of the genera Acacia and Prosopis, and has adapted well to human-modified landscapes such as parks and gardens, fields, date and coconut palm plantations. It has been nicknamed "roundabout bird" in northern Oman, where pairs live in vegetation at roundabouts. In Oman, it is common in the Al Batinah Region and in cultivated areas east of the Sharqiya Sands below elevations of 1,000 m (3,300 ft). In India, it was sighted at elevations ranging from sea level in the Bhitarkanika Mangroves and the Gulf of Mannar to about 2,100 m (6,900 ft) in the Nilgiri Mountains.

== Behaviour and ecology ==
The Indian roller is generally not very gregarious and is usually found alone or in pairs. It is often territorial, though migrants may forage in flocks with no aggression. They patrol their territory by flying at treetop height or three-stories high and when an intruder is spotted, they drive it away by a fast rolling flight. Its migration patterns are not well understood; in Oman they are present year-round but appear to be more common in winter than summer.

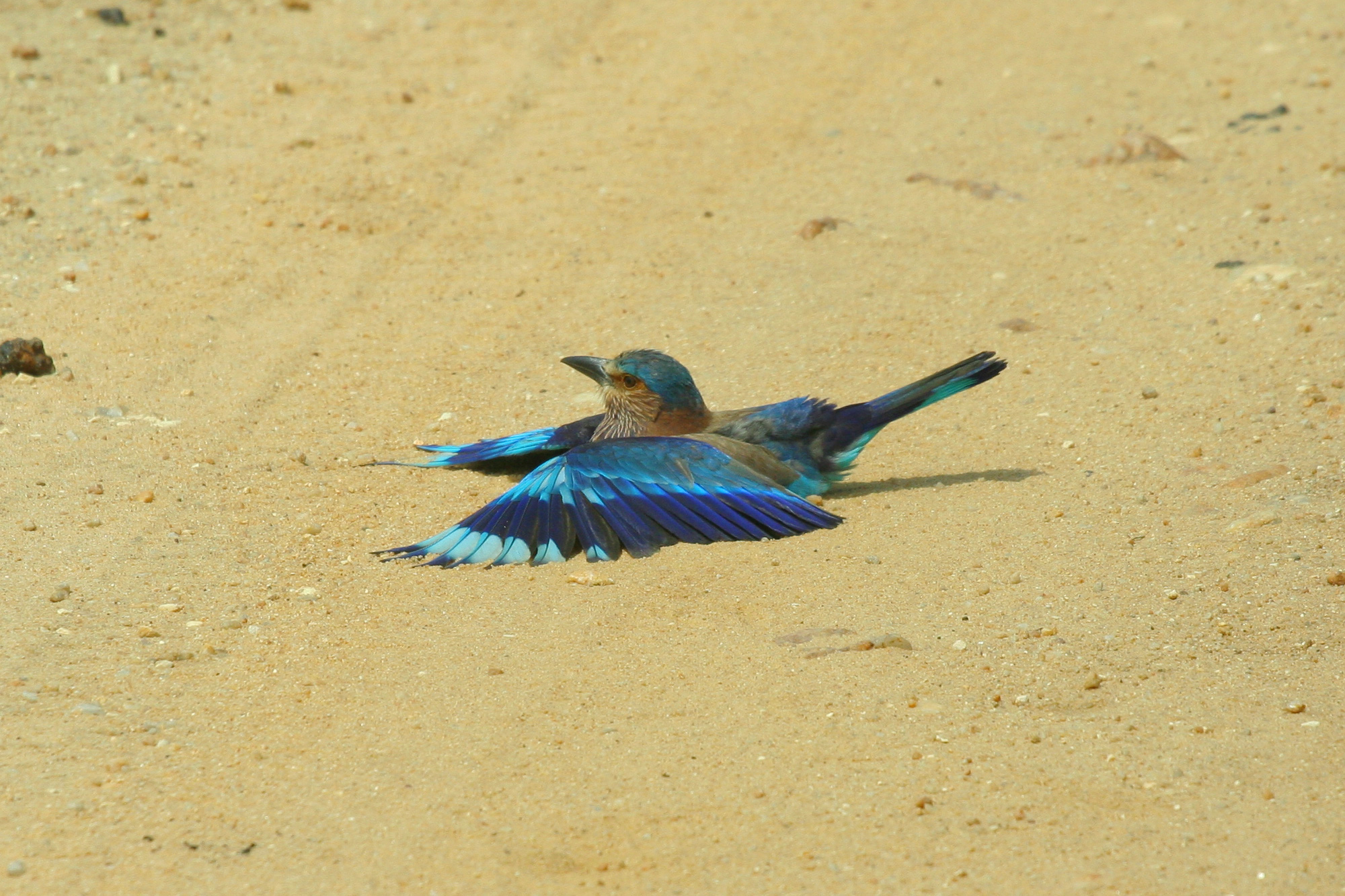
Indian roller sunning

The Indian roller spends a few minutes preening followed by flying around its roosting site. It favours electric or telegraph wires as perches. It has been observed perching in trees and shrubs at a height of 3–9 m (10–30 ft) from where it flies down to forage for ground insects. It also uses higher perches in the upper canopy of trees. The display of the Indian roller is aerobatic with twists and turns. It is attracted by wildfires and darts into hot smoke in pursuit of insects. It has been observed following tractors for disturbed invertebrates. In agricultural habitats in southern India, it has been found at densities of about 50 birds per km^{2}.

Nesting Indian rollers act aggressively towards potential predators. They drive away Indian jungle crows (Corvus culminatus) from nests and have even been recorded repeatedly divebombing an Egyptian vulture (Neophron percnopterus), and flying at humans.

Haemoproteus coraciae live inside the red-blood cells and Leucocytozoon blood parasites have been recorded in the lung tissues. Parasitic helminth worms Hadjelia srivastavai, Cyrnea graphophasiani, Habronema thapari and Synhimantus spiralis have been recorded from the gizzards of Indian rollers.

=== Breeding ===
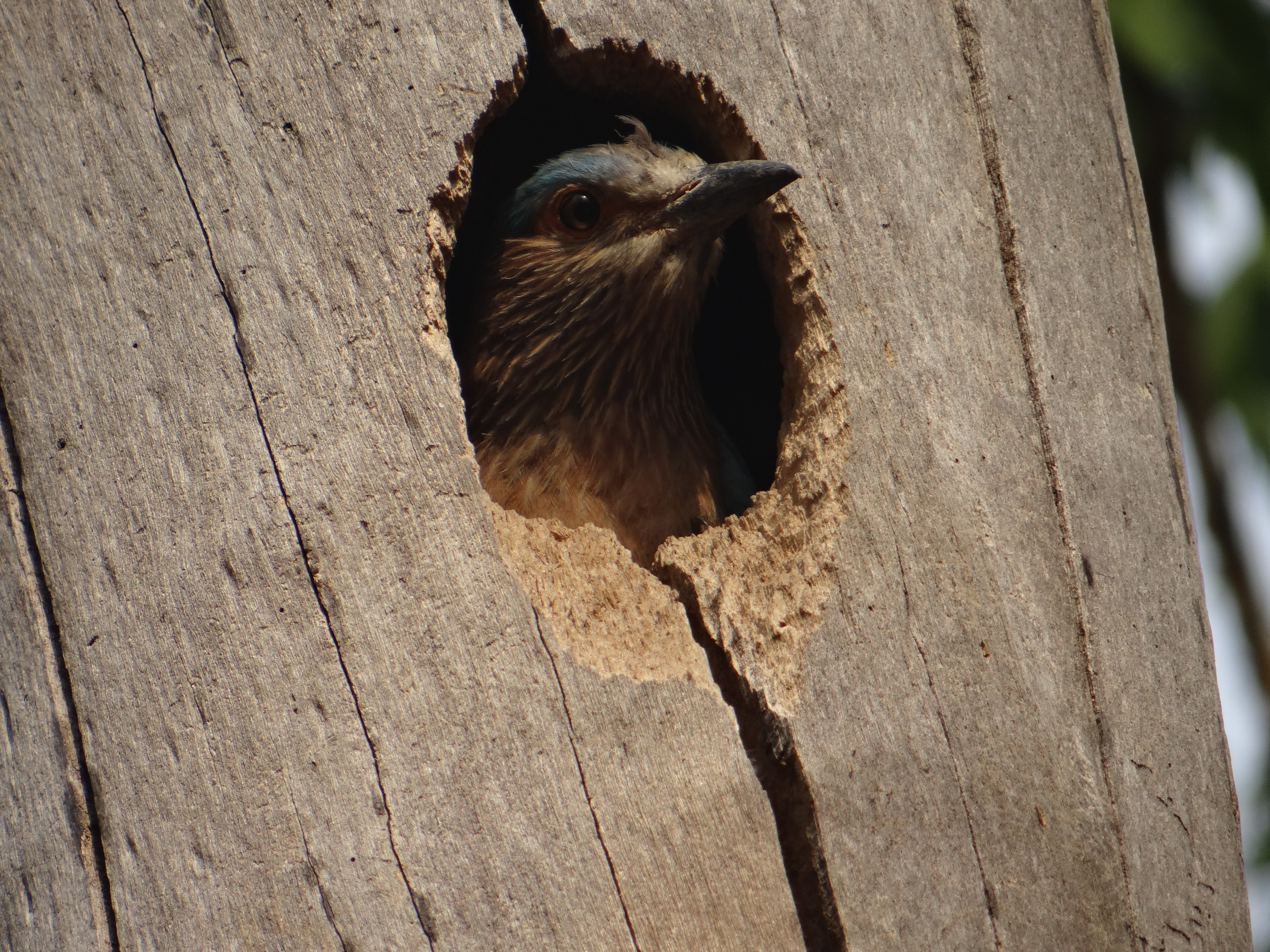
Indian rollers nest in hollows or crevices in buildings.

The breeding season is March to June, slightly earlier in southern India, when adult males and females form pair bonds. During courtship, mates perform aerial displays which include steep, undulating flights, somersaults, nose-drives, hovering and lateral rolling. This is accompanied by vocalizations. The pair then perch and display to each other with bows, dropped wings and fanned tails and may engage in allopreening. The nest site is usually an existing hole in a tree, a dead palm or building but may also be a hole in a mud bank. The hole may be excavated completely in soft material such as rotten wood. A thin mat of feathers, straw or grass is placed at the bottom of the cavity. In Bandhavgarh National Park, nests have been recorded at heights of 3 m (10 ft) in Shorea robusta trees and 7.5 m (25 ft) above the ground in Syzygium cumini trees.

The clutch consists of 3–5 eggs, which are white and oval with an average size of 33 mm × 27 mm (1.3 in × 1.1 in). The eggs are incubated mainly by the female beginning as soon as the first egg is laid and hatch asynchronously after 17 to 19 days. The young are naked when first hatched and are fed and cared for by both parents. The fledging period lasts 30 to 35 days.

=== Food and feeding ===
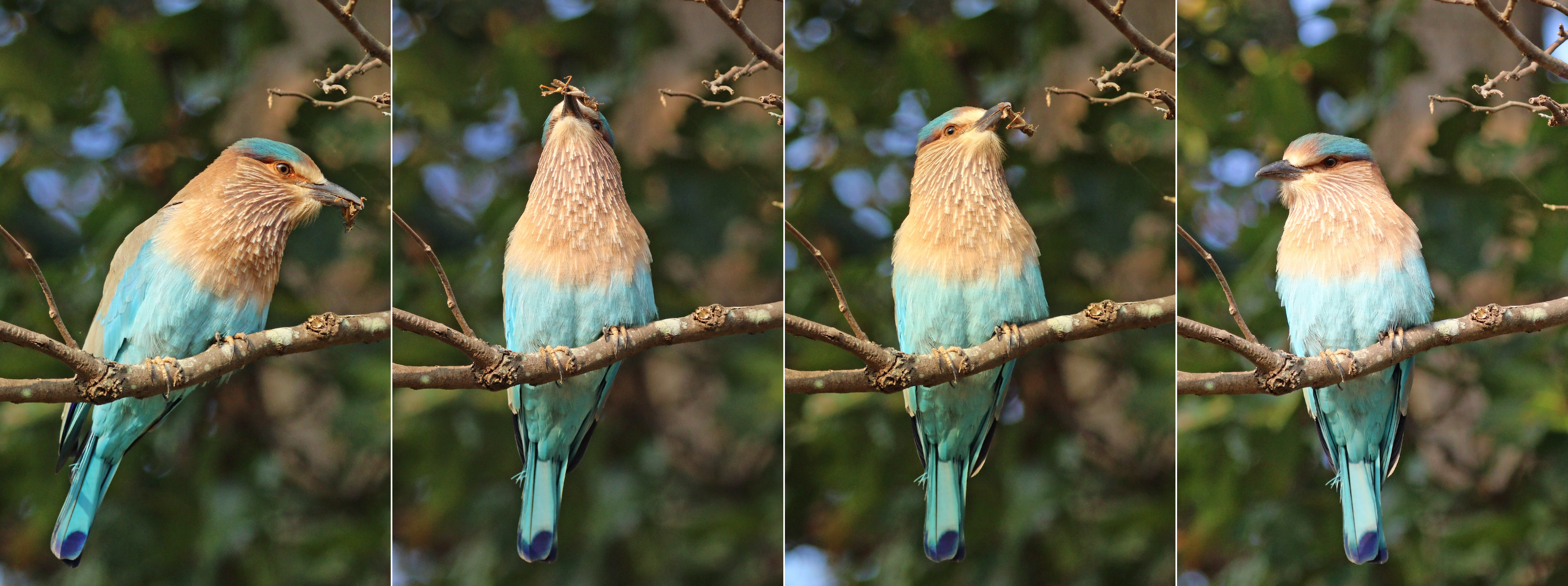
Indian roller eating a grasshopper

The Indian roller descends to the ground to capture insects and to a lesser extent amphibians, reptiles, birds, and small mammals. It is attracted to swarms of winged termites; as many as 40 birds have been seen to perch on a 70 m (230 ft) stretch of electric wire to hunt them. Beetles make up around 45% of its diet, followed by grasshoppers and crickets at around 25%.

The Indian roller often associates with the great Indian bustard (Ardeotis nigriceps), catching insects flushed out by the latter species. In Tamil Nadu, it was observed to forage mainly by gleaning (catching prey on a surface), followed by feeding on the ground and in the air. It occasionally dives into water to take frogs and fish, much like a kingfisher. It may make use of opportunities such as insects attracted to lights, feeding even late after dusk.

In March 2019, an Indian roller was observed feeding on an Indian wolf snake (Lycodon aulicus) in Sathyamangalam Wildlife Sanctuary.

== Conservation ==
In India, the Indian roller received legal protection in 1887, when hunting it was banned under the Wild Birds Protection Act of 1887 and later under the Wild Birds and Animals Protection Act of 1912. In Iran, the Indian roller is protected by the Islamic code, but not listed as protected by law.

As of 2016, the Indian roller was listed as a species of least concern on the IUCN Red List, due to its wide range and apparent increasing population. The total population size is unknown, but it appears to be common in most of its range. As of 2015, about 2,500 breeding pairs were estimated to live in Iraq and 15,000 breeding pairs in the Arabian Peninsula; the population was thought to have increased in particular in the United Arab Emirates.

=== Threats ===
The numbers of Indian roller sighted along the highway between Aligarh and New Delhi decreased between the mid 1960s and mid 1980s, as traffic increased during that time. Its habit of feeding near roadsides sometimes results in collisions with traffic. Its habit of utilizing powerlines puts it at risk of electrocution. In Rajasthan, it was found to be the second most commonly electrocuted bird after the house crow (Corvus splendens).

== In culture ==
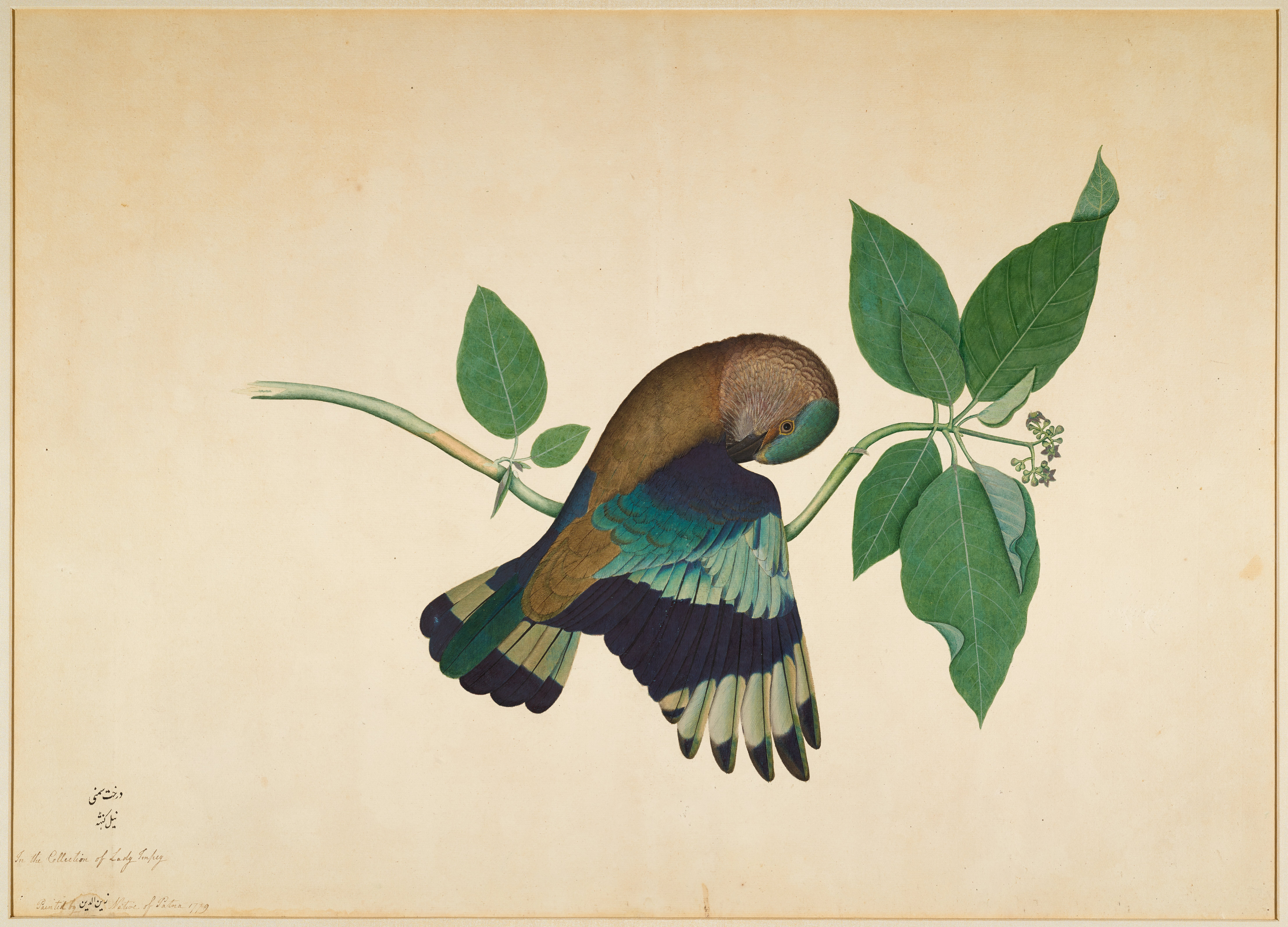
Painting by Sheikh Zainuddin, from the Impey Album, c. 1780.

The Indian roller is associated with Hindu legends and said to be sacred to Vishnu; it used to be caught and released during festivals such as Dussera or the last day of Durga Puja. Adding its chopped feathers to fodder for cows was believed to increase the latter's milk yield, giving it the Telugu name of "paala-pitta" (పాలపిట్ట, pālapiṭṭa), meaning 'milk bird'. A Hindustani name is "neelkanth" (Hindi: नीलकंठ; Urdu: نیل کنٹھ, romanized: nīlkaṇṭh), meaning 'blue throat', a name associated with the deity Shiva due to a legend that he drank the Halahala poison emerging from Samudra Manthana to save the world but stopped it from going past his throat, turning it blue.

The Kol people traditionally considered a sighting of an Indian roller as a good omen as did people in Bengal who, upon seeing the bird, would chant a couplet showing devotion to Vishnu and seeking a vision of the bird at the time of their death. A nomadic tribe of fortune-tellers from the Vishakapatnam area wore feathers of the Indian roller on their head utilizing the folk belief that the bird could foretell events. The Indian roller is the state bird of the Indian states of Odisha, Telangana, and Karnataka.

At the height of the plume trade in the early 20th century, the Indian roller was sought for export of its colourful feathers, and was among the most widely killed bird species in India.
