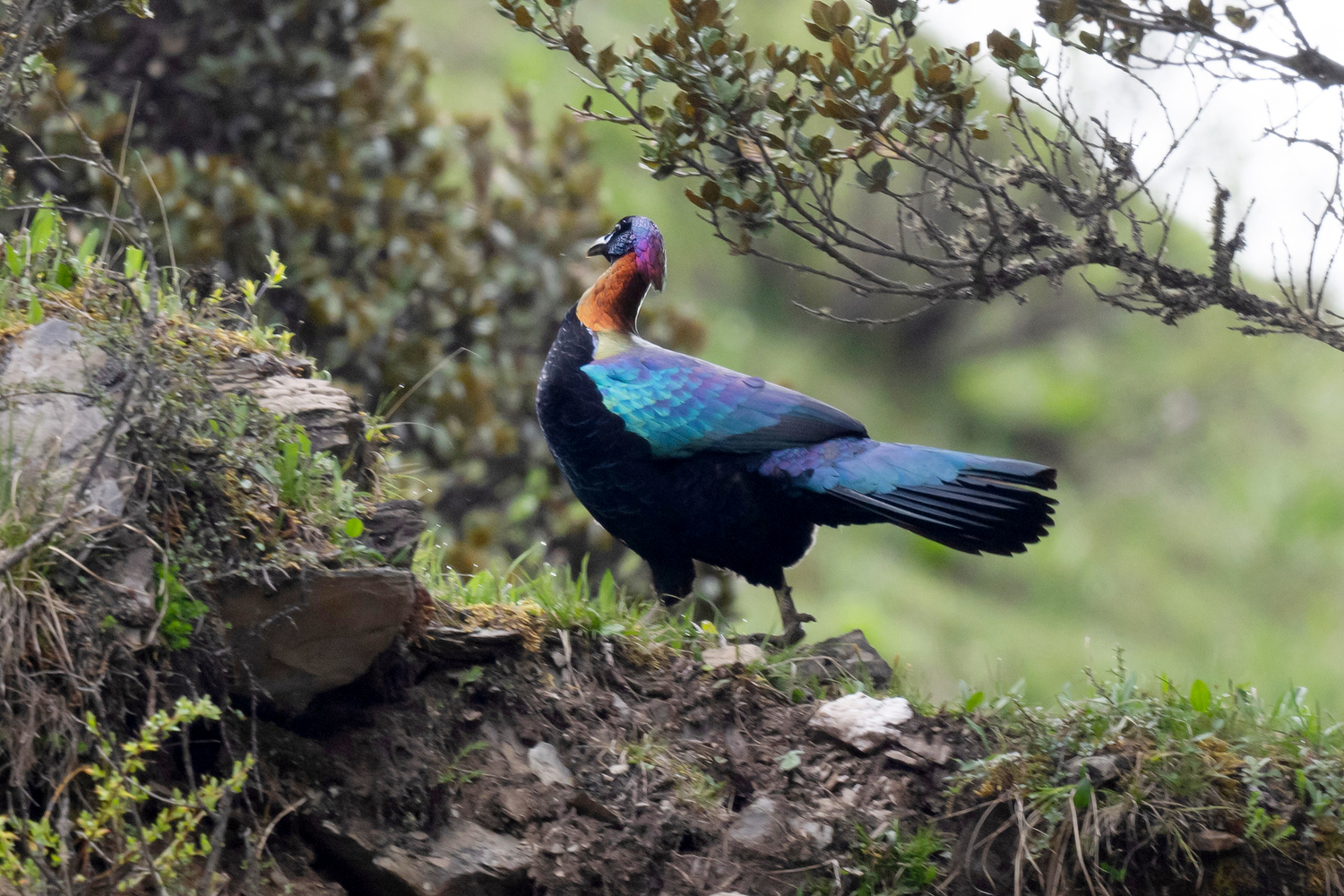
- Chinese Monal on Balangshan, Sichuan, China

Conservation status
- Vulnerable (IUCN 3.1)
- CITES Appendix I

Scientific classification
- Kingdom: Animalia
- Phylum: Chordata
- Class: Aves
- Order: Galliformes
- Family: Phasianidae
- Genus: Lophophorus
- Species: L. lhuysii

Binomial name
- Lophophorus lhuysii Geoffroy Saint-Hilaire, A, 1866

= Chinese monal =

Species of bird

The Chinese monal or Chinese impeyan (Lophophorus lhuysii) is a species in the pheasant family Phasianidae native to west-central China, where it is restricted to the mountains of western Sichuan and southern Gansu.

== Description ==
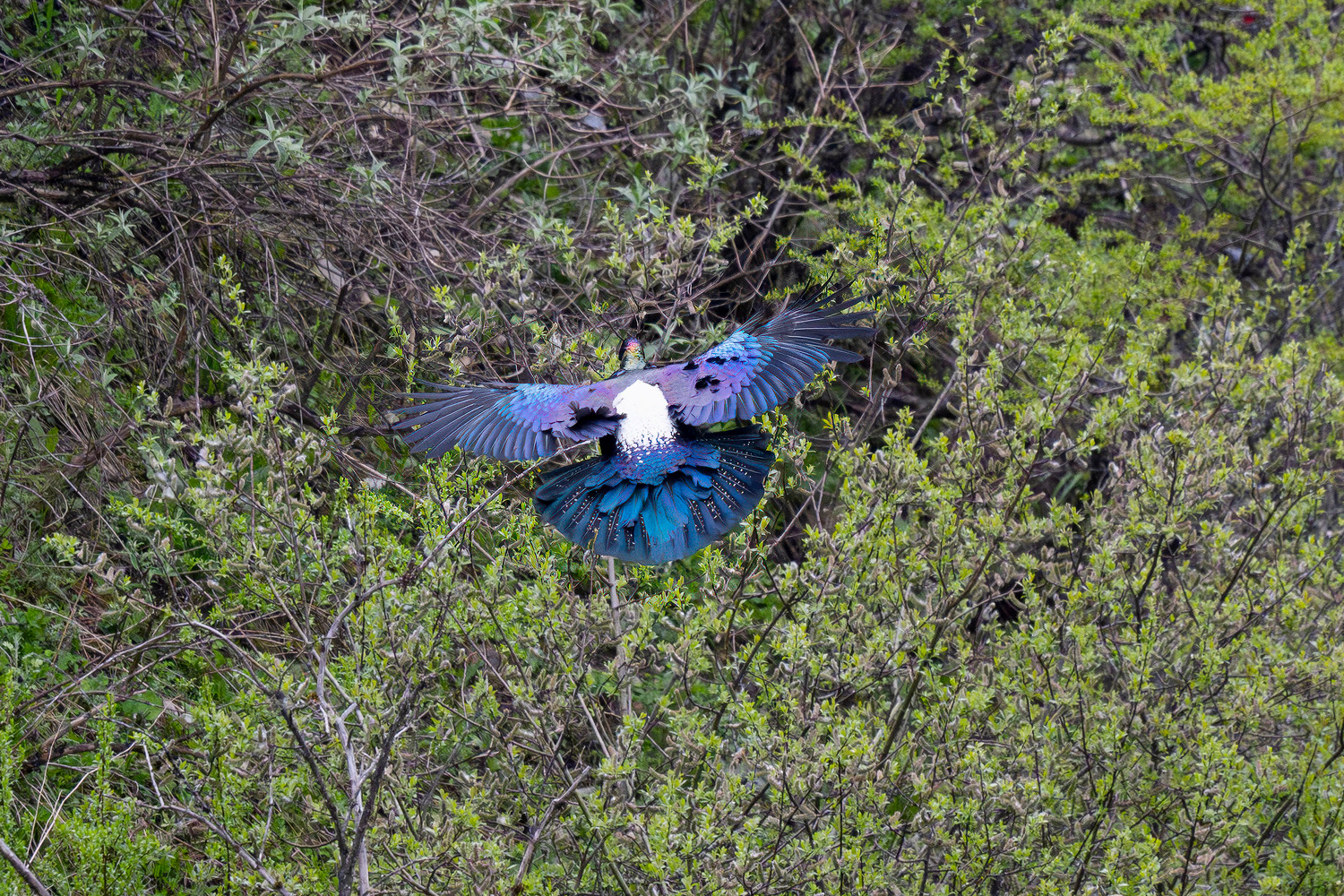
Male in flight, showing the white rump.

This is the largest of the three monals and, by weight, is one of the larger species of Phasianidae, after the turkeys, the peafowls, and the capercaillies. Males measure 76–80 cm (30–31 in) in length while females measure 72–75 cm (28–30 in). The mean weight is reported to be 3.18 kg (7.0 lb).

The male has a large drooping purple crest, a metallic green head, blue bare skin around the eyes, a reddish gold mantle, bluish green feathers, black underparts, and a white rump; the plumage is highly iridescent. The female is dark brown with white on its throat.

== Etymology ==
The scientific name, lhuysii, commemorates the French statesman Édouard Drouyn de Lhuys.

== Status ==
Due to ongoing habitat loss and degradation, limited range and illegal hunting, the Chinese monal is evaluated as vulnerable on IUCN Red List of Threatened Species. It is listed on Appendix I of CITES.

== In captivity ==
London Zoo and Beijing Zoo have kept Chinese monal but all attempts to establish a captive breeding population failed.

== See also ==
- List of endangered and protected species of China
