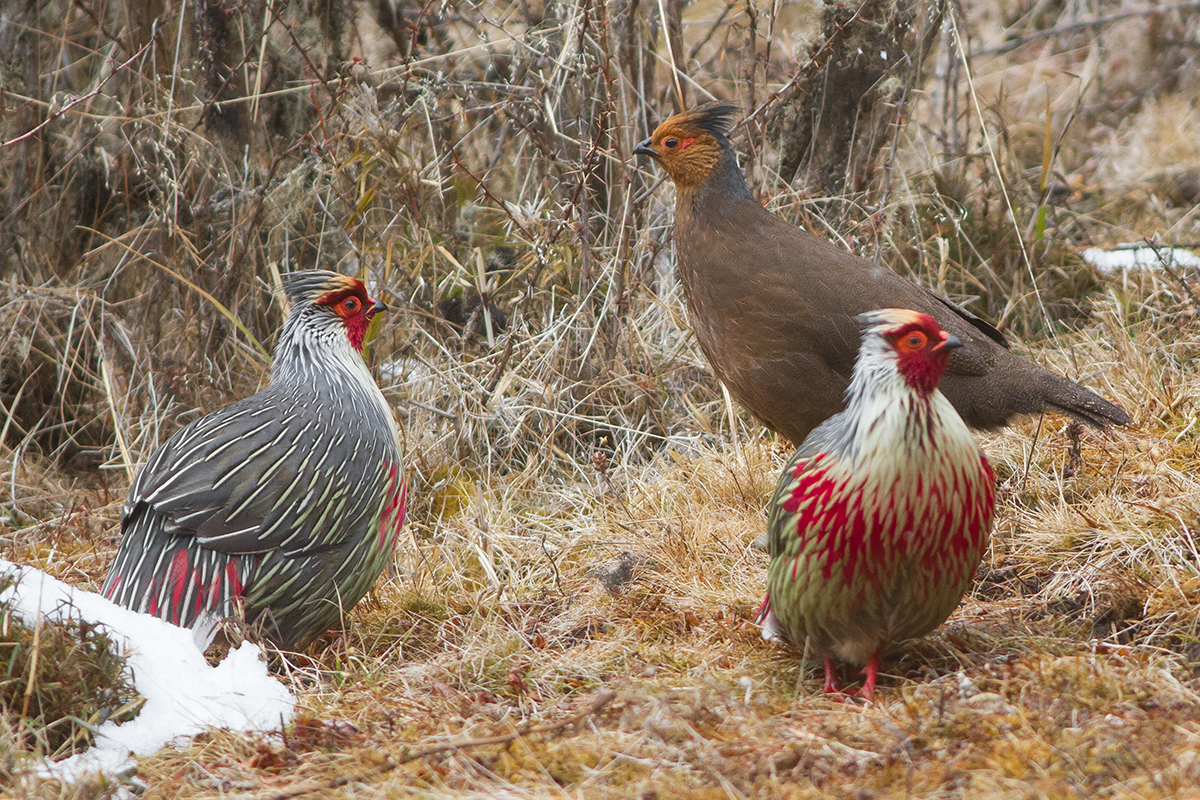
- A flock in Phrumsengla National Park, Bhutan

Conservation status
- Least Concern (IUCN 3.1)
- CITES Appendix II

Scientific classification
- Kingdom: Animalia
- Phylum: Chordata
- Class: Aves
- Order: Galliformes
- Family: Phasianidae
- Subfamily: Phasianinae
- Genus: Ithaginis; Wagler, 1832
- Species: I. cruentus

Binomial name
- Ithaginis cruentus (Hardwicke, 1821)

Synonyms
- Ithaginis cruentatus

= Blood pheasant =

Species of bird

The blood pheasant (Ithaginis cruentus) or blood partridge is a galliforme bird in the pheasant family Phasianidae and the only species in the genus Ithaginis. It is a relatively small, short-tailed pheasant that is widespread in the lower Himalayas ranging across North and East India, Nepal, Bhutan, South China and northern Myanmar. It has been classified as Least Concern on the IUCN Red List since 2009, and the global blood pheasant population is thought to be stable.

The blood pheasant is the state bird of Sikkim, India.

== Description ==
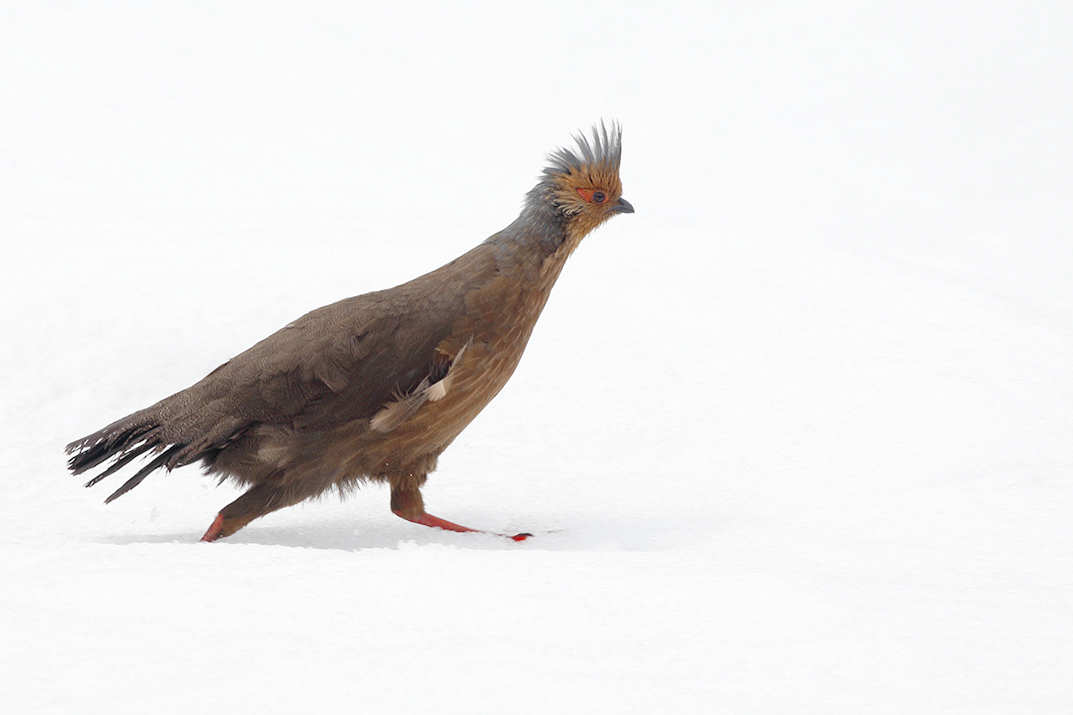
Female in Sikkim, India.

The blood pheasant has the size of a small fowl, about 17 in (43 cm) in length with a short, convex, very strong black bill, feathered between bill and eye, and a small crest of variously coloured feathers. The colour of the plumage above is dark ash, with white shafts, the coverts of the wings various tinged with green, with broad strokes of white through the length of each feather, the feathers of the chin deep crimson; on the breast, belly, and sides, feathers are lance-shaped, of various length, the tips green with crimson margins, collectively resembling dashes of blood scattered on the breast and belly. The tail consists of 12 subequal feathers, shafts white, rounded, the ends whitish, the coverts a rich crimson red.

Both males and females have red feet and a distinct ring of bare skin around the eye that typically is crimson colored, but is orange in a few subspecies. Females are more uniformly colored, being overall dull brown and often with some gray to the nape. Although some of the subspecies that have been described are highly distinctive, others are not, and some variation appears to be clinal. Consequently, the number of valid subspecies is disputed, with various authorities recognizing between 11 and 15. They mainly vary in the plumage of the males, especially the amount of red or black to the throat, forehead, neck, chest and tail, and the presence or absence of rufous in the wings.

== Taxonomy ==
Twelve subspecies have been described:

- I. c. affinis (CW Beebe, 1912) – Sikkim region in India
- I. c. beicki (Mayr and Birckhead, 1937) – Beick's blood pheasant – north-central China
- I. c. berezowskii (Bianchi, 1903) – Berezovski's blood pheasant – mountains of central China
- I. c. clarkei (Rothschild, 1920) – Clarke's blood pheasant – southwest China
- I. c. cruentus (Hardwicke, 1821) – Himalayan blood pheasant – northern Nepal to northwestern Bhutan
- I. c. geoffroyi (Verreaux, 1867) – Geoffroy's blood pheasant – western China and southeast Tibet
- I. c. kuseri (Beebe, 1912) – Kuser's blood pheasant – upper Assam in India and southeast Tibet
- I. c. marionae (Mayr, 1941) – Mrs. Vernay's blood pheasant – mountains of southwest China and northeast Myanmar
- I. c. michaelis (Bianchi, 1903) – Bianchi's blood pheasant – north-central China
- I. c. rocki (Riley, 1925) – Rock's blood pheasant – southwestern China
- I. c. sinensis (David, 1873) – David's blood pheasant – central China
- I. c. tibetanus (Baker, 1914) – Tibetan blood pheasant – eastern Bhutan and southern Tibet

== Distribution and habitat ==
Blood pheasants live in the mountains of Nepal, Sikkim, northern Myanmar, Tibet, and central and south-central China, where they prefer coniferous or mixed forests and scrub areas near the snowline. They move their range depending on the seasons, and are found at higher elevations during the summer. With snow increasing in fall and winter, they move to lower elevations.

== Ecology ==
Unlike the common pheasant, the blood pheasant is monogamous. Breeding season begins at the end of April when males begin their courtship by displaying in front of females by flying at each other breast-to-breast, biting wattles, or performing high leaps with kicks toward the other's bill. Mate choice by females depends on factors like tail length, length of the ear tufts, and the presence of black points in the wattle, but neither wattle size or color nor the brightness of the plumage affect the females' choice.

The blood pheasant reaches sexual maturity in one year. In early May, mature females begin nesting under paddy straw heaps surrounded by trees, in brush, small caves, or in tree holes near the ground. They excavate shallow pot-like nests and line them with moss, pine needles, and feathers. The female lays 4-14 yellowish-white eggs with brown speckles, at intervals of two or three days. During the 27-33 days of egg incubation, the male is responsible for defending the territory against other male pheasants.

The blood pheasant's distribution in inhospitable high-elevation environments has required adaptation to hypoxia and high levels of ultraviolet radiation.

Blood pheasants move with the snow line when foraging, feeding on moss, ferns, pine shoots, and lichens.

== Conservation ==
The species is currently classified as Least Concern on the IUCN Red List. However, more than half the population is considered to be threatened by habitat loss and fragmentation, illegal hunting and human disturbance. Much of the distribution range of pheasants in Southwest China overlaps with the habitat of the giant panda, and livestock grazing has become the most prevalent human disturbance across associated protection areas. The blood pheasant's ground-nesting habits and relatively long incubation period make it especially vulnerable to trampling and habitat degradation by grazers.
