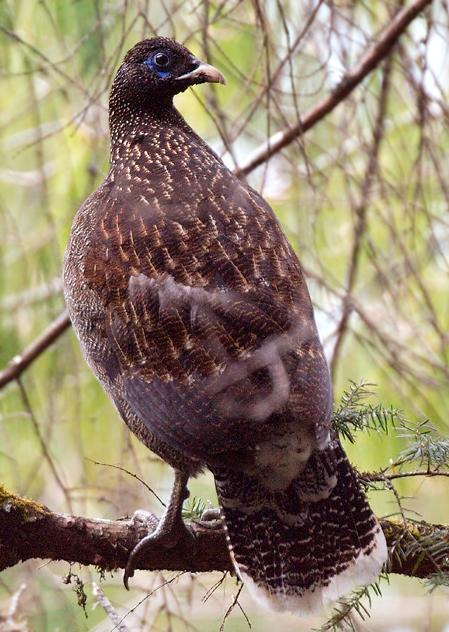
- Female (hen)

Conservation status
- Least Concern (IUCN 3.1)
- CITES Appendix I

Scientific classification
- Kingdom: Animalia
- Phylum: Chordata
- Class: Aves
- Order: Galliformes
- Family: Phasianidae
- Genus: Lophophorus
- Species: L. sclateri

Binomial name
- Lophophorus sclateri Jerdon, 1870

= Sclater's monal =

Species of bird

Sclater's monal (Lophophorus sclateri) also known as the crestless monal is a Himalayan landfowl. The name commemorates the British zoologist Philip Lutley Sclater.

== Taxonomy ==
Sclater's monal has three recognized subspecies:

- L. s. arunachalensis (Kumar & Singh, 2004)
- L. s. orientalis (Davison G.W.H., 1974)
- L. s. sclateri (Jerdon, 1870)

== Description ==
Sclater's monal is a large, approximately 68 centimetres (27 in) long, monal pheasant. As with other monals, the male is a colourful bird. It has a highly iridescent purplish-green upperparts plumage, short and curly metallic green crown feathers, copper neck, purplish-black throat, white back, blue orbital skin, yellowish-orange bill and brown iris. In the nominate subspecies, the tail is white with a broad chestnut band, while the tail is entirely white in L. s. arunachalensis from western Arunachal Pradesh in India. The crestless female is mostly a dark brown bird with a white throat and tail-tip, dull bluish orbital skin and a pale yellow bill.

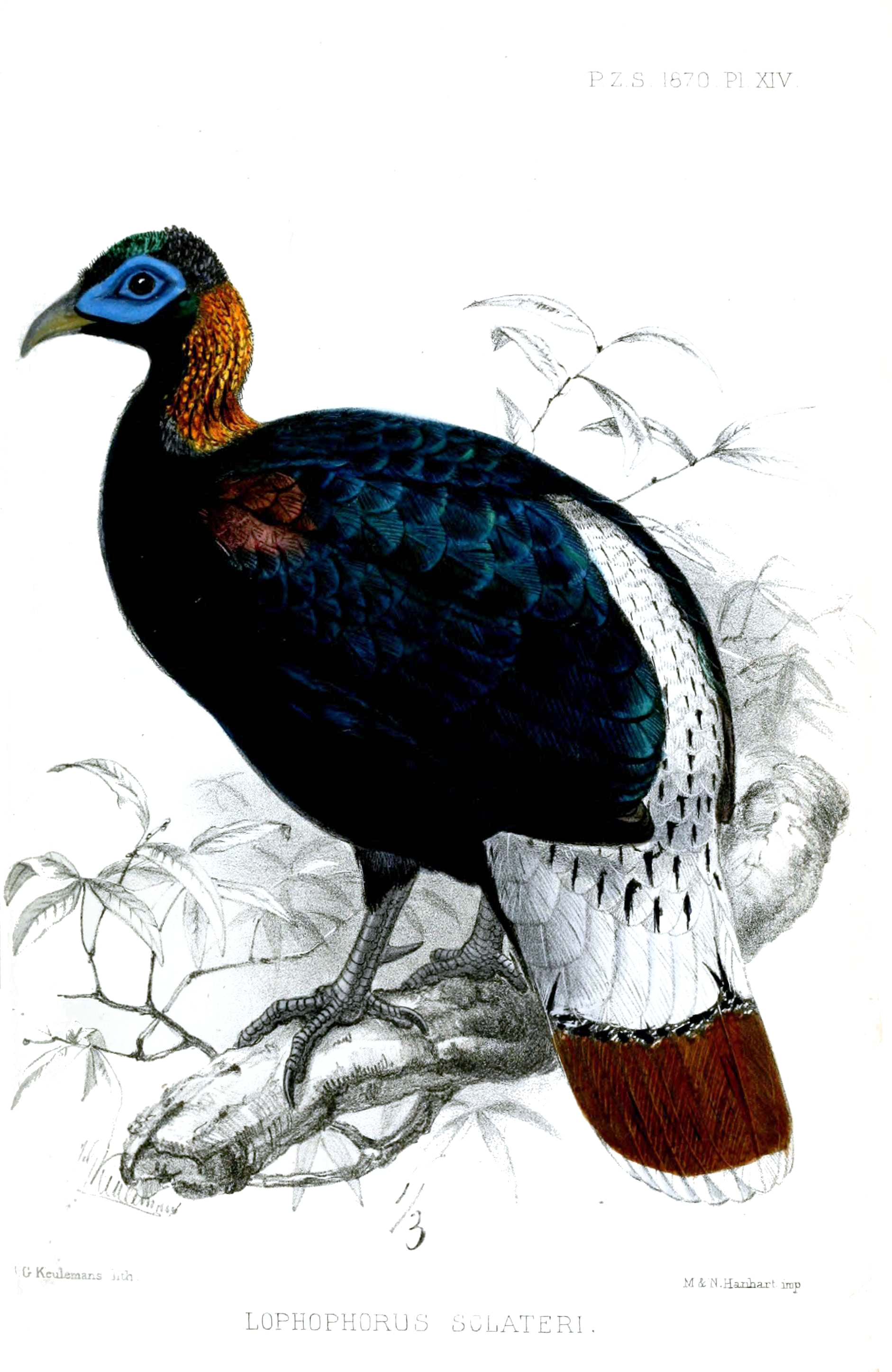
Male

== Distribution and habitat ==
Sclater's monal is distributed to mountain forests of the east Himalayan region, in north-eastern India, south-eastern Tibet and northern Burma, at altitudes of 2,500 to 4,200 metres (8,200 to 13,800 ft).

== Behaviour ==
The diet of the Sclater's monal, like that of other members of the genus Lophophorus, probably consists mainly of tubers, roots, bulbs, arthropods, rodents, seeds and flowers. The female usually lays between three and five eggs. It is not known if the male participates in nest defense, but it is likely.

== Conservation ==
Despite an overall decreasing population size, Sclater's monal is evaluated as Least Concern on the IUCN Red List due to its large range. It is listed on Appendix I of CITES.
