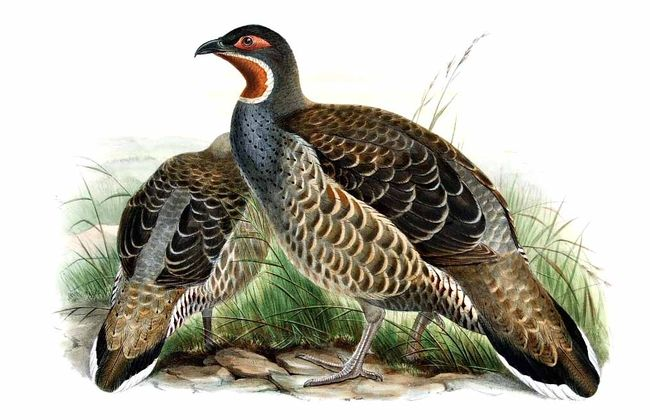

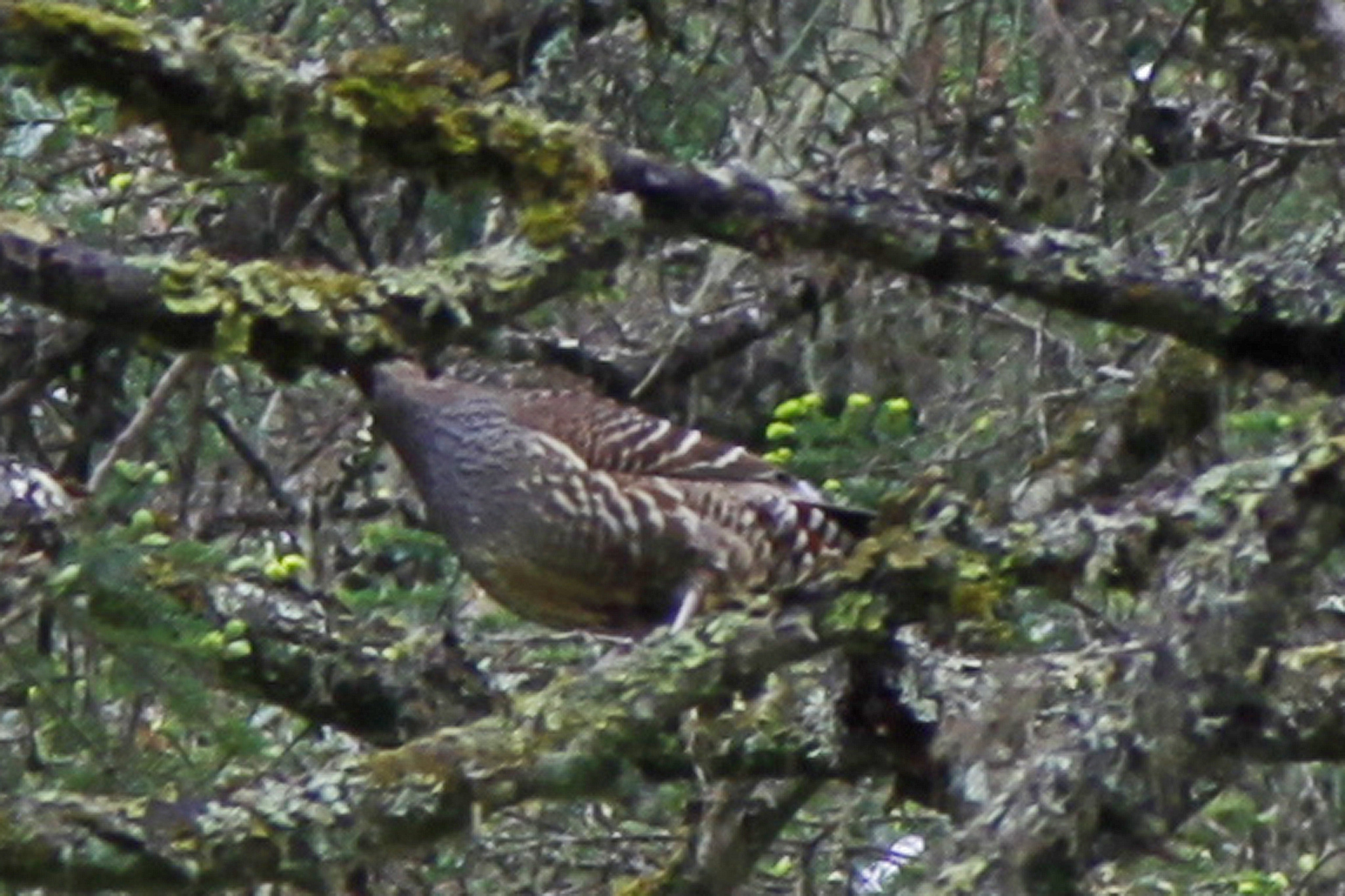

Conservation status
- Least Concern (IUCN 3.1)

Scientific classification
- Kingdom: Animalia
- Phylum: Chordata
- Class: Aves
- Order: Galliformes
- Family: Phasianidae
- Genus: Tetraophasis
- Species: T. obscurus

Binomial name
- Tetraophasis obscurus (Verreaux, 1869)

= Chestnut-throated monal-partridge =

Species of bird

Chestnut-throated monal-partridge (Tetraophasis obscurus), also known as chestnut-throated partridge or Verreaux's monal-partridge, is a bird species in the family Phasianidae. It is found only in central China. Its natural habitat is boreal forest.

The common name "Verreaux's monal-partridge" commemorate the French naturalist Jules Verreaux.
