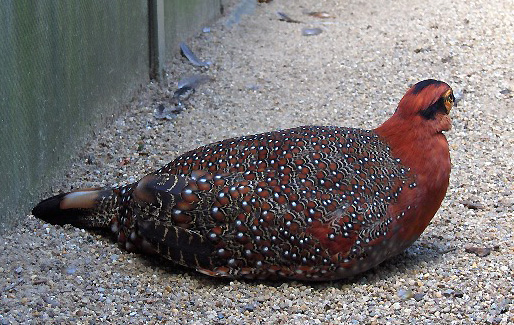
- Blyth's tragopan (Tragopan blythii)

Scientific classification
- Kingdom: Animalia
- Phylum: Chordata
- Class: Aves
- Order: Galliformes
- Family: Phasianidae
- Tribe: Lophophorini
- Genus: Tragopan; Cuvier, 1829

Type species
- Meleagris satyra (satyr tragopan) Linnaeus, 1758

= Tragopan =

Genus of birds

Tragopan is a bird genus in the pheasant family Phasianidae. Members of this genus are colloquially called "horned pheasants" because males have two brightly coloured, fleshy horns on their head that they can erect during courtship displays. Despite this name, they are not true pheasants and are not closely related to them. The habit of tragopans to nest in trees is unique among phasianids.

== Taxonomy ==
The genus Tragopan was introduced by the French naturalist Georges Cuvier in 1829 for the satyr tragopan. The name tragopan is a mythical horned purple-headed bird mentioned by the Roman authors Pliny and Pomponius Mela.

The genus contains five species.

| Image | Name | Common name | Distribution |
|---|---|---|---|
| | Tragopan melanocephalus | Western tragopan | Kohistan, Kaghan valley, Kishtwar, Chamba, Kullu and an area east of the Satluj river, Pakistan |
| | Tragopan satyra | Satyr tragopan | India, Tibet, Nepal and Bhutan. |
| | Tragopan temminckii | Temminck's tragopan | northern Myanmar to northwestern Tonkin. |
| | Tragopan blythii | Blyth's tragopan | Bhutan through northeast India, north Myanmar to southeast Tibet, and also China. |
| | Tragopan caboti | Cabot's tragopan | provinces of Fujian, Jiangxi, Zhejiang, and Guangdong, China |
