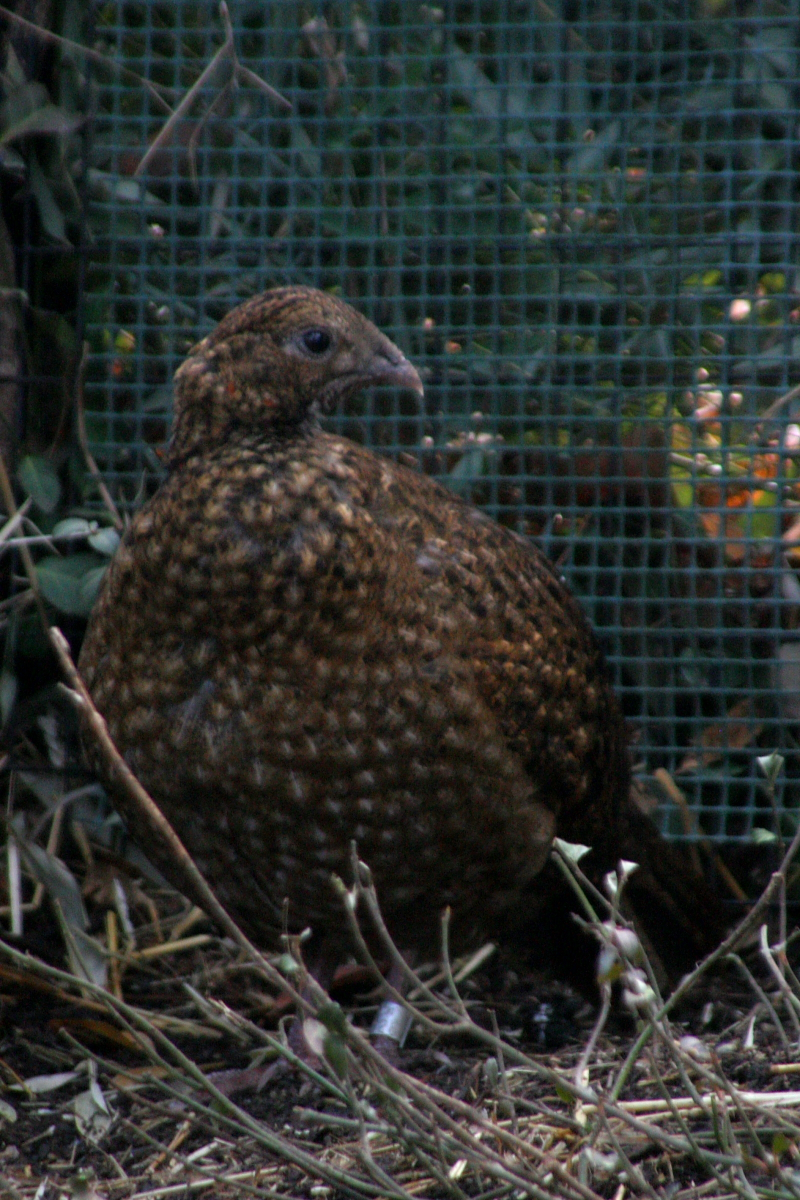
- Female

Conservation status
- Least Concern (IUCN 3.1)

Scientific classification
- Kingdom: Animalia
- Phylum: Chordata
- Class: Aves
- Order: Galliformes
- Family: Phasianidae
- Genus: Tragopan
- Species: T. satyra

Binomial name
- Tragopan satyra (Linnaeus, 1758)

Synonyms
- Meleagris satyra Linnaeus, 1758

= Satyr tragopan =

- Male

Species of bird

The satyr tragopan (Tragopan satyra) also known as the crimson horned pheasant, is a pheasant found in the Himalayan reaches of India, Tibet, Nepal and Bhutan. They reside in moist oak and rhododendron forests with dense undergrowth and bamboo clumps. They range from 2400 to 4200 meters in summer and 1800 meters in winter. The male is about 70 cm long.

When it is mating season, male satyr tragopans grow blue horns and a gular wattle. When ready to display, they will inflate their horns and hide behind a rock, waiting for females to pass by. When one does, they will perform an elaborate display in front of the females. At the end of the display, the male will stretch to his full height and show off all of his ornaments.

Females are brown. Males are usually red with blue, black, and white spots and freckles.

Although the least threatened of the tragopans, satyr tragopans still face many threats. The species is thought to have a moderately small population that is subject to hunting and habitat loss throughout most of its range.

== Taxonomy ==
In 1750 the English naturalist George Edwards included an illustration and a description of the satyr tragopan in the third volume of his A Natural History of Uncommon Birds. He used the English name "The Horned Indian Pheasant". Edwards based his hand-coloured etching on the head of the bird preserved in alcohol and a drawing of the whole bird that had both been sent to the physician Richard Mead in London. Edwards believed that the specimen had come from Bengal, but this is an error, the specimen probably came from Nepal.

When in 1758 the Swedish naturalist Carl Linnaeus updated his Systema Naturae for the tenth edition, he placed the satyr tragopan with the wild turkey in the genus Meleagris. Linnaeus included a brief description, coined the binomial name Meleagris satyra and cited Edwards' work. The satyr tragopan is now placed in the genus Tragopan that was introduced in 1829 by the French naturalist Georges Cuvier. The species is monotypic: no subspecies are recognised. The genus name is from Latin tragopan, a mythical horned purple-headed bird mentioned by the Roman authors Pliny and Pomponius Mela. The specific epithet satyra is from the Latin satyrus meaning "satyr", a Roman deity often depicted with horns.

== Gallery ==
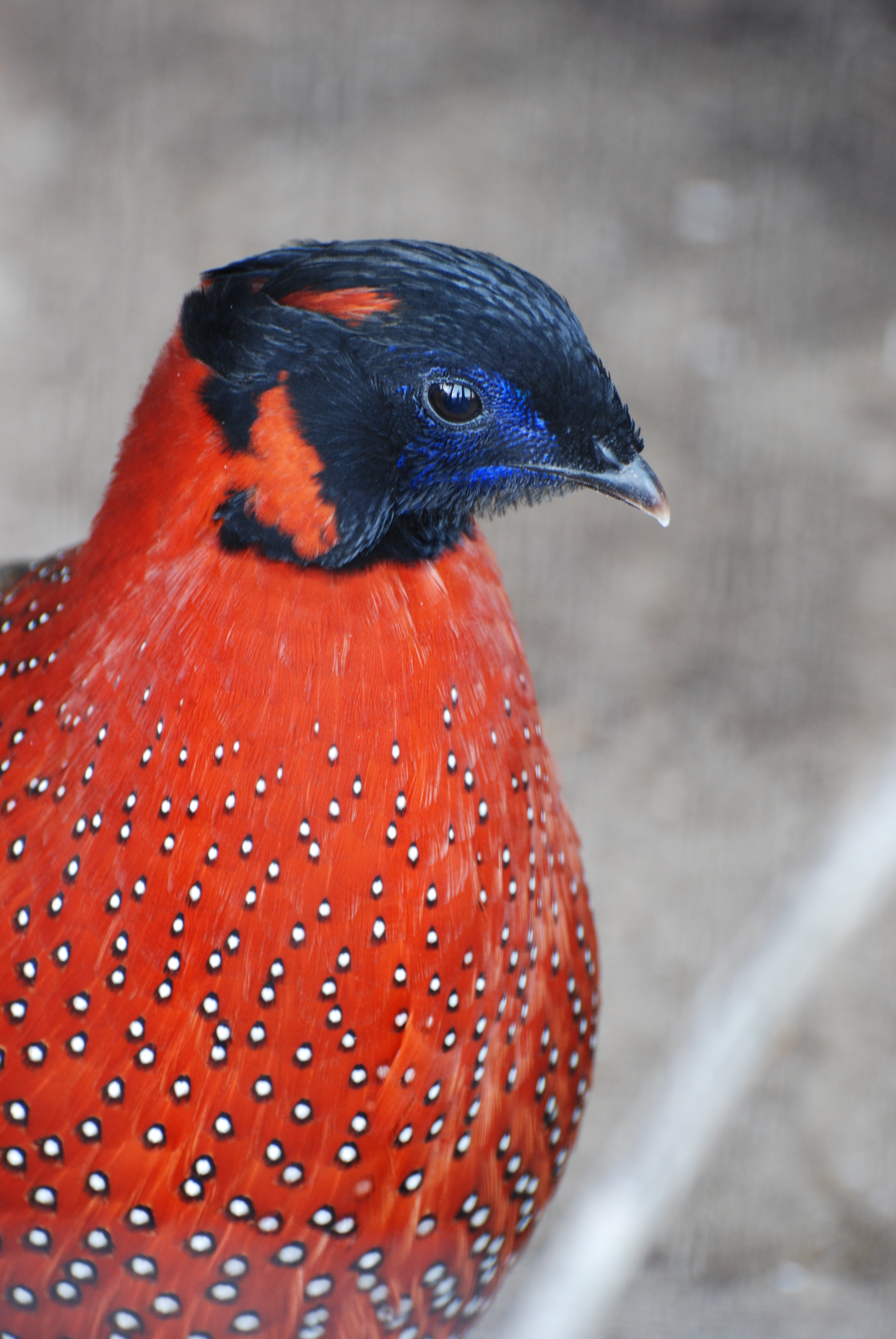
Captive bird from Osaka, Japan

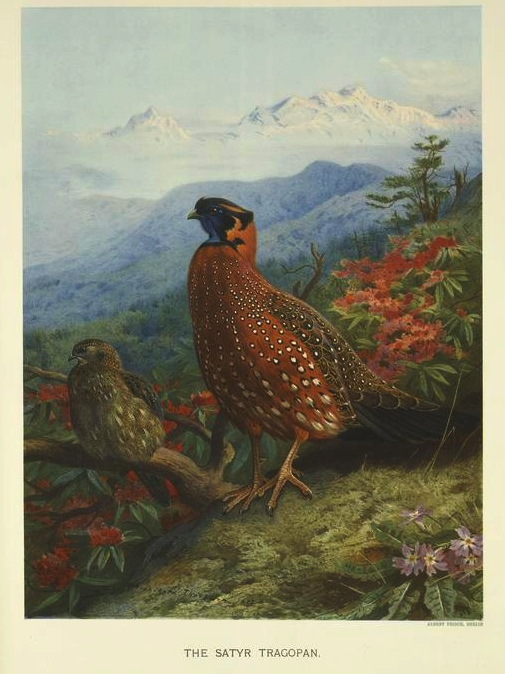

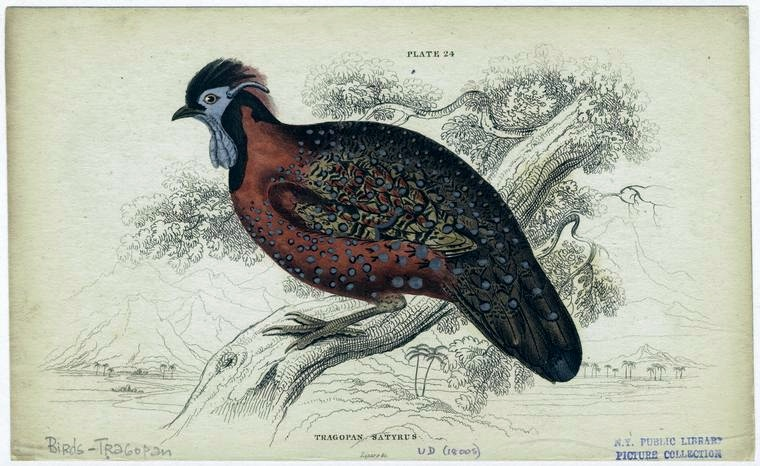

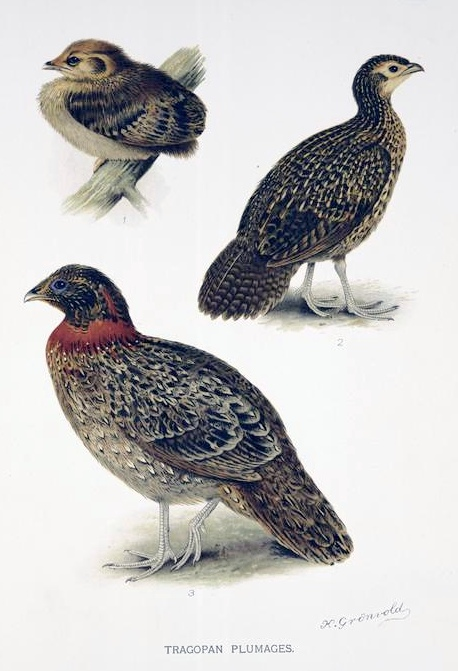

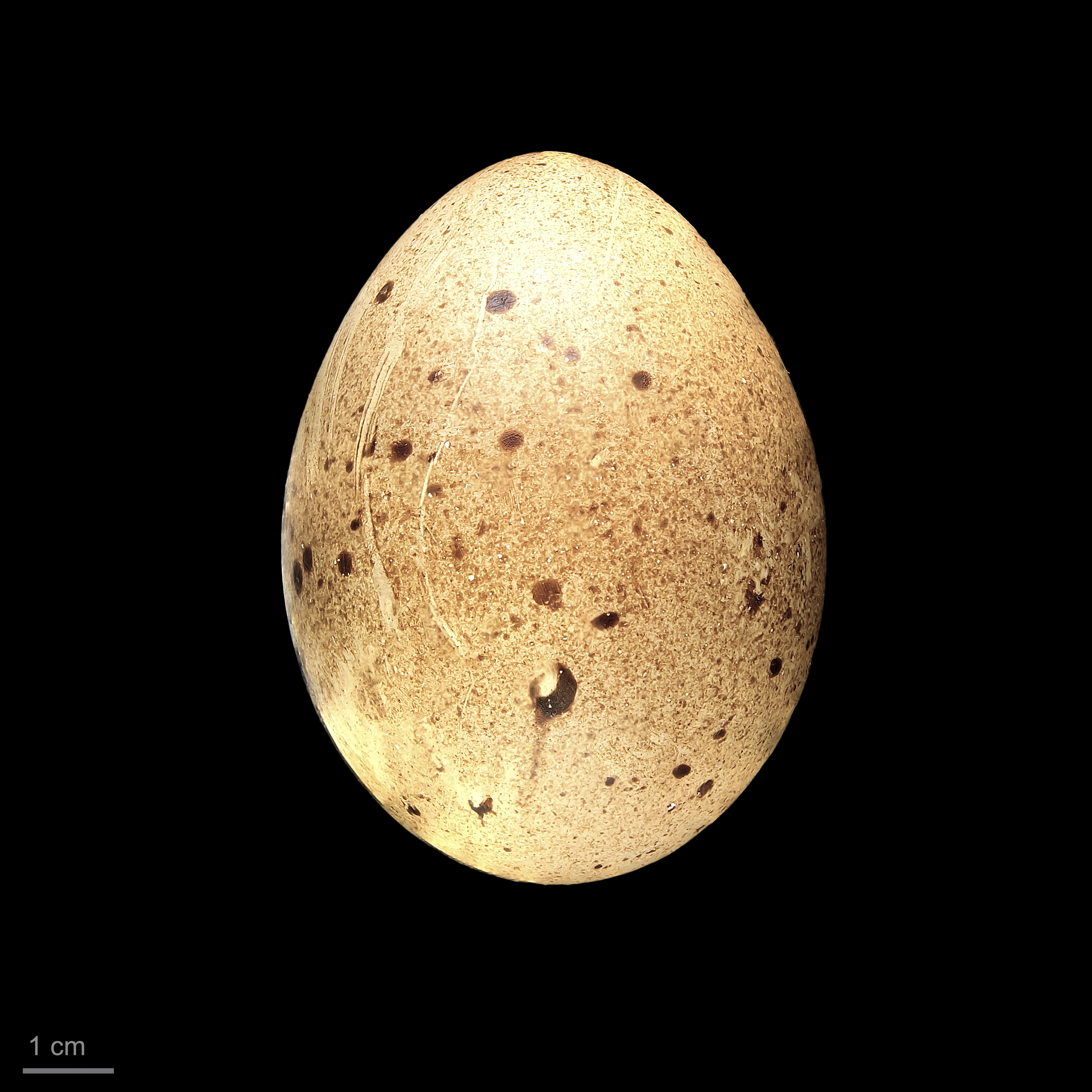
Egg

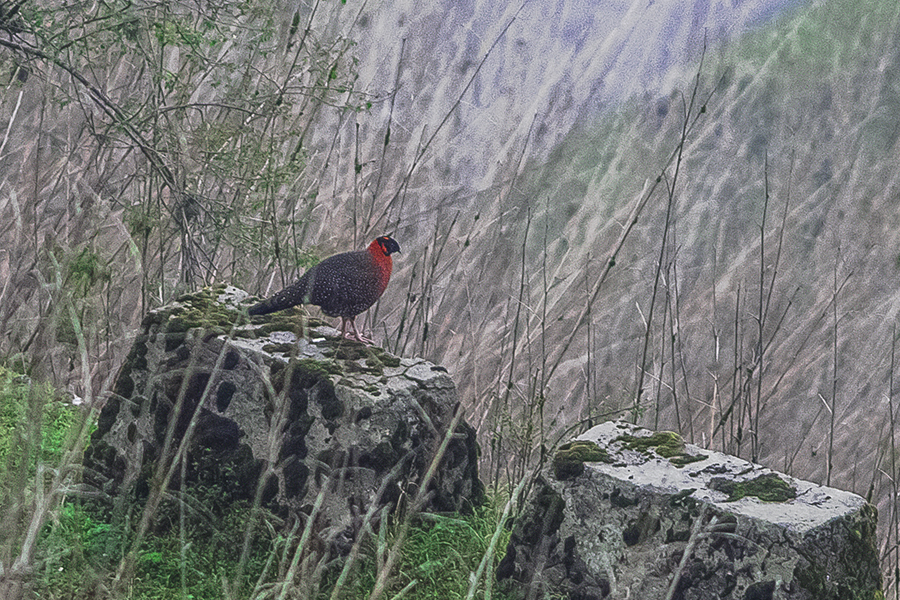
