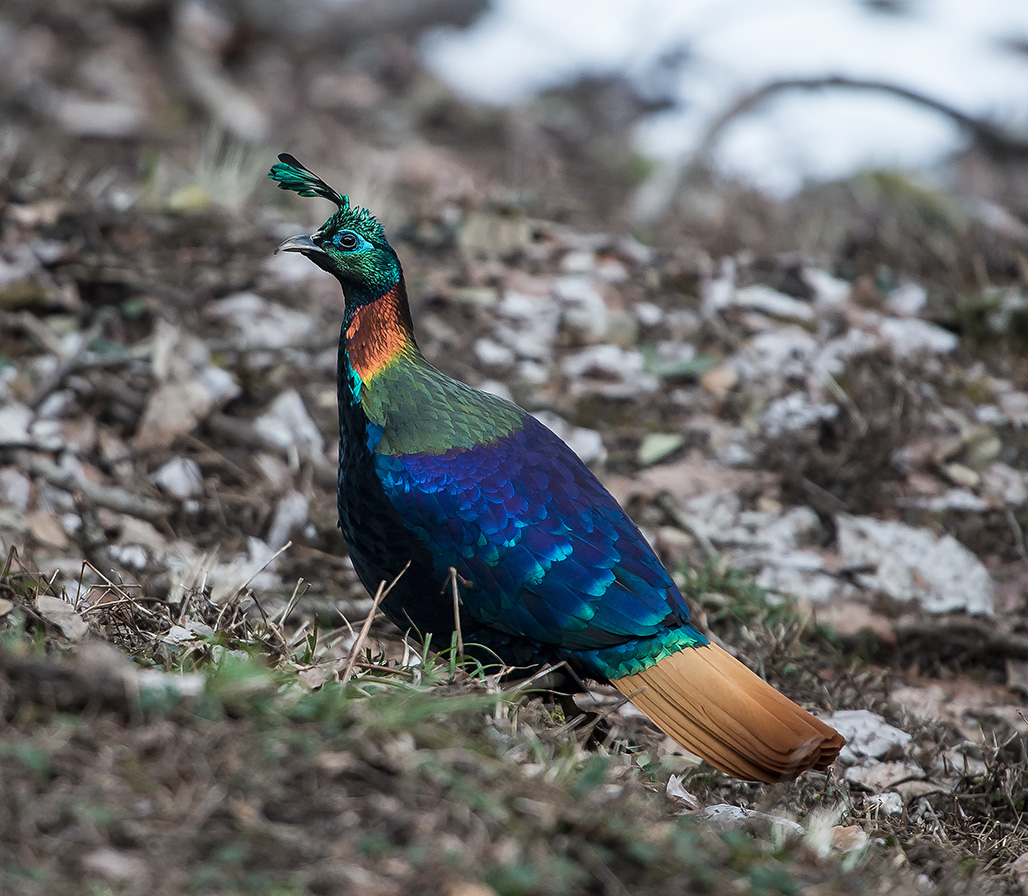
- Himalayan monal (Lophophorus impejanus)

Scientific classification
- Kingdom: Animalia
- Phylum: Chordata
- Class: Aves
- Order: Galliformes
- Family: Phasianidae
- Tribe: Lophophorini
- Genus: Lophophorus; Temminck, 1813

Type species
- Lophophorus refulgens = Phasianus impejanus Temminck, 1813

Species
- Lophophorus impejanus; Lophophorus lhuysii; Lophophorus sclateri

= Monal =

Genus of birds

A monal is a bird of genus Lophophorus of the pheasant family, Phasianidae.

== Description ==
The males all have colorful, iridescent plumage. Their physique is rather plump, and their diet consists of plants such as roots and bulbs and insects. During mating, the males are polygamous and mate with several females. The females in turn only mate with the selected male and enter into a monogamous relationship. Due to habitat destruction and hunting, they have become rare and their population is endangered.

== Species ==
There are three species and several subspecies:

Genus Lophophorus – Temminck, 1813 – three species
Common name	Scientific name and subspecies	Range	Size and ecology	IUCN status and estimated population
Himalayan monal Male Female	Lophophorus impejanus (Latham, 1790)	Afghanistan and Pakistan through the Himalayas in India, Nepal, southern Tibet, and Bhutan.	Size: Habitat: Diet:	LC
Sclater's monal Female	Lophophorus sclateri Jerdon, 1870 Three subspecies: L. s. arunachalensis (Kumar & Singh, 2004); L. s. orientalis (Davison G.W.H., 1974); L. s. sclateri (Jerdon, 1870)	northeast India, southeast Tibet and northern Burma	Size: Habitat: Diet:	VU
Chinese monal Male	Lophophorus lhuysii Geoffroy Saint-Hilaire, A, 1866	central China	Size: Habitat: Diet:	VU
