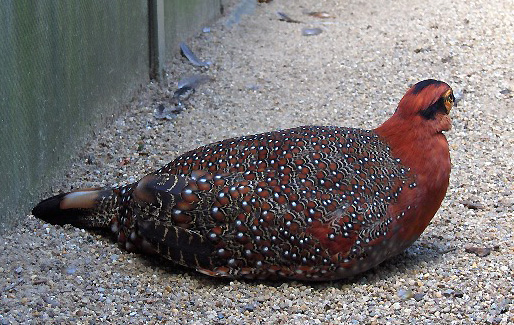

Conservation status
- Vulnerable (IUCN 3.1)
- CITES Appendix I

Scientific classification
- Kingdom: Animalia
- Phylum: Chordata
- Class: Aves
- Order: Galliformes
- Family: Phasianidae
- Genus: Tragopan
- Species: T. blythii

Binomial name
- Tragopan blythii (Jerdon, 1870)

= Blyth's tragopan =

Species of bird

Blyth's tragopan (Tragopan blythii) or the grey-bellied tragopan is a pheasant that is a vulnerable species. The common name commemorates Edward Blyth (1810–1873), English zoologist and Curator of the Museum of the Asiatic Society of Bengal. It is the state bird of Nagaland.

== Distribution and population ==
The pheasant-like bird's population is small and is believed to be decreasing at a rapid rate. Blyth's tragopan is located in many different areas, including Bhutan through north-east India, north Myanmar to south-east Tibet, and also China. These birds may travel up and down the slopes of the Himalayan mountains to find food, and based on seasonal temperature changes. The total population is estimated to be about 2,500 to 9,999 birds. This estimate is a very small number compared to some of its relative birds. Tragopan blythii normally flocks to wooded areas as it prefers the undergrowth of evergreen oak and rhododendron forests, and other dark, quiet places. This bird lives at a higher elevation than most birds.

== Taxonomy ==
Blyth's tragopan has two recognized subspecies:

- T. b. blythii (Jerdon, 1870) - Himalayas of northeastern India to southwest China and northern Myanmar
- T. b. molesworthi (E.C.S. Baker, 1914) - Molesworth's tragopan - eastern Bhutan

== Description ==
Blyth's tragopan pheasant is the largest of the genus Tragopan. Like most pheasants, the male is brightly colored. It is recognized by its rusty red head, yellow facial skin, and that it is spotted with small white dots on its back called ocelli. A black band extends from the base of the bill to the crown coupled with another black band extending behind the eyes. Like the rest of the tragopans, males have two pale blue horns that become erect during mating. Its lappet, a decorated flap, hangs from the throat and is brightly colored. This lappet can be expanded and exposed during mating season as well. Females are not as brightly colored as the male tragopan, for they do not need the extravagant appearance to attract a male counterpart. Overall, they are dark brown with a mixture of black, buff and white mottling. Their simple and dull look is a protection mechanism from other animals, known as camouflage. It also allows the females to protect their young that are in the early stages of life.

== Diet ==
Blyth's tragopan are generalists. In the wild, they consume seeds, berries, fruits, and buds. Captive birds usually consume insects, worms, and even small frogs. While they are primarily vegetarians, most birds have a predilection for berries and fruit.

== Behaviour ==
=== Migration ===
The bird primarily moves up and down the slopes in search for food. It is, however, uncommon for this species to travel far, due to the change in climate from area to area. This is a result of the mild winters in their habitat, which are tolerable for longer periods of time. For the majority of the species, travel is only necessary in attempting to avoid the drying out of their vegetation. In this case, they may move down mountain sides for more comfortable living conditions and a readier food supply. There is little information or support on how the Blyth's tragopan moves, but it is suggested that they travel together in groups of four to five, much like other species of tragopans.

== Reproduction ==
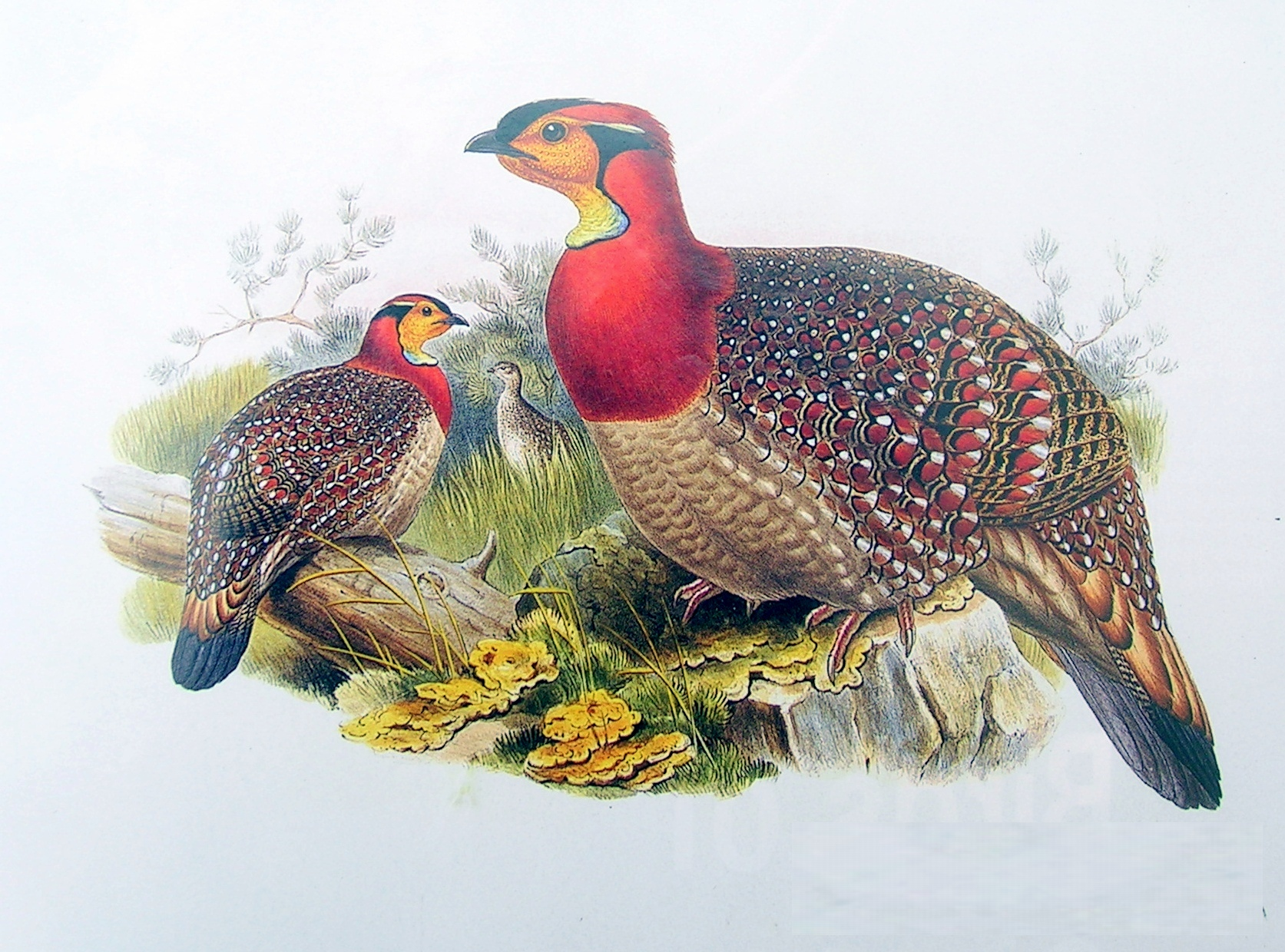

Blyth's tragopan starts mating in April and continues well into May. The males advertise themselves with flamboyant displays to attract females.

=== Courtship ritual ===
Mating display may involve bowing and scraping the ground with their wings slightly raised and their flesh horns fully dilated while projected forward. The more flamboyant and extravagant the male acts, the more likely they are to attract a female. If the female does not respond, the male intensifies this wild behavior to draw more attention to him. The male then proceeds to strut around the female, in an attempt to distract the female. He then continues the movements with his breast pushed forward and his wings extended into the air.

=== Growth and development ===
After a female becomes fertilised, she can lay up to two to five eggs. The incubation period for eggs lasts for about twenty-eight days. After hatching, the offspring has a similar appearance to the female hen. The male tragopans acquire red on their neck during the first spring moult. During the second year of life, full adult plumage is attained in the tragopan.

=== Nesting ===
While no nests have been found in the wild, the natives of Nagaland have stated that the nests are never on the ground, but are found in trees, stumps, and small bushes. This record is consistent with the birds' desire to stay at high altitudes. The heights range from six to twenty feet above the ground. Nesting above the ground is advantageous because the seasonal rains are intensified to where flooding can sweep away all the vegetation that is found on the ground. The nests are made of sticks with a lining of smaller vegetation such as grass or weeds.

== Threats ==
In north-east India, deforestation is a major factor in the decreasing population of T. blythii, as the forests are the main source of food. By removing this source, the pheasants are left with little or no food to consume. In addition, its primary habitat is in the forest.

Overexploitation is one of the biggest threats to all birds including Blyth's tragopan. Twelve percent of bird species are threatened to extinction and overexploitation. Blyth's tragopans are considered to be the main threat to thirty seven percent of that number. Overexploitation reduces the population of the species and causes the listing of eleven percent of the threatened birds on the IUCN Red List. The biggest concern is the eleven critically endangered species for which overexploitation is believed to be the factor that the population numbers are declining.

In Nagaland and Arunachal Pradesh, the pheasant is being hunted for food with large-scale snaring and are also regularly shot with guns and slingshots. According to the local tribes of eastern Nagaland the bird has become locally extinct in many of their forests where it was found commonly. The major reason for decline in population in Nagaland is over hunting.

High levels of grazing and slash and burn agriculture in Bhutan are also significant threats. The effect of slash and burn techniques has a significant effect on the species because it takes away the entire habitat that the bird has. The population of the tragopan is believed to be declining because of these threats which are also dividing up the populations into smaller subpopulations due to fragmentation.

Fragmentation is an issue because it divides larger populations into smaller ones over a large area. The tragopans are not able to go from one area to the other because there are normally great distances between these populations. Fragmentation also does not let the pheasants get the genetic variation that they need. In order for them not to have problems with the hatchlings they need to have a diversity of different species.

== Conservation ==
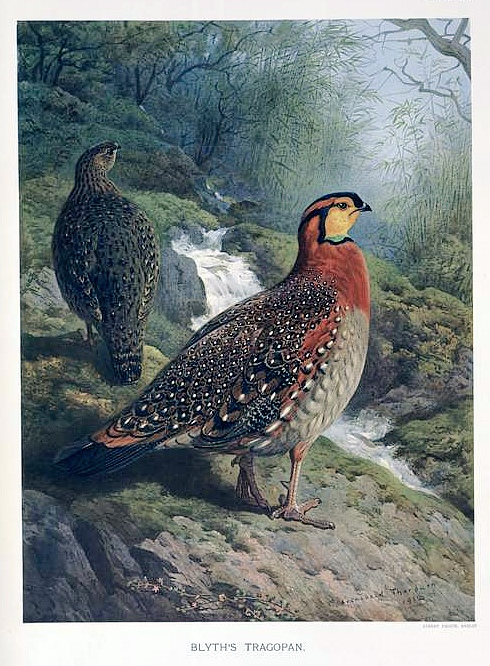

It is the state bird of Nagaland. There is already some habitat set aside for the T. blythii to survive. These areas include two wildlife sanctuaries and a small reserve in Nagaland, along with some other small areas for the bird to survive.

This species is legally protected in all countries in which it is found. Conservation awareness plans need to be implemented in all areas and more people to enforce the laws that are already set in place. With these small sub communities, which are scattered over the habitat areas of the pheasant, it is becoming more and more difficult for the birds to reproduce with the genetic differences they need to survive.

The Blue Mountain National Park in Mizoram, India is currently taking surveys of how many different Blyth's tragopan can be heard and seen in the area. The population was considered to be about 500 and 5000. The continuing monetization for the Blyth's tragopan is essential for the conservation management aspect of the pheasant. Together with Blue Mountain and the organization proposal there will be a way to help the Blyth's tragopan.
