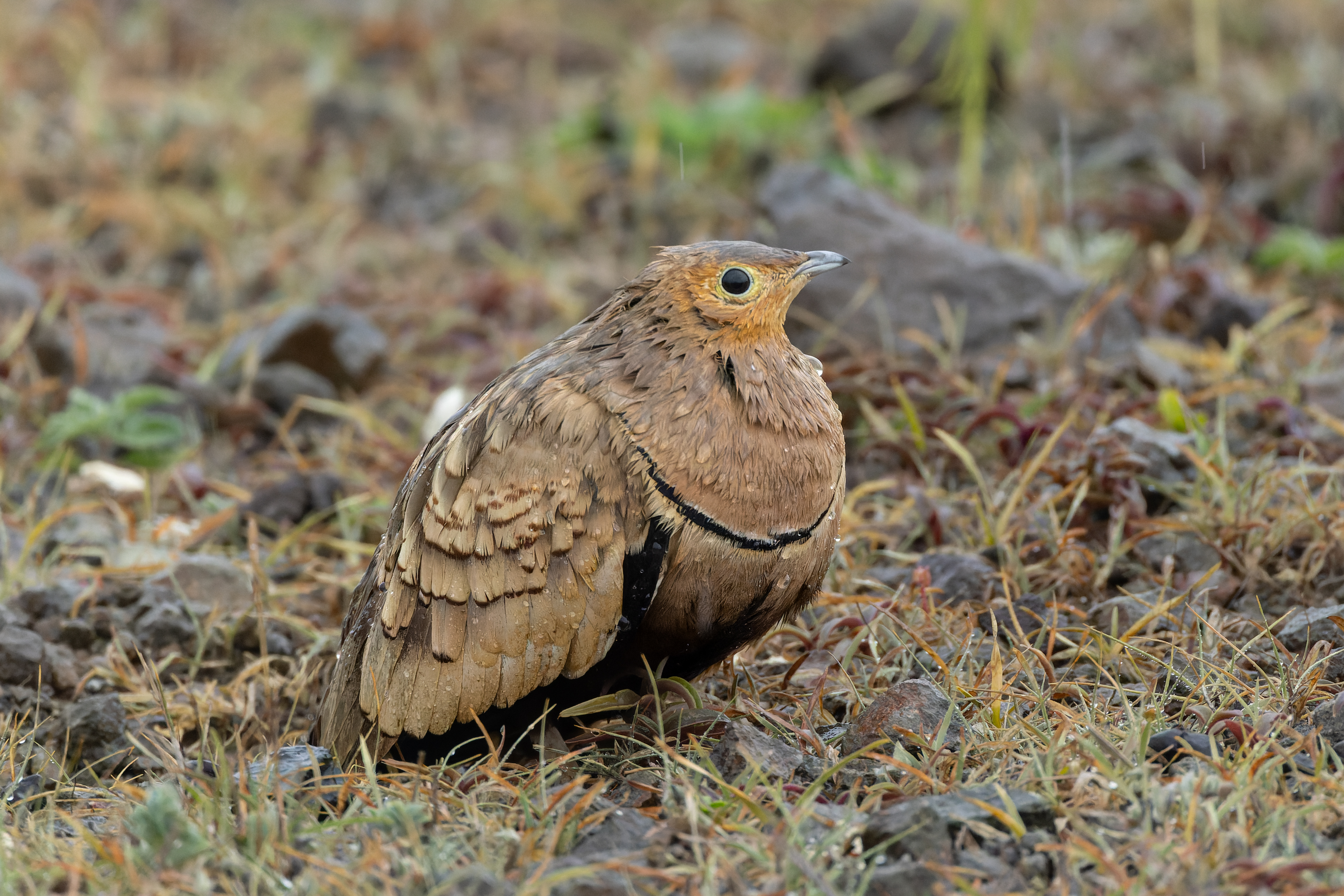
- Male in Bhigwan, Maharashtra, India.
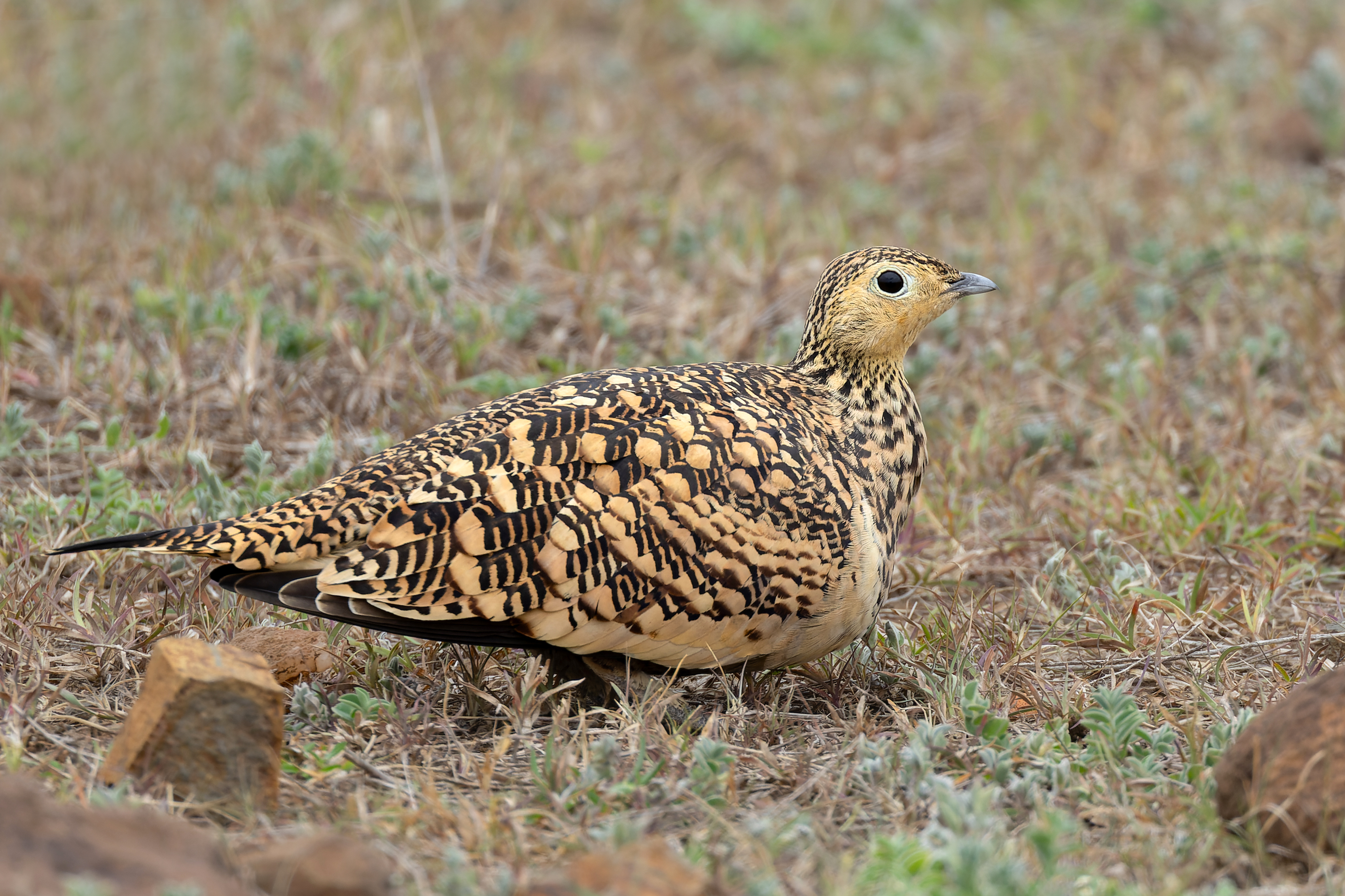
- Female in Bhigwan, Maharashtra, India.

Conservation status
- Least Concern (IUCN 3.1)

Scientific classification
- Kingdom: Animalia
- Phylum: Chordata
- Class: Aves
- Order: Pterocliformes
- Family: Pteroclidae
- Genus: Pterocles
- Species: P. exustus

Binomial name
- Pterocles exustus Temminck, 1825

= Chestnut-bellied sandgrouse =

Species of bird

The chestnut-bellied sandgrouse or common sandgrouse (Pterocles exustus) is a species of sandgrouse. It is a sedentary and nomadic species that ranges from northern and central Africa and further east towards western and southern Asia. There are six recognized subspecies.

The chestnut-bellied sandgrouse is sexually dimorphic in plumage colouration and varies in overall plumage colouration between the six subspecies.

The chestnut-bellied sandgrouse is a bird of barren, semi-deserts. It is heavily reliant on water, despite living in hot, arid climates and is known to travel up to 50 miles (80 kilometres) in a day to search for water.

Chestnut-bellied sandgrouse are selective feeders which primarily subsist on seeds, often preferring to consume small seeds in large amounts.

== Taxonomy ==
The chestnut-bellied sandgrouse is a species of sandgrouse placed in the genus Pterocles. Sandgrouse belong to the family Pteroclididae, which belongs to the order Pteroclidiformes. This means they are more closely related to pigeons and doves and are not a type of grouse.

There are six recognised subspecies of chestnut-bellied sandgrouse:

- P. ex. exustus: Senegal, Gambia, Mauritania and Sudan.
- P. e. floweri: endemic to the Nile Valley of Egypt and thought to be extinct until its rediscovery in 2012.
- P. e. ellioti: southeastern Sudan, eastern Eritrea, northern Ethiopia and Somalia.
- P. e. olivascens: southeastern South Sudan, southwestern Ethiopia, Kenya and Northern Tanzania.
- P. e. erlangeri: southwestern Saudi Arabia, Yemen and Oman.
- P. e. hindustan: southeastern eastern Iran, Pakistan and India.

== Description ==
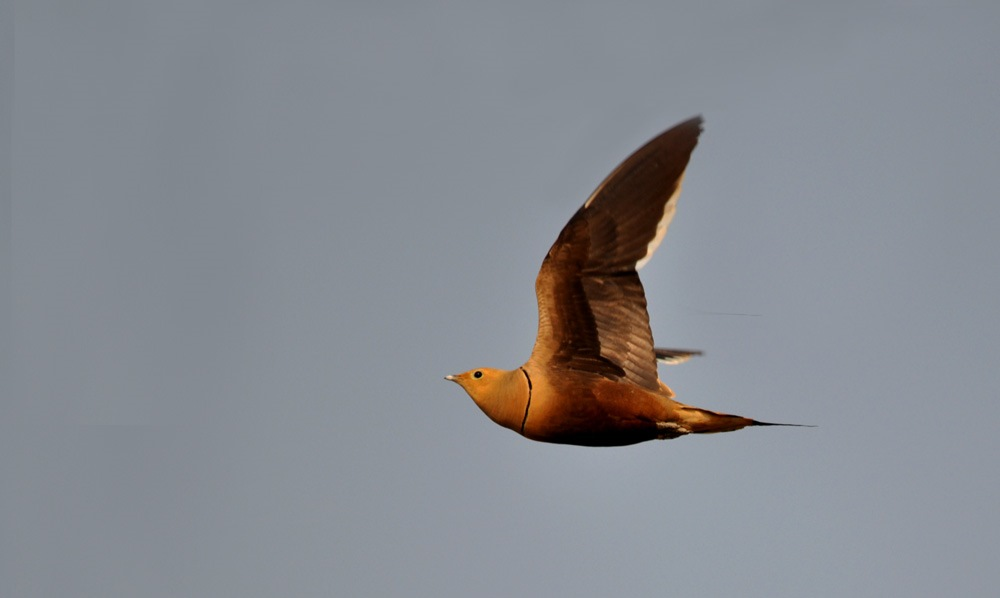
A male chestnut-bellied sandgrouse in flight

The birds appear as small to medium-sized, brownish sandgrouses with an elongated and pointed tail when in flight. When grounded, they appear as very short-legged birds, with a small head. They will stretch out their long necks when wary. There are six recognised subspecies of chestnut-bellied sandgrouse. The overall plumage colouration varies between the six subspecies. The subspecies that inhabits the Nile Valley (P. e. floweri) have darker and greyer colouration on their heads, mantle and breasts and have less yellowish colouration on the upper wing-coverts and scapulars than the nominate subspecies, Pterocles exustus exustus (Senegal, Gambia, Mauritania and Sudan). P. e. ellioti (southeastern Sudan, to Somalia), P. e. erlangeri (southwestern Saudi Arabia, Yemen and Oman) and P. e. hindustan (Iran, Pakistan and India) are all paler and greyer than the nominate subspecies. P. e. olivascens (South Sudan to Northern Tanzania) has distinct greyer olive colouration on their upperparts and wings, with females having more heavily barred and streaked underparts than the nominate subspecies.

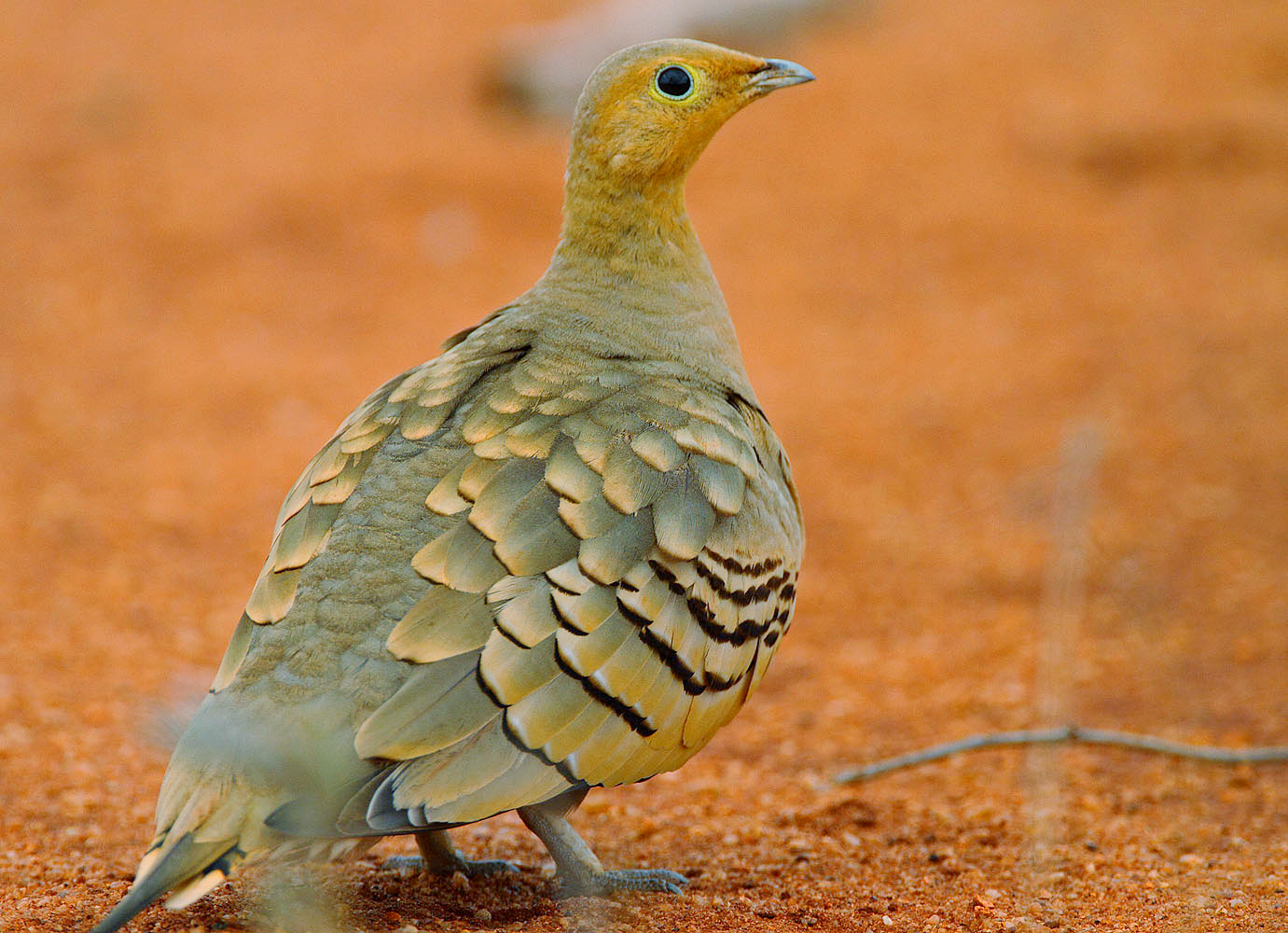
A male chestnut-bellied sandgrouse grounded, on the burnt ochre soils of Tsavo

There are six recognised subspecies of chestnut-bellied sandgrouse. The overall plumage colouration varies between the six subspecies. The subspecies, Pterocles exustus floweri that inhabits the Nile Valley have darker and greyer colouration on their heads, mantle and breasts and have less yellowish colouration on the upper wing-coverts and scapulars than the nominate subspecies, P. e. exustus (Senegal, Gambia, Mauritania and Sudan). P. e. ellioti (southeastern Sudan, to Somalia), P. e. erlangeri (southwestern Saudi Arabia, Yemen and Oman) and Pterocles exustus Hindustan (Iran, Pakistan and India) are all paler and greyer than the nominate subspecies. P. e. olivascens (South Sudan to Northern Tanzania) has distinct greyer olive colouration on their upperparts and wings, with females having more heavily barred and streaked underparts than the nominate subspecies.

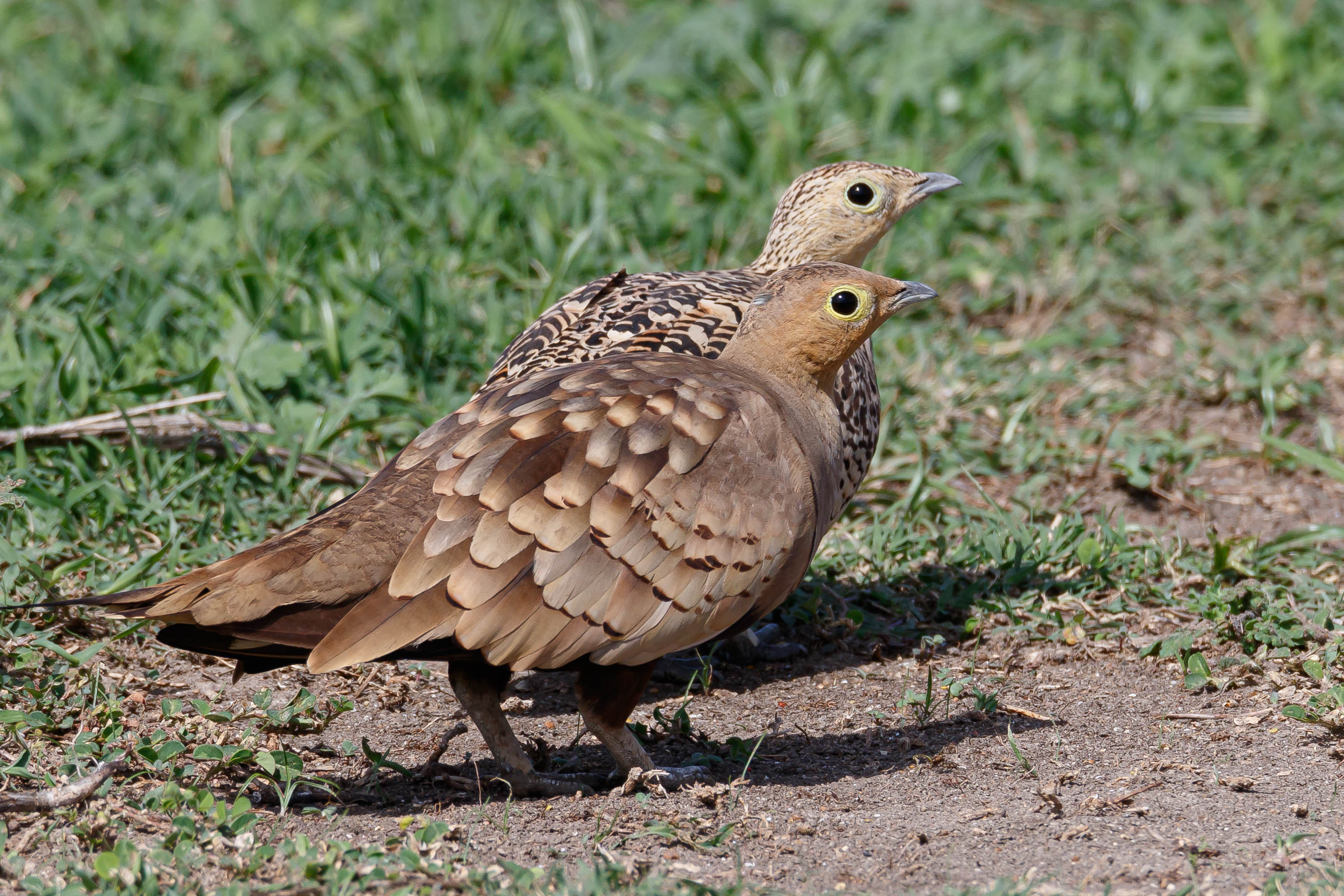
A pair (male in the foreground, female behind) showing the sexual dimorphism in their plumage

The chestnut-bellied sandgrouse is sexually dimorphic in colouration. The subspecies that is found in abundance in the Thar and Sindh Deserts is easily distinguishable by plumage colouration. The male's upper parts, from the crown to upper tail are a covert isabelline-grey/brown colour. The lores, cheeks, chin, and throat are a dull yellow-ochre and often tinged with orange-buff that extends around the neck like a collar and shading off towards the scapular and interscapular feathers, shading into ocherous-buff at the tips and edged with brown. The wing feathers are a buff or ocherous-buff shading into olive towards the inner bottom wing. The bird's upper breast is a vinous-buff and separated by a narrow band of black boarded with white. The lower breast has a dull yellow-buff that changes gradually into a chocolate colour, with the centre of the abdomen is black. The under tail and tarsus in a creamy-buff. The centre tail is the same isabelline-grey/brown as the upper tail feathers, becoming black towards the prolonged narrow portions. The female's upper plumage is a dull-buff streaked with dark brown marks at the back of the neck, increasing to blotches, with other parts becoming broad bars. The wing feathers are the same as the back, but the feathers are tipped broadly with buff, with some coverts edged with brown. The neck, breast and sides of the head are vinous in colour, with black spots. The lower breast is a dull pale ochre-buff, with the abdomen to the vent closely barred with dark brown. And the under-tail covert feathers are creamy buff.

The subspecies P. e. floweri, which inhabits the Nile Valley, are easily distinguishable between the sexes. The males tend to have an orange tone around their necks and faces, with sharp demarcated black lines across the pale upper breast. The male's face and throat are a yellowish colour, faintly contrasted with a greyish crown, neck and breast. The breast and neck of the females are heavily mottled with brown and white, lacking the black lines across the breast that the males possess.

== Distribution and habitat ==
The chestnut-bellied sandgrouse is found across most of northern and central Africa and further east towards western and southern Asia. These birds are wide-stretching, inhibiting mostly the Afrotropic and Indomalayan biogeographic realms. The chestnut-bellied sandgrouse tends to prefer bare, bushy arid and sandy plains as its habitat.

The chestnut-bellied sandgrouse that can be found in India is found most abundantly in the Thar or Sindh Desert. During the summer, where water is scarce, these birds often can be found conglomerating at a single waterhole to drink in their thousands. During the rainy seasons, when water is more plentiful, the birds tend to travel in smaller flocks.

In Egypt, a subspecies (floweri) of chestnut-bellied sandgrouse was first discovered in the mid-19th century, and are found endemically in the Nile Valley. In the late 19th century, it was the most abundant species of sandgrouse inhabiting Egypt, but by 1929, they were already found to be scarce.Before being rediscovered in 2012, the last and most recent recorded observation was from 4 March 1979. The subspecies was rediscovered by a team of Austrian and German ornithologists while working in the Egyptian Nile valley in March 2012.

== Behaviour ==
The chestnut-bellied sandgrouse is sedentary, unlike most species of sandgrouse who are migratory. However, the species exhibits extensive local movements. During the summer, when water is scarce, the birds will move to nearby areas where water is still available. The birds also appear to periodically move over long distances based on the availability of food supplies.

=== Diet and feeding ===
The chestnut-bellied sandgrouse, like all species of sandgrouse, feeds on small seeds, small insects and fallen berries. Their diet primarily consists of small seeds, often consumed in large quantities, mostly from leguminous plants. The environment these birds tend to inhabit is often arid, and water is scarce. However, these birds water regularly every day and will tend to concentrate around available water sources. They prefer to water once a day at sunrise but have been observed to water a second time before sunset, although this is less common.

=== Breeding ===
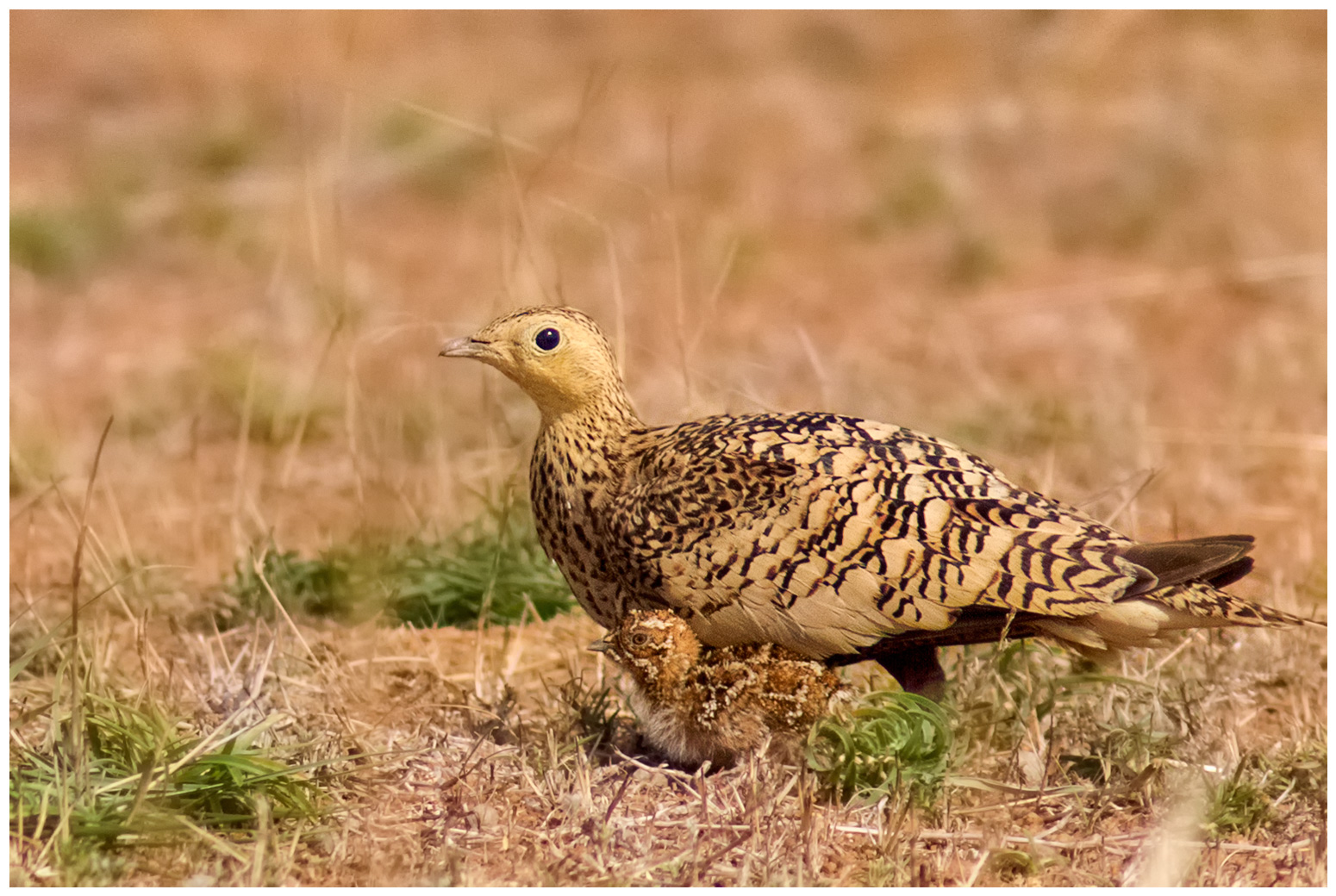
Chicks, like this one with its mother in India, are precocious, and leave the nest soon after hatching.

Chestnut-bellied sandgrouse are sexually mature after one year following hatching. There is no information on the life span of the birds in the wild, but wild-trapped adult birds have survived up to 3 years in captivity in Nevada. During the breeding season, males will be in new fresh brightly coloured plumage and will possess distinctive elongated central tail feathers. Females are courted with short chases and low vocalisation, and are often courted by several males at once, but will be quickly followed by one male, only after a short period. The females will lay around three to six eggs in nests built into shallow scrapings in the ground when in captivity. In the Thar and Sindh desserts, the birds also nest in shallow depressions scratched into the ground but with three eggs per nest. The nests are built out in the open with no attempts of hiding the nests. The eggs of the sandgrouses commonly found in the Thar and Sindh deserts appear to be pale grey-stone or yellowish-stone in colour, covered in small blotches and spots of varying shades of brown, with grey and lavender coloured secondary markings. The eggs have an average size of 36.8 mm × 26.2 mm (1.45 in × 1.03 in). In captivity, incubation is done mainly by the female, with all the young hatching simultaneously after the end of the incubation period. In the wild, males have been observed to incubate at night. Once hatched, the chicks will remain near the nest for the first day or two. In the Thar and Sindh deserts, hatchings are precocious and would leave the nest shortly after hatching.

=== Predators and threats ===
The chestnut-bellied sandgrouse appears to be highly resilient against diseases. It is not susceptible to Newcastle disease or fowlpox, and seems to be relatively resistant to common communicable diseases of poultry. Though it is known to host parasites like pinworms, such infestations are exceedingly rare.

Falcons are known to hunt chestnut-bellied sandgrouse at waterholes in India.

== Relationship with humans ==
=== Hunting ===
The species was introduced by the Nevada state game department into Hawaii as a trial run to see if they would be suitable as a recreational game species in Nevada. The birds were introduced to the islands of Hawaii, Molokai, and Kauai between 1961 and 1962.

The species was released in Japan, in Pahranagat Valley, Pahrump Valley and Moapa Valley. The birds that were released in Pahranagat Valley in 1960 left immediately and no further attempts to release the species there were made. The birds were released in Pahrump and Moapa Valleys springs of 1960 and 1961. During each release, there was an initial exodus of birds, but a few remained throughout the summer to early fall. But all eventually left during the winter periods.

There were reports of two sandgrouses, both from the 1960 and 1961 releases respectively in Pahrump Valley, who were shot at Navajoa, Sonora, Mexico on February 10, 1962. This indicates that these birds may have migrated towards the desert regions south of their initial release locations.

=== In captivity ===
Despite being attractive birds, they are rarely kept in captivity. This low availability may be due in part to their flightiness and the difficulties of establishing them in captivity. A study published in 2008 found that the major contributing factor to the mortality rates of birds in captivity comes from social stress and the flightiness of this species. The study investigated 50 dead chestnut-bellied sandgrouse in the Al Wabra preservation, through autopsies, they found that 38% of the birds died from trauma, namely head trauma as they were flying into the wire mesh of their enclosures. Another major cause of the mortalities in these birds came from emaciation. These occurred the most in chicks, as 12% of the animals had died as a result of emaciation. However, the adults were found to have poor body conditions, and it was correlated to any chronic diseases. This indicated that one of the main causes of death was stress.

Attempts by the State of Nevada to breed these birds in captivity between 1959 and 1961 had failed. Breeding experiments were attempted on the Utah State Game Farm at Price, Utah, and resulted in only one egg laid by the end of 1962.

== External sources ==
- Saint Louis Zoo
