= Bhigwan =

Village in Maharashtra, India

- Village
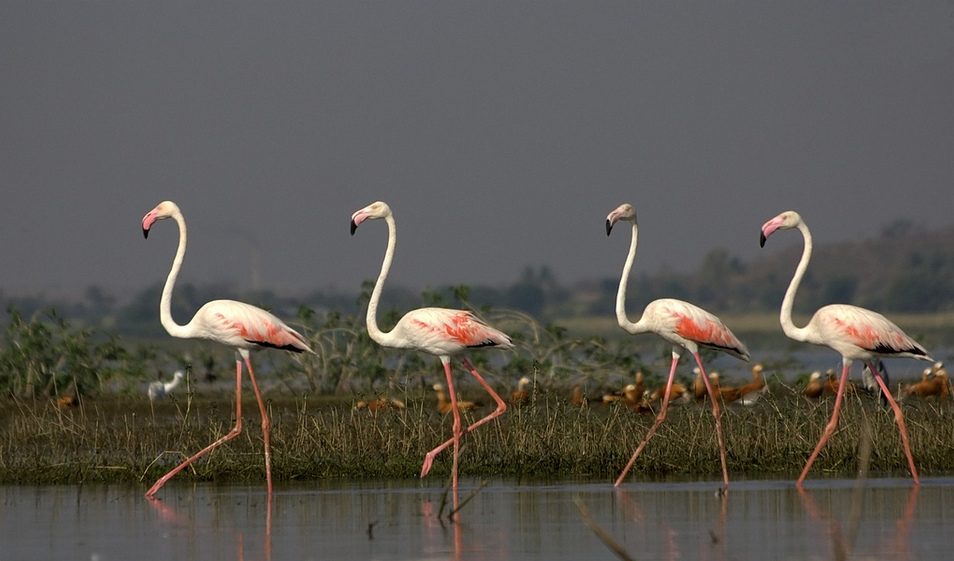
- Flamingo birds

- Location in Maharashtra, India Bhigwan (India)
- Coordinates: 18°17′58″N 074°45′16″E
- Country: India
- State: Maharashtra
- District: Pune
- Taluka: Indapur
- Established: 1978

Government
  - Body: Village panchayat

Languages
  - Official: Marathi
- Time zone: UTC+5:30 (IST)
- Postal code: 413130
- Website: www.birdsofbhigwan.com

Bhigwan is a town on the border of the Ahilyanagar, Pune and Solapur districts in the Indian state of Maharashtra. Bhigwan is famous for birdwatching, especially flamingos and wildlife photography. It is also famous for its fishes and the authentic Maharashtrian 'Machhi Thali'.

== Geography ==
It is located on the Pune-Solapur Highway around 100 km from Pune on the backwaters of the Ujani Dam. The distance between Solapur and Bhigwan is 151 km. It is also known as mini Bharatpur.

The Ujani Dam is constructed on the Bhima River. The water of the dam has created a shallow wetland and hosts many birds, which serves as an important hotspot for amateur and avid birders.

== Fauna ==
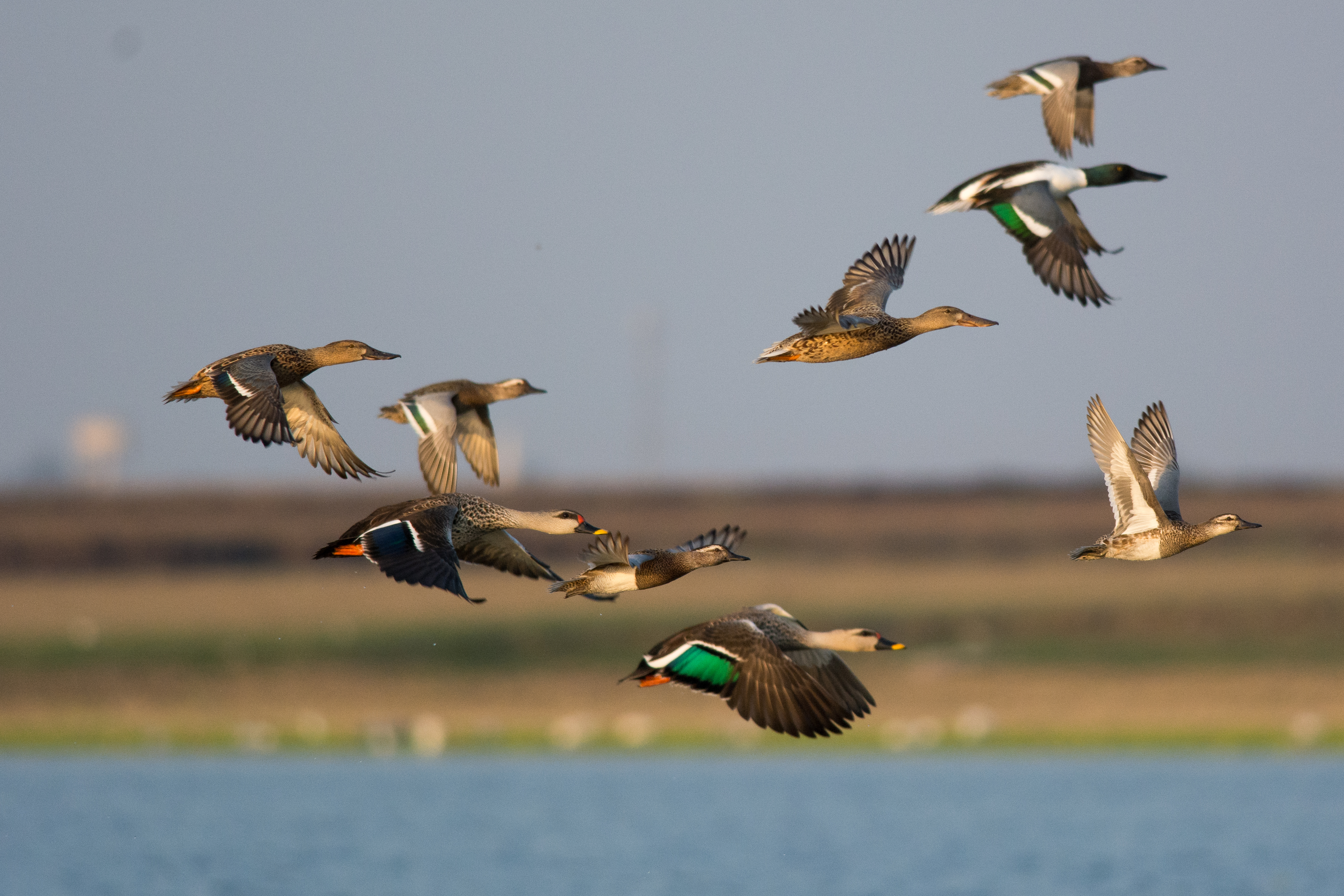
Indian spot-billed duck, shovellers, garganeys in Bhigwan

At Bhigwan, ducks, herons, egrets, raptors and waders along with flocks of hundreds of flamingos are present. At times, 1,000–1,200 flamingos are seen. Low rainfall and low water levels have reduced the birds' numbers. More than 230 species of migratory birds are found here, including painted storks, bar-headed geese and demoiselle cranes. These birds are present in the winter season between December and March. The birds generally migrate via marine routes and adult females depart from the breeding grounds.

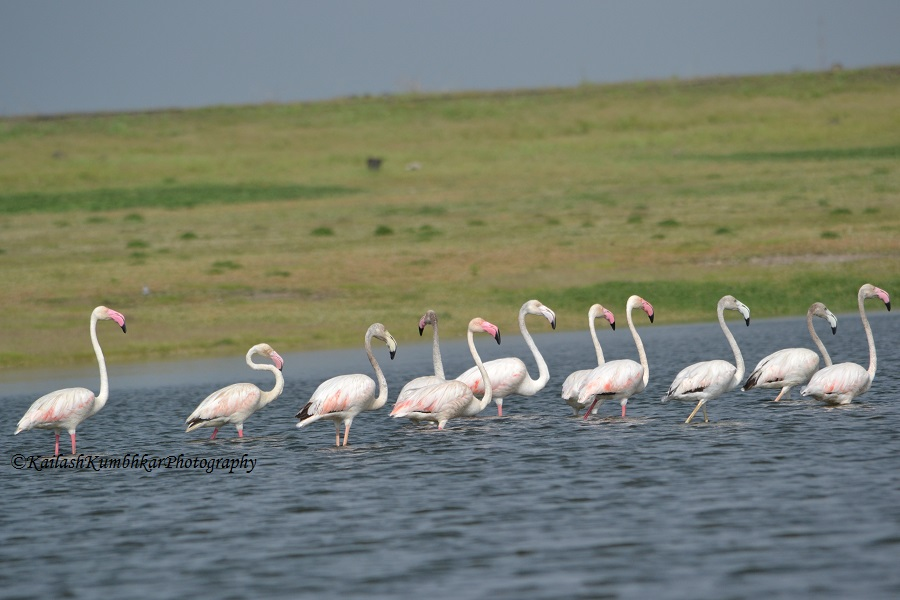
Flamingos in Bhigwan

The backwaters of Ujjani Dam host the greater flamingo, Eurasian spoonbill, bar-headed goose, collared pratincole and osprey. Bhigwan hosts the fastest bird of the animal kingdom, the peregrine falcon.

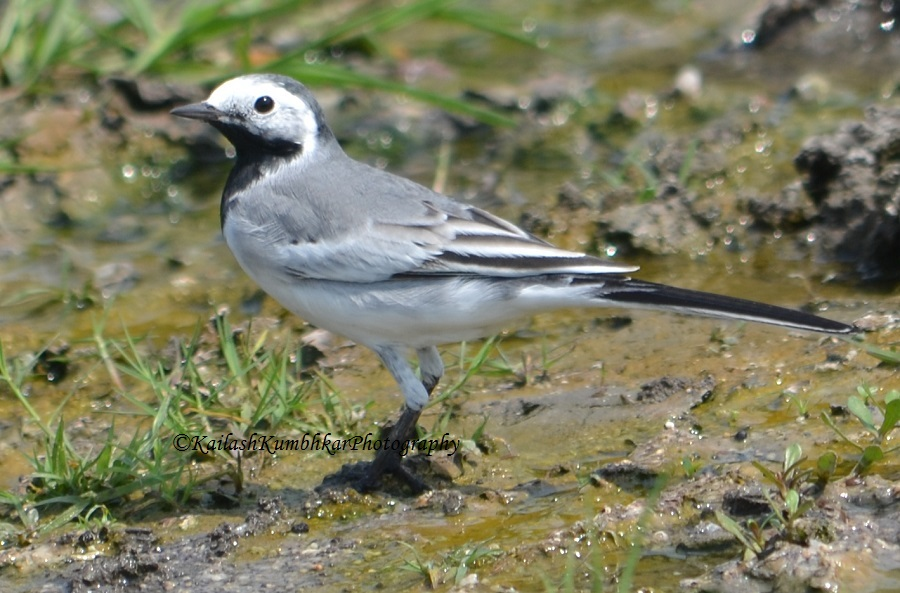
White wagtail

The dry grasslands, woodlands, swamps, wetlands and backwaters of Bhigwan are the habitat for many species of fish, amphibians, lizards and snakes.

== Transport ==
Visitors can either travel to Bhigwan by the State Transport Buses bound for Solapur and onwards from Pune, which takes approximately 3.5 hours or can travel in their own vehicles. The main birding spots are as far away as 5 to 10 km from Bhigwan's main town.

One can also travel via train from Pune. There is a list of trains stop at Bhigwan such as Chennai Mail (11027), Pune Sur Demu, Hyderabad Express (17031) and Shidheshwar Express (12115). The fastest way to reach Solapur from Bhigwan is via taxi, which takes approximately 2.5 hours.

Bhigwan is approximately 25 km away from Baramati.

== Best time to visit ==
The best time to visit Bhigwan is between the months of December and March. Flamingos prefer the winter season as they require water-bodies of shallow depths for fishing. There are several village home-stays for tourists.

== See also ==
- Bhuleshwar Temple
