= Bhuleshwar Temple =

Hindu Shiva temple in Maharashtra, India

- भुलेश्वर
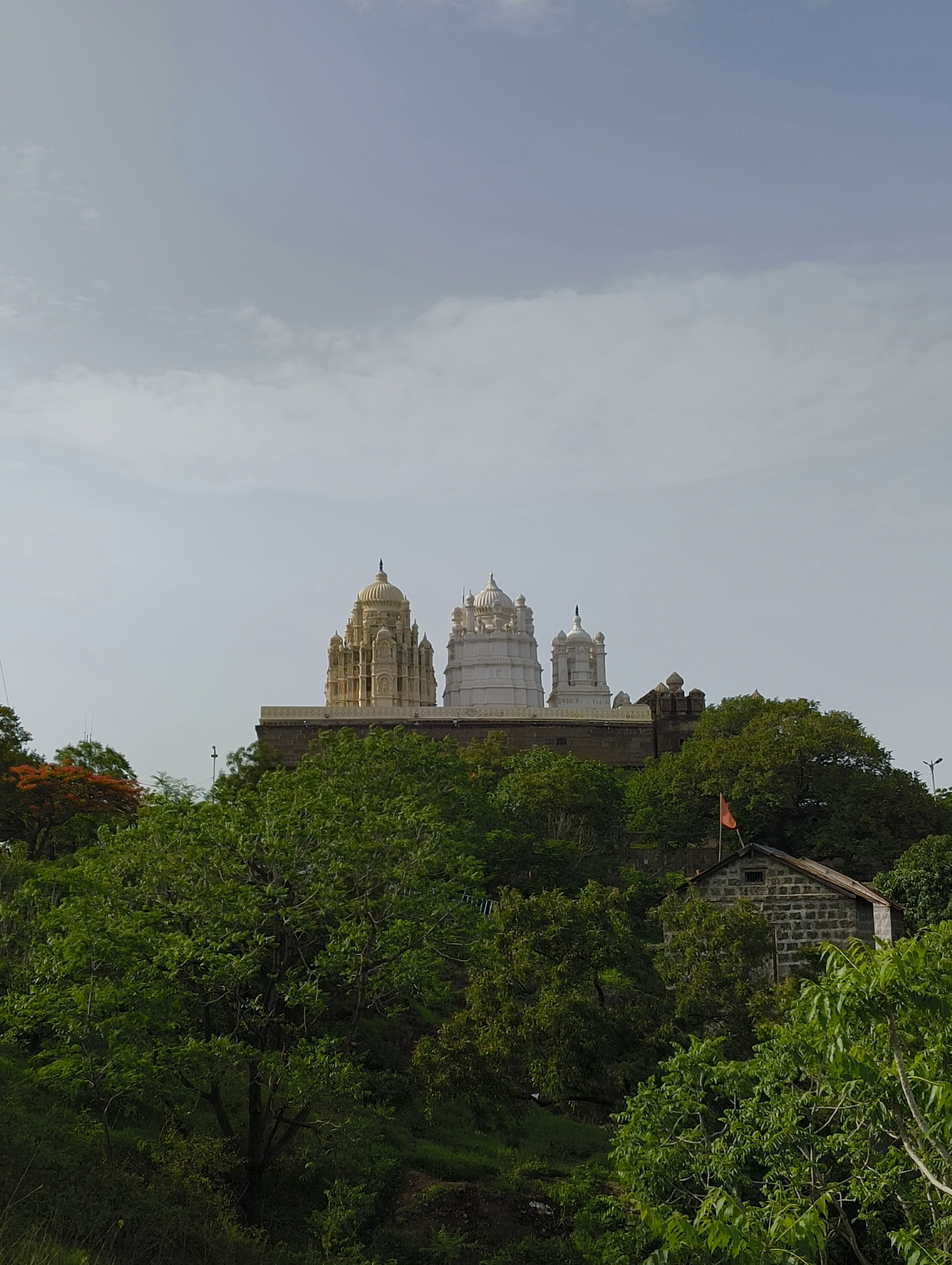
- Shiv temple

- Location in Maharashtra

Religion
- Affiliation: Hinduism
- District: Pune
- Deity: Shiva
- Festival: Maha Shivratri

Location
- Location: Malshiras
- State: Maharashtra
- Country: India
- Interactive map of Bhuleshwar Temple
- Coordinates: 18.435874°N 74.241081°E

Architecture
- Materials: Basalt, lime mortar

The Bhuleshwar Temple is a Hindu temple of Shiva, situated around 45 kilometres from Pune and 10 km from Pune-Solapur highway from Yawat in Maharashtra, India. The temple is situated on a hill and was built in the 8th century. There are classical carvings on the walls. It has been declared as a protected monument.

The temple is also known for the folk-tale about it, when a bowl of sweet (pedhas) is offered to the Shiva Ling, one or more of the sweets disappear.

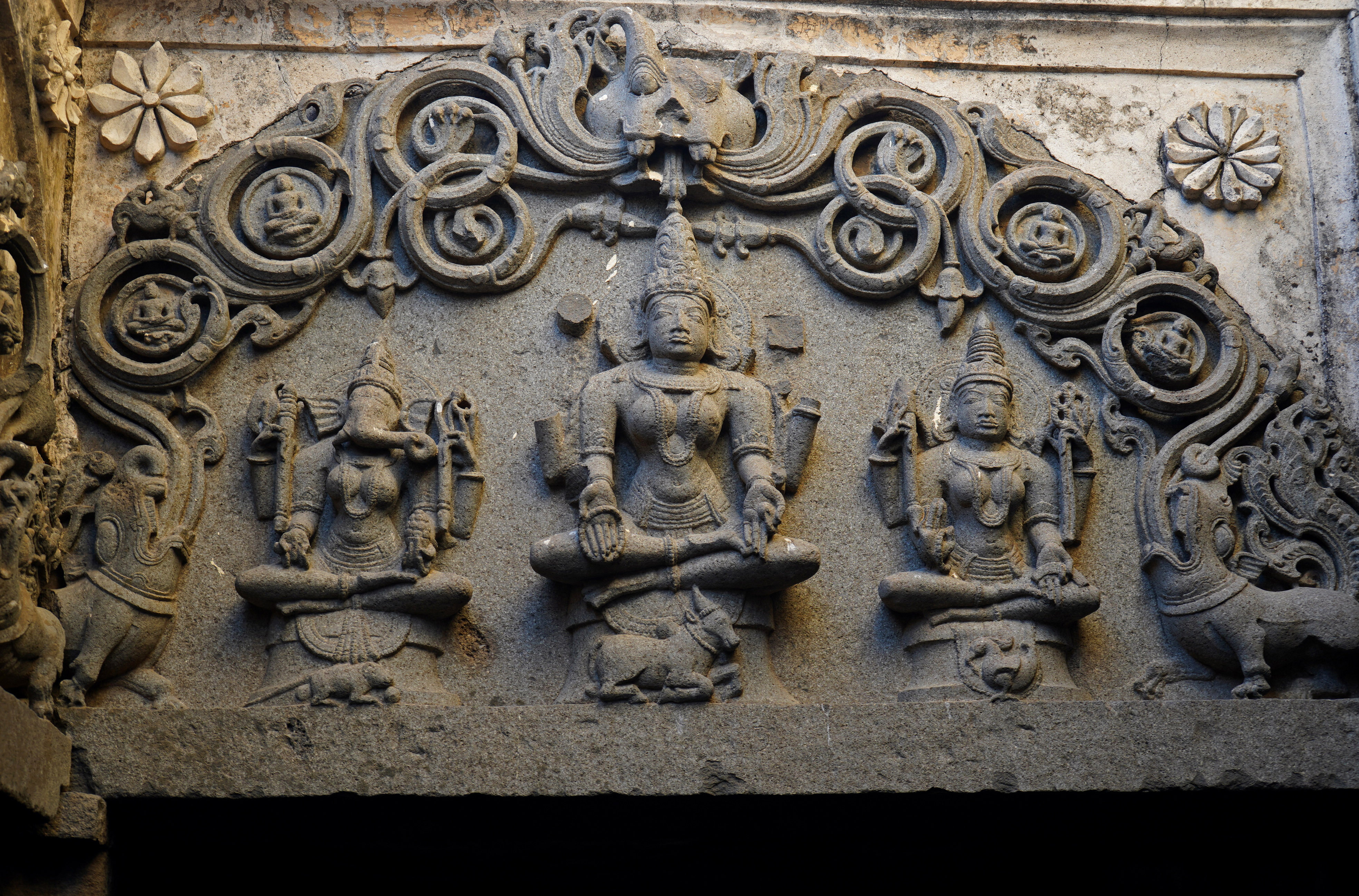

The temple also has an idol of Ganesha in female attire. It is popular as Ganeshwari or Lambodari or Ganeshyani. Along with Ganesha, Shiv and kartikeyan female version available besides Ganesha. This temple is said to have been built in the 1200 century by King Krishnadevaraya.The temple figurines were attacked and disfigured by the Mughals.

== Location and construction ==
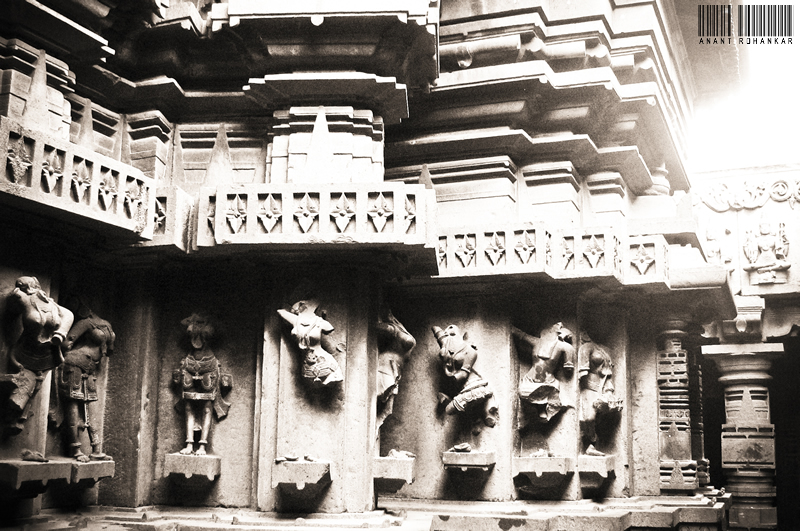
Carvings of the temple

According to the local Hindu beliefs the temple was built by the Pandava. Also, another temple of king Bharata is built at Bhartgaon near Bhuleshwar temple.The temple was restored (Jirnodhar in Marathi language) during the period of 1230 CE during Yadava Rulers. The fort on which the temple is situated is called the Daulatmangal fort, also at times referred to as Mangalgad. Black basalt (AA type) rock was brought to construct this temple which is different as compared to surrounding brownish color basalt which has high percentage of calcium (lime mortar). The fort was constructed in 1629 by Adilshahi general, Murar Jagdev Pandit who, in 1630, destroyed the then town of Pune.He then built the fort to keep a watch on the town. The composition of light here is an interesting phenomenon especially for artists and photographers. It is created by an aisle having ornamental scriptures on the surrounding walls of the Garbhagriha & Antarala on one side & Devkulikas-cells built for various other deities-on the other. There are many tourists who come to see these historical temples.

== Surroundings ==
Many birds migrate here and to Narayanbet, which is fifteen kilometers from here, during summer. The spot is hence visited by many bird-watchers. There are many places to visit around Bhuleshwar Temple. Such as Chintamani Temple of Theur, Ramdara temple and Jejuri Temple.

== Gallery ==
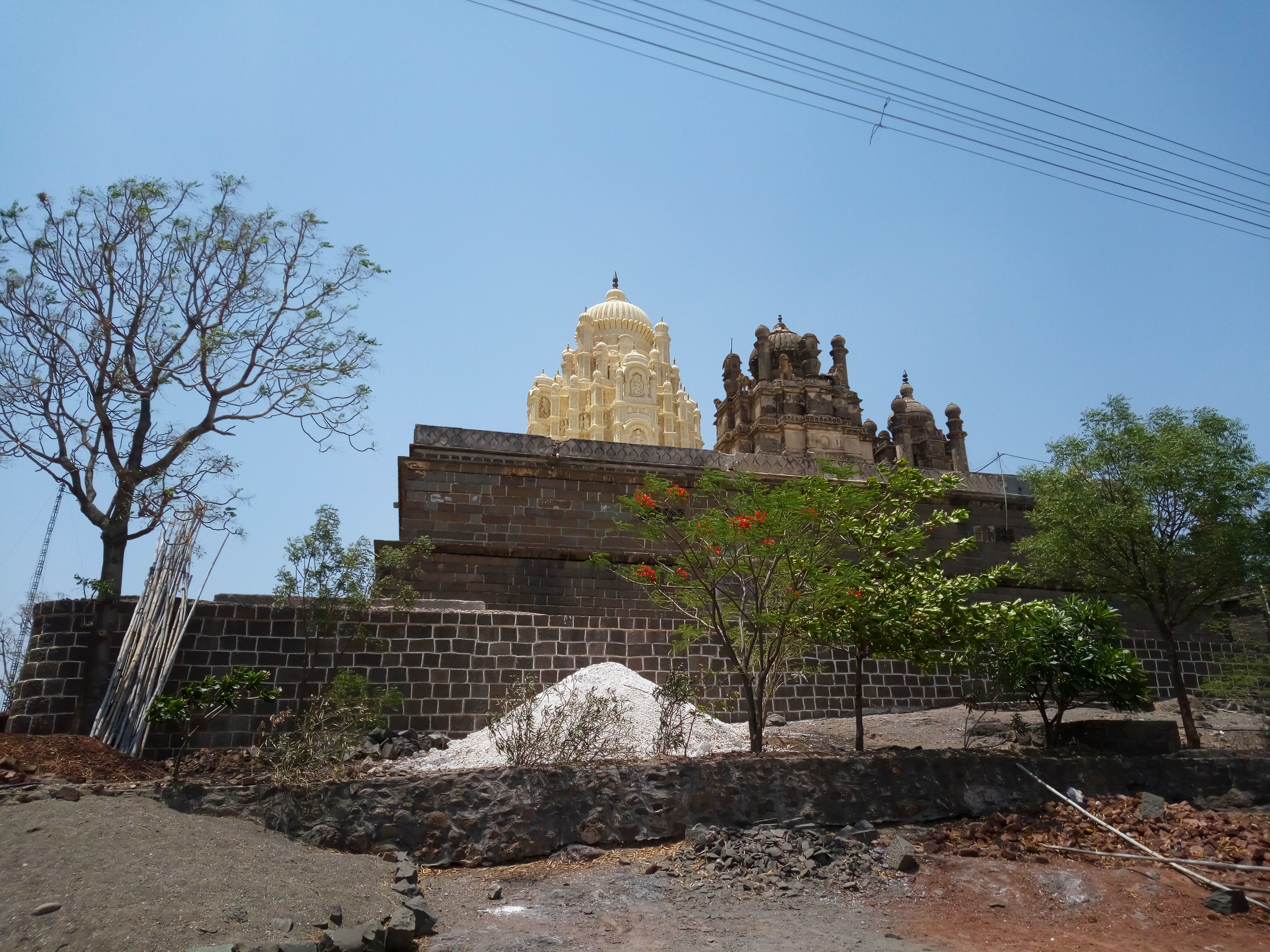
Bhuleshwar Temple: Exterior

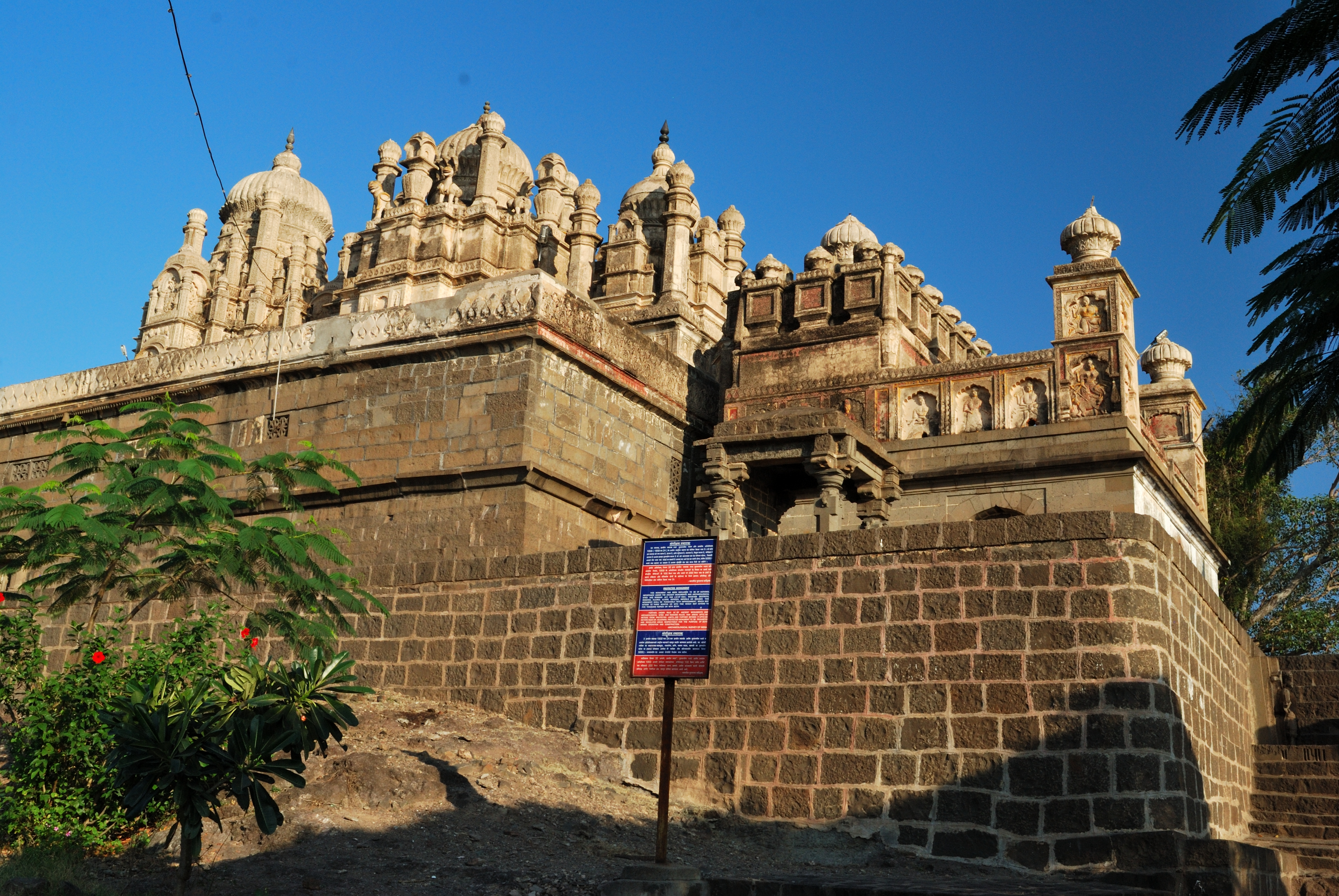
Bhuleshwar Temple: view

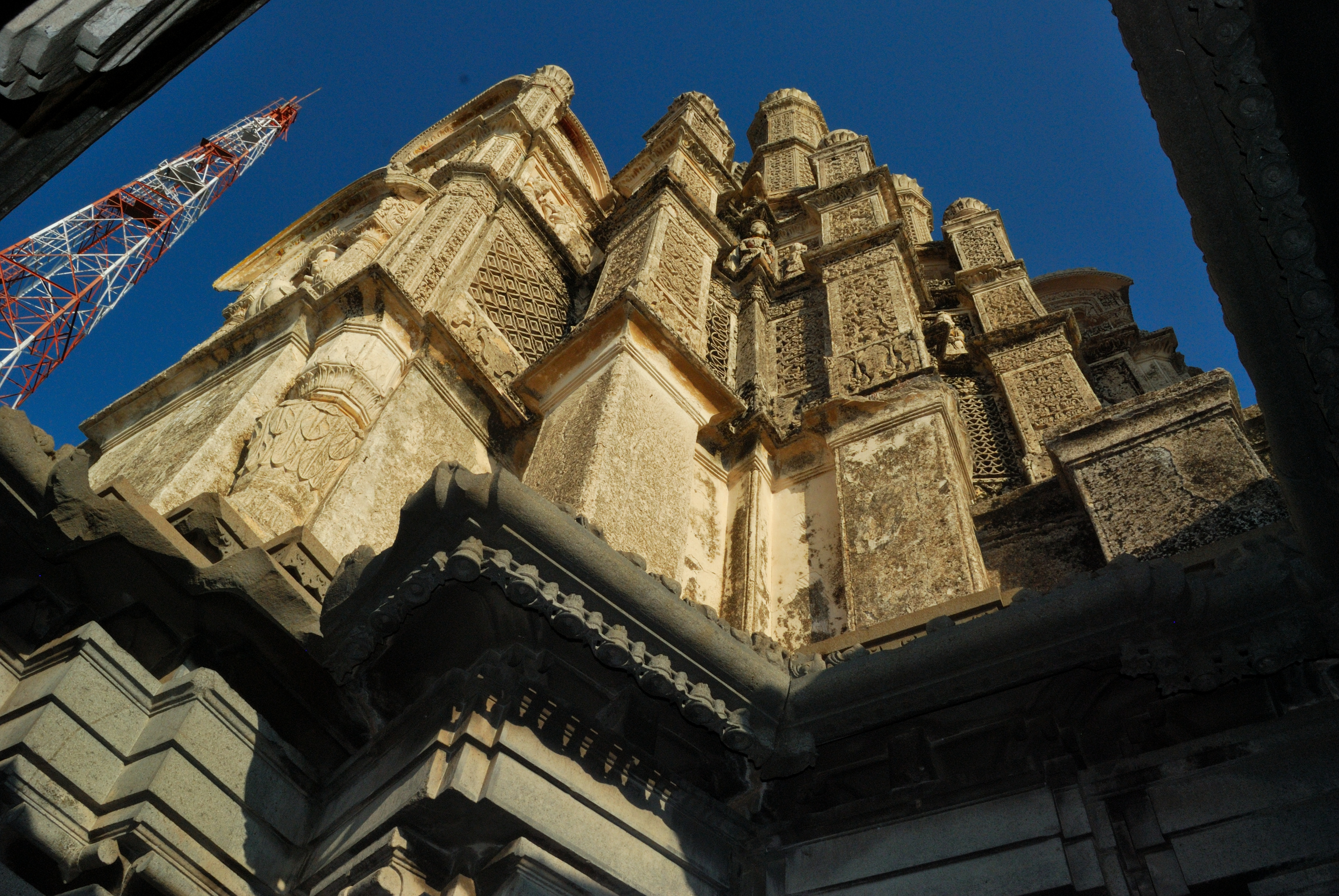
Bhuleshwar Temple: shikhara

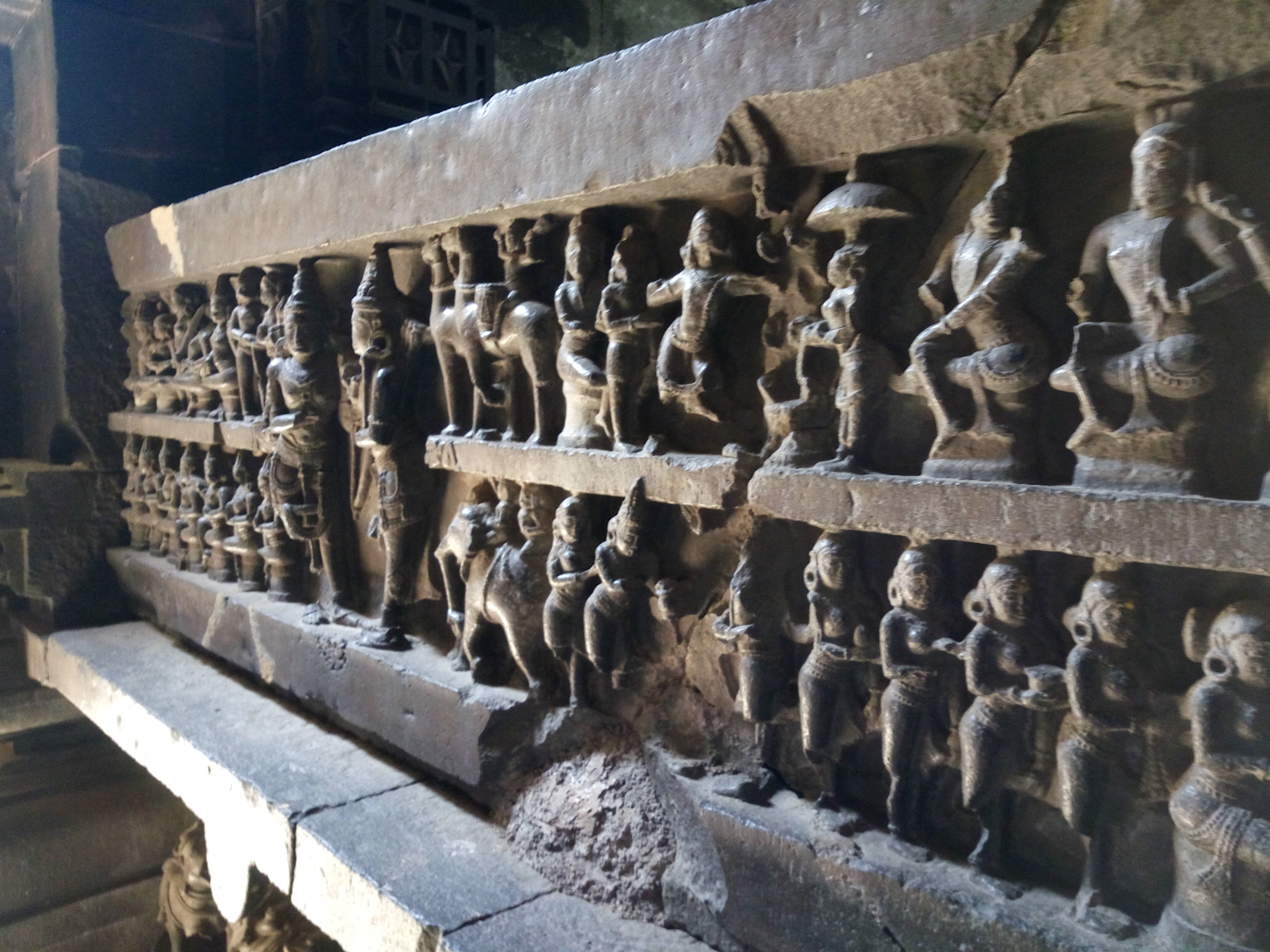
Group of sculptures

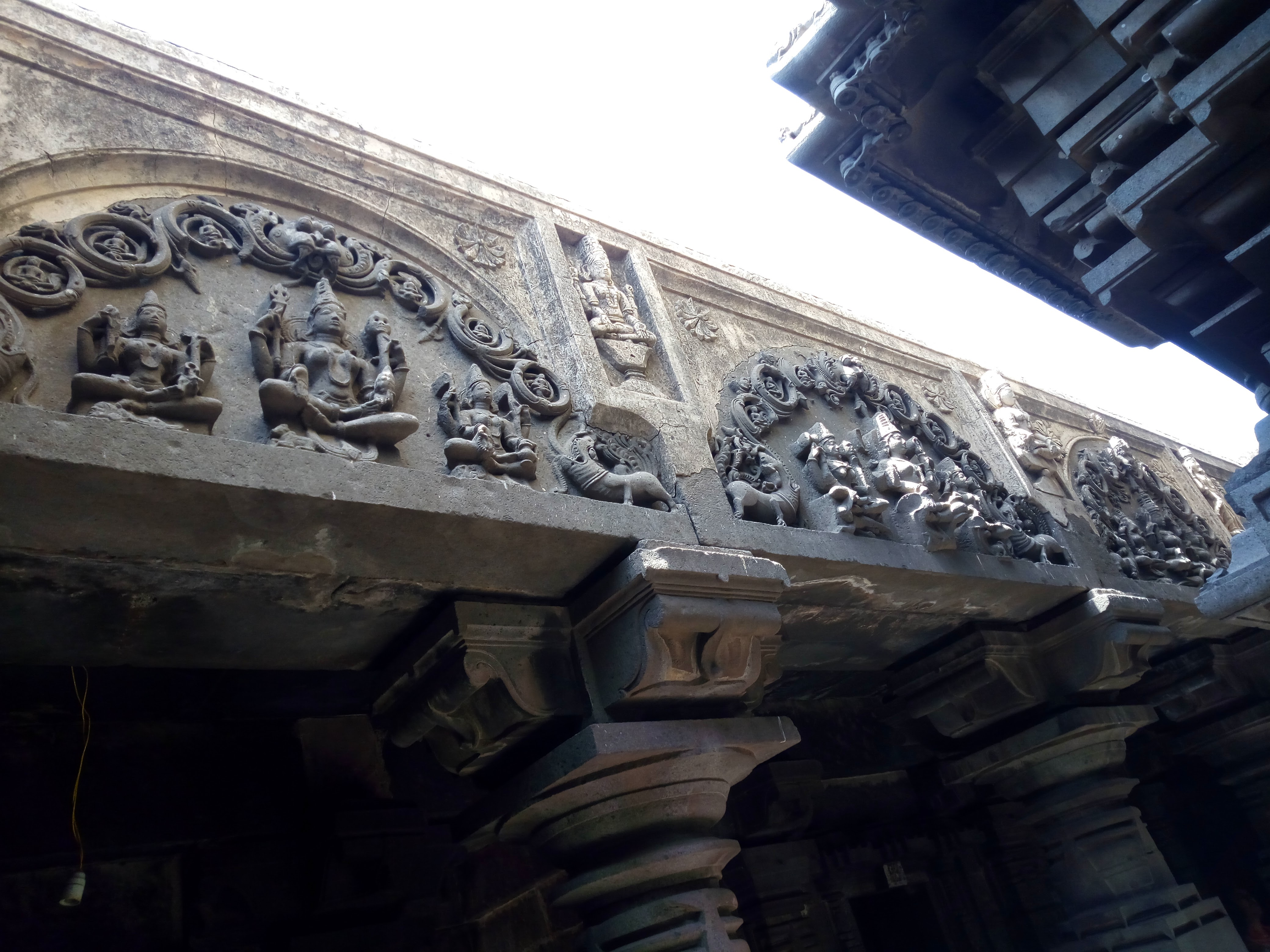
Architecture on upper wall

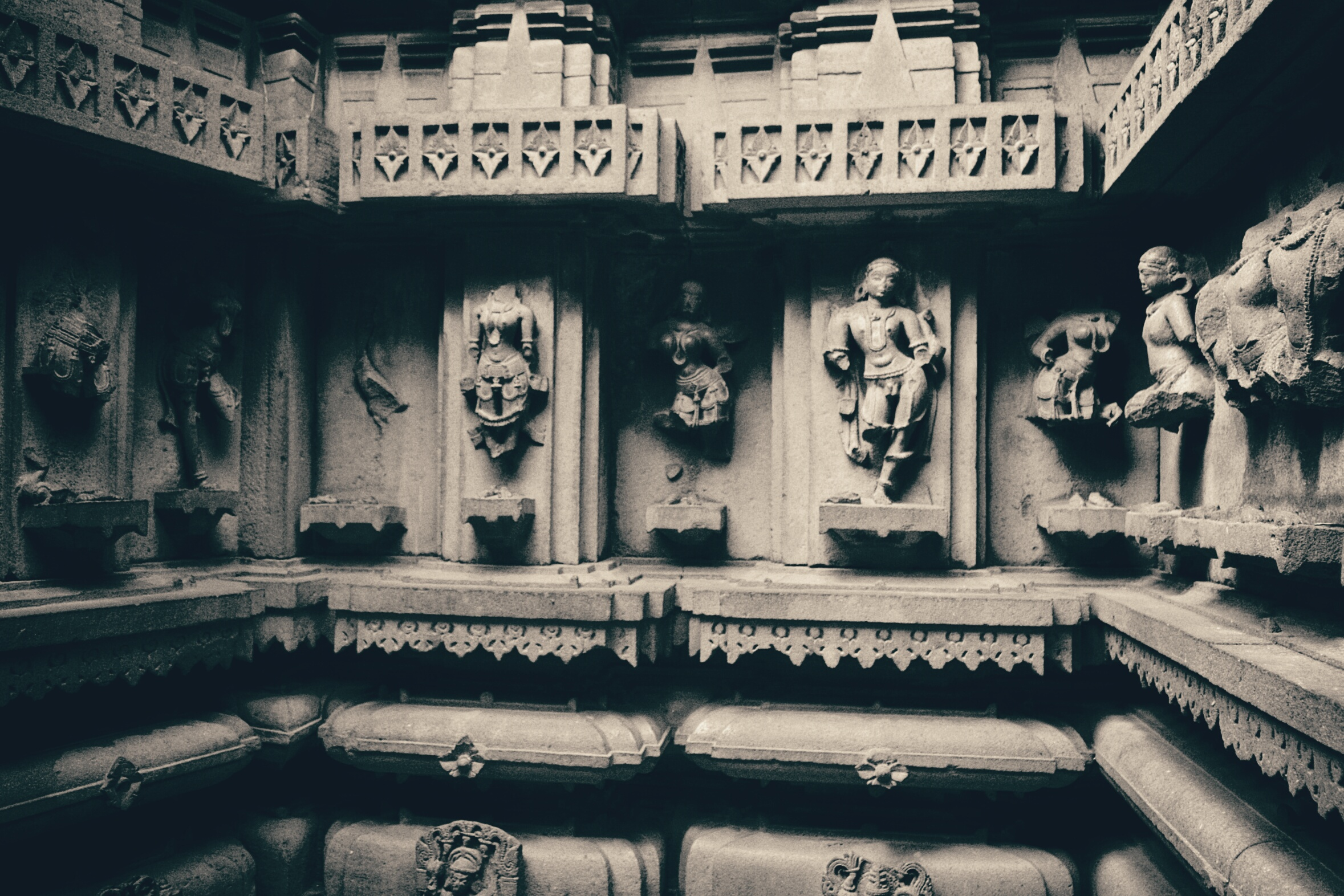
Group oi individual

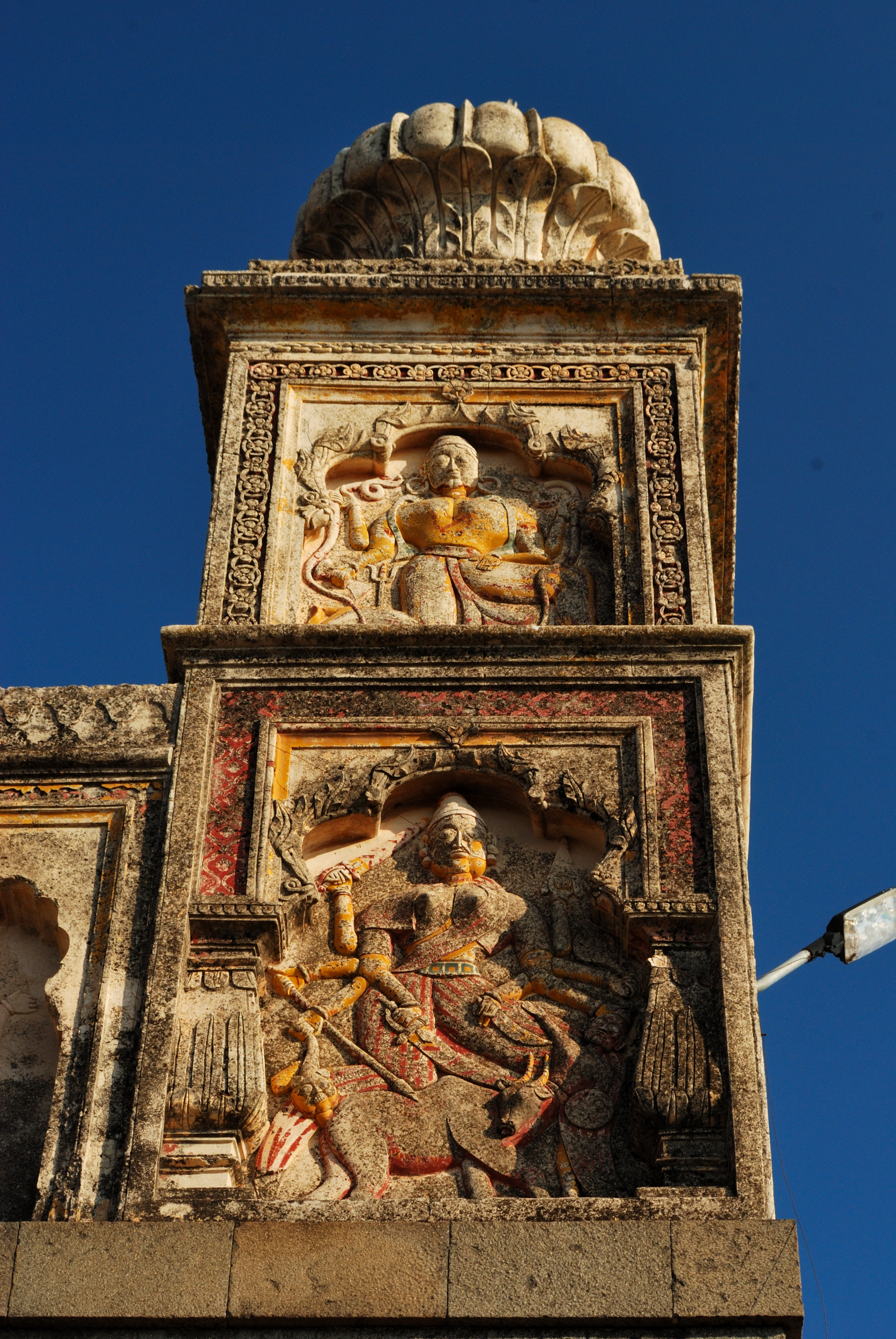
Bhuleshwar Temple: detail

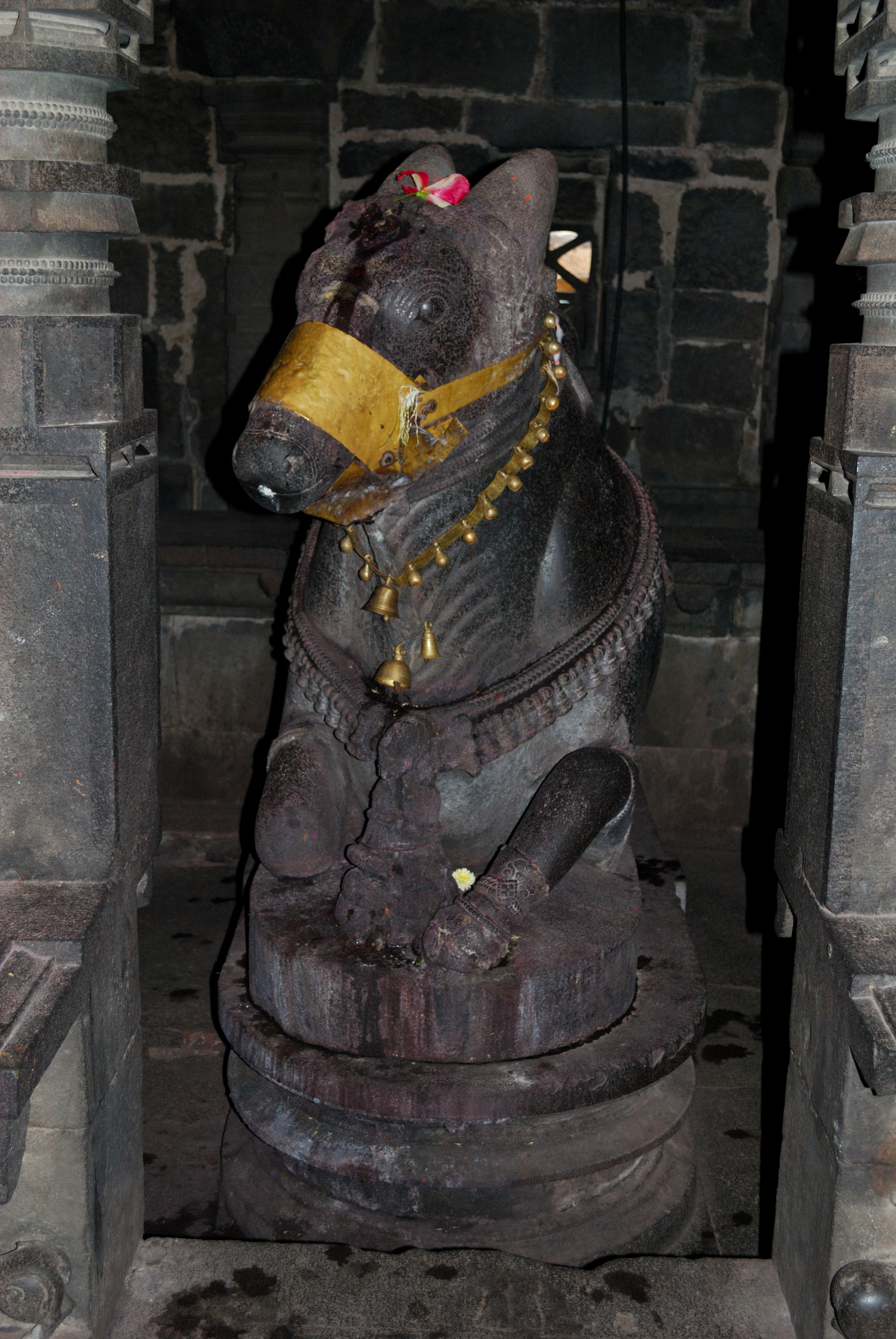
Nandi

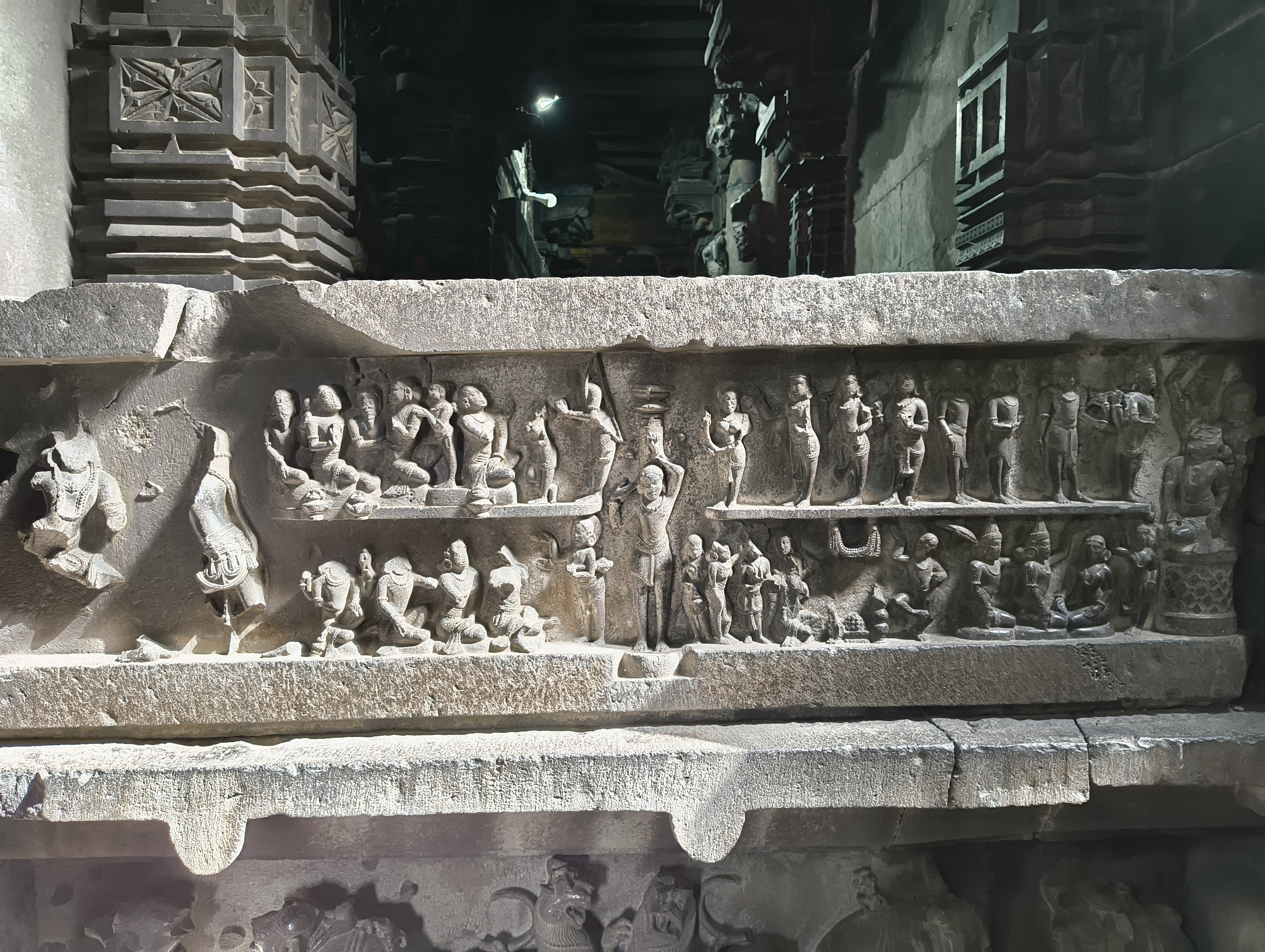
Sculpture depicting the ancient occasion

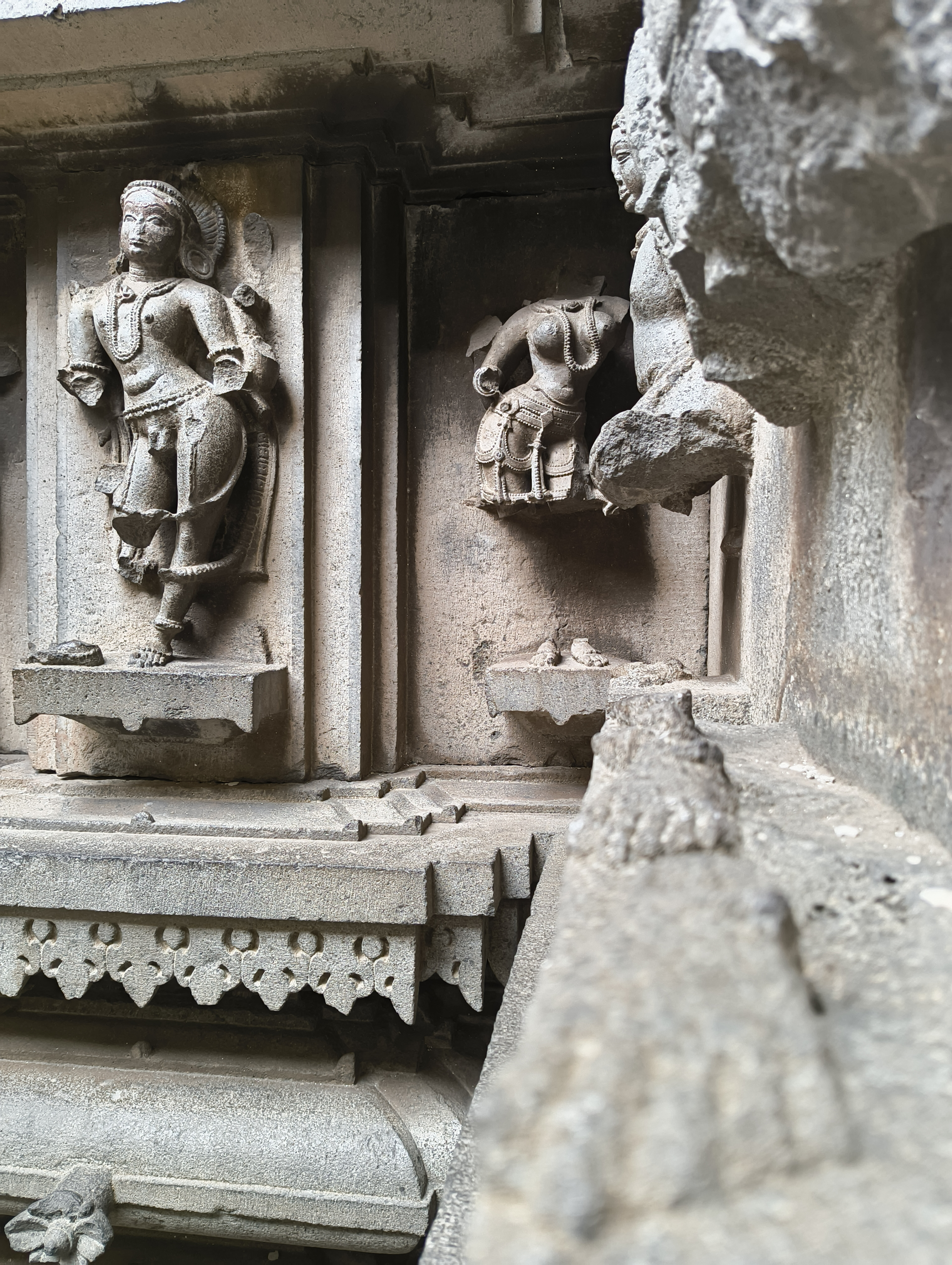
Sculpture of Nartika

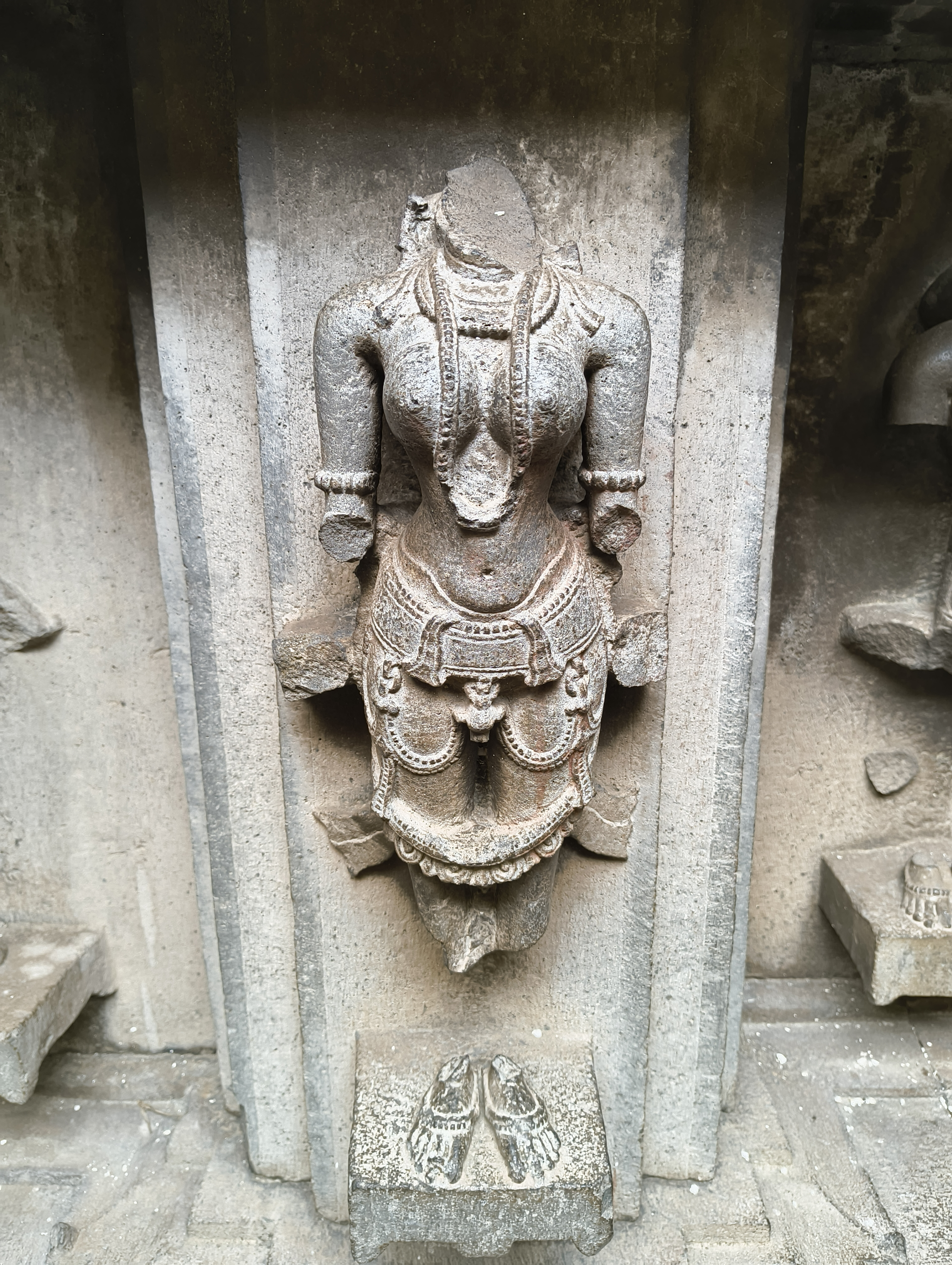
jeweled female sculpture

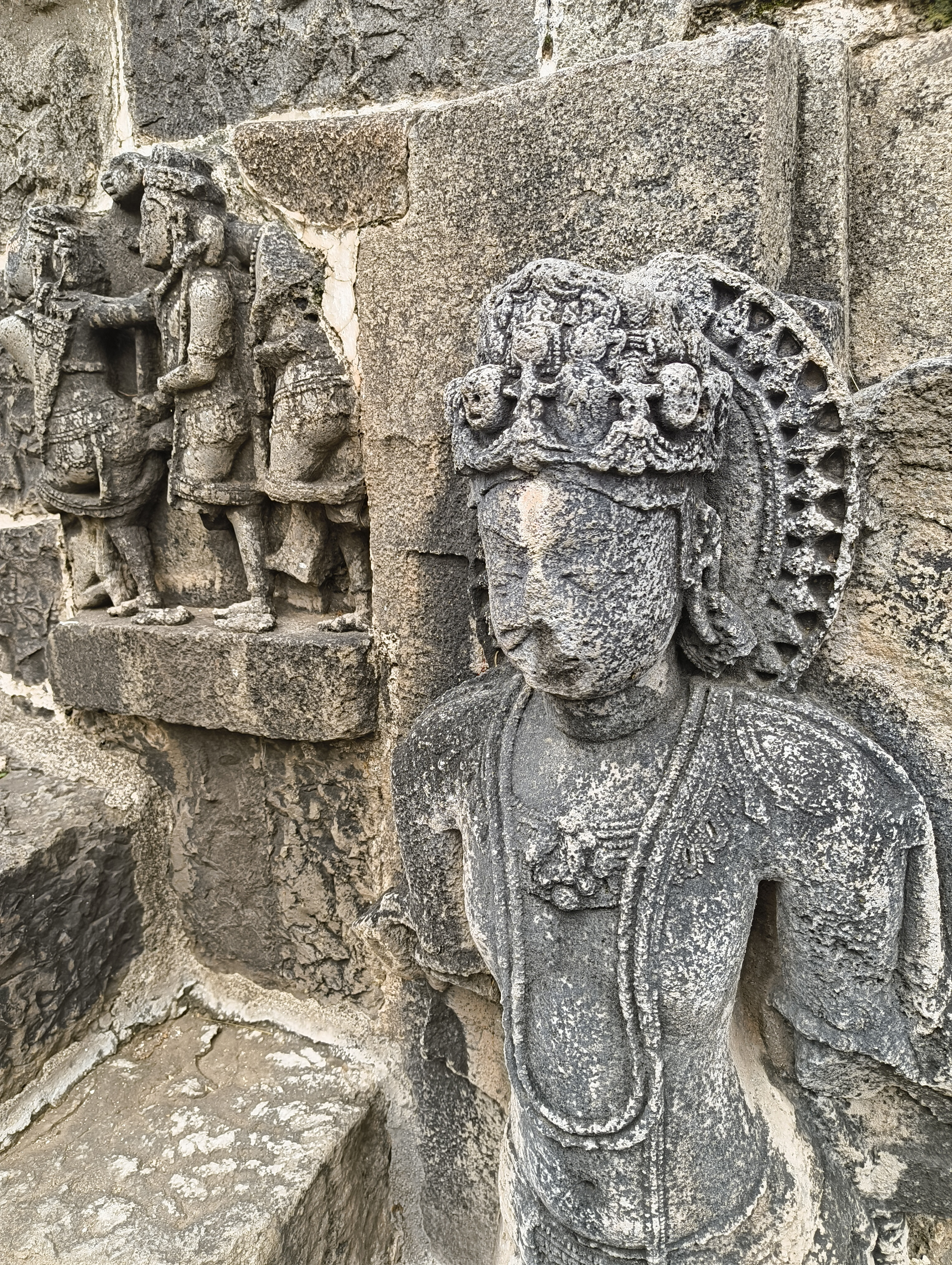
Sculpture at entrance
