= Balakot Tehsil =

Tehsil in Mansehra, Pakistan

Balakot Tehsil تحصیل بالاکوٹ
- Tehsil
- Area of Upper Hazara
- Coordinates: 34.883°N 73.667°E
- Country: Pakistan
- Province: Khyber Pakhtunkhwa
- Region: Hazara
- District: Mansehra

Government
  - MPA: Munir Lughmani Swati (PTI)

Population (2017)
  - Total: 273,089
- Time zone: UTC+5 (PST)
- Number of towns: 1
- Number of Union Councils: 16

Balakot Tehsil (Urdu: تحصیل بالاکوٹ) is an administrative subdivision (tehsil) of Mansehra District in the Khyber Pakhtunkhwa province of Pakistan. Balakot is the main city of the tehsil. It was one of the towns that was devastated in the 2005 Kashmir earthquake with around 80% of the buildings there destroyed. Villages were badly affected and landslides cut off thousands of people from Balakot where relief workers had been helping the survivors.

Its population as of 2017 was 273,000, the main language of the tehsil is Hindko.

== Administration ==
Balakot Tehsil consists of 12 Union Councils:

- Attershisha
- Balakot
- Garhi Habibullah Khan
- Garlat
- Ghanool
- Hangrai
- Kaghan
- Karnol
- Kiwai
- Mahandri
- Satbani
- Shohal Mazullah
- Talhataa

== Notables ==
- Khan Wasil Khan Swati (Khan of Balakot during Sikh rule who helped and gave refuge to Syed Ahmed Shaheed in his Haveli)
- Jageerdar Lal Khan Swati (Khan of Balakot during British Rule)
- Haji Rustam Khan Swati (Ex-Tehsil Nazim Balakot)
- Shams Khan Lughmani Swati (Chairman DRC Tehsil Balakot)
- Mazullah Khan Lughmani Swati (Founder and Khan of Shohal Mazullah Khan
- Najaf Khan Dodal Swati (Founder of Shohal Najaf Khan and Khan of Mahandri)
- Syed Qasim Shah (MNA)
- Syed Ahmed Hussain Shah(MPA)
- Haji Saleem Khan Dhodyari Swati (Current Chief of Balakot city)
- Haider Khan Bejori Swati (Current Chairman Balakot city)
- Mian Wali Ur Rehman (MPA)
- Munir Lughmani Swati (MPA, Advocate Supreme Court)
- Babar Naseem Khankhel Swati (Ex-Food Minister KPK)
- Mian Zia Ur Rehman (MPA)
- Wajid Hamayun Khan Swati(Politician)
- Muhammad Fareed Khan Khawajakheli (Chairman) Jagerdar of Balakot
