= Kanshian =

Kanshian کانشیاں
- Village
- Location in Pakistan
- Coordinates: 34°32′N 73°24′E
- Country: Pakistan
- Region: Khyber-Pakhtunkhwa
- District: Mansehra District
- Tehsil: Balakot بالاکوٹ
- Union Council: Garlat گرلاٹ
- Elevation: 1,952 m (6,404 ft)
- Time zone: UTC+5 (PST)
- Postal code: 21231
- Area code: 0997

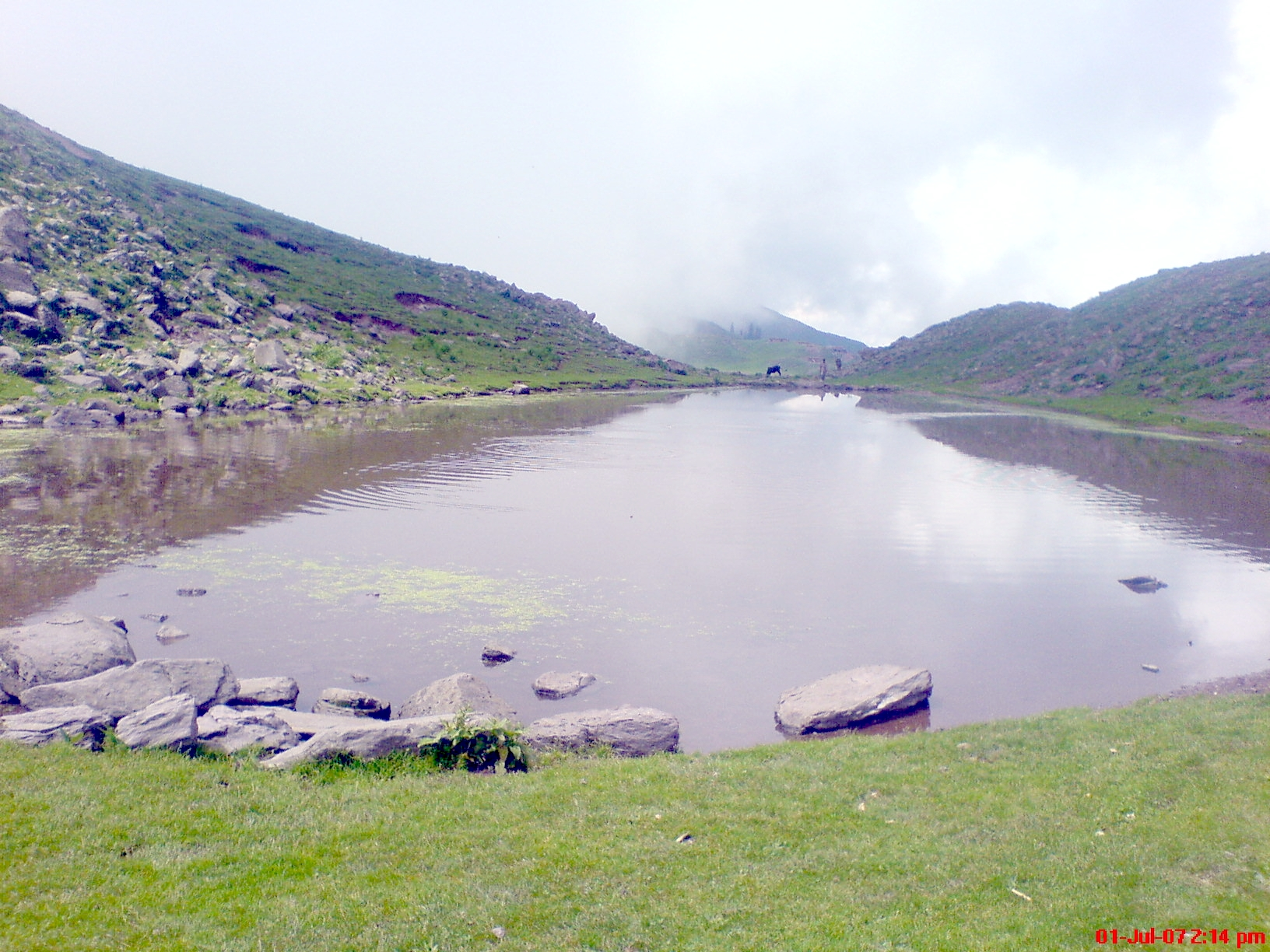
Sar, a lake on the mountain ridgeline to the east of Kanshian Village

Kanshian (Hindko: کانشیاں) is a village located in Mansehra District, Khyber-Pakhtunkhwa province of Pakistan. It is a village of Union Council Garlat of tehsil Balakot to the south east of the Balakot city. It lies in the series of mountains connecting the Neelum Valley in Pakistani-held Kashmir to the Kaghan Valley.

== Etymology ==
According to oral traditions, the word Kanshian is after the name of a person "Kansha Ram". He is said to have been the Hindu merchant who lived here in about British Period. However, there is no strong evidence for this assumption. But there are references to the existence of such a Hindu community in the region during the Sikh and British Period. This community established Hattis ہٹـی (Small shop) in the area.

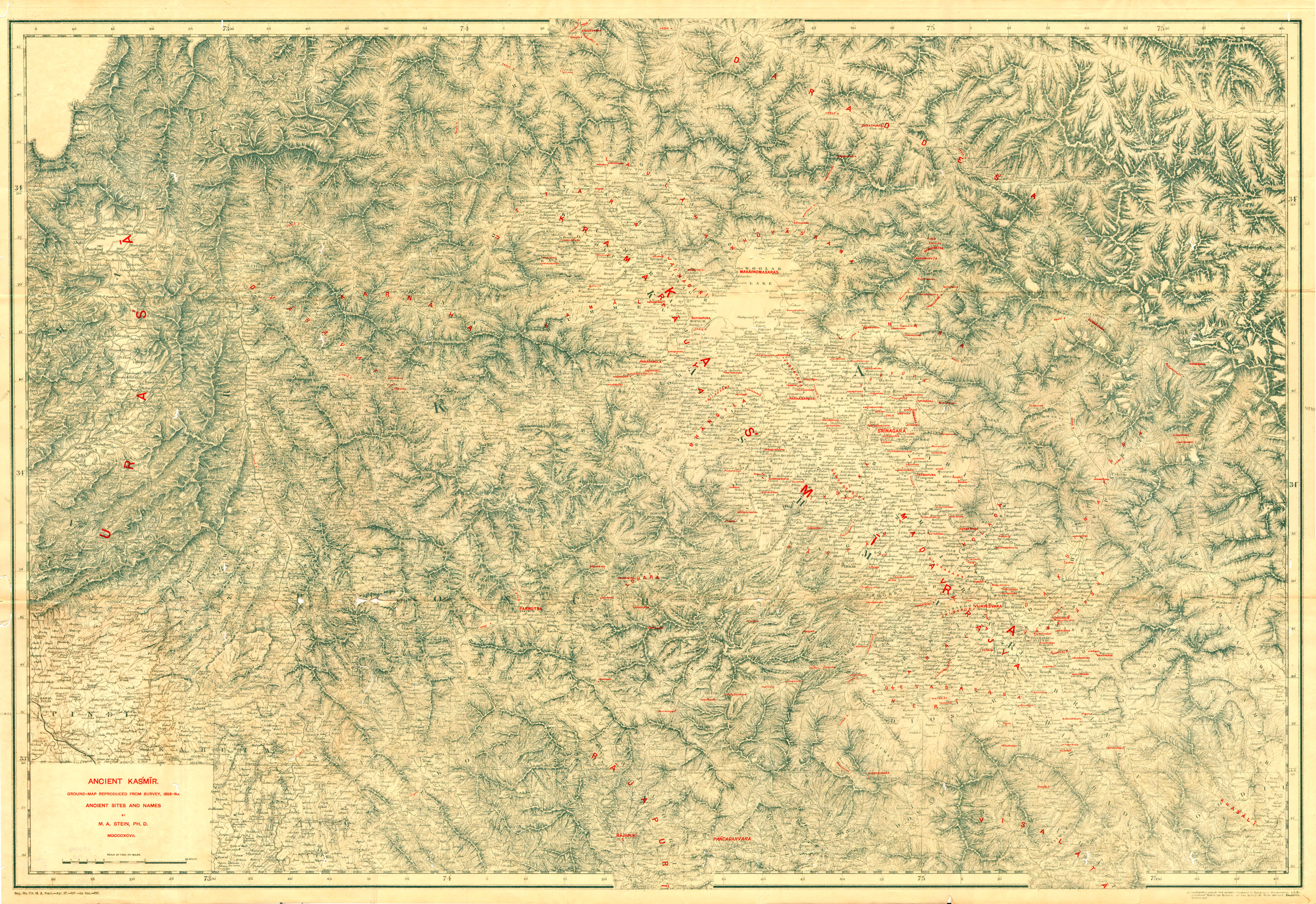
Name 'Kashi' can be seen while zooming in this map of Kashmir, in Kalhana's Rajatarangini, A Chronicle of the Kings of Kashmir by Marc Aural Stein

The 1900s British Army maps mention its name as 'Kashi'

== Administration ==
The village of Kanshian is administratively Union Council: Garlat گرلاٹ.
