= Makra Peak =

Mountain in the Himalayas

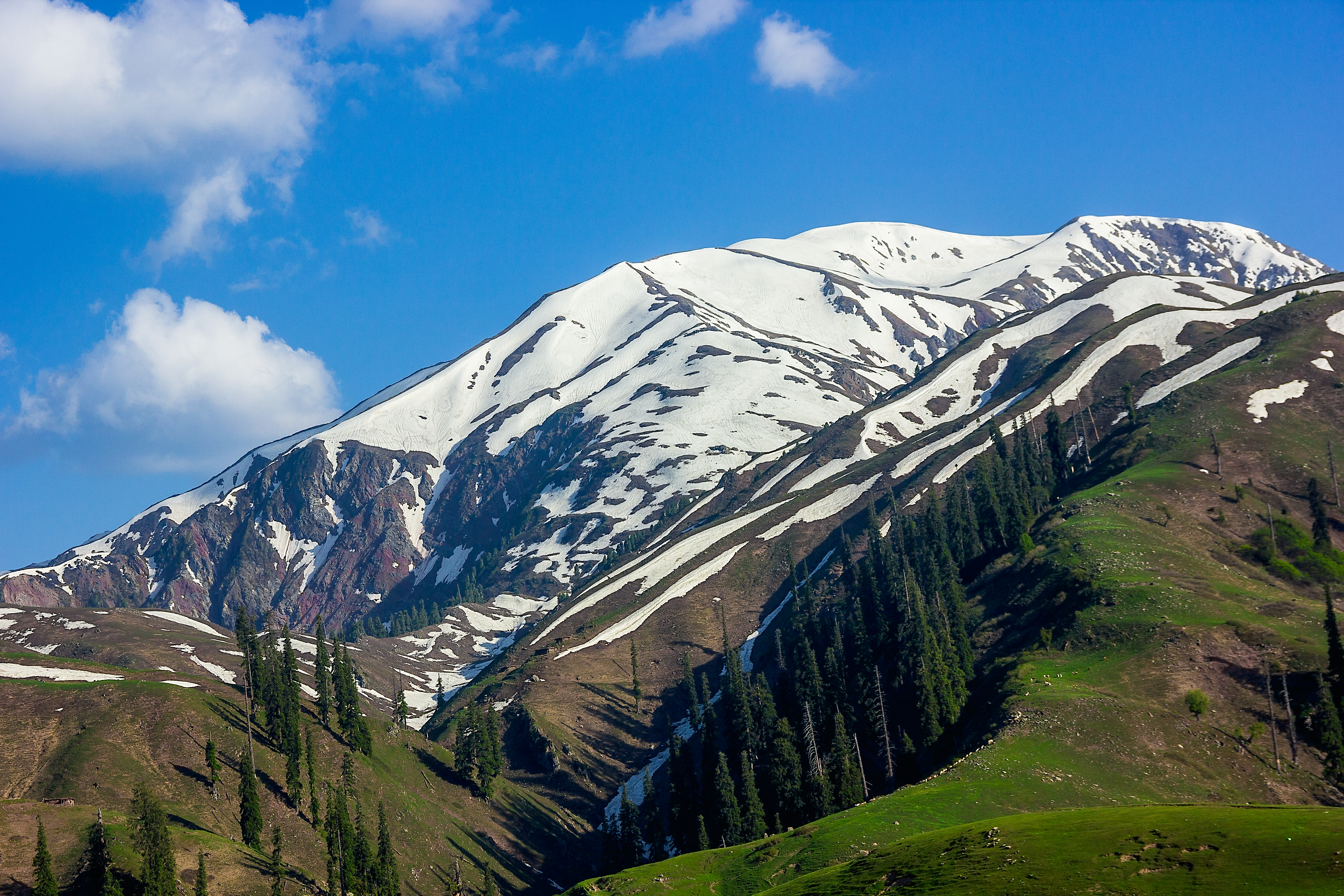
- Makra Peak, Shogran

Highest point
- Elevation: 3,885 m (12,746 ft)
- Prominence: 709 m (2,326 ft)
- Listing: List of mountains in Pakistan
- Coordinates: 34°34′26″N 73°29′43″E

Geography
- Location within Pakistan
- Location: Khyber Pakhtunkhwa–Azad Kashmir boundary, Pakistan
- Parent range: Himalayas

Climbing
- Easiest route: Hike

The Makra Peak (Urdu: مکڑا چوٹی; lit. 'Spider Peak') is a mountain peak in the Himalayas Range, located on the border between the Kaghan Valley of Khyber Pakhtunkhwa and the Pakistani-administered Azad Kashmir. It is 3,885 metres (12,746 ft) high and almost 200 kilometres (120 mi) from Islamabad on the Naran Road. The trek to the peak starts from the Kaghan Valley, located in Hazara region of the northern Pakistan. From Kiwai, a single 7-kilometre-long road runs uphill to Shogran, a tourist resort with numerous hotels; the track continues to climb up to Siri Lake and ends at Payee. From here it is a trek of four hours to the top of the Makra.

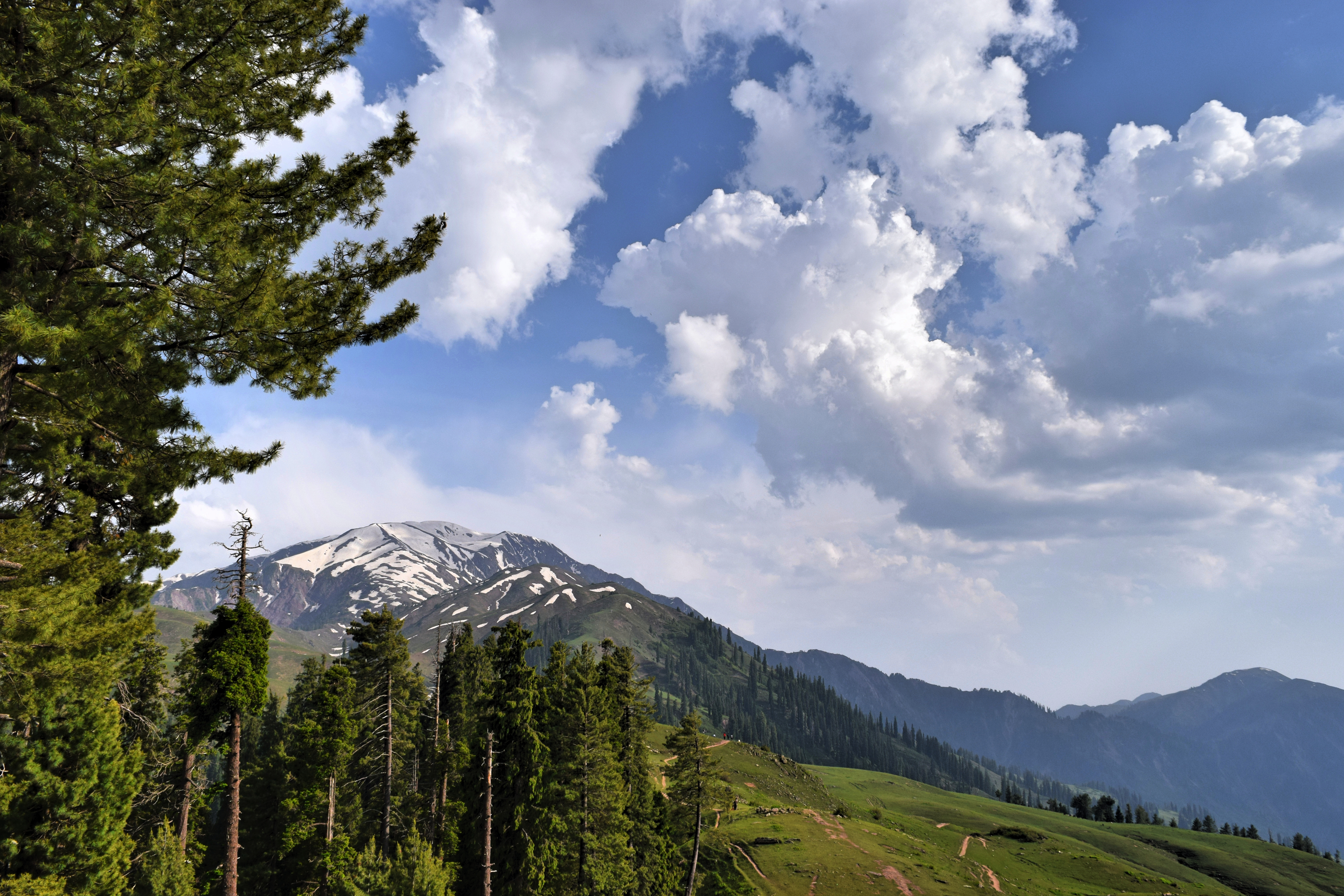
Makra peak, Shogran, Kaghan Valley

Although it can be straightforward to climb, fatalities have occurred during storms. In spite of its difficulties, the summit offers views of Hazara and Azad Kashmir. Fatalities tend to occur in bad weather, especially thick fog, and as a result of the steepness of some sections. The waters from the mountain's glacier feed the Kunhar River.

== Gallery ==
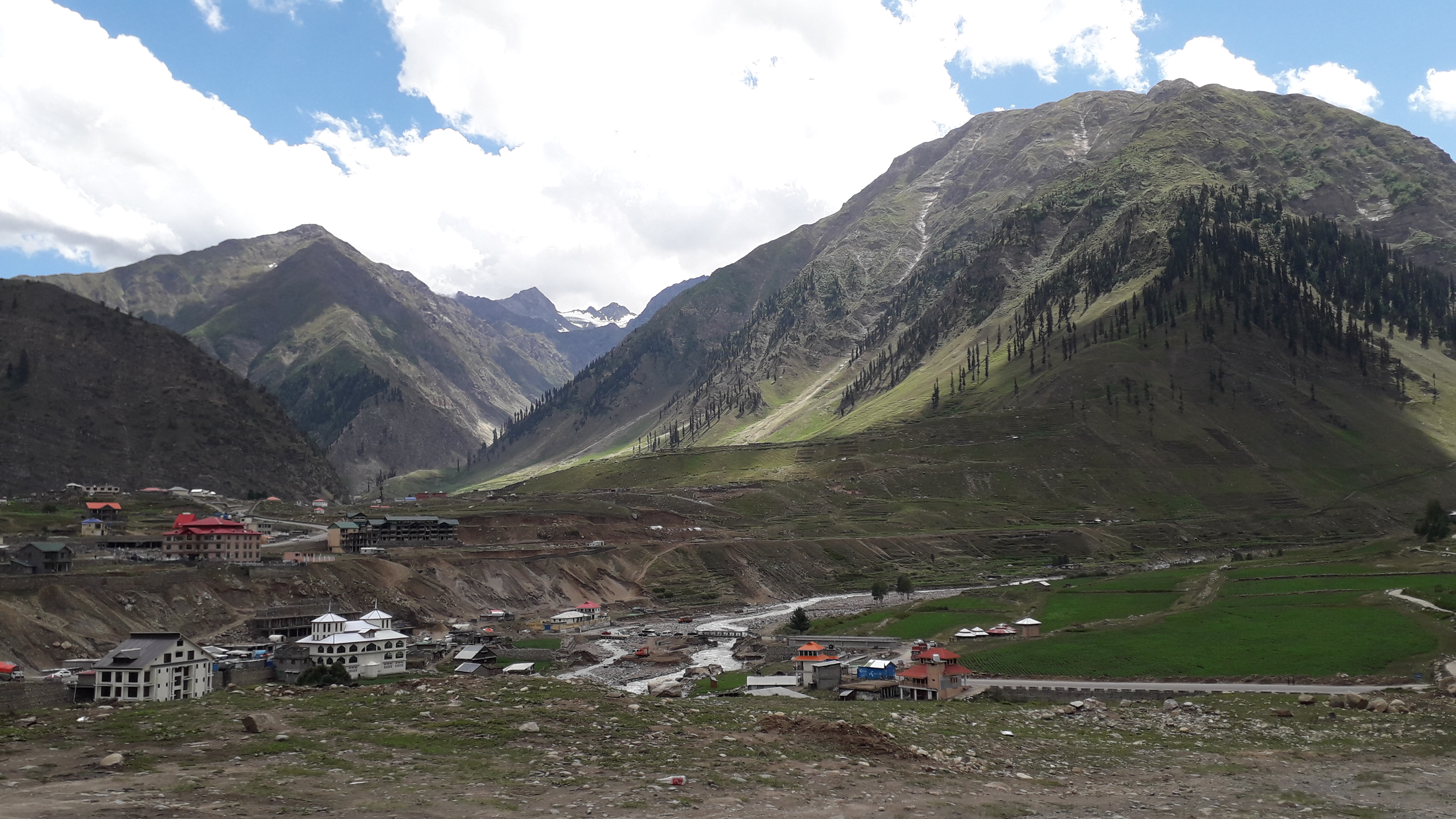
Makra Peak

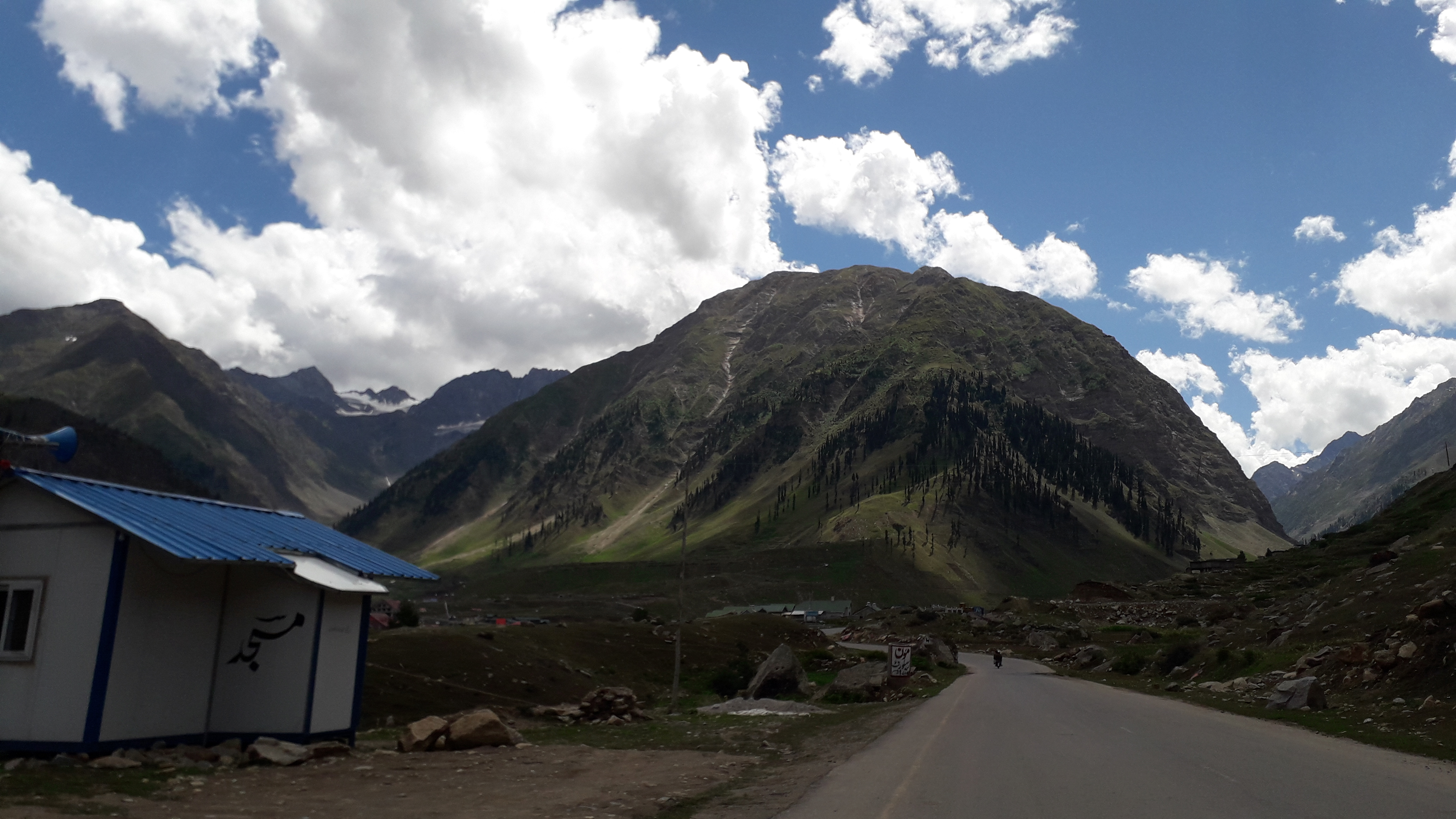
Makra Peak

== See also ==
- Malika Parbat
- Kaghan Valley
