= Karnol =

Karnol کرنول UC/VC Karnol
- Village and union council
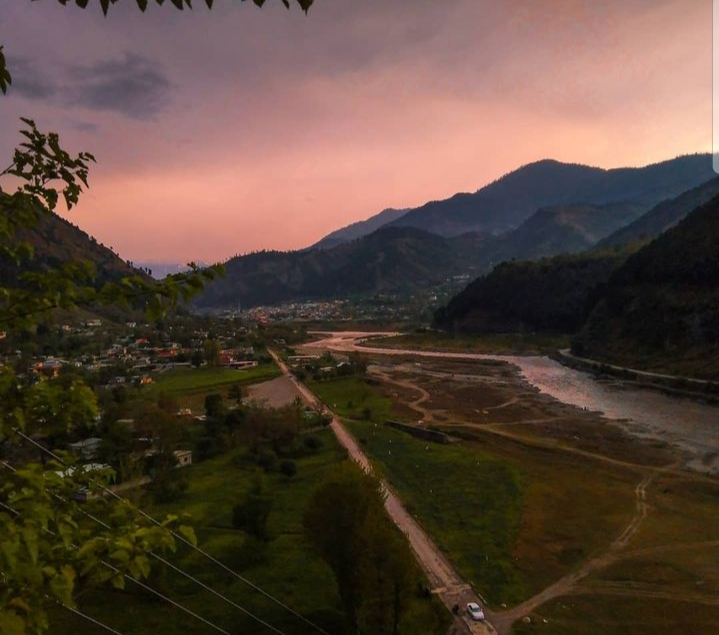
- View of Karnol from Banglaw Hills

- Location in Pakistan
- Coordinates: 34°23′N 73°23′E
- Country: Pakistan
- Province: Khyber-Pakhtunkhwa
- District: Mansehra District
- Region: Upper Pakhli
- Preceded By: Chief of Swatis
- Succeeded By: West Pakistan
- Founded by: Khankhail Swati Family

Government
  - Nazim ناظم: Shoukat Nawaz Khankhail
  - Chairmain چیئرمین: Sajid Ali Khankhail
- Time zone: UTC+5 (PST)

Karnol is a village and union council of Mansehra District in the Khyber-Pakhtunkhwa province of Pakistan. It is located at an altitude of 797 meters (2618 feet), lying southeast to Abbottabad and the Kashmir frontier. It was affected by the 2005 Kashmir earthquake.

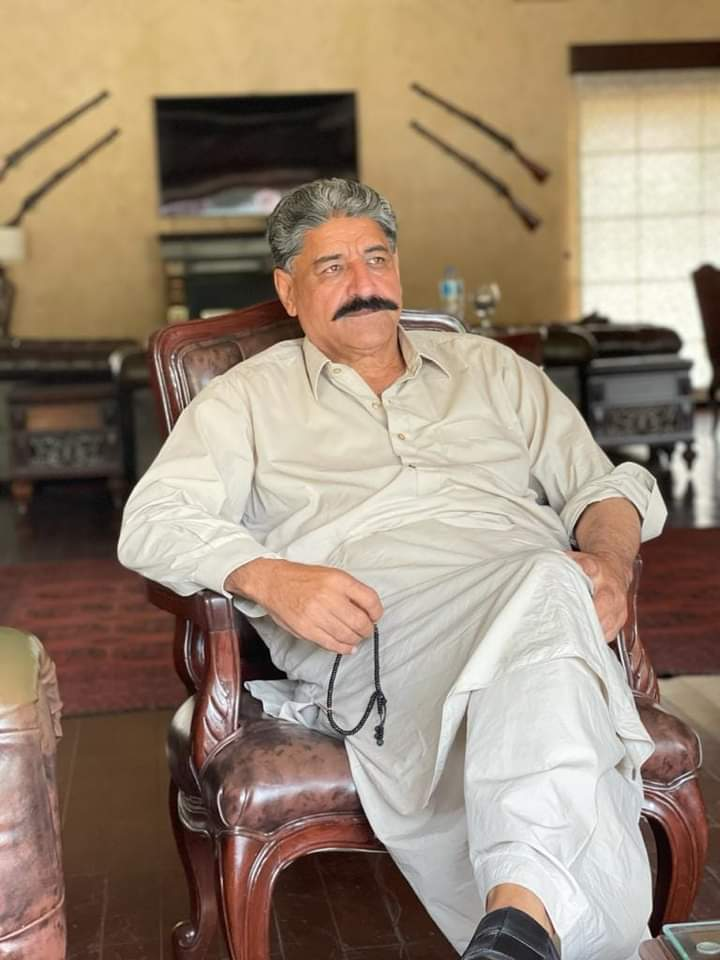
Khan of Karnol Sajid Ali Khankhail (Chairman Village Council Karnol)

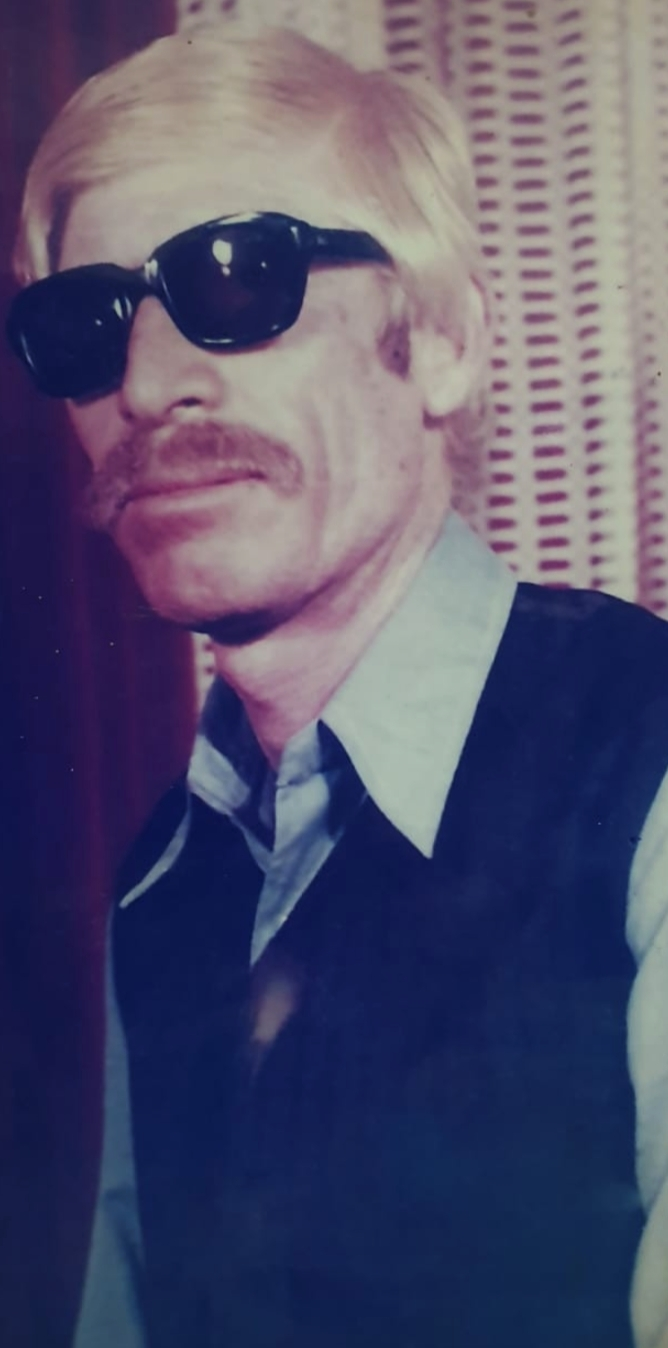
Anwar-ur-Rasheed Khankhail (Khan of Karnol) First elected President of the District Union of Journalists (DUJ) Mansehra.

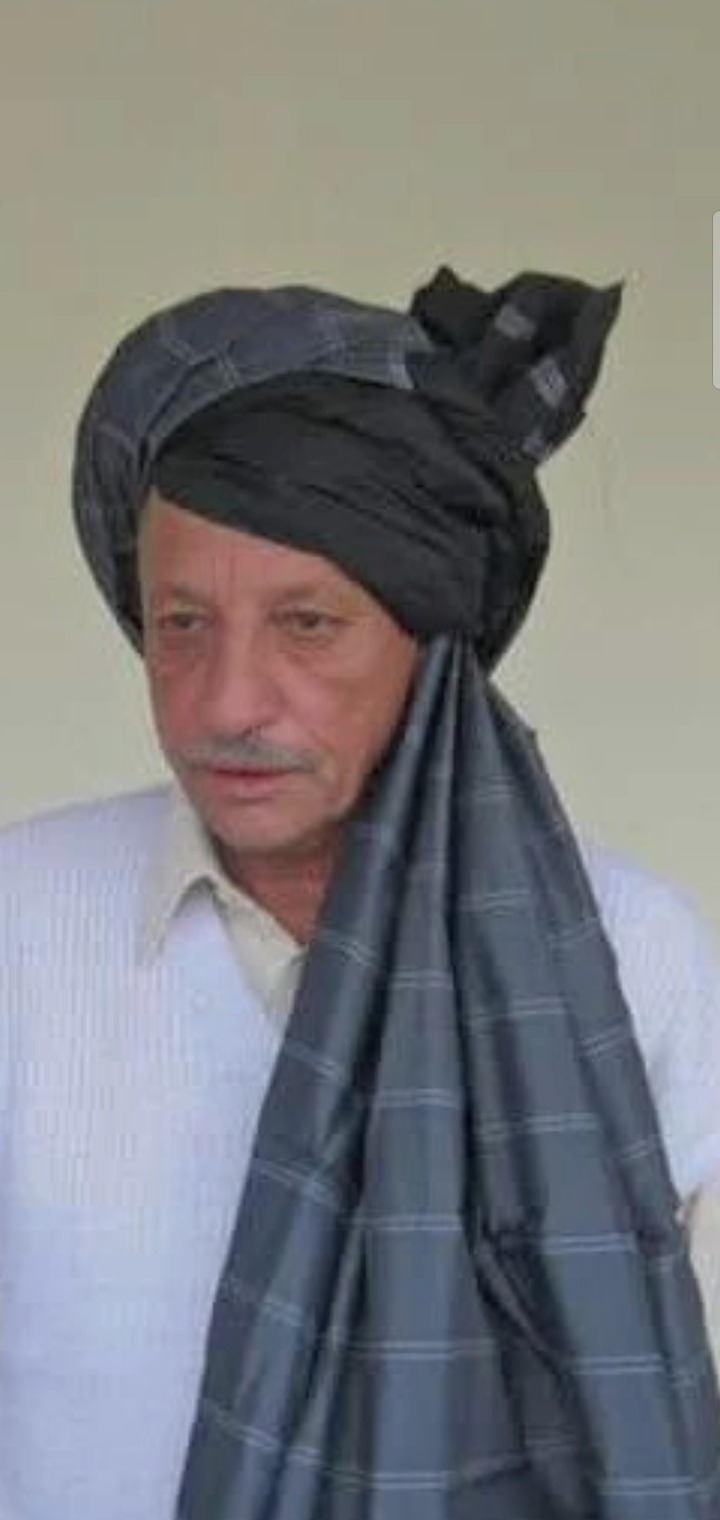
Liaquat Ali Khankhail ( Khan of Karnol) Chairmain VC Karnol, Ex Member District Council Mansehra

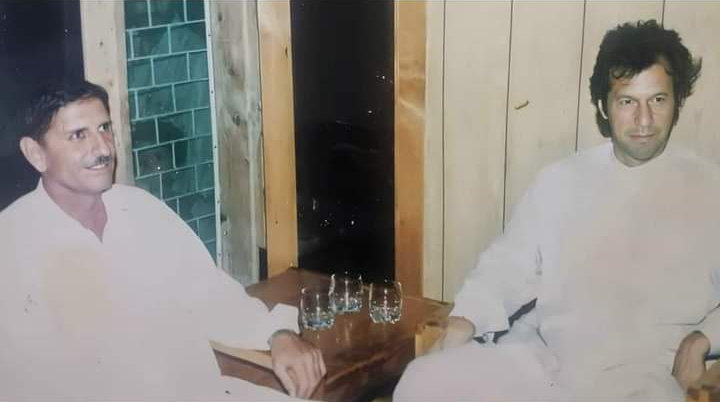
Shoukat Nawaz Khankhail(Nazim UC Karnol) with Former Prime Minister of Pakistan Imran Khan at his Dehdi

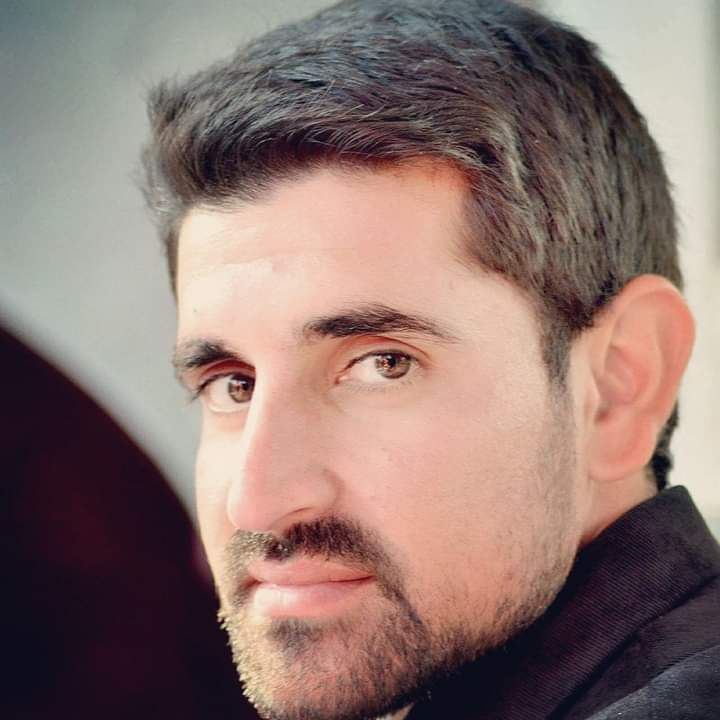
Ahmed Rasheed Khankhail (Current Numberdar Revenue state Karnol & Baralkot)

== Land Revenue ==
The village Karnol was founded by Khan Ameer-Ullah Khankhail. All village revenue from Karnol and Baralkot was given to the Khankhail family, as the sole owners. After 1965, when Qayyyum Khan became Minister, some of the land was transferred to individuals in Karnol and Brarkot. The Khans of Karnol have freely given land to the Pakistani government for offices like Nadra Office, PatwarKhana, and educational institutions. The Khankhail family remains the leading tribe of Karnol.

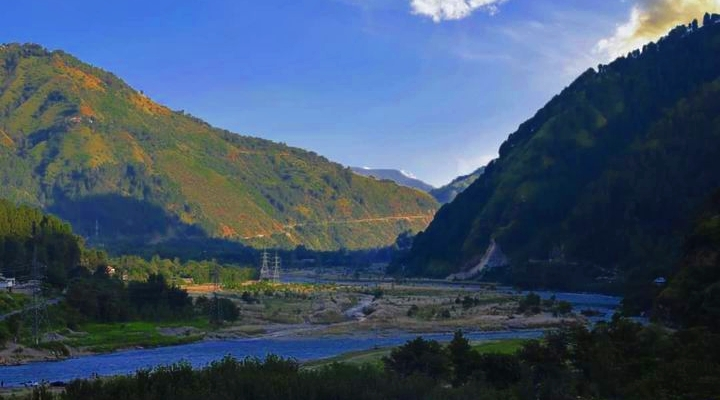
Karnol Image Gallery

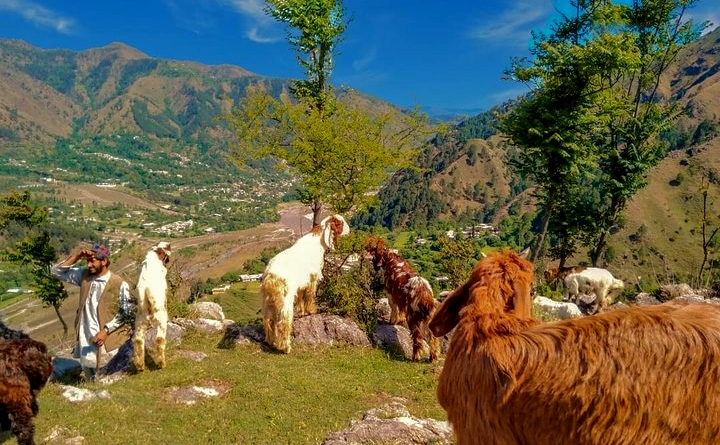
Karnol Image Gallery

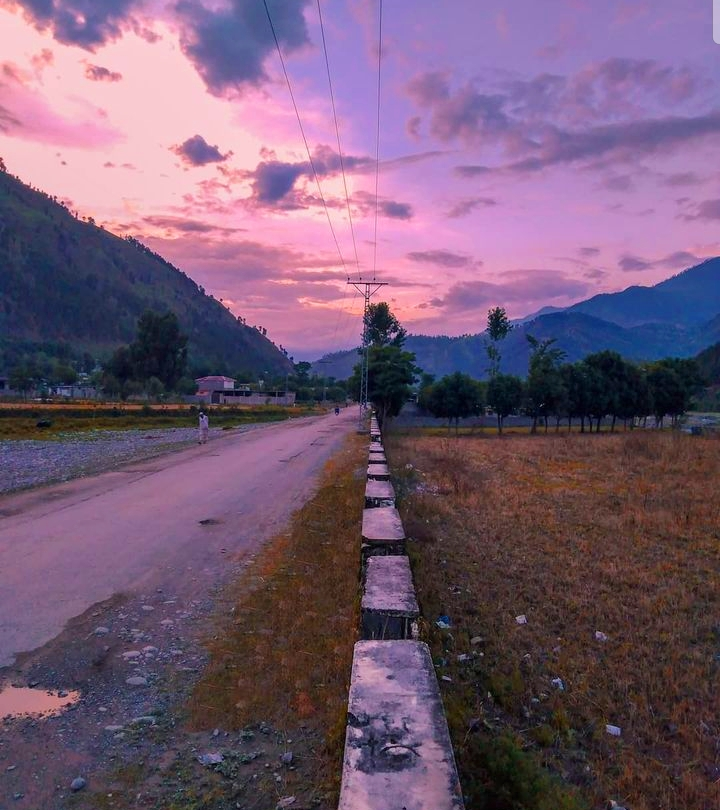
Karnol Image Gallery

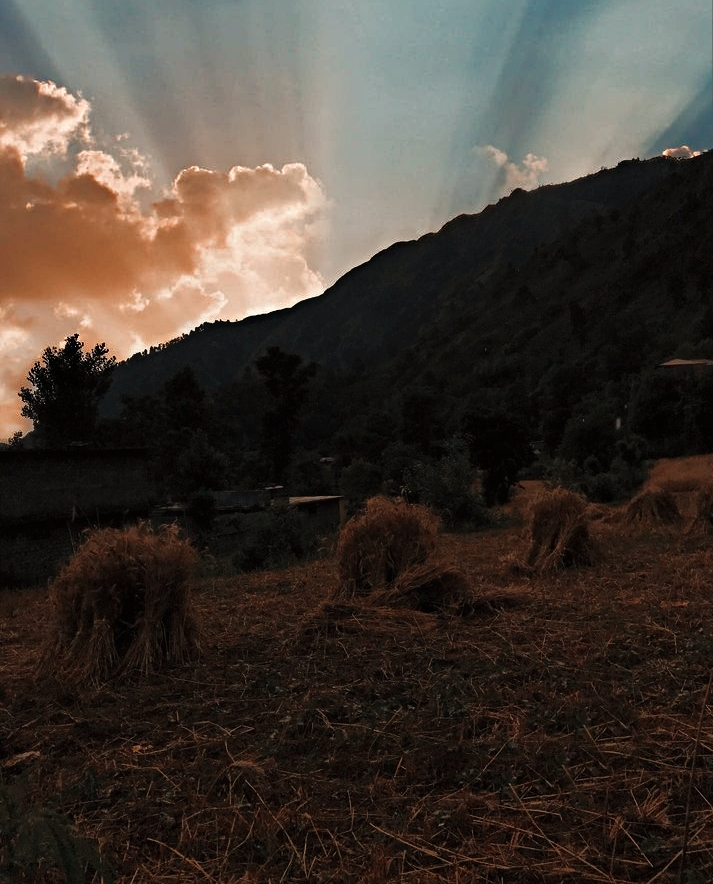
Karnol Image Gallery

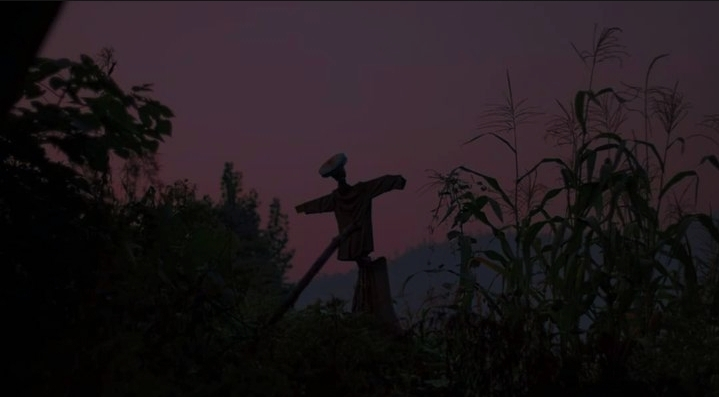
Karnol Image Gallery

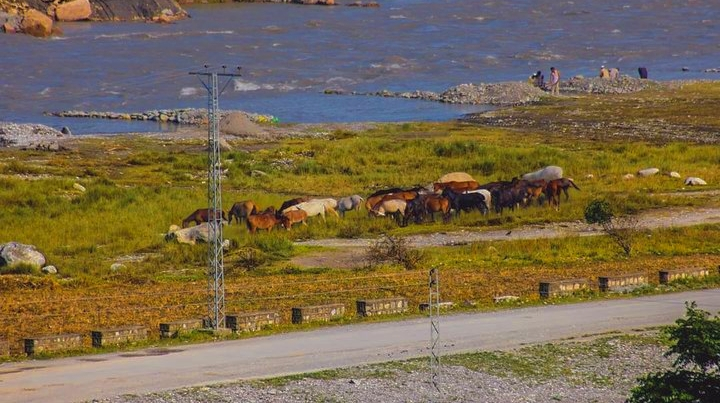
Karnol Image Gallery

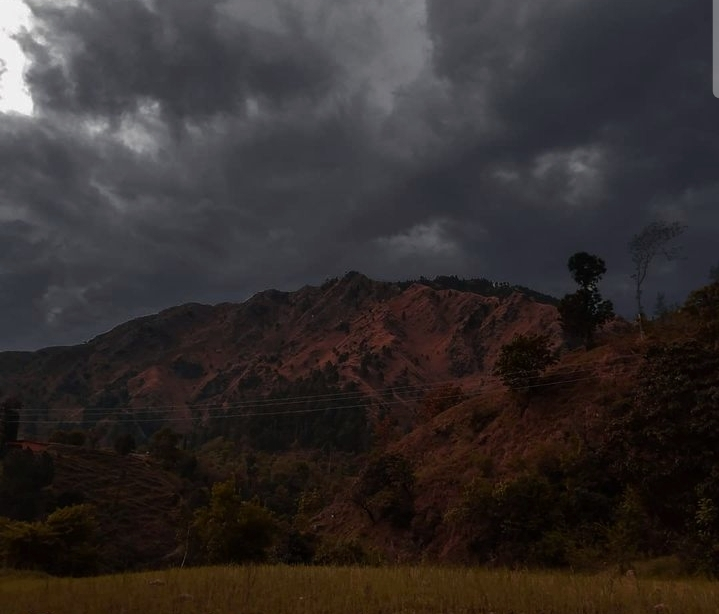
Karnol Image Gallery

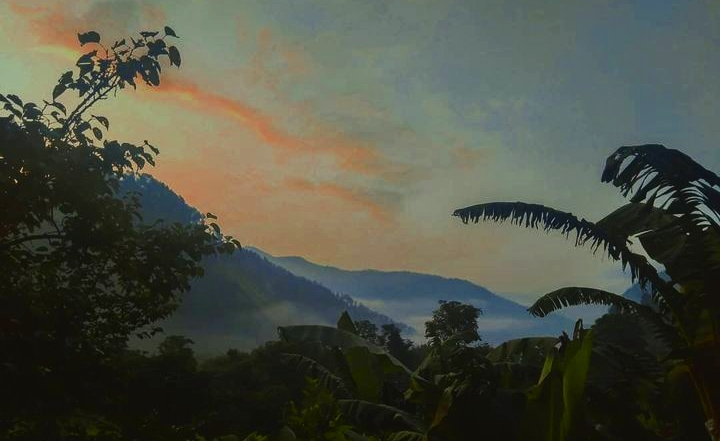
Karnol Image Gallery

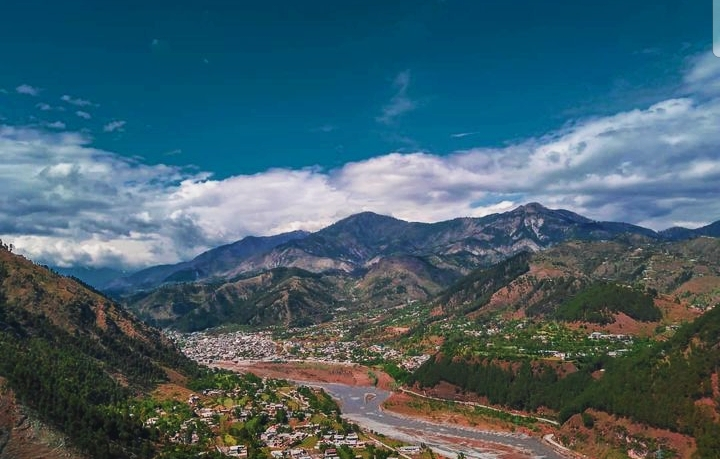
Karnol Image Gallery

== Organization ==
Most important decisions are decided by the headmen of Tribe Khankhail, the Jirga. (A term used mostly in Afghanistan/KPK for settlement of disputes)

=== Village Council ===
Candidates securing the highest and second highest number of votes in the local election are named as the Nazim and Naib Nazim of the village council or the neighborhood council.

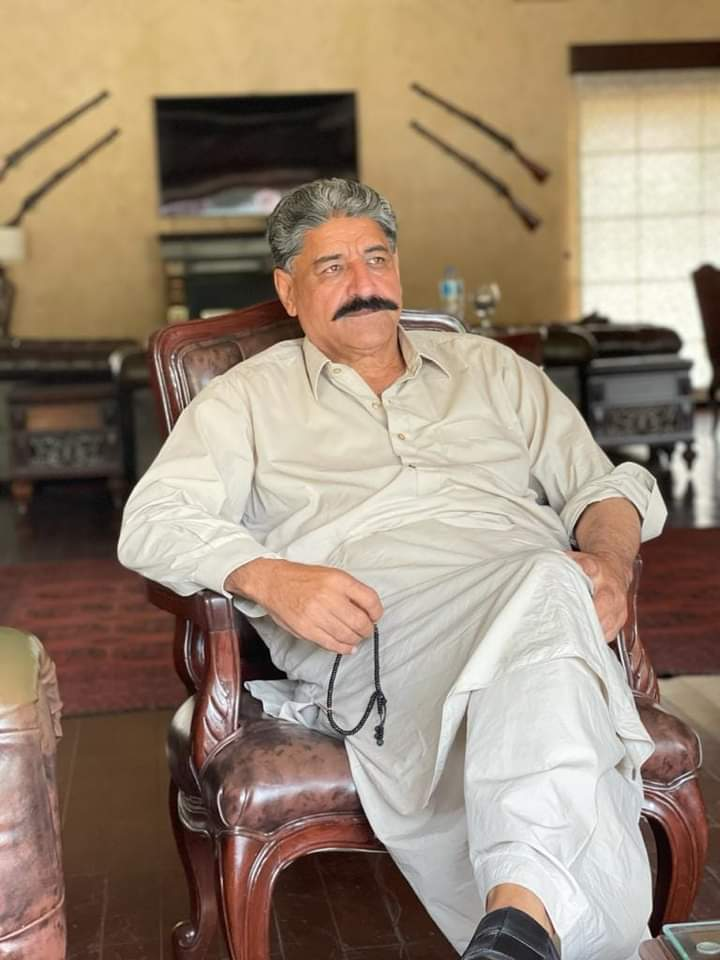
Khan of Karnol Sajid Ali Khankhail (Chairmain Village Council Karnol)

• Sajid Ali Khankhail was elected Chairman of Village Council Karnol in the last Local Body Election and won by majority votes.

== Notable Sites ==
• Dewri Khan Sahib

• Hujra Shoukat Nawaz Khankhail

• Sarwar Khankhail Cottage

• Banglaw Hills

• Bela (Playground/Garden)

• Jamiah Masjid, Khan Dewri

== Neighbourhood ==
1.Mohallah Dewri Khan Sahib

2.Mohallah Sarwar Khan abad

3.Purana Karnol (mostly inhabited by Syeds)

4.Mohallah Thanger

5.Jabbi

6.Mohallah Jab

7.Mohallah Sardaran

8.Mohallah Chahm

9.Bani

10.Purzen

11.Dakbanglaw

12.Gali

13.Mohallah Cheeran

14.Mohallah Laryan

== Historical Background ==
After Sa'adat Khan became the first ruler of Pakhal (1762–1780), he founded a village then known as Garhi Sa'adat Khan, on the banks of Kunhar River. The village is now known as Garhi Habibullah. Habibullah Khan was chief of the Swati tribe and had three sons: Ameer-Ullah Khan (Karnol), Muhammad Ameen Khan (Garhi Habibullah Khan), and Dost Muhammad Khan (Tarkanal).

After the death of Habibullah Khan, by the Code of Swatiwali/Pashtunwali, the eldest son is set to become the next chief. Ameer-Ullah Khan was the oldest son and had a right to become the new Chief of Swati tribe, but due to his religious beliefs, he gave his Chieftainship and Khanate to his younger sibling, Muhammad Ameen Khan. The area of the villages Karnol and Baralkot came into the share of Khan Ameer-Ullah Khan Sahib. After he came from Haveli, Dewri Garhi Habibullah founded this village. He was the Feudal Lord of Karnol and Baralkot, and as such, all revenue generated by these lands was given to him. He gave the people of Karnol lands for agriculture and homes. The family of Khan Ameer-Ullah Khankhail still lives in Karnol and have gained significant respect from the residents of the area.

The Swati Khankhails of Karnol are the descendants of only two sons (Bahadur Khan and Arsala Khan). The other three sons were killed during the Kargil War, along with their Grandfather Khan Habibullah Khan(Shaheed).

== Tribes ==
Tribes living in Karnol include:

- KHAN (Khankhail) Descendants of Sa'adat Khankhail Swati (ruler of Pakhli and Chief of Swati tribe) and Shaheed Habibullah Khan (I) the nominal Chief of Swati tribe
- Syeds(Saadats)
- Qureshi(Sarara)
- Abbasi(Dound)
- Raja
- Gujjar
- Rajput
- Kakakhel
- Awan
