= Satbani =

Coordinates: 34°34′N 73°19′E

- Village and union council
- Interactive map of Satbani
- Country: Pakistan
- Region: Khyber-Pakhtunkhwa
- District: Mansehra District
- Time zone: UTC+5 (PST)

Satbani is a village and union council (an administrative subdivision) of Mansehra District in the Khyber Pakhtunkhwa province of Pakistan. It is located in Balakot tehsil in an area that was affected by the 2005 Kashmir earthquake. On 3 September 2007, survivors of the earthquake from Satbani, Ghanool, Garlat and Kawai Union Councils organised a protest in Satbani against the authorities for the delay in compensation.
