= Suki Kinari Hydropower Project =

SK Hydropower Project
- Location within Pakistan
- Official name: Suki Kinari Hydropower Project
- Country: Pakistan
- Location: Balakot, Khyber Pakhtunkhwa, Pakistan
- Coordinates: 34°43′23.24″N 073°32′33.58″E
- Purpose: Water storage and Power generation
- Status: Operational
- Construction began: 2017
- Opening date: September 2024
- Construction cost: $2.0 Billion
- Owner: SK Hydro (Gezhouba Group)

Dam and spillways
- Type of dam: Embankment, asphalt concrete face, rock-fill
- Impounds: Kunhar River
- Height: 54.5 m (179 ft)
- Length: 336 m (1,102 ft)

Reservoir
- Maximum length: 3.1 km (1.9 mi)

Power Station
- Commission date: September 2024
- Type: Run-of-the-river
- Hydraulic head: 848 m (2,782 ft) (net)
- Turbines: 4 x 221 MW Pelton-type
- Installed capacity: 884 MW
- Annual generation: 3,212 GWh

SK Hydro also known as Suki Kinari HPP, is a run-of-the-river hydropower project located on the Kunhar River at Balakot Tehsil in District Mansehra, Khyber Pakhtunkhwa, which has an installed generation capacity of 884 MW.

The project's deal was finalized in 2014, with the financial closure occurring in January 2017. The project is sponsored by Chinese state-owned company Gezhouba Group, and is being constructed as part of the China–Pakistan Economic Corridor's "Early Harvest" projects.

The project was successfully commissioned on September 13, 2024.

== Background ==
The project was first envisaged in 1960, and feasibility studies have been carried out by German GTZ, Quebec based Montreal Engineering and recent detailed design and engineering study was performed by Mott MacDonald of England.

The Private Power and Infrastructure Board of Pakistan identified a number of sites in the country that were deemed attractive for their hydropower potential. In March 2005, PPIB publicly advertised seven hydropower sites for implementation in the private sector pursuant to the Policy for Power Generation Projects 2002.

SK Hydro Consortium, having the requisite technical and financial strength, submitted its bid for the Suki Kinari Hydropower project. The consortium was prequalified, and a Letter of Interest (LOI) for conducting a feasibility study of the project was issued to SK Hydro on 15 November 2005. The government of the province of Khyber Pakhtunkhwa, Pakistan, announced on August 24, 2016, that it has signed an agreement with SK Hydro Private Ltd. and Industrial and Commercial Bank of China to develop and construct the dam.

== Project details ==
The dam will be constructed as a 54.5 meter high and 336 meter wide concrete gravity dam with 2 gated spillways. Four 221 MW turbines are to be installed as part of the project, and will generate 884 MW of electricity in total.

Construction of the dam will result in the formation of a 3.1 kilometer long reservoir with a capacity of 9 million cubic meters of water. It will not cause large scale displacement of populations as no villages or towns will be inundated by the resulting dam's reservoir, although a four kilometer section of the Kaghan-Naran highway will have to be diverted as a result of construction works and the resulting reservoir.

Accompanying transmission lines will be constructed by Pakistan's National Transmission and Dispatch Company, and is not considered complementary to the project, but is to be constructed separately from the dam itself.

The project was successfully commissioned on September 13, 2024.

== Financing and tariff ==
The project is being built on a "Build, Own, Operate and Transfer" basis in accordance with Government of Pakistan's Policy for Power Generation Projects 2002. The dam is being developed by Pakistan's SK Hydro group and China's Gezhouba Group. In April 2015, an agreement for 75% of financing costs was signed by the developers and the Exim Bank of China and Industrial and Commercial Bank of China. The project achieved financial close on December 31, 2016.

The projected cost for the project was initially projected to be $1.314 billion, but as a result of devaluation of the Pakistani Rupee, the cost is now estimated to be $1.8 billion.

The Government of Pakistan has agreed to purchase electricity from SK Hydro at a cost of 8.8415 US cents per kilowatt-hour for the 30 years on the cost-plus basis.
