= Shohal Mazullah =

Coordinates: 34°29′N 73°22′E

Shohal Mazullah Khan Upper Pakhli
- Village & Union Council
- Interactive map of Shohal Mazullah Khan
- Country: Pakistan
- Region: Khyber-Pakhtunkhwa
- District: Mansehra District

Government
  - Land owner's: Khawajakheli Family Of Hassa and Balakot
- Time zone: UTC+5 (PST)
- Related villages: Patseri, Shagahi, Khangiri, Batangi, Bajmori, Alari, Jabbri, Kalish, Laso, Kawara, Narwa, Sanjorra, Seryyan, Marri, Batang, Kattwicharr, Galli

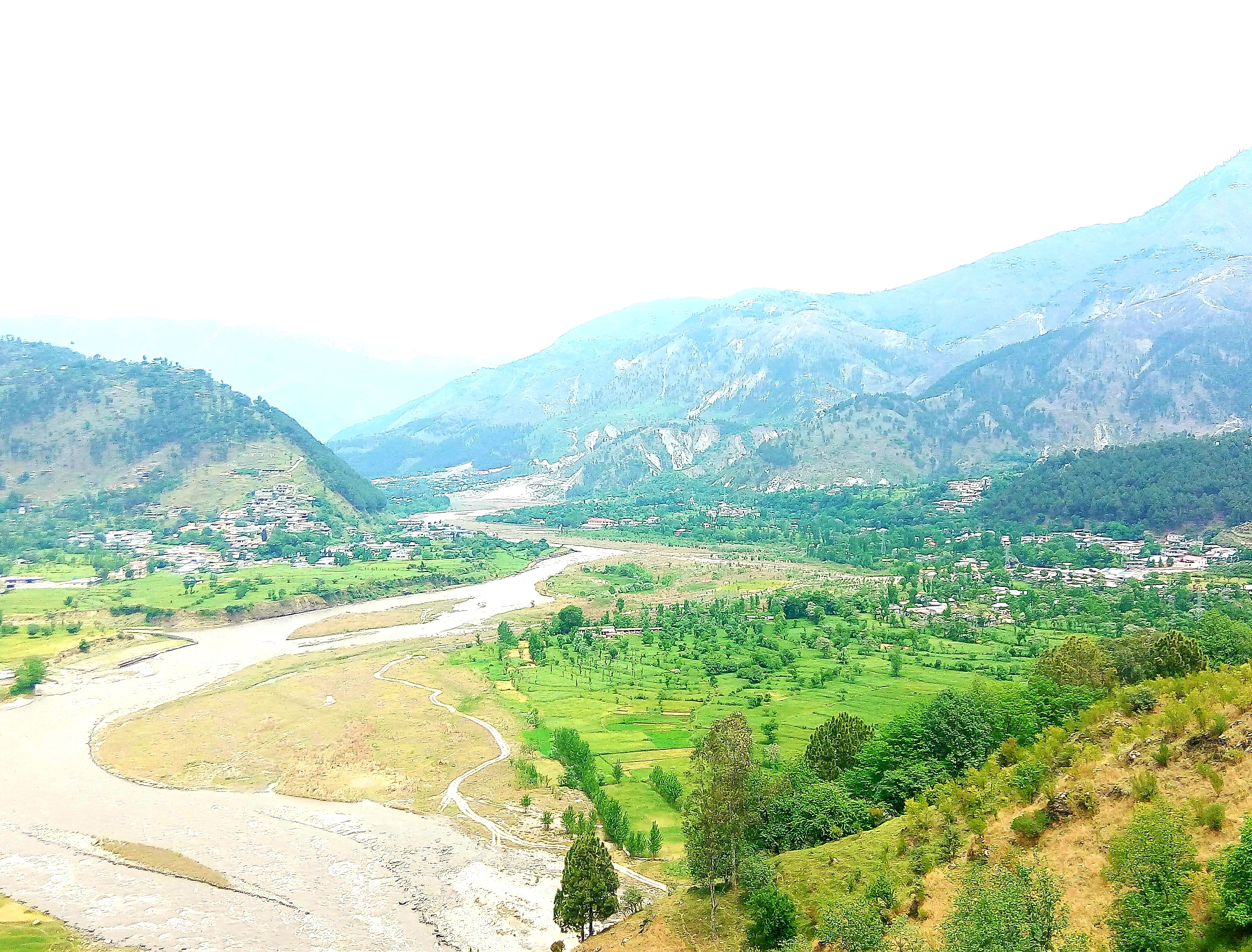

Shohal Mazullah Khan is a village and union council (an administrative subdivision) of Mansehra District in the Khyber Pakhtunkhwa province of Pakistan. It is located at the bank of Kunhar River, in the east of District Mansehra, about 7 km to Balakot and it borders Muzaffarabad District and lies in an area affected by the 2005 Kashmir earthquake.

The village was badly hit by the 2005 earthquake and was also destroyed in 1992 and 2010 by flood.

There are several middle and primary schools located in this village, including Govt Boys High School and Govt Girls High School. Govt Boys Degree College of Balakot is situated at the distance of 5 km, Govt College of Commerce Kot-Bhalla is located about 3 km distance and Govt Girls College is about 4 km distance from this village. The village is named after Mazullah Khan Lughmani Swati who was the Khan of VC Shohal main village during 1800s. The prominent Landords of overall UC Shohal Mazullah Khan is Swati tribe and Bomba tribe. Jabri and lasso Sultani were basically part of Muzzafarabad now administratively under UC Shohal Mazullah Khan in District Mansehra. The "Sultans of Jabri" are one the most famous grandsons of Sultans of Muzzafarabad. The other famous grandsons are the "Sultan of Boi" and one the prominent in them is Sultan Hassan Ali Khan of Boi (Jageerdar and Member of Parliament of Joint India on the seat of landlords).
