= Mahandri =

Coordinates: 34°41′N 73°35′E

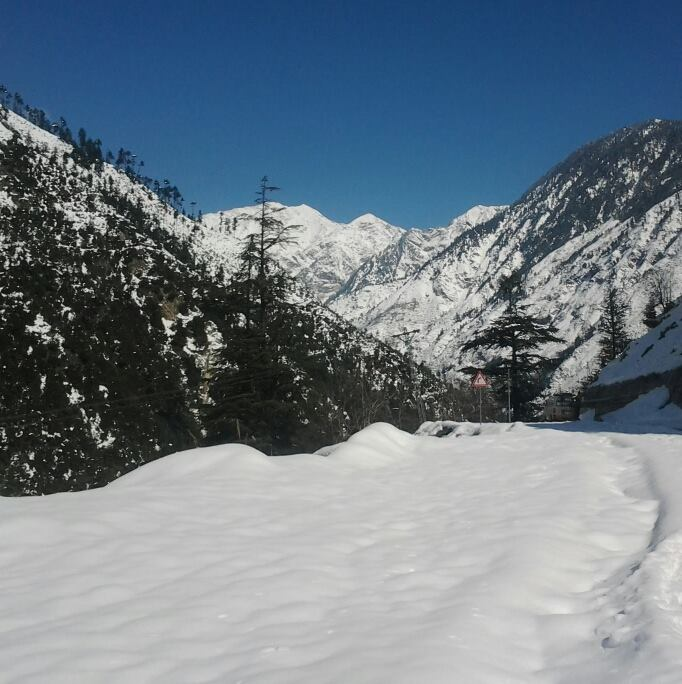

Mahandri is a village in the Kaghan Valley in the Mansehra District of Khyber Pakhtunkhwa province of Pakistan. A road from Balakot ascends along the Kunhar River through lovely forests to Mahandri and to the villages of Paras, Shinu and Jared. A trekking track to reach Ansoo Lake begins from Mahandri, which is 40 km below Naran Village, but this is an alternative to the Lake Saiful Muluk route and the difficulties are unknown.
