= Naran Valley =

Valley in Khyber Pakhtunkhwa, Pakistan

- Valley
- Country: Pakistan
- Province: Khyber Pakhtunkhwa
- District: Mansehra
- Tehsil: Balakot

Area
  - Total: 3,884 km^{2} (1,500 sq mi)
- Time zone: UTC+5 (PST)

The Naran or Narran (Hindko, Urdu: وادی ناران) is an alpine valley in Mansehra District of Khyber Pakhtunkhwa, Pakistan. Naran is a popular tourist attraction in Pakistan. It is a mountainous valley, with an elevation range of 2450 to 4100 meters above sea level (masl). Lulusar Dutipatsar National Park is located within the Naran valley.

== Demographics ==
Gujjar is a major and oldest ethnic tribe of the Naran Valley. Other tribes in the valley are Syeds, and Swatis.
