= Dana Meadows =

Dana Meadows may refer to:

- Donella Meadows, an American environmental scientist and writer
- Dana Meadows (California), a location in Yosemite National Park
- Dana Meadows (Pakistan), a location in Kaghan Valley
