= Ghanool =

Ghanool Valley
- Union Council and Village
- Country: Pakistan
- Region: Khyber-Pakhtunkhwa
- District: Mansehra District

Population
  - Total: 40,000
  - Density: 10/km^{2} (26/sq mi)
- Time zone: UTC+5 (PST)
- Postal code: 21300
- Area code: 0997

Ghanool is a village and union council (an administrative subdivision) of Mansehra District in the Khyber Pakhtunkhwa province of Pakistan. It is located in Balakot tehsil in an area that was affected by the 2005 Kashmir earthquake. The union council of Ghanool has four village councils: Ghanool, Sangar-1, Sangar-2, and Bhangian.

The Numberdars and Khans of Ghanool belong to the Arghushal sub-clan of the Swati tribe and own a significant portion of the region’s lands, including the picturesque Paye Meadows

Sangar is the most populous area of Ghanool with the majority of the population belonging to the Rajput tribe. Paya, which is also known as Sari and Paya, is a meadow at a height of more than 9000 feet. Makra Peak, a mountain 3885 meters above sea level, is located in Ghanool. Tribes living in Ghanool include Mughals Barlas, Rajputs, Awans, Swati, and Sardar.
