= Payee Lake =

Lake in Kaghan Valley, Pakistan

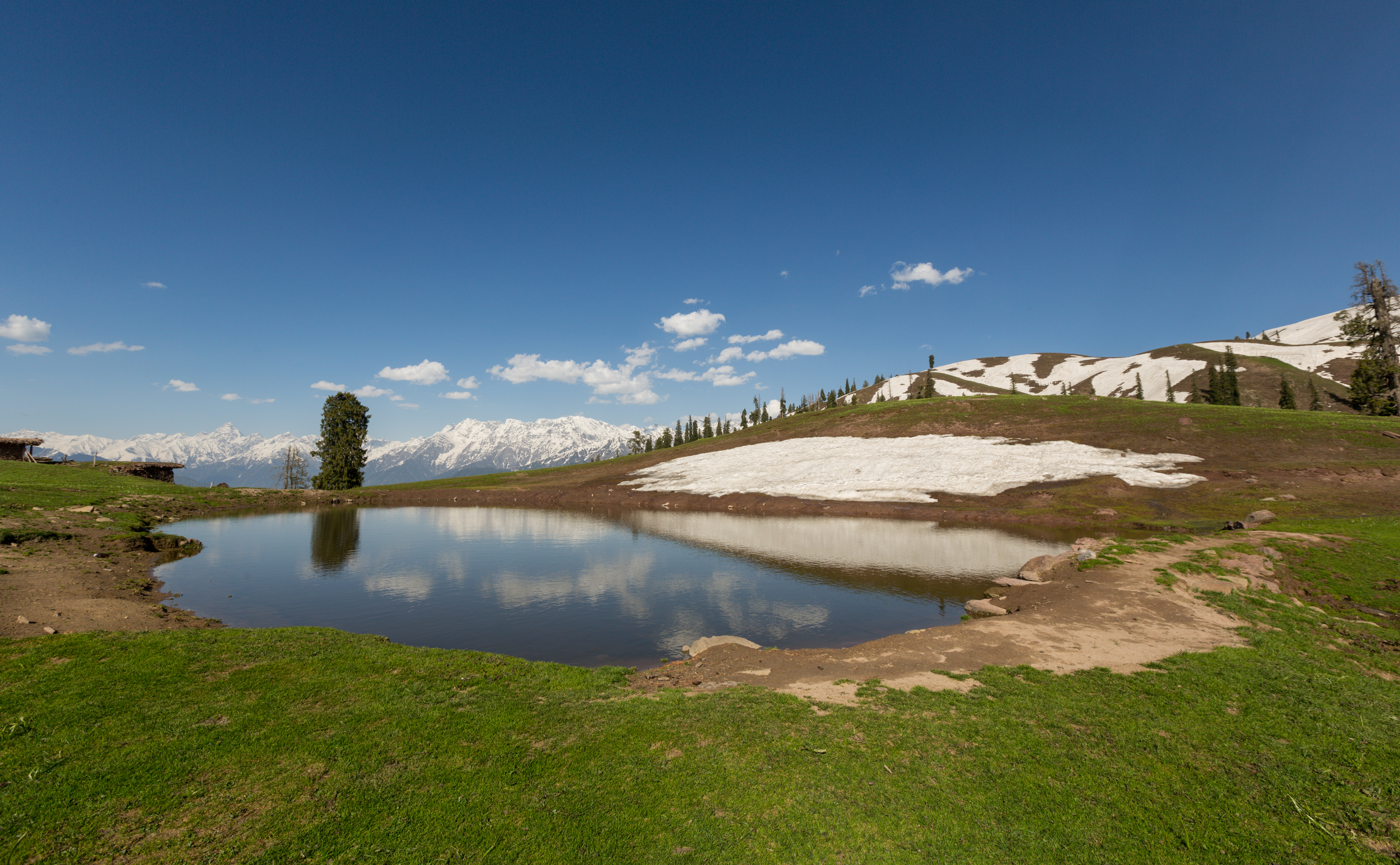
- Paaye Lake in spring

- Location within Khyber Pakhtunkhwa
- Location: Shogran, Kaghan Valley
- Coordinates: 34.6153°N 73.4867°E
- Type: Natural
- Basin countries: Pakistan
- Surface elevation: 2,895 metres (9,498 ft)
- Settlements: Shogran

Payee Lake (Urdu: پاے جھیل) is situated in the centre of a meadow in Payee, near Shogran in Kaghan Valley, in Pakistan's Khyber Pakhtunkhwa province. It is located at a height of almost 2,895 metres (9,498 ft). The peaks surrounding it are Makra Peak, Malika Parbat, Musa ka Musala and the mountains of Kashmir. The lake is accessible via Kiwai, passing through Shogran by a jeep track.

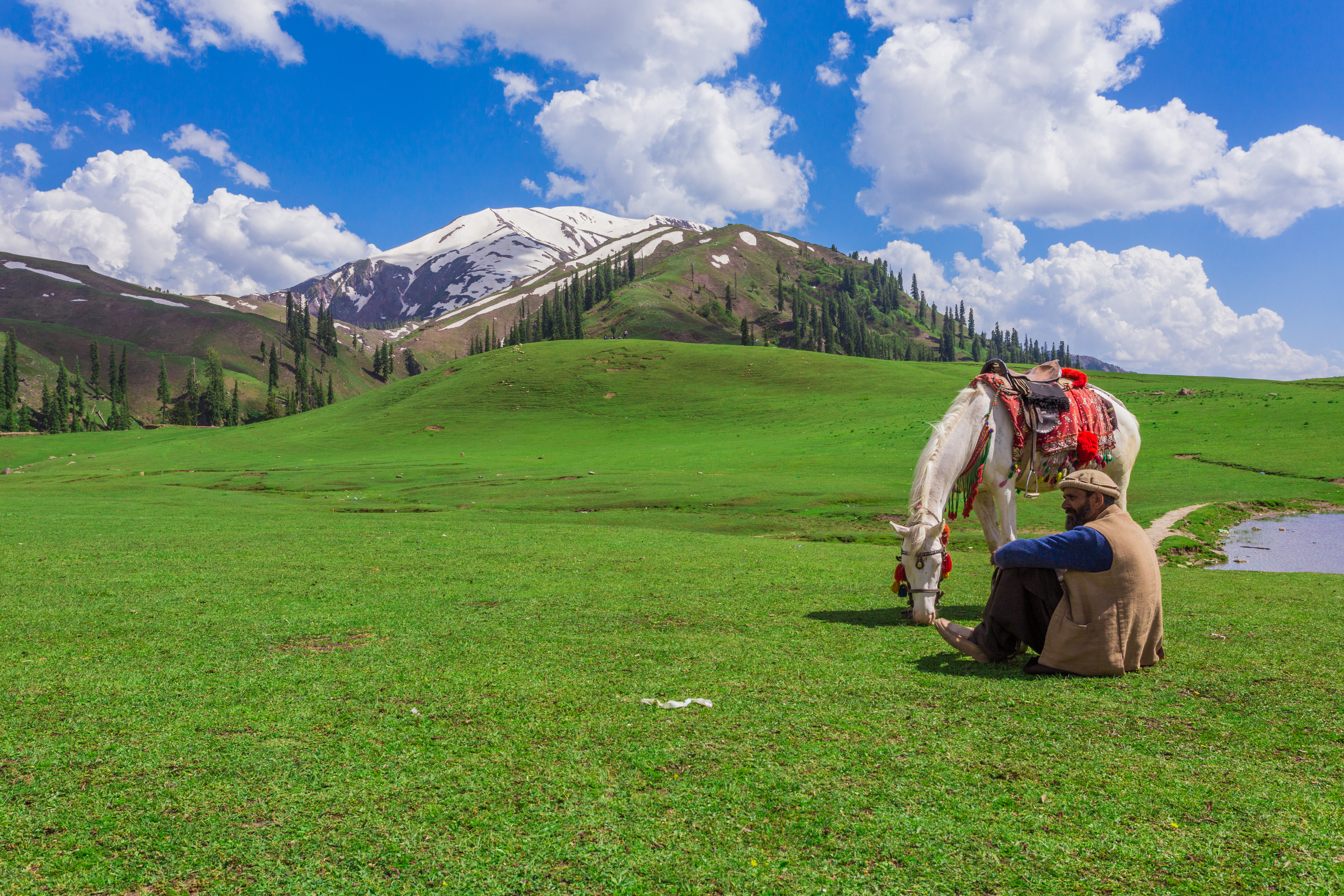
Meadows surround Payee Lake, Shogran

== See also ==
- Shogran
- Siri Lake
- Pyala Lake
- Kaghan Valley
- Naran
- Lake Saiful Muluk
