= Hangrai =

Coordinates: 34°38′N 73°22′E

Hangrai Ban Bagar
- Village and union council
- Interactive map of Hangrai
- Country: Pakistan
- Region: Khyber-Pakhtunkhwa
- District: Mansehra District

Government
  - Type: democratic
  - UC Nazim: Sardar Abdul Ghani
- Elevation: 1,500 m (5,000 ft)
- Time zone: UTC+5 (PST)
- Area code: 0997

Hangrai is a village and union council (an administrative subdivision) of Mansehra District in the Khyber Pakhtunkhwa province of Pakistan. It is located in the lower Kaghan Valley and lies to the north of Balakot city in an area that was affected by the 2005 Kashmir earthquake.

Gujjars are the main tribe living in this union council with a considerable percentage of Swatis, Mughals and Syeds. The literacy rate is very low. It was the most affected union council in 2005 earthquake. Many of the local people are farmers and herdsmen, though a lot of the people are working in the Middle East. Hangrai is known for its natural environment. Local attractions and places include Magra, Jhamra, Shadal, Laamri and Naddi. Naddi Bungalow, a forest rest house, built by the British India is situated in the middle of dense forest of Hangrai. The first ever taxonomist viz Danish Ali, who first explored the flora of Union council Hangrai (Ali et al. 2019).
