= Kaghan (town) =

- Town and union council
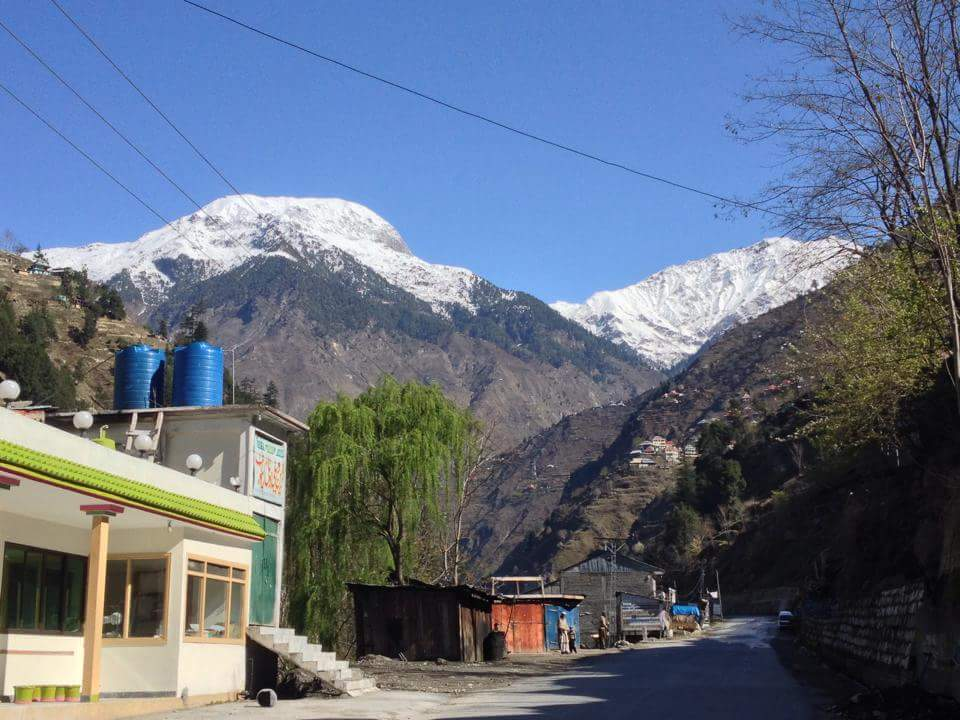
- Kaghan (town)

- Location in Khyber Pakhtunkhwa, Pakistan Kaghan (Pakistan)
- Coordinates: 34°46′49″N 73°31′27″E
- Country: Pakistan
- Province: Khyber Pakhtunkhwa
- District: Mansehra
- Tehsil: Balakot
- Time zone: UTC+5 (PST)

Kaghan (Urdu: کاغان) is a small town and union council of the Balakot Tehsil, in Mansehra District of Khyber Pakhtunkhwa province of Pakistan. It is located at 34°46'36N 73°31'31E in the Kaghan Valley which is named after the town.

Kaghan Union Council has 103 km of road and much of it susceptible to landslides. In research carried out by the German Bundesanstalt für Geowissenschaften und Rohstoffe, Federal Institute for Geosciences and Natural Resources, it was discovered of all the Union Councils in Mansehra and neighbouring Torghar districts "Kaghan UC is the most critical one" when it came to risk of landslides onto road.

Three villages within Kaghan Union council (UC), namely Kaghan, Lari and Batakund, took part in a study to see the impact of climate change on agriculture - it was determined that the majority of farmers was aged 35–50. It was also discovered that literacy was low and that females in particular faced barriers - factors being that schools were not readily accessible and not nearby.

In October 2005, an earthquake struck the region and damaged many homes, the rural landless programme helped those who were affected, the Earthquake Reconstruction & Rehabilitation Authority highlighted the example of a villager called Abdul Hameed (from the village of Khanian within Kaghan Union Council) who was granted land on which to build a new home.

== Politics ==
In 2002 Kaghan Union Council leader Syed Iftikhar Hussain Shah boycotted district council sessions over allegations of nepotism against the Nazim of Swat District. Shah, who died in June 2020, became the first nazim of Kaghan UC in the 2002 local government elections.

In 2014 the Balakot part of the Pakistan People’s Party was divided when the former Kaghan Union Council leader Raja Khalid Nawaz became tehsil president of Balakot, he was put into that role by PPP district president Malik Mohammad Farooq.
