= Dharamsar Lake =

- Location within Khyber Pakhtunkhwa
- Location: Kaghan Valley, Khyber-Pakhtunkhwa
- Coordinates: 35°5′53.34″N 74°5′50.28″E
- Lake type: Alpine/Glacial lake
- Part of: Indus River basin
- Primary inflows: Glacial water
- Basin countries: Pakistan
- Surface elevation: 3,690 m (12,110 ft)

Dharamsar Lake (Urdu: دھرم سر) is an alpine lake in the Kaghan Valley in the Khyber Pakhtunkhwa province of Pakistan. It is located approximately 3,690 metres (12,110 ft) above sea level to the left of Babusar Top going eastwards from Chilas on the Karakoram Highway, next to the larger Sambaksar ("sar" means "lake" locally) and Ganai Gali. Dharamsar lake is located close to Khyber Pakhtunkhwa's border with Azad Jammu and Kashmir just south of the meeting point of Khyber Pakhtunkhwa, Azad Kashmir and Gilgit-Baltistan.

== See also ==
- Lulusar Lake
- Dudipatsar Lake
