= Dana Meadows (Pakistan) =

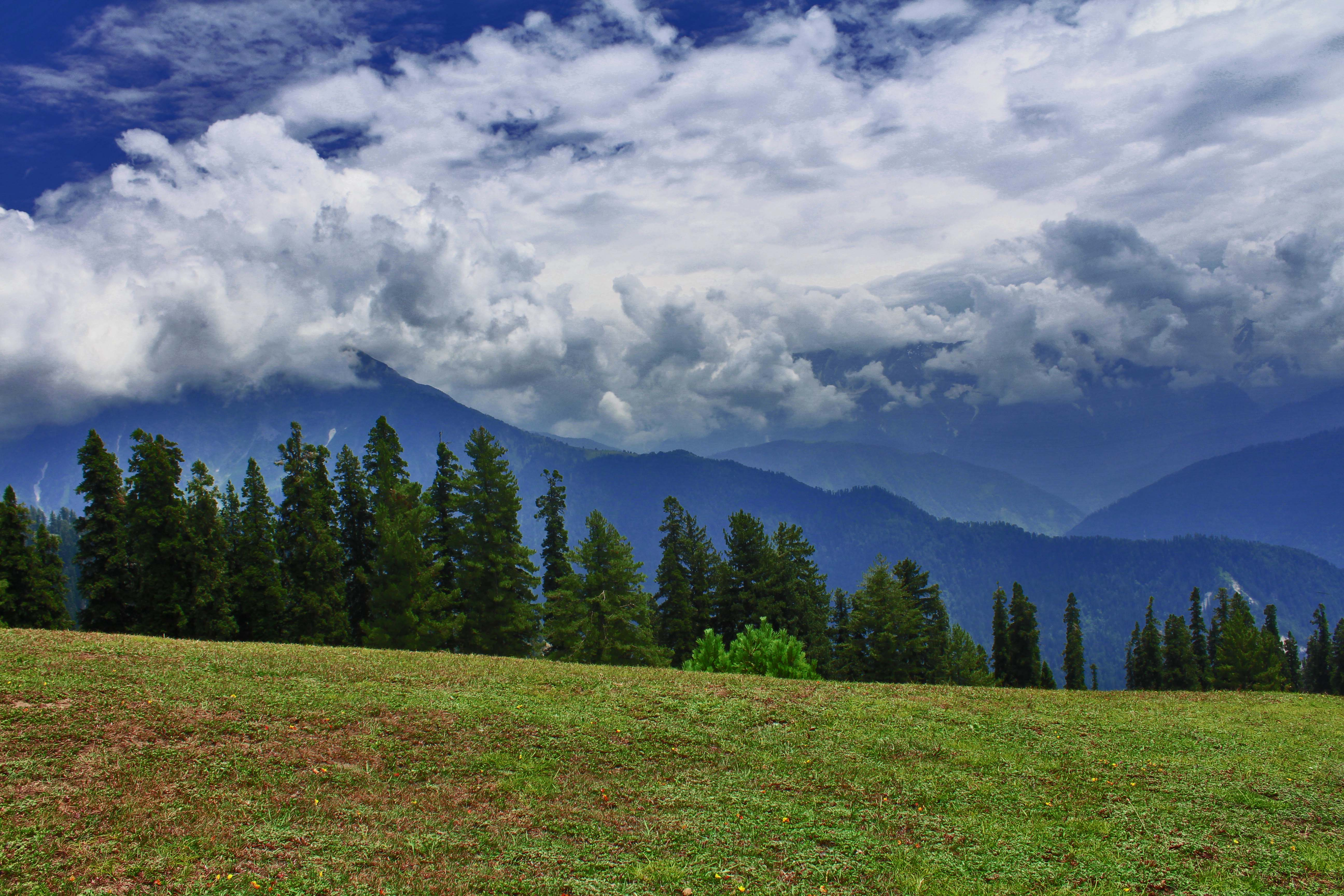
- Dana Meadows, Kaghan Valley
- Country: Pakistan
- Province: Khyber Pakhtunkhwa
- District: Mansehra District
- Elevation: 3,000 m (9,800 ft)

Dana Meadows are meadows located in the north-end of Kaghan Valley in Mansehra District of Khyber Pakhtunkhwa the province of Pakistan. Surrounded by Lower Himalayan mountain peaks with elevation of around 15,000 feet (4,600 m), the alpine meadows are located at an altitude of 10,000 feet (3,000 m).

Khanian is the starting point for a trip to Dana Meadows. The track to Dana Meadows was destroyed by the 2005 Kashmir earthquake which resulted the Jeep access to the meadows insurmountable.

== See also ==
- Khanian
- Shogran
- Kaghan Valley
