= Siri Lake =

Lake in Kaghan Valley, Pakistan

Siri lake
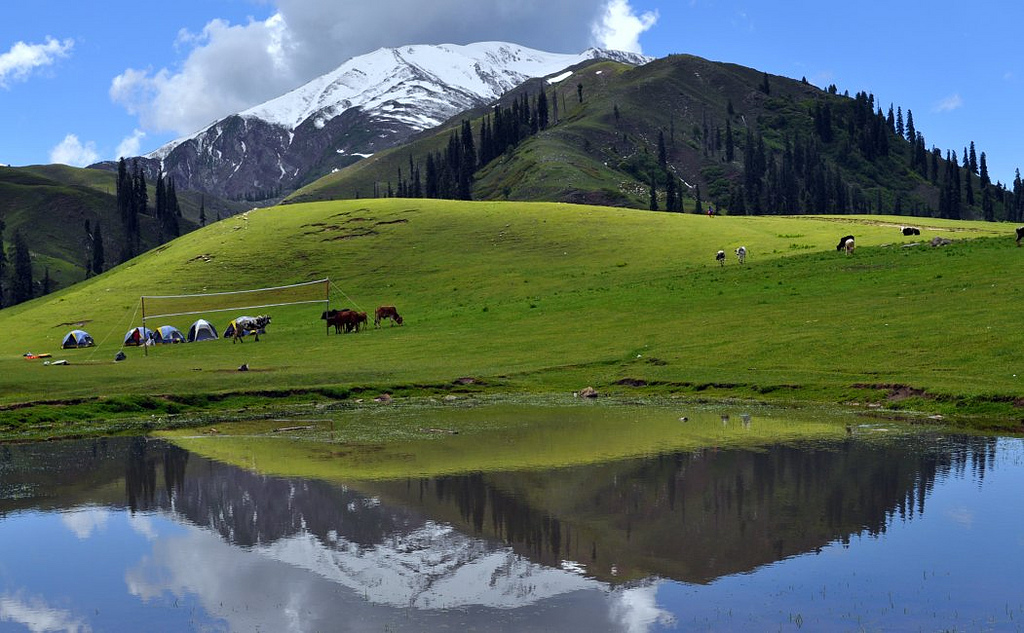

- Location within Khyber Pakhtunkhwa
- Location: Kaghan Valley, Mansehra District
- Coordinates: 34.6312°N 73.4920°E
- Basin countries: Pakistan
- Surface elevation: 2,590 metres (8,500 ft)
- Settlements: Shogran, Kaghan Valley

Siri Lake (Urdu: سری جھیل) is situated near Shogran in Siri, on the way to Payee Lake in Kaghan Valley of Khyber Pakhtunkhwa, Pakistan. It is located at a height of almost 2,590 metres (8,500 ft). The lake is accessible via Kiwai, passing through Shogran through a jeep track.

== See also ==
- Payee Lake
- Pyala Lake
- Batakundi
- Naran
