= Garhi Habibullah =

Garhi Habibullah Upper Pakhli
- Union council and town
- Garhi Habibullah
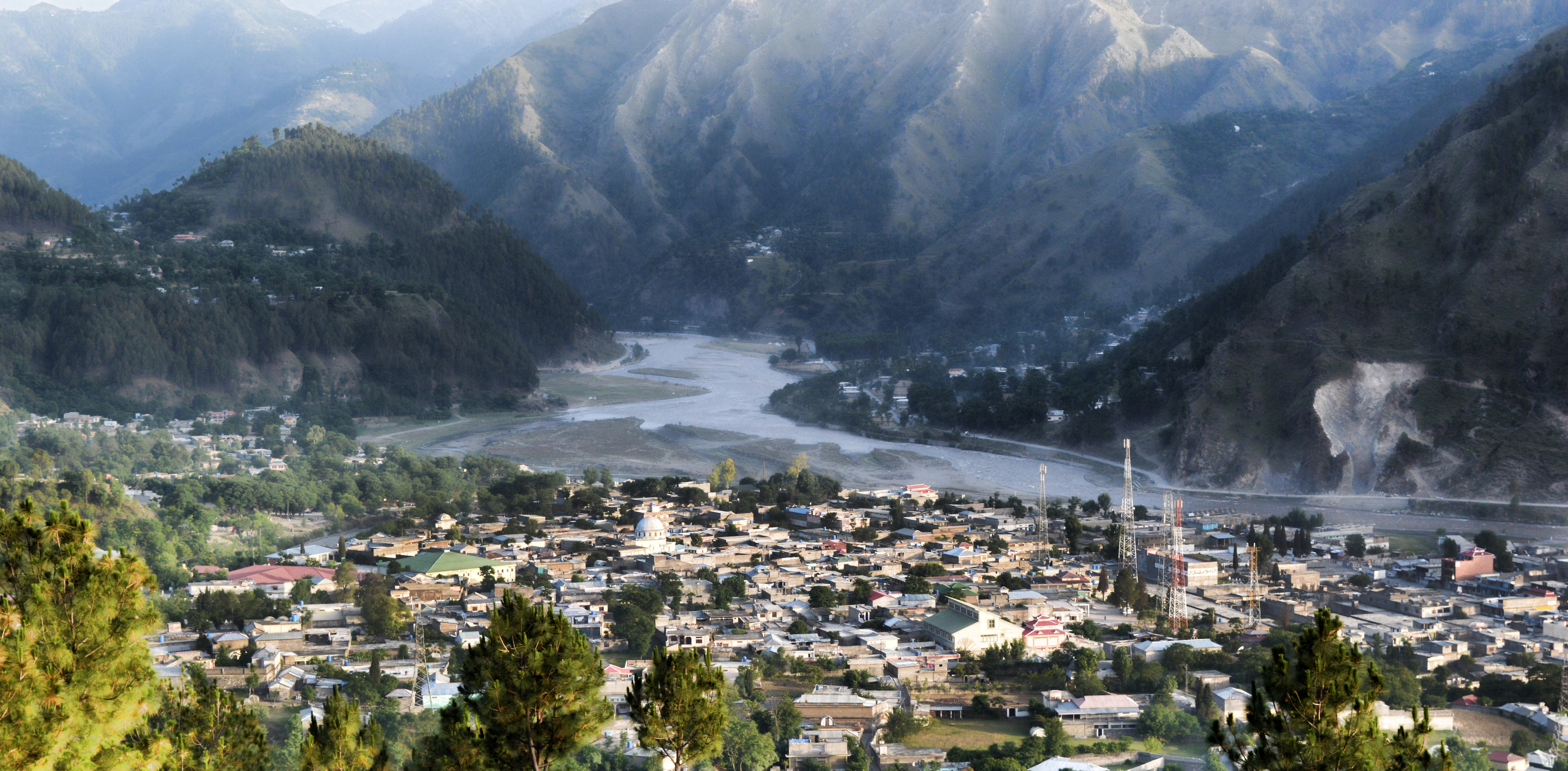
- A view of Garhi Habib Khan Jehangiri from Aznali Hills

- Location in Pakistan Garhi Habibullah (Pakistan)
- Coordinates: 34.4014°N 73.3803°E
- Country: Pakistan
- Region: Khyber-Pakhtunkhwa
- District: Mansehra District

Government
  - Type: Mayor
- Time zone: UTC+5 (PST)
- Area code: 0997

Garhi Habibullah is a town and union council (an administrative subdivision) of Mansehra District in the Khyber Pakhtunkhwa province of Pakistan. It is located in Balakot Tehsil, to the east of the district capital Mansehra, towards the Kashmir frontier (near Muzaffarabad, the capital of Azad Kashmir). It was affected by the 2005 Kashmir earthquake.

Garhi Habibullah is basically divided into 5 separate Khanates. 1) Khanate of Samundar Khan Khankhail Swati, Khanate of Habib Khan Jehangiri Swati, Khanate of Ameen Khan Jehangiri Swati, Khanate of Hassan Ali Khan Arghushal Swati and Khanate of Behram Khan Sarkheli Swati.

== Notes from Major Abbot’s Diary ==
On 10 June 1847 - Boundary Commissioner James Abbott, who would later become First Deputy Commissioner of Hazara, noted in his journal:

"Marched to Hubeeb-oolla ke Gurhi, a mud castle on the eastern bank of the Koonhar river. This stream of small span is just now 10 feet deep and racing past with great velocity. It cannot be passed by boat nor is there any ford, but an excellent bridge has been constructed across it, passable by loaded bullocks, the abutments being formed of piles of fagots supporting projecting beams of timber over which the stems of trees are laid These are boarded for the causeway, and the projecting limbers of the abutments are held down by large heaps of boulders. This bridge, which is common in the mountains for streams of small space, might at small expense be made durable but at present it is generally swept away by the floods of the monsoon. The boundary here is not easily arranged owing to the estate of the Jaghirdar, Sooltan Hooseyn Khaun, lying across the Koonhar and the Jelum, whilst that of the Jaghirdar, Umeen Khaun, lies on both sides of the Koonhar. These men are very tenacious of ancestral possessions and would not willingly take any exchange. Umeen Khaun’s jaghir might be disposed of by bringing it all into the Lahore boundary and making his eastern boundary (a mountain ridge well defined) the boundary of the kingdoms; but Sooltan Hooseyn’s lands westward of the Jelum will, I fear, occasion much difficulty, as the resumption or forced exchange would be an unpopular act in these parts, and it would be difficult, if possible, to ensure to him bond fide possession of anything given him in exchange by the Jumboo Government. The Jumboo Government claims Hubeeb-oolla's castle, but so far as I have yet heard it seems to me part of the dependency of Huzara. From hence northward the road is so extremely difficult that I fear I must retrace my steps as far as Pukli, in order to find a traversable path northward."

The following day Abbott made the following entry in his journal:

"Hubeeb-oolla's castle —Halted here to-day to allow Mr. Agnew to rejoin me. I can, however, hear nothing of his movements. Rode out to explore the boundary of Umeen-oolla’s jaghir.Eastward a high spur projected from the snowy mountains. I believe the Huzara boundary from that point westward will prove to be a snowy ridge. But nothing certain can be learnt at this distance Some of the tribes have never paid tribute, and others have been brought to pay even an assessment last year (sic). None of the countries yield a revenue worth the expense of collection, but it is important to obtain tribute for Lahore from as many of them as possible, to prevent their being invaded or oppressed by the Jumboo Government. This narrow valley is hot and is said to be unhealthy during the monsoon."

Abbott remained in Garhi Habibullah until the 13th of June awaiting contact from Vans Agnew - he had been delayed to protracted negotiations with the Dhund tribe, the next day (14 June) he set off for Shinkiari.

== First Settlement 1872 ==
Garhi Habibullah underwent its first formal land settlement under the British administration in 1872. During this process, the region was organized into five estates, locally referred to as hundis or turfs. These five estates were:

1. Estate of Samundar Khan Khankhail Swati
2. Estate of Habib Khan Jehangiri Swati
3. Estate of Ameen Khan Jehangiri Swati
4. Estate of Hassan Ali Khan Arghushal Swati
5. Estate of Behram Khan Sarkheli Swati

Approximately fourteen different Gabri families from 7 different Gabri Swati clans were recognized as Ala Malkans (principal landlords) within these five estates, while other residents were classified as tenants, kasabgars and adna maliks .

== Tribes ==
- Swati
- Tanoli
- Qureshi
- Awan
- Mughal
- Rajput
