= Garlat =

Coordinates: 34°33′N 73°21′E

- Union council and town
- Interactive map of Garlat
- Country: Pakistan
- Region: Khyber-Pakhtunkhwa
- District: Mansehra District

Government
  - Type: Union Council
- Time zone: UTC+5 (PST)
- PPO: 21230

Garlat is a village and union council (an administrative subdivision) of Mansehra District in Balakot tehsil in the Khyber Pakhtunkhwa province of Pakistan. It is in an area that was severely affected by the 2005 Kashmir earthquake.
