= Kaghan Valley =

Valley in Khyber Pakhtunkhwa, Pakistan

Kaghan Valley وادی کاغان
- Valley
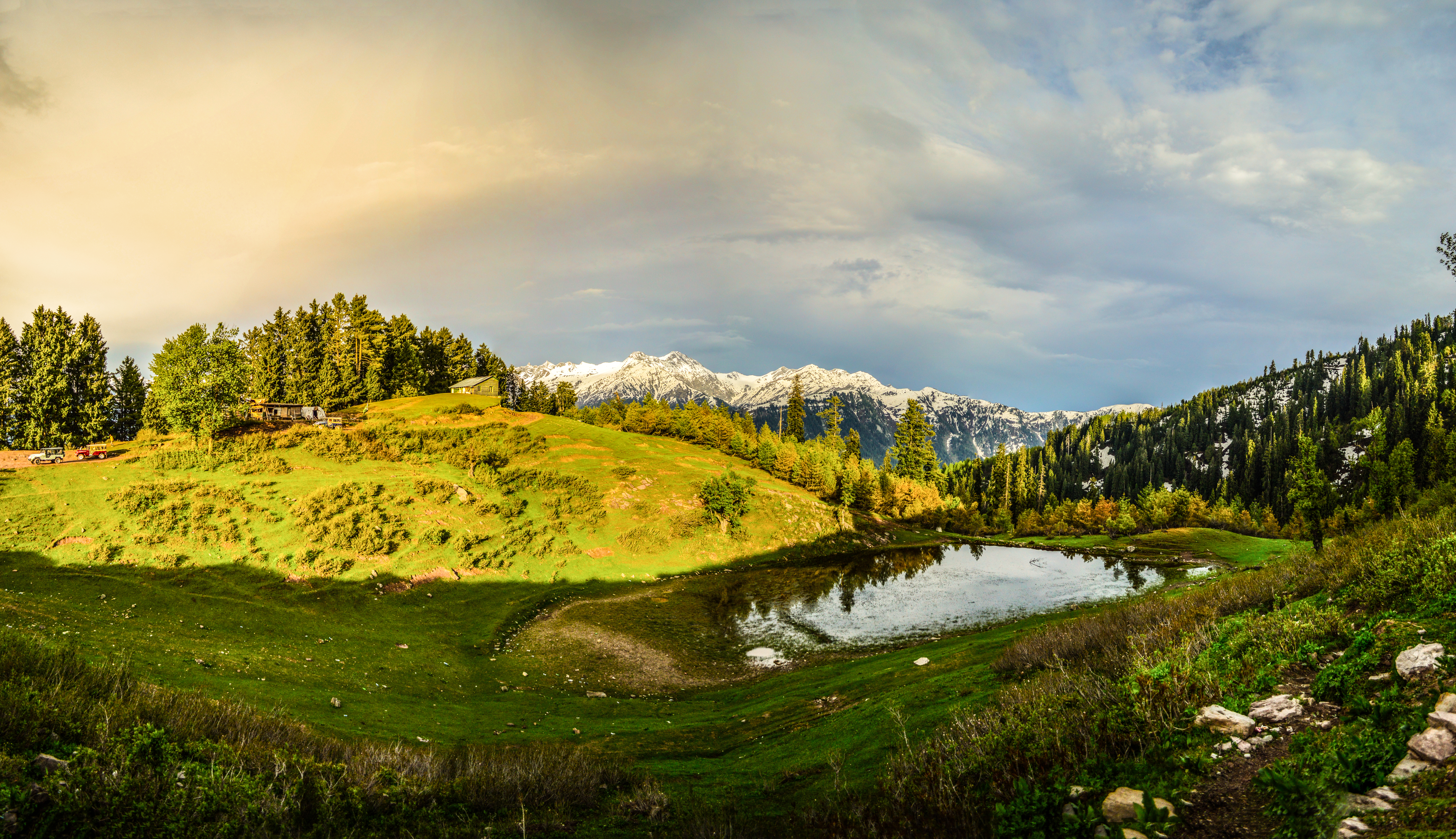
- Siri Paye meadows near Shogran, a hill station in the valley photographed c. May 2017

- Location within Khyber Pakhtunkhwa Location within Pakistan
- Coordinates: 34°50′N 73°31′E
- Country: Pakistan
- Province: Khyber Pakhtunkhwa
- District: Mansehra
- Tehsil: Balakot
- Time zone: UTC+5 (PST)

The Kaghan Valley (Hindko, Urdu: وادئ کاغان) is an alpine river valley traversed by Kunhar River in Mansehra District of Khyber Pakhtunkhwa, Pakistan. The valley stretches 155 kilometres (96 mi) in northern Pakistan, rising from its lowest elevation of 650 m (2,134 ft) to the Babusar Pass around 4,170 m (13,690 ft). The highest mountain peak in the valley, known as Malika Parbat (lit. 'Queen of Mountains'), stands at a height of around 5,290 metres (17,360 ft).

Landslides triggered by the devastating 2005 Kashmir earthquake destroyed many passes leading into the valley, though roads have since been rebuilt. Kaghan is a popular tourist attraction in Pakistan.

== Geography ==
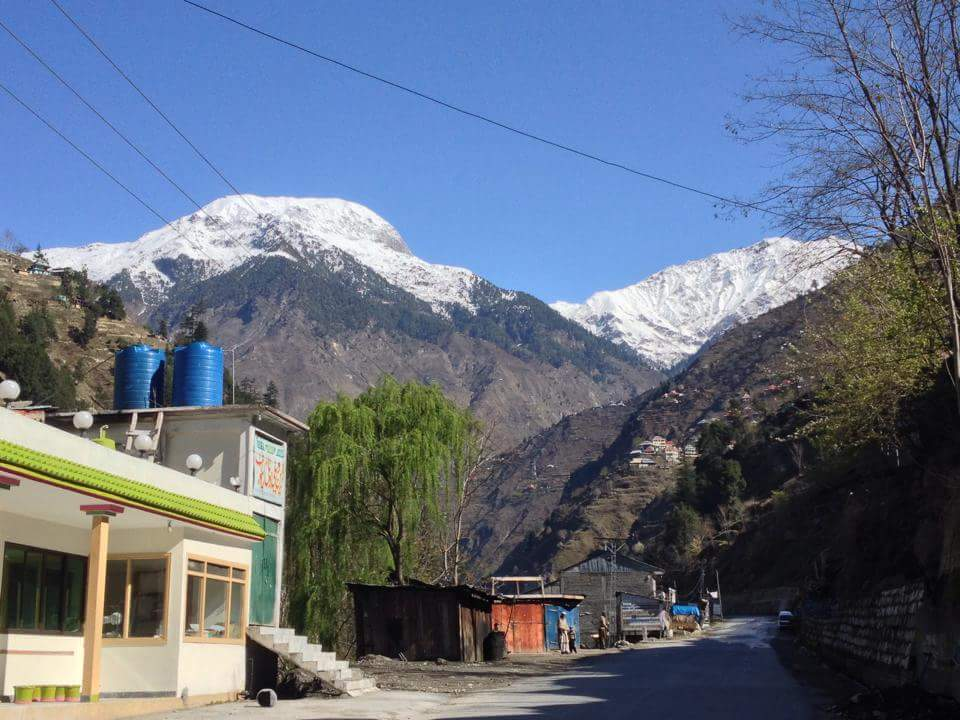
The widespread valley is named after a small town Kaghan which is a union council of the Balakot tehsil.

The Kaghan Valley is located in the Hazara region of Pakistan, and borders the Pakistani-administered territories of Gilgit-Baltistan and Azad Kashmir to the north and east, respectively. From here, the Mansehra-Naran-Jalkhad (MNJ) Road leads to Gilgit Baltistan. The 155-kilometre-long valley is enveloped by the Lower Himalayan mountain range, resulting in an alpine climate and the prevalence of pine and deodar forests and alpine meadows. Alongside the Kunhar River flowing within the valley, it features glaciers, clear lakes, waterfalls and mountain streams.

=== Lakes and National Parks ===
The natural freshwater lakes of the valley which are tourist attractions include Saiful Muluk, Pyala, Ansoo, Lulusar, Dharamsar, Dudipatsar, Siri and Payee lakes. There are two national parks in the valley, lower parts of the valley constitute the Naran region and Saiful Muluk National Park with Saiful Muluk Lake while the upper parts in the north constitute Lulusar-Dudipatsar National Park covering along the Naran-Chilas road the Dhramsar, Dudipatsar, Lulusar and six other lakes and hilly areas of the Himalayan Range. The Babusar Pass, which is at the end of Khyber Pakhtunkhwa lies within the latter.

The Kaghan is known for its scenery and landscapes, resulting in its popularity as a summertime resort amongst locals and tourists alike. Annually, tourists come from across the country and outside to visit the valley. In June 2024, more than 300,000 tourists arrived in the valley during the Eid al-Adha holidays.

== Notable sites ==
- Shogran, a hill station which lies on a plateau at an elevation of 2,362 metres (7,749 ft). Malika Parbat, the highest mountain peak in the valley, is visible from the nearby Siri Paye meadows which are surrounded by Makra Peak.

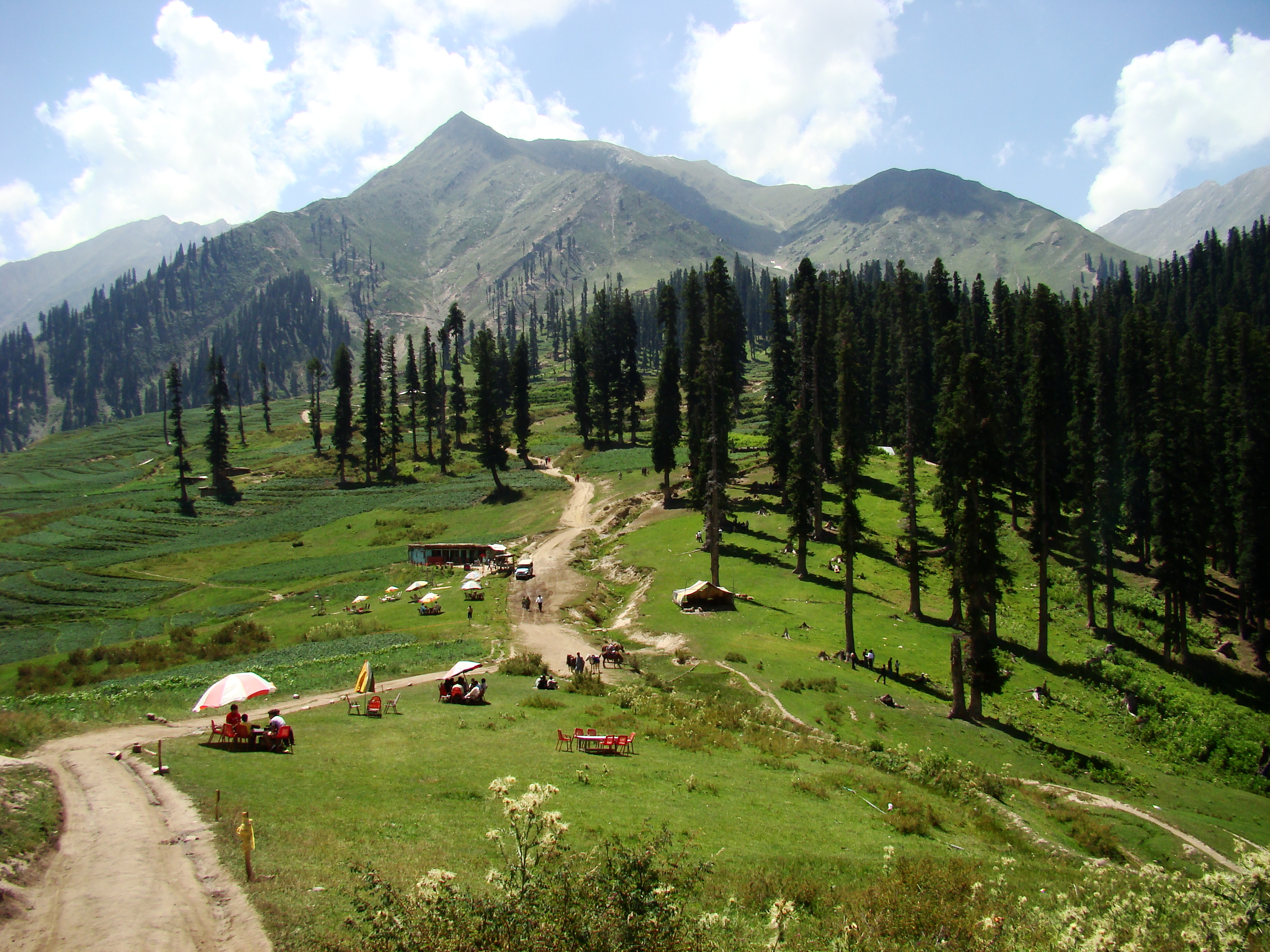
Green hills at Lalazar

- Lalazar, a tourist spot at an elevation of 3,123 metres (10,246 ft) above the sea level, is located in the lower part of the valley.

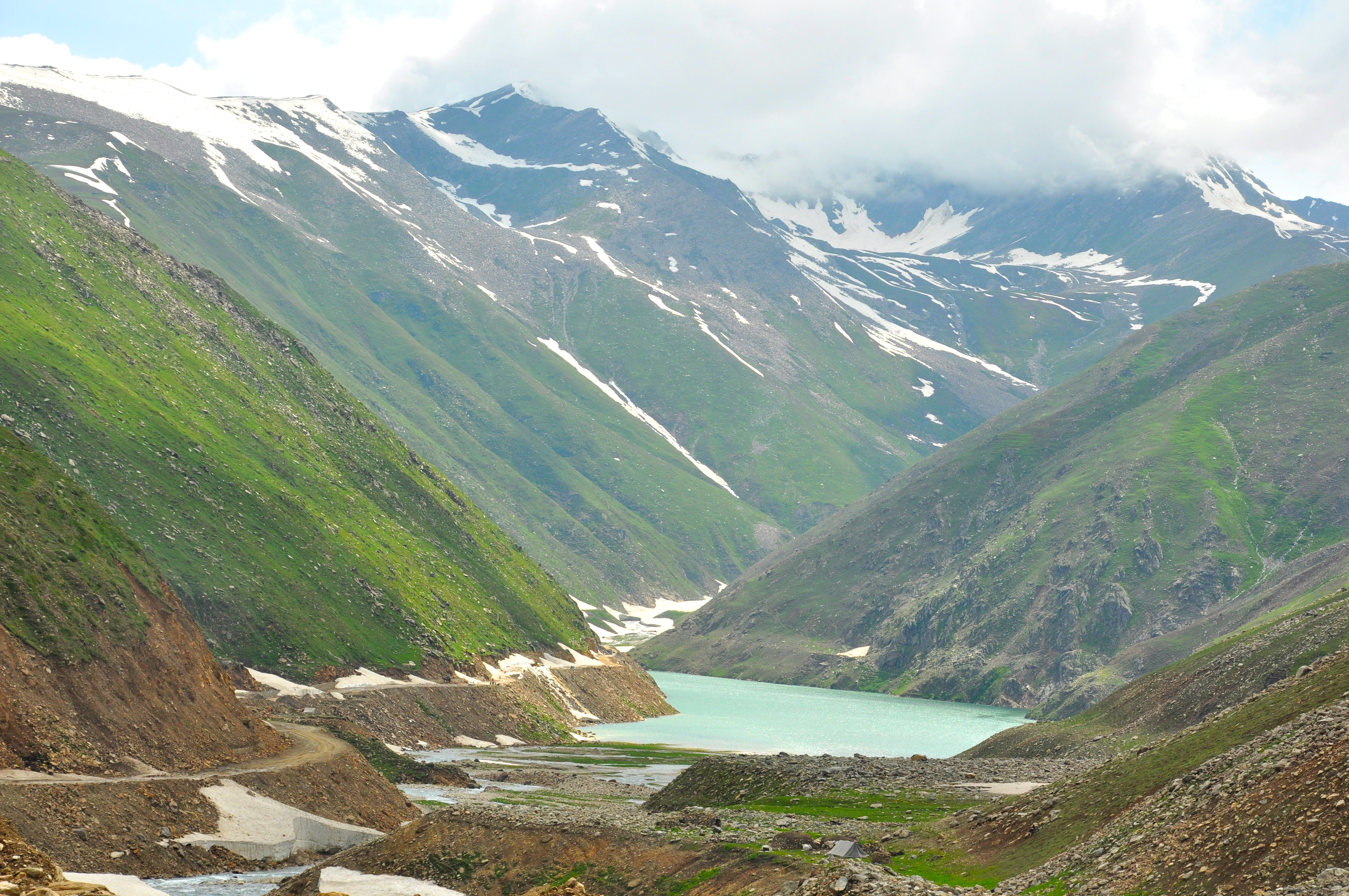
Lulusar Lake between hills

- Lulusar, a group of mountain peaks and a lake at a height of 3,410 m (11,190 ft). The lake is the primary headwaters of the Kunhar River. It flows southwest through the entire length of the valley, passing Jalkhand, Naran, Jared, Paras and Balakot until its confluence with the Jhelum River.

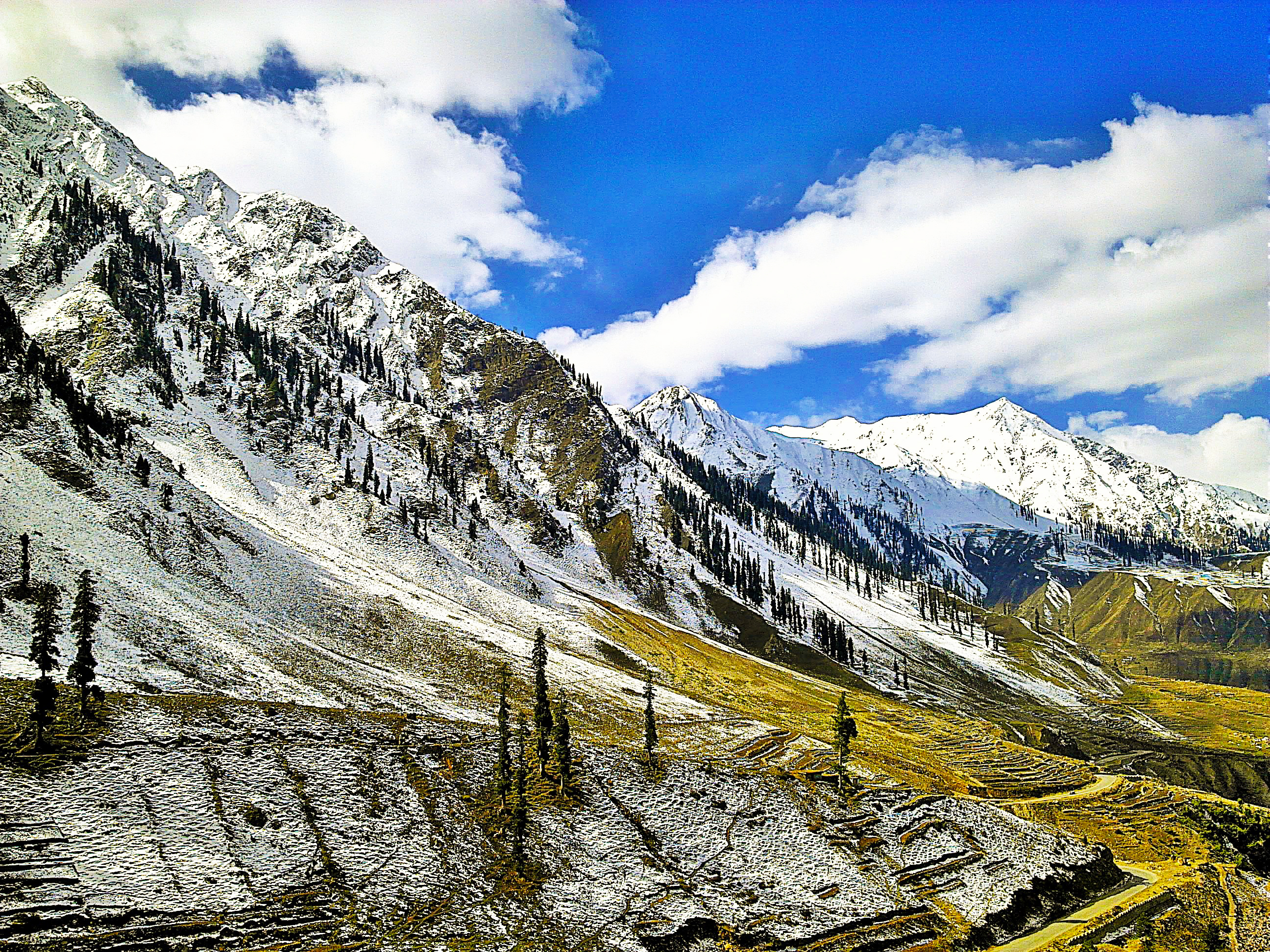
A view of Jalkhand

- Jalkhand, a town about 40 kilometres (25 mi) away from Naran. Pyala Lake lies in the town.

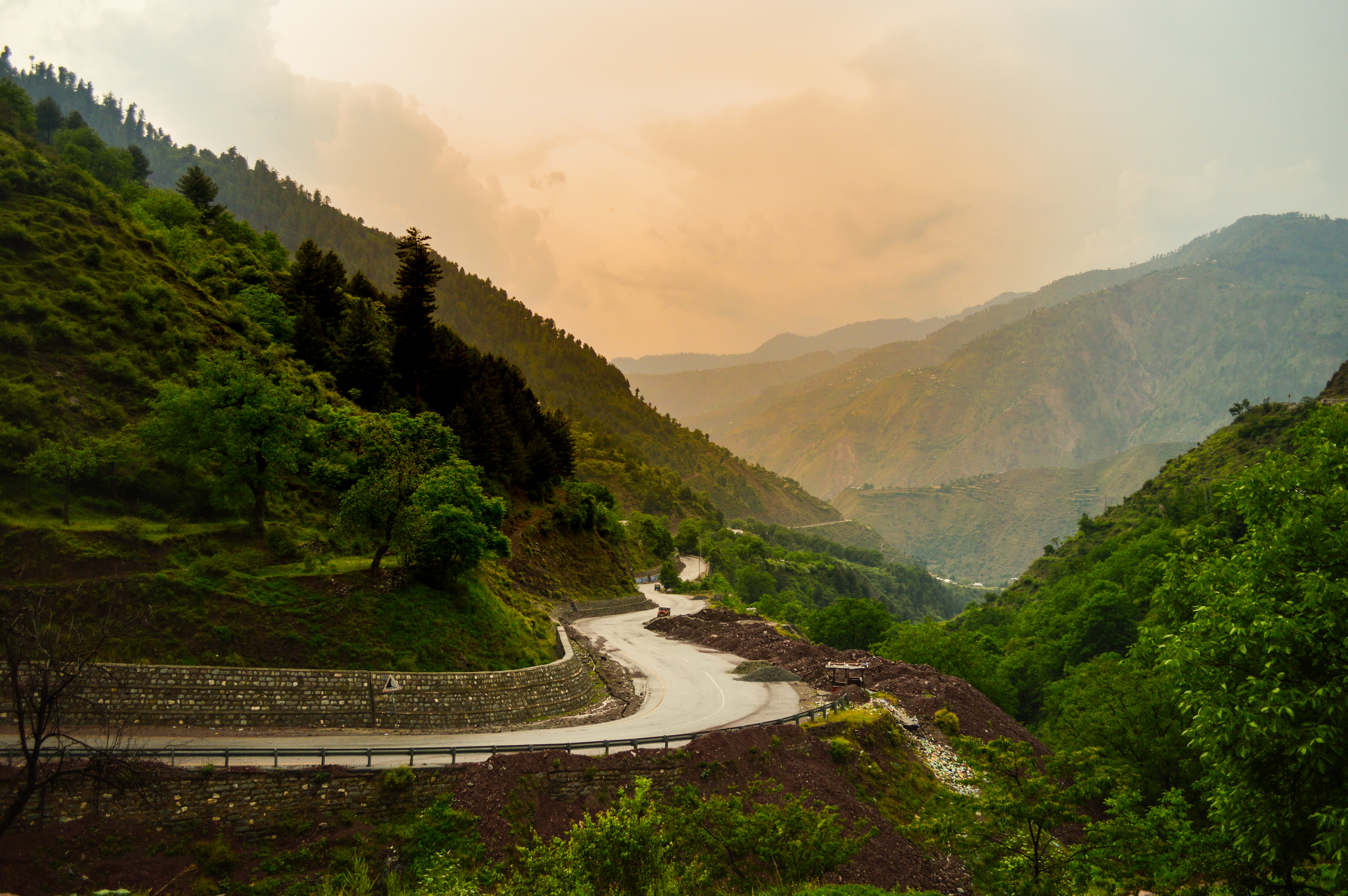
A scene of path in Kiwai

- Kiwai, a village known for Kiwai waterfalls near Shogran.
- Khanian, also spelt Khania, is a small village in the north of the valley. It is located on the right bank of the Kunhar River. It is the starting point for a trip to Kamal Ban Forest and Dana Meadows. There are several resorts in Khanian.

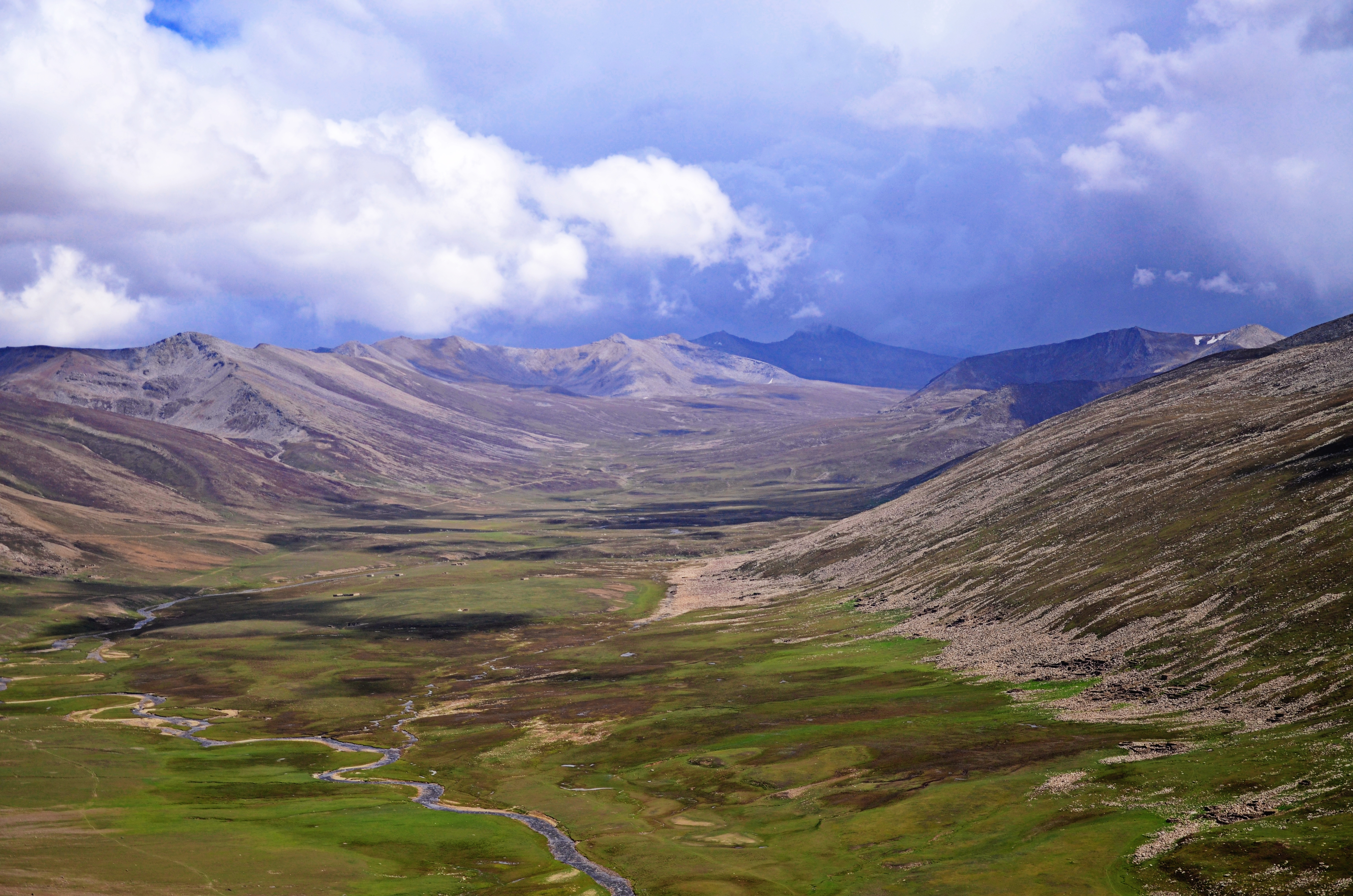
A cloudy view of Gittidas Meadow

- Gittidas, a meadow at an elevation of 3,678 metres (12,067 ft) in the upper part prior to Babusar Top, the end point of the valley. Nearby the meadows, are the Dharamsar and Sambaksar lakes. To the north, it further leads to Azad Kashmir.

== Flora ==
The forest known as Kaghan Temperate Coniferous Forest is home to many plants species. These include Cedrus deodara, Pinus wallichiana, Abies pindrow, Taxus wallichiana, Picea smithiana, and broad-leaved plants such as Juglans regia, Aesculus indica, Prunus padus, Fraxinus excelscior, Ailanthus glandulosa, Diospyrus lotus, Morus alba and Ficus indica. In 2020, an ethnobotanical survey conducted in valley reported the uses of Cederella serrata for treating chronic infantile dysentery.

== Demographics ==
=== Languages ===
Besides mostly Hindko-speaking residents, there is also an outspread of Pashto and Gujari-speaking groups in the valley.

=== Ethnic groups ===
Gujars are a major ethnic group in Kaghan Valley and are spread throughout the valley. The other communities residing in the region including Syed, Kashmiris, Pashtuns, and Swati, and Mughal families.

== Transport ==
The Kaghan Valley can be reached by road via Balakot through Mansehra and Abbottabad. In Balakot, public buses and other vehicular transport can be used to travel to the valley. Additionally, the Kaghan Valley can also be reached from Peshawar or the national capital of Islamabad by renting a car to Abbottabad or Mansehra; tourists can then order a taxi or other available methods of public transport to go to the valley.

The valley is accessible during the summer and closed to visitors during winter. This is because glaciers block the roads leading to the Kaghan during winter, although these glaciers typically melt between February and April. From May to the end of September, the roads and Babusar Pass usually remain open. In May, temperatures can reach up to 11 °C (52 °F) and stoop as low as 3 °C (37 °F). In 2020, the Kaghan Development Authority (KDA) was established under an act passed by Khyber Pakhtunkhwa Assembly. The authority work for the development and management services in the valley.

== See also ==
- Panjkora Valley
- Swat Valley

== Sources ==
- "Kagan Valley". Encyclopedia Britannica. 1 October 2013.
- Ali, Ihsan (2006). Mapping and Documentation of the Cultural Assets of Kaghan Valley, Mansehra. UNESCO, Islamabad: UNESCO. pp. 10–46.
- Braham, Trevor (1965). Dr. K.Biswas (ed.). "Mountains of Kaghan, 1965". The Himalayan Journal. 26 – via The Himalayan Club.
- Jamal, Zafar (2009). Biodiversity, Ethnobotany and Conservation status of the flora of Kaghan Valley Mansehra, NWFP. Pakistan (PDF). Islamabad: Quaid-i-Azam University.
- Khan, M. Asif, ed. (2000). Tectonics of the Nanga Parbat syntaxis and the Western Himalaya. London: Geological Society. pp. 411–423. ISBN 978-18-62-39061-4.
- Shakirullah, J Ahmad, H Nawaz (2016). Recent Archaeological Exploration of the Upper Kaghan Valley, Mansehra, Pakistan. 45th Annual Conference on South Asia.
