= Kunhar River =

Coordinates: 34°17′N 73°29′E

Kunhar
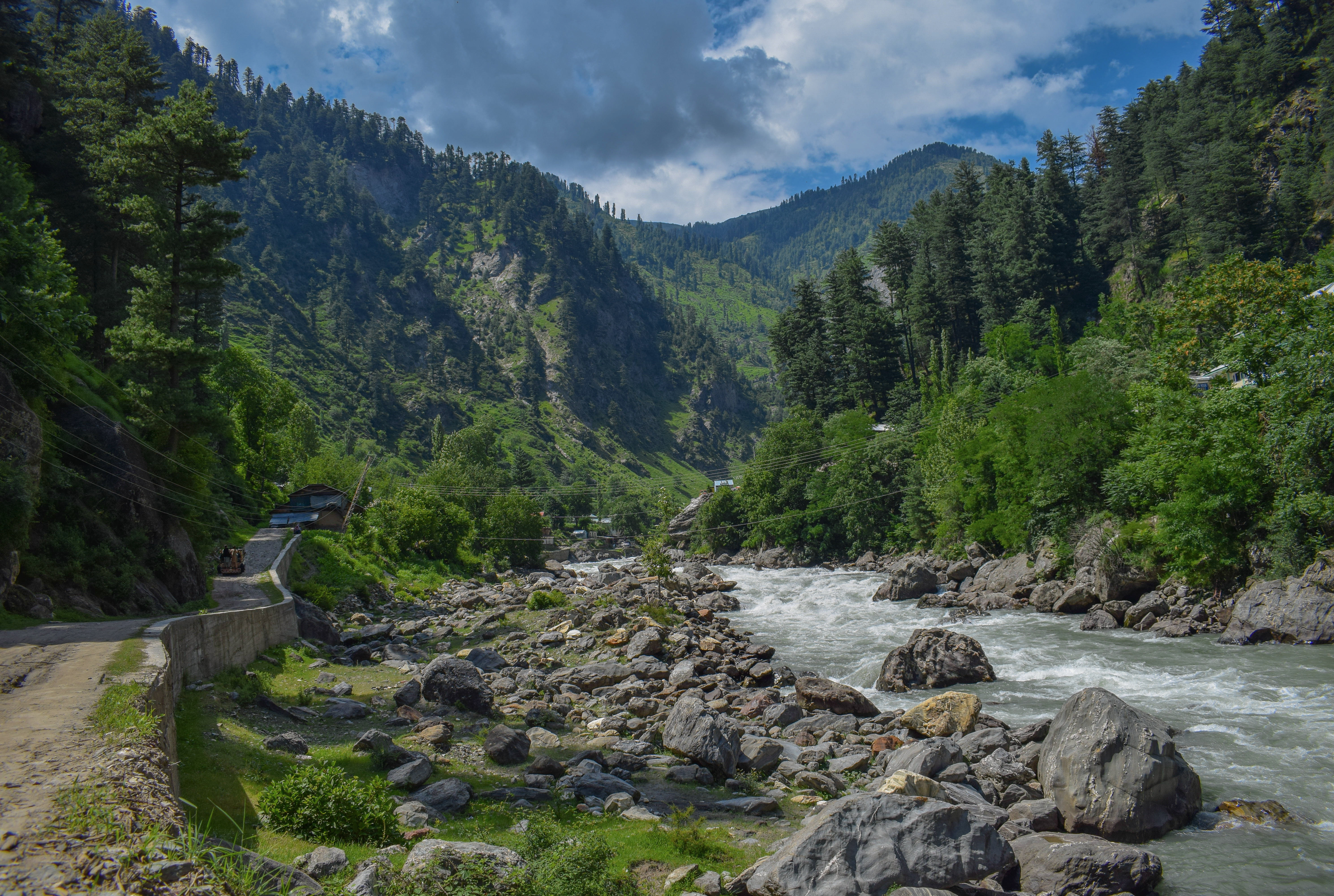
- Kunhar River, Khyber Pakhtunkhwa
- Native name: دریائے کنہار (Urdu)

Location
- Country: Pakistan
- province: Khyber Pakhtunkhwa
- District: Mansehra District

Physical characteristics
- Source: Lulusar lake
  - elevation: 3,950 m (12,960 ft)
- Mouth: Jhelum River
  - location: Muzaffarabad
- Length: 177 km (110 mi)
- Discharge
  - location: Garhi Habibullah
  - average: 101 m^{3}/s (3,600 cu ft/s) (from period 1961 to 2000)

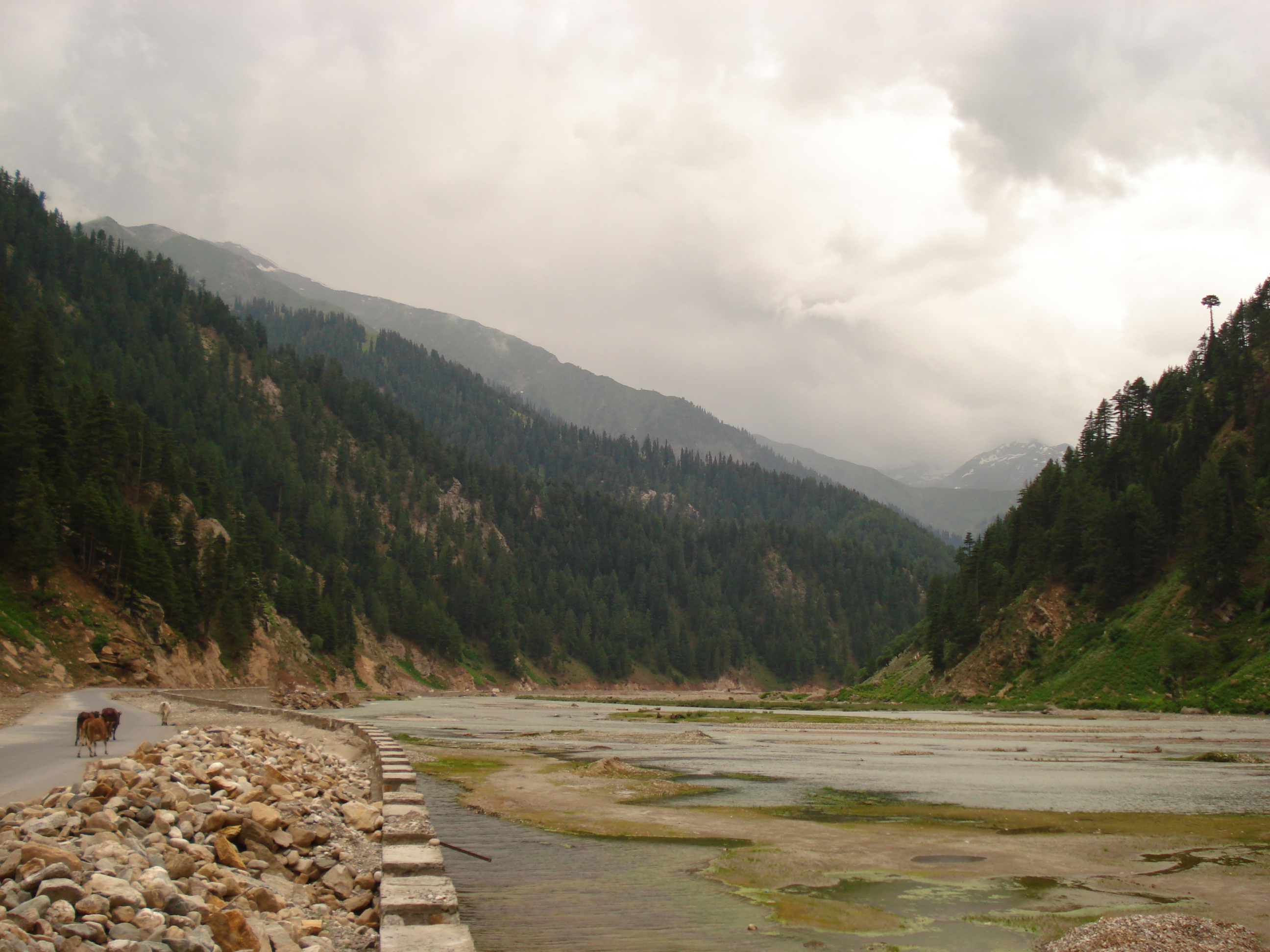
Kunhar River in the Kaghan Valley, Khyber Pakhtunkhwa, Pakistan.

The Kunhar River (Urdu: دریائے کنہار) or River Kunhar, is a 177 kilometres (110 mi) long river, located primarily in the Khyber Pakhtunkhwa province, northern Pakistan. It is in the Indus River watershed basin.

== Origin and route ==
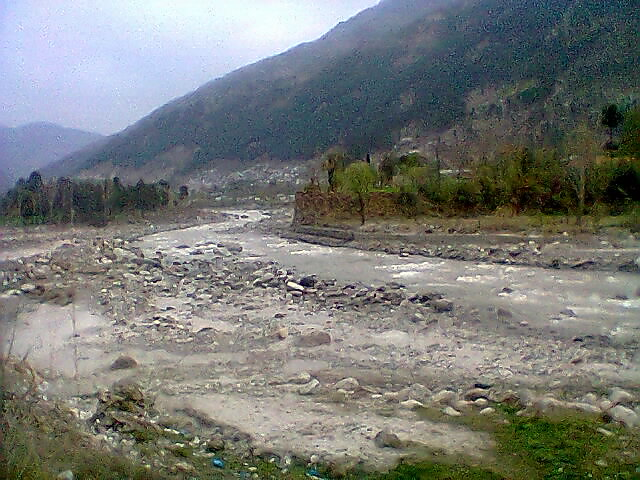
The view of River Kunhar flowing from Tehsil Balakot, District Mansehra during winters.

Kunhar is the main river in the Naran Valley. It originates from the Lulusar Lake, near the Babusar Pass at the elevation of 3455m, in the Kaghan Valley. Melting snow and natural tributaries are the main source of water for the Kunhar River. It joins Jhelum River at Pattan. Kunhar is the present name of the river which was named 'Darya e Nainsukh' [ repose of the eyes] by Emperor Jahangir.5

== See also ==
- List of rivers of Pakistan
