= Swati people (Pakistan) =

Ethnic group mostly in Hazara, Pakistan

Swatis (Urdu: سواتی) are an ethnic group inhabiting the Hazara Division in the Khyber Pakhtunkhwa province of Pakistan.

The Swati people are of Dardic origins, originally speaking Dardic languages such as Gibri and Yadri, and were native inhabitants of Swat Valley. They were displaced following the Pashtun Yusufzai occupation of Swat in the 16th century and forced to settle in Kohistan. In historic accounts, Pashtuns referred to Swatis as "Dehgan"; this was not an ethnic designation but simply referred to the fact that they were villagers. They are also sometimes called Tajiks, a common ethnonym used by Pashtuns to describe their Dardic neighbours. Hemphil (2009) rejects Ibbetson's (1916:95–6) assertion of Swatis as a "race of Hindu origin" from peninsular India, suggesting, instead, that Swatis show a higher affinity to their neighbours in the northwest and with people in the Indus Valley, to the south.

== See also ==
- Hindkowans
- Gujars
- Awans
- Hazara region
