= List of people from Mansehra =

List of people from district Mansehra

This is a list of notable people who were born in, lived in, or grew up in Mansehra, Pakistan.

== Health and Education ==
- Abdul Jamil Khan Arghushal Swati (SI) — Former Federal Minister for Population and Welfare; former Director General Health Pakistan; founding principal of Ayub Medical College and Frontier Medical College; former President of the Pakistan Medical and Dental Council

== Judiciary ==
- Bashir Khan Jehangiri Swati — Former Chief Justice of the Supreme Court of Pakistan
- Ejaz Khan Arghushal Swati — Current Chief Justice of the Baluchistan High Court
- Zeenat Khan Arghushal Swati — Former Chief Justice of the Gilgit-Baltistan Chief Court
- Abdul Hakeem Khan Lughmani Swati — Former acting Governor of Khyber Pakhtunkhwa and Former Chief Justice of the Peshawar High Court
- Muhammad Raza Khan Begal Swati — Former Chief Justice of the Peshawar High Court
- Ejaz Afzal Khankhail Swati — Former Chief Justice of the Peshawar High Court and acting Chief Justice of Supreme Court of Pakistan
- Tariq Mehmood Jahangiri Swati, Justice of Islamabad High Court

== Politics ==
- Azam Khan Swati — Senator and Federal Minister
- Babar Saleem Khan Jahangiri Swati — Speaker of the Khyber Pakhtunkhwa Assembly; Member of the Provincial Assembly
- Faiz Muhammad Khan Swati — Former MNA Mansehra
- Faheem Khan Swati— Former MNA Karachi III
- Ghulam Ghaus Hazarvi Swati — Former MNA (Hazara-II)
- Habib Ur Rehman Tanoli — Former MNA (Mansehra cum Torghar); former MPA; Provincial Minister for Revenue and Estate
- Haq Nawaz Khan Jahangiri Swati — MPA Mansehra V (3 times), former Minister; Khan of Sachan
- Haroon Khan Badshah (Khankhail Swati) — Former MPA; Provincial Minister; Khan of Sum
- Ibrar Hussain Tanoli — Former Provincial Minister; former MPA
- Khan Abdul Qayyum Khan Jahangiri Swati— First MLA of Hazara (1932 election); MLA Mansehra II (1946 election); Leader of All India National Congress; Khan of Safaida
- Khan Khudadad Khan Jahangiri Swati — Leader of the All India Muslim League Pakistan Movement; MLA Mansehra (1952); First Minister of Health, West Pakistan; Khan of Bhogarmang
- Khan Attai Khan Swati (K.S)— MLA Mansehra II (1937); Leader of Indian National Congress; Khan of Battal
- Khan Haji Faqira Khan Swati — MLA Mansehra III (1937); Leader of Indian National Congress; Khan of Malikpur
- Khan Ali Gohar Khan Swati — MLA Mansehra III (1946); Leader of All India Muslim League; Khan of Gedarpur
- Khan Mohammad Abbas Khankhail Swati — MLA Mansehra-I (1937 & 1946 election); founder of the Hazara Democratic Party; Industries Minister, British India; Khan of Sum
- Laiq Muhammad Khan Swati — Former MNA (Mansehra cum Torghar); current MPA of Torghar District;
- Muhammad Tariq Khan Swati — MPA Mansehra II (three consecutive times; former Minister; Khan of Mansehra City
- Mufti Kifayatullah Khan Swati — Former MNA (Mansehra cum Torghar)
- Naeem Sakhi Tanoli — Former MPA, Tanawal
- Nawabzada Farid Salahuddin Tanoli — Former MNA, Tanawal
- Saleh Muhammad Khan Swati — Former Member of the National Assembly
- Munir Khan Lughmani Swati — MPA Balakot Tehsil; Senior Lawyer
- Shahzada Muhammad Gushtasap Khankhail Swati — MNA Mansehra cum Torghar, former Minister; Khan of Sum
- Khan Raza Muhammad Khan Awan -former senator of Pakistan people's party
- Sardar Muhammad Yousuf Gujjar, MNA; Minister
- Shahjahan Yousuf Gujjar, MPA
- Wajhi Uz Zaman Khan Swati - Former MPA (4 times); Minister of Health; Chief/Khan of Agror
- Zahoor Ahmad, MPA

== Sports ==
- Abrar Ahmed Swati — Pakistani cricketer
- Haris Rauf Swati — Pakistani cricketer

== Media, arts, and literature ==
- Jamal J. Elias
- Maliha Ali Asghar Khan
- Reham Khan Swati — Journalist and former BBC correspondent
- Sagar Sarhadi — Indian writer, film producer, and director
- Yasmeen Yas — Poet

== Religious Figures ==
- Muhammad Sarfaraz Khan Safdar Swati(1914–2009)— Famous Hindustani Deoband Ulema
- Maulana Sufi Abdul Hameed Khan Swati(1917–2008) —Islamic scholar, writer, Imam, lecturer and founder of Jamia Nusrat Ul Uloom Gujranwala
- Mufti Kifayat Ullah Swati — Famous religious Scholar & Politician.
- Muhammad Muneeb-ur-Rehman – Chairman of Ruet-e-hilal committee, Pakistan
- Ghulam Ghaus Hazarvi Swati — Ex-MNA and well known Islamic Scholar and religious leader.
- Qari Fayyaz-ur-Rehman Alvi
- Zahid Ur Rashdi Khan Swati — Islamic Scholar

== Others ==
- Chaudhry Aslam Khan (Tamgha-e-Imtiaz) — Senior Superintendent of Police
- Abdul Karim Saeed Pasha
- Ahmed Hussain Shah
- Ghulam Ur Rehman
- Mian Zia ur Rehman
- Muhammad Safdar Awan
- Muhammad Sajjad Awan
