= List of Hazarewals =

List of notable Hazarewal people

The following is a list of notable Hazarewals (members of the Hindko, Gojri, Kohistani and Pashto speaking mix ethnolinguistic group), who have origins in the Hazara region of Pakistan:

== Actors ==
- Afzal Khan Rambo

== Artists ==
- Jasleen Dhamija

== Authors ==
- Qateel Shifai, Urdu poet
- Daud Kamal
- Sagar Sarhadi (Indian Writer)

== Judiciary ==
- Bashir Jehangiri Swati, former Chief Justice of the Supreme Court of Pakistan
- Ejaz Khan Arghushal Swati, current Chief Justice of the Baluchistan High Court
- Abdul Hakeem Khan Lughmani Swati, former Governor of Khyber Pakhtunkhwa and Former Chief Justice of the Peshawar High Court
- Muhammad Raza Khan Swati, former Chief Justice of the Peshawar High Court
- Ejaz Afzal Khankhail Swati, former Chief Justice of the Peshawar High Court and acting Chief Justice of Supreme Court of Pakistan
- Tariq Mehmood Jahangiri Swati, justice of Islamabad High Court

== Journalist ==
- Reham Khan Swati, BBC journalist

== Military ==
- Anwar Shamim, Chief of Air Staff, Pakistan Air Force
- Zahirul Islam Abbasi (Pakistan Army Major General)
- Noman Bashir, Chief of Naval Staff
- Prem Nath Hoon, retired Indian Army general
- Muhammad Ayub Khan, Field Marshal of Pakistan

== Music ==
- Ali Azmat

== Politicians ==
- Babar Naseem Khan "chief of Swaties" Khan of Garhi Habib Ullah Khan (District Mansehra),Nillishang (District Battagram) and Ex Provincial Minister KPK.
- Shehzada Muhammad Gushtasab Khan MNA NA -15 & X Minster of interior KPK ,health , Food
- Khan Khudadad Khan Swati, notable figure in Pakistan Independence Movement, member of All India Muslim league, 1st Minister of Health West Pakistan and ex-Royal Chief of Siran Valley
- Prince Muhammad Nawaz Khan Swati, MNA of Battagram, current royal "Chief Of Allai Valley"
- Sardar Haider Zaman Khan, leader of the Hazara province movement, former Nazim (counselor) of Abbottabad District, and former Provincial Minister in NWFP Assembly
- Ghulam Ghaus Hazarvi Swati, ex-MNA of Hazara II, Islamic scholar and religious leader
- Asghar Khan, Pakistani Air Force commander, later politician
- Nawabzada Salahuddin Saeed Khan Tanoli, Nawab of Amb (princely state), Chief of Tanawal, ex-Member National Assembly of Pakistan
- Bashir Khan Jehangiri Swati, 17th Chief Justice of the Pakistan Supreme Court
- Azam Khan Swati, government minister, senator and businessman
- Iqbal Khan Jadoon, politician, Chief Minister NWFP
- Khan Mohammad Abbas Khan Swati, MLA(1937) of Indian National Congress from Mansehra & government minister
- Amanullah Khan Jadoon, government minister
- Sardar Muhammad Yaqoob, former member of the National Assembly from Abbottabad and 16th Deputy Speaker of the National Assembly of Pakistan
- Nawab-Zada Wali Muhammad Khan Swati, MPA of Battagram
- Waji Uz Zaman Khan Swati, ex-MPA, current royal Chief of Agror Valley Mansehra
- Sardar Muhammad Aslam Khan, former senator and president of the Pakistan Peoples Party; three-time president of the District Bar Association Abbottabad
- Haji Muhammad Yousaf Khan Swati, former minister, 7 times elected MPA from Battagram
- Sardar Muhammad Idrees, member of the Provincial Assembly of Khyber Pakhtunkhwa from 2002 to 2007 and 2013 to 2018
- Sardar Aurangzeb, 3 time member of the Provincial Assembly of Khyber Pakhtunkhwa
- Sardar Mohammad Abdul Ghafoor Hazarvi, companion of Muhammad Ali Jinnah, founding member and first president of Jamiat Ulema-e-Pakistan as well as the first recipient of Nishan-e-Imtiaz
- Gohar Ayub Khan, politician
- Murtaza Javed Abbasi FMR Deputy Speaker National Assembly of Pakistan
- Mufti Kifayat Ullah Swati, ex-MNA of Mansehra III
- Sardar Raza Khan, Chief Election Commissioner Pakistan, Chief justice Peshawar High Court
- Abdul Jamil Khan
- Abdul Hakeem Khan Swati, ex-Governor of Khyber Pakhtoon Khwa
- Salahuddin Tirmizi, former Corps Commander
- Haroon Khan Badshah, ex-minister of Khyber Pakhtoon Khwa & Khan of Sum
- Mushtaq Ghani, Governor And Speaker KPK
- Ali Khan Jadoon, MNA from Abbottabad
- Saleh Muhammad Khan Swati, ex-MNA of Mansehra
- Babar Saleem Khan Swati, speaker KPK Assembly, MPA of Mansehra City
- Ayub Khan, 2nd President of Pakistan
- Mehtab Abbasi
- Omar Ayub Khan, politician
- Laiq Muhammad Khan Swati, ex-MNA of Mansehra cum Torghar, ex- MPA of Torghar
- Salman Bashir
- Munir Khan Lughmani Swati, MPA Tehsil Balakot, advocate
- Prince Zubair Khan Swati, MPA Tehsil Battagram
- Ajaz Khan Swati, MPA Karachi V
- Faheem Khan Swati, MNA Karachi III
- Sardar Muhammad Yousuf Gujjar former federal Minister of Religious Affairs

== Religious figures ==
- Muhammad Sarfaraz Khan Safdar Swati (1914–2009), Hindustani Deoband Ulema
- Maulana Sufi Abdul Hameed Khan Swati (1917–2008), Islamic scholar, writer, Imam, lecturer and founder of Jamia Nusrat Ul Uloom Gujranwala
- Sardar Mohammad Abdul Ghafoor Hazarvi, founding member of the religious Jamiat Ulema-e-Pakistan party (JUP) and companion of Muhammad Ali Jinnah
- Mufti Kifayat Ullah Swati, religious scholar and politician
- Jawad Naqvi, Islamic scholar, philosopher, religious leader and Qur'an interpreter
- Muhammad Muneeb-ur-Rehman, chairman of Ruet-e-hilal committee, Pakistan
- Ghulam Ghaus Hazarvi Swati, ex-MNA and Islamic scholar and religious leader

== Revolutionaries and freedom fighters ==
- Jalal Baba, prominent leader of All India Muslim League
- Khan Mohammad Abbas Khan, prominent Leader of All India National Congress
- Khan Khudadad Khan Swati, introduced All-India Muslim League in Hazara, fighter of Pakistan Independence Movement, member of All India Muslim league, former Minister of Health West Pakistan and ex-Chief of Siran Valley
- Sardār Bostan Khan Tareen, Pashtun warrior against the Sikh Khalsa and British administration

== Royalty ==
- Babar Naseem Khan "Chief of Swaties",Khan of Garhi Habib Ullah Khan (district Mansehra),Nillishang (district Battagram) and Ex Provincial Minister kpk.
- Nawab Salahuddin Saeed Khan Tanoli, last "Nawab of Amb State" and elected five times MNA.
- Khan Wajhi Uz Zaman Khan Swati, current royal "Chief of Agror Valley", Mansehra
- Khan Khudadad Khan Swati, former "Chief of Siran Valley", Mansehra
- Prince Muhammad Nawaz Khan Swati, current royal "Khan of Allai Valley", current MNA of Battagram.
- Haji Muhammad Yousaf Khan Swati, 7 times elected MPA from Battagram, current royal "Khan of Trand"

== Scientists and academics ==
- Mohammed Naseer Khan, Pakistani physicist
- Omar Asghar Khan, founder of Qaumi Jamhoori Party and ex Minister of Environment
- Abdul Jamil Khan Arghushal Swati (SI), former federal Minister for Population and Welfare, ex- DG Health Pakistan, founding principal Ayub Medical College and Frontier Medical College, ex-president Pakistan Medical Dental Council, Sitara e Imtiaz

== Sportspersons ==
=== Cricket ===
- Yasir Hameed
- Abrar Ahmed Swati
- Haris Rauf
- Sana Mir, captain of Pakistan women's national team

=== Football ===
- Qayyum Changezi
- Younus Changezi
- Rajab Ali
- Muhammad Ali Shah
