= NA-15 Mansehra-cum-Torghar =

Constituency of the National Assembly of Pakistan

- Constituency for the National Assembly of Pakistan
- Region: Oghi Tehsil, Darband Tehsil, Tanawal Tehsil, Baffa Pakhal Tehsil (partly) and Mansehra Tehsil (partly) of Mansehra District; Torghar District
- Electorate: 645,049

Current constituency
- Party: Sunni Ittehad Council
- Member: Shahzada Muhammad Gushtasap Khan
- Created from: NA-14 Mansehra-II

NA-15 Mansehra-cum-Torghar (این اے-15، مانسہرہ-کم-تورغر) is a constituency for the National Assembly of Pakistan. It covers part of the district of Mansehra and the entire district of Torghar. The constituency was formerly known as NA-21 (Mansehra-II) from 1977 to 2018 which covered the same area, Torghar being part of Mansehra district until 2011. The name changed to NA-14 (Mansehra-cum-Torghar) after the delimitation in 2018.

== Members of Parliament ==
=== 1970–2002: Mansehra-II ===
| Election | Member | Party |
|---|---|---|
| 1970 | Ghulam Ghaus Hazarvi Swati | JUI |

| Election | Member | Party |
|---|---|---|
| 1977 | Fakhar Uz Zaman Khan Swati (Chief of Agror) | PNA |
| 1985 | Nawabzada Salahuddin Saeed | Independent |
| 1988 | Nawabzada Salahuddin Saeed | Independent |

| Election | Member | Party |
|---|---|---|
| 1990 | Nawabzada Salahuddin Saeed | IJI |
| 1993 | Nawabzada Salahuddin Saeed | PML-N |
| 1997 | Nawabzada Salahuddin Saeed | PML-N |

=== 2002–2018: NA-21 Mansehra-II ===
| Election | Member | Party |
|---|---|---|
| 2002 | Maulana Abdul Malik | MMA |
| 2008 | Laiq Muhammad Khan Swati | MMA |
| 2013 | Muhammad Safdar Awan | PML (N) |

=== 2018–2022: NA-14 Mansehra-cum-Torghar ===
| Election | Member | Party |
|---|---|---|
| 2018 | Muhammad Sajjad Awan | PML (N) |

=== 2024–present: NA-15 Mansehra-cum-Torghar ===
| Election | Member | Party |
|---|---|---|
| 2024 | Shahzada Muhammad Gushtasap Khan | SIC |

== Detailed results ==
=== 2002 general election ===
2002 General Election: NA-21 (Mansehra-II)
| Party | Candidate | Votes | % | ±% |
|---|---|---|---|---|
| MMA | Maulana Abdul Malik | 46,311 | 44.62 | |
| Independent | Faiz Muhammad Khan | 25,771 | 24.83 | |
| PML-Q | Nawabzada Salahuddin Saeed | 24,557 | 23.66 | |
| PML-N | Tahir Ali | 7,158 | 6.89 | |
| Majority | | 20,540 | 19.79 | |
| Turnout | | 103,797 | 34.04 | |
| MMA gain from PML (N) | | | | |

A total of 1,836 votes were rejected.

=== 2008 general election ===
2008 General Election: NA-21 (Mansehra-II)
| Party | Candidate | Votes | % | ±% |
|---|---|---|---|---|
| MMA | Laiq Muhammad Khan | 36,629 | 26.56 | −18.06 |
| PML-Q | Zar Gul Khan | 31,774 | 23.03 | |
| PML-N | Tahir Ali | 29,911 | 21.68 | +14.79 |
| PPPP | Nawabzada Sala-ud-din Saeed | 28,234 | 20.47 | |
| Independent | Professor Dr Ali Asghar Shah | 4,500 | 3.26 | |
| Independent | Niaz Muhammad Khan | 3,482 | 2.53 | |
| Independent | Maulana Rabnawaz Tahir | 1,977 | 1.43 | |
| Independent | Baram Khan | 635 | 0.46 | |
| Independent | Amjad Salar Khan | 555 | 0.40 | |
| Independent | Muhammad Miskeen | 251 | 0.18 | |
| Majority | | 4,855 | 3.53 | |
| Turnout | | 137,948 | | |
| MMA hold | | Swing | | |

=== 2013 general election ===
2013 General Election: NA-21 (Mansehra-II)
| Party | Candidate | Votes | % | ±% |
|---|---|---|---|---|
| PML-N | Captain R Muhammad Safdar | 91,013 | 52.75 | +31.07 |
| JUI-F | Laiq Muhammad Khan | 43,342 | 25.12 | |
| PTI | Nawabzada Salahuddin Saeed | 25,615 | 14.85 | |
| Independent | Maulana Rabnawaz Tahir | 4,832 | 2.80 | +1.37 |
| JI | Maulana Abdul Malik | 3,219 | 1.87 | |
| Independent | Shoukat Ali Khan | 2,152 | 1.25 | |
| Independent | Dr Muhammad Azam | 1,040 | 0.60 | |
| Independent | Lady Doctor Shaheen Zameer | 814 | 0.47 | |
| MQM | Muhammad Yaqoob | 510 | 0.29 | |
| Majority | | 47,671 | 27.63 | |
| Turnout | | 172,537 | 45.13 | |
| PML (N) gain from MMA | | | | |

A total of 5,660 votes were rejected.

=== 2018 general election ===
General elections were held on 25 July 2018.

General election 2018: NA-14 (Mansehra-cum-Torghar)
| Party | Candidate | Votes | % | ±% |
|---|---|---|---|---|
| PML(N) | Muhammad Sajjad Awan | 74,889 | 35.32 | ▼17.43 |
| PTI | Zar Gul Khan | 59,638 | 28.13 | ▲13.28 |
| MMA | Kifayatullah | 45,449 | 21.44 | ▼5.55^{†} |
| Others | Others (seven candidates) | 24,000 | 11.32 | |
| Turnout | | 212,009 | 41.49 | ▼3.64 |
| Rejected ballots | | 8,033 | 3.79 | |
| Majority | | 15,251 | 7.19 | |
| Registered electors | | 510,931 | | |
| PML(N) hold | | Swing | N/A | |

^{†}JI and JUI-F contested as part of MMA

=== 2024 general election ===
General elections were held on 8 February 2024. Shahzada Muhammad Gushtasap Khan won the election with 105,259 votes.

General election 2024: NA-15 Mansehra-cum-Torghar
| Party | Candidate | Votes | % | ±% |
|---|---|---|---|---|
| PTI | Shahzada Muhammad Gushtasap Khan (Note: Filed nomination papers as PTI candidate but ECP allowed him to run as an Independent) | 105,259 | 44.12 | ▲15.99 |
| PML(N) | Nawaz Sharif | 80,413 | 33.71 | ▼1.61 |
| JUI (F) | Mufti Kifayatullah | 29,938 | 12.55 | N/A |
| PPP | Zar Gul Khan | 5,443 | 2.28 | |
| TLP | Tahir Riaz | 4,423 | 1.85 | ▼1.22 |
| JI | Muhammad Khalid | 4,125 | 1.73 | |
| Others | Others (nine candidates) | 6,955 | 2.92 | |
| Turnout | | 246,760 | 38.41 | ▼3.08 |
| Total valid votes | | 238,656 | 96.72 | |
| Rejected ballots | | 9,104 | 3.28 | |
| Majority | | 24,846 | 10.41 | |
| Registered electors | | 645,049 | | |

== See also ==
- NA-14 Mansehra
- NA-16 Abbottabad-I
