= Jahangiri (surname) =

Jahangiri is a surname. Notable people with the surname include:

- Babar Saleem Jahangiri Swati, Speaker of Khyber Pakhtunkhwa Assembly, Pakistan
- Bashir Jahangiri Swati (born 1937), 17th Chief Justice of Pakistan
- Eshaq Jahangiri (born 1958), 6th First Vice President of Iran
- Khan Khudadad Khan Jahangiri Swati, 1st Health Minister of Pakistan
- Marjan Jahangiri (born 1962), British professor of cardiac surgery
- Nader Jahangiri (born 1945), Iranian linguist
- Reza Jahangiri (born 1978), American businessman
- Sultan Awais Jahangiri (born 1490), last king of the Sultanate of Swat
- Tariq Mehmood Jahangiri Swati, Pakistani jurist
