= NA-14 Mansehra =

Constituency of the National Assembly of Pakistan

- Constituency for the National Assembly of Pakistan
- Region: Balakot Tehsil, Mansehra Tehsil (partly), and Baffa Pakhal Tehsil (partly) of Mansehra District
- Electorate: 582,844

Current constituency
- Party: Pakistan Muslim League (N)
- Member: Sardar Muhammad Yousuf
- Created from: NA-14 Mansehra-I

NA-14 Mansehra (این اے-14، مانسہرہ) is a constituency for the National Assembly of Pakistan. The constituency was formerly known as NA-20 (Mansehra-I) from 1977 to 2018. The name changed to NA-13 (Mansehra-I) after the delimitation in 2018 and to NA-14 Mansehra after the delimitation in 2023.

== Members of Parliament ==
=== 1937–1945: Indian elections ===
Election	Constituency	Member	Party
1937	Mansehra- I	Khan Sahib Atai Khan Swati	Indian National Congress
1937	Mansehra- II	Khan Muhammad Abbas Khan Swati	Indian National Congress
1937	Mansehra- III	Khan Haji Faqeera Khan Swati	Indian National Congress

=== 1977–2024: Mansehra-I ===
Election	Member	Party
1977	Muhammad Hanif Khan Swati	PPP
1985	Syed Qasim Shah	Independent
1988	Syed Qasim Shah	Independent
1990	Sardar Muhammad Yousaf	Independent
1993	Sardar Muhammad Yousaf	PML-N
1997	Sardar Muhammad Yousaf	PML-N

Election	Member	Party
2002	Sardar Shahjahan Yousuf	PML (Q)
2008	Sardar Shahjahan Yousuf	PML (Q)
2013	Sardar Muhammad Yousuf	PML (N)

Election	Member	Party
2018	Saleh Muhammad Khan	PTI

== Elections since 2002 ==
=== 2002 general election ===
2002 General Election: NA-20 (Mansehra-I)
Party	Candidate	Votes	%	±%
PML-Q	Sardar Shah Jehan Yousuf	40,853	34.80	
Independent	Lt General Syed Salahuddin Tirmizi	37,520	31.96	
MMA	Al-Haj Syed Ghulam Nabi Shah	35,576	30.30	
PML-N	Muhammad Saqib Murntaz	1,754	1.49	
PPPP	Sardar Wilqarul Mulk	1,442	1.23	
MQM	Naveed Akhter Khan	250	0.22	
Majority		3,333	2.84	
Turnout		117,395	36.89	
PML(Q) gain from PML(N)				

A total of 3,379 votes were rejected.

=== 2008 general election ===
2008 General Election: NA-20 (Mansehra-I)
Party	Candidate	Votes	%	±%
PML	Sardar Shajehan Yousaf	73,644	47.48	
PML-N	Lt General Salah-ud-Din Trimzi	72,526	46.75	+45.26
PPPP	Ghayas-ud-din Khan	8,114	5.23	+4.00
MQM	Naveed Akhter Khan	830	0.54	
Majority		1,118	0.73	
Turnout		155,114	36.02	−0.87
PML gain from PML (Q)				

A total of 3,669 votes were rejected.

=== 2013 general election ===
2013 General Election: NA-20 (Mansehra-I)
Party	Candidate	Votes	%	±%
PML-N	Sardar Muhammad Yousuf	106,467	48.14	+1.39
PTI	Azam Swati	75,197	34.00	
JUI-F	Syed Qasim Shah	29,001	13.11	
JI	Muhammad Younis Khattak	3,321	1.50	
Independent	Muhammad Fayaz	1,971	0.89	
Independent	Samar Ul Islam	1,862	0.84	
Independent	Muhammad Irfan	643	0.29	
Tehreek-e-Suba Hazara	Fakhar E Alam urf Hazrat	630	0.28	
Independent	Wali Ur Rehman Chichi	613	0.28	
PML-H	Naveed Akhtar Khan	472	0.22	
Independent	Ijaz Hussain Shazal	415	0.19	
MQM	Ghulam Nabi	274	0.13	−0.41
PPP (SB)	Sheikh Kamran Iqbal	286	0.13	
Majority		31,270	14.14	
Turnout		221,152	54.60	+18.58
PML (N) gain from PML				

A total of 8,452 votes were rejected.

=== 2018 general election ===
General elections were held on 25 July 2018.

General election 2018: NA-13 (Mansehra-I)
Party	Candidate	Votes	%	±%
Independent	Saleh Muhammad Khan	109,282	41.85	▲41.85
PML(N)	Shahjahan Yousuf	107,808	41.28	▼6.86
MMA	Muhammad Baseer Awan	19,716	7.55	▼7.06^{†}
Others	Others (eleven candidates)	16,748	6.41	
Turnout		261,154	49.56	▼5.04
Rejected ballots		7,600	2.91	
Majority		1,474	0.57	
Registered electors		526,974		
Independent gain from PML(N)				

^{†}JI and JUI-F contested as part of MMA

=== 2024 general election ===
General elections were held on 8 February 2024. Sardar Muhammad Yousuf won the election with 115,642 votes.

General election 2024: NA-14 Mansehra
Party	Candidate	Votes	%	±%
PML(N)	Sardar Muhammad Yousuf	115,642	45.51	▲4.23
PTI	Muhammad Saleem Imran (Note: Filed nomination papers as PTI candidate but ECP allowed him to run as an Independent)	103,388	40.69	N/A
PPP	Muhammad Shuja Khan	13,810	5.43	N/A
Others	Others (five candidates)	21,271	8.37	
Turnout		260,955	44.77	▼4.79
Rejected ballots		6,844	2.62	
Majority		12,254	4.82	
Registered electors		582,844		
PML(N) gain from PTI				

== See also ==
- NA-13 Battagram
- NA-15 Mansehra-cum-Torghar
