= Hazara region =

Region in northern Pakistan

Coordinates: 34°50′N 73°14′E

Military map of the Hazara region, surveyed by D. G. Robinson in 1848–49

Hazara (Hindko: هزاره; Urdu: ہزارہ), large parts of which were known as Pakhli Sarkar, is a region in northern Pakistan. It forms the northernmost portion of Sindh Sagar Doab, and is mainly populated by the indigenous Hindko-speaking Hindkowans, known as the Hazarewal. The Hazara region encompasses the former Hazara District, consisting principally of present-day Abbottabad, Haripur and Mansehra districts. Historically, adjoining territories including Kohistan, Allai and the Black Mountain (present-day Torghar) lay beyond the region's boundaries; these territories were subsequently incorporated later to form the modern administrative Hazara Division.

== Etymology ==
The origin of the name Hazara has been identified with Abisāra, the country of Abisares, the monarch of the region at the time of Alexander's invasion. The British archaeologist Aurel Stein regards it as derived from the Sanskrit name Urasā, or 'Urasha'. However, the region only came to be known as Hazara after Timur held control of it in 1399, and assigned it to his local chieftains, namely the Hazara-i-Karlugh.

== History ==
=== Ancient period ===
Alexander the Great, after conquering parts of northern Punjab, established his rule over a large part of Hazara. The region of Amb and its surrounding areas have been associated with Embolina mentioned by Arrian and Ptolemy's Geography near Aornos, the town chosen to serve as Alexander's base of supplies. According to Arrian, the ruler of the region in Alexander's time was called Arsakes.

With the rise of Chandragupta Maurya, the region came under the complete control of the Mauryan Empire. Ashoka governed this area as a prince, imperial throne c. 272 BCE. He made it one of the major seats of his government. The Mansehra Rock Edicts, inscribed on three large boulders near Mansehra record fourteen of Ashoka's edicts, presenting aspects of the emperor's dharma or righteous law. These represent some of the earliest evidence of deciphered writing in the subcontinent, dating to the middle of the third century BCE, and are written from right to left in the Kharosthi script.

The region was briefly and nominally controlled by many rulers foreign rulers, including the Indo-Parthians, Indo-Scythians, and Kushans, who promoted Buddhism throughout Central and South Asia. The region reached its height under the Buddhist ruler Kanishka. During the Kushan period, Buddhist art and architecture flourished in the area.

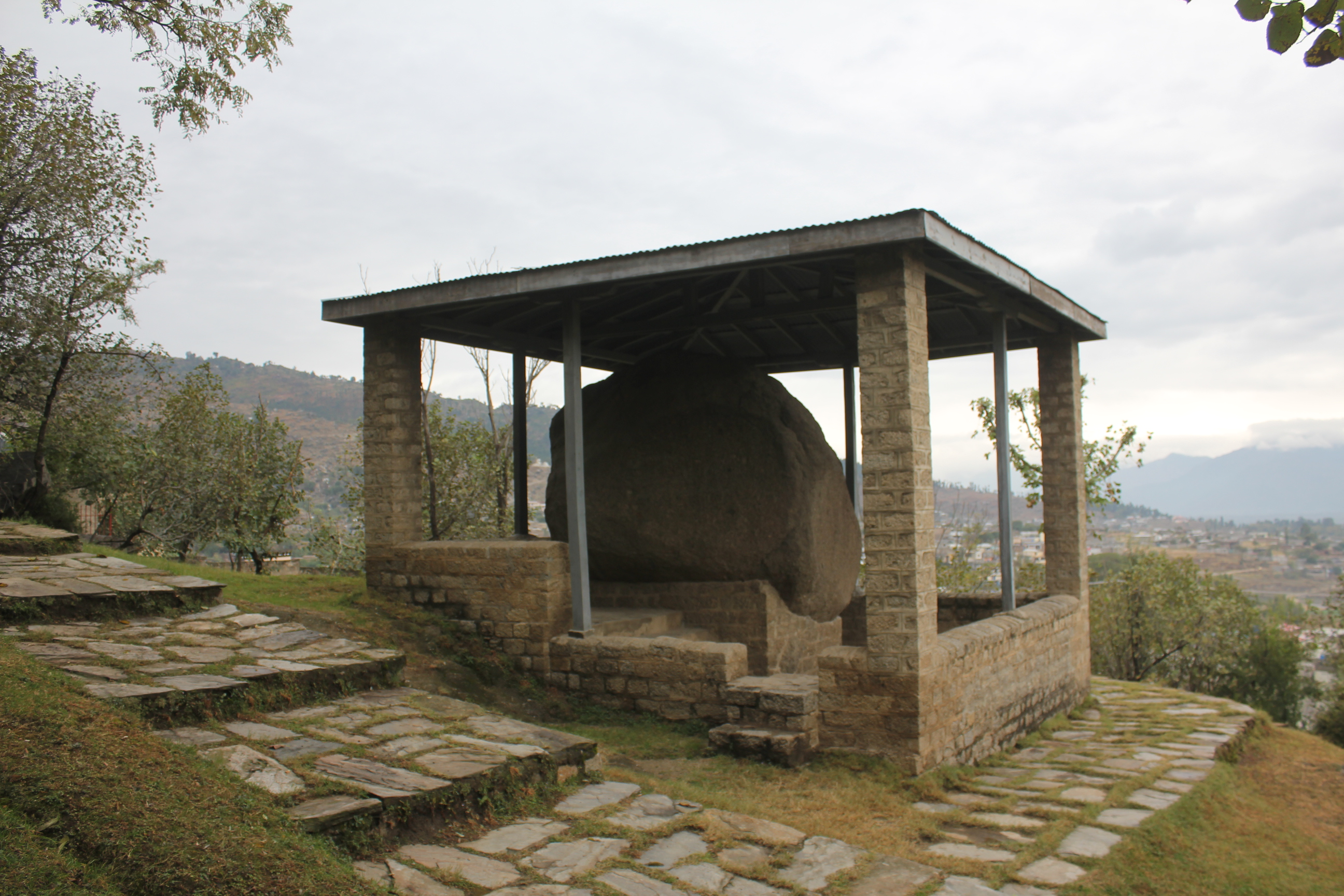
Major Rock Edict of Ashoka in Mansehra.

=== Medieval period ===
When the Chinese pilgrim Hiun-Tsang visited the area in the 7th century, it was under the control of Durlabhavardhana, the ruler of the Karkota dynasty. He mentioned the region as Wu-la-shi.

The Turk Shahi and Hindu Shahi dynasties ruled Hazara one after another. Mahmud of Ghazni defeated the Hindu Shahi ruler Jayapala during his first campaign. However, there is no significant historical evidence attesting the Ghaznavid rule in Hazara. After the fall of the Hindu Shahi dynasty in the 11th century, the rulers of Kashmir took control of the area, the most notable being under the leadership of Kalasa (1063 to 1089) until the area fell to the Ghurids.

In 1399, the Turco-Mongol warrior Timur, on his return to Kabul, stationed his Karluk Turkic soldiers in Hazara to protect the important route between Kabul and Kashmir.

In Mughal era, the region was part of the Pakhli Pargana (district), which formed a part of the larger Kashmir Sarkar, which in turn was part of the Kabul Subah after 1586. It was elevated to the level of a Sarkar in 1648 when Kashmir became a separate Subah.

At the beginning of the 18th century, Turkic rule came to an end due to the increased aggression of the Swatis. The most crucial attack was that of the Swatis in 1703, in collusion with Syed Jalal BABA,the son-in-law of the last ruler of Pakhli, Sultan Mehmud Khurd. Thus, the leader of Swati (Pashtun tribe)Abdur Rehman Khan Bhai Khan was the Chief of Swatis Tribal Army ousted the Turks and captured this area during the last part of the 16th and beginning of the 17th century.Book Afghan and Pathan by George A Scott

=== Modern period ===
The area became under the Durrani Empire from the mid-18th to the early 19th centuries. The Durranis considered it wise to rule the region through the local tribal chiefs. The Amb area was ruled by Suba Khan Tanoli during the reign of the Durrani Empire. He was appointed as nazim (area administrator or Governor) by Taimur Shah Durrani in 1775 or 1776. Suba Khan Tanoli died in 1783.

Hazara came under Sikh rule in 1820 when the region was conquered by the Sikh Empire led by the Sikh general Hari Singh Nalwa. The city of Haripur was founded by him in 1822 and became the headquarters of Hazara until 1853. He was also appointed by Ranjit Singh as the second Nazim of Hazara after the first Nazim Amar Singh Majithia was killed by the local populace at Samundar Katha in Abbottabad.

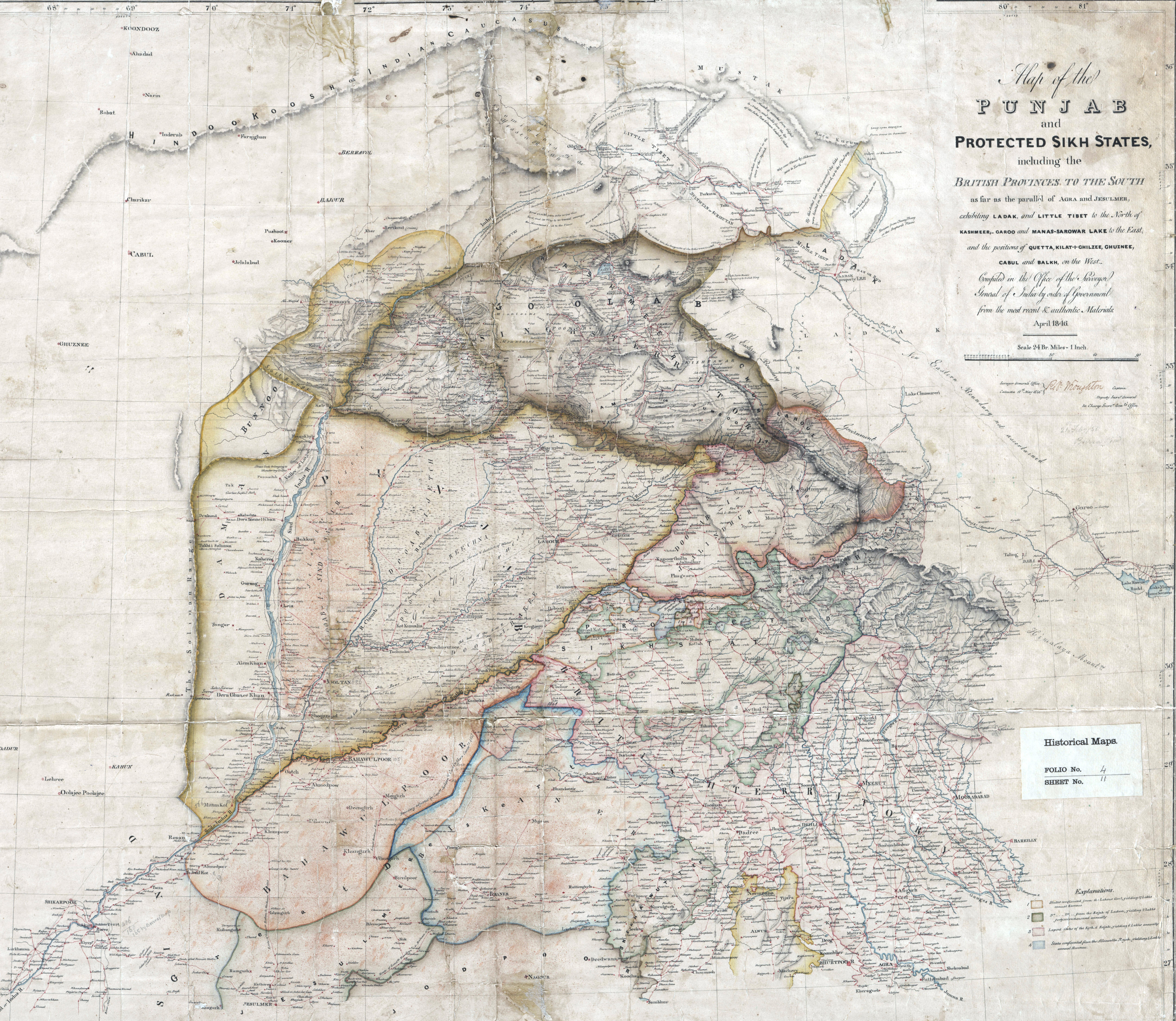
1846 showing the territory of Gulab Singh, including Hazara & Punjab (Lahore Durbar)

After the First Anglo-Sikh War, under the terms of the Treaty of Lahore & Later Treaty of Amritsar march 1846 Kashmir and its dependencies—including the hilly region of Hazara—were Sold to Gulab Singh in return for a payment of 75 lakh rupees. The treaty described the transferred territory as “all the hilly or mountainous country, with its dependencies, situated eastward of the River Indus and westward of the River Ravi.” Gulab Singh sent Diwan Hari Chand to collect revenue in Hazara, but faced widespread resistance from local chiefs and communities. By November 1846, British-supported forces had to march into Upper Hazara to suppress unrest. On 6 January 1847, after continued instability, Gulab Singh formally returned Hazara to the British-infulance (after First Anglo-Sikh War) Lahore durbar in exchange for territory near Jammu. Major James Abbott was appointed to assess and administer Hazara, and by 31 January 1848 he reported the district to be fully pacified and under British control. Abbott managed to secure and pacify the area within a year. During the Second Sikh War Abbott and his men were cut off by the Sikh army from supplies and reinforcements from the rest of the British Army, but were able to maintain their position.

By 1849, the British had gained control of all of Hazara. However, the local tribes were occasionally rebellious, including the Swatis and the Tor Ghar tribes. The British sent many expeditions against these tribes to crush several uprisings between 1852 and the 1920s, including the Hazara Expedition of 1888.

From the early 1930s onwards, the people of Hazara gradually became active in the freedom movement for an independent Pakistan under the active leadership of renowned All India Muslim League leaders such as Abdul Majid Khan Tarin and Jalal Baba. Sometime before the independence of Pakistan in 1947, the Nawab of Amb Muhammad Farid Khan Tanoli also developed good relations with Muhammad Ali Jinnah and Liaqat Ali Khan as a political move.

In this picture seated (left to right): Sahibzada Mohammad Khurshid (first Pakistani Governor of the NWFP), Nawabzada Liaquat Ali Khan (first Prime Minister of Pakistan), Muhammad Farid Khan Tanoli (Nawab of Amb) and Begum Ra'ana Liaquat Ali Khan (wife of Liaquat Ali Khan). Darband, Amb State, 1949.

During British rule, the region of Hazara along with the districts of Peshawar, Kohat, Bannu and Dera Ismail Khan, had formed part of Punjab province, until the western parts of the province were separated to form the new North-West Frontier Province in 1901. The areas around Abbottabad and Mansehra became the Hazara District of Peshawar Division, whilst areas to the north of this became the Hazara Tribal Agency. Sandwiched between the agency and the district were the small princely states of Amb and Phulra. This system of administration continued until 1950, when these two small states were incorporated into the Hazara district.

From 1955 to 1970, NWFP province became part of West Pakistan under the One Unit policy, with the Hazara district forming part of the Peshawar Division of West Pakistan.

== Geography and climate ==
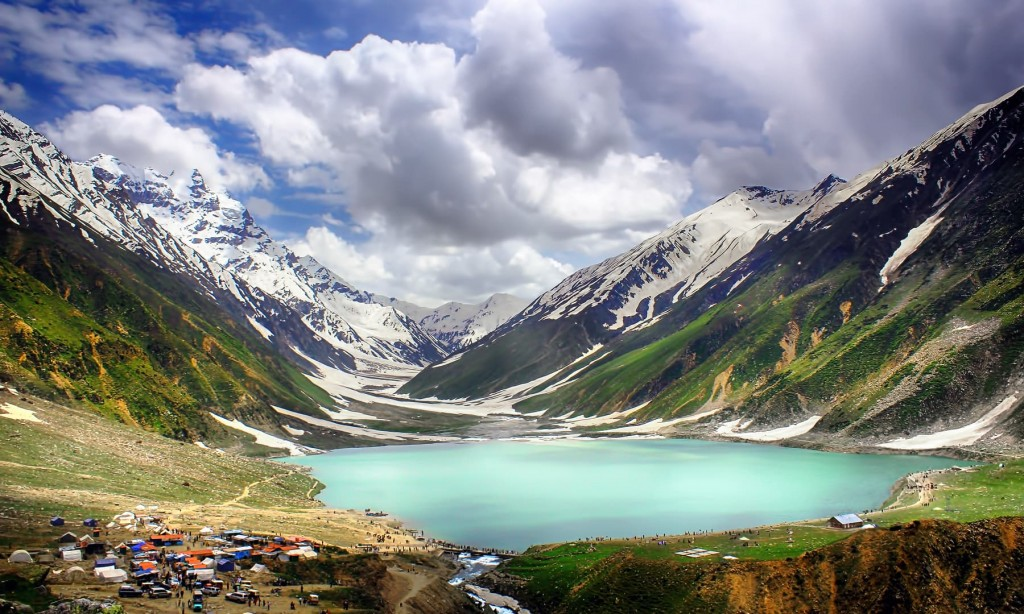
Lake Saiful Muluk, located in the Kaghan Valley, near the town of Naran in the Saiful Muluk National Park.

Hazara is bounded by the Islamabad Capital Territory and the province of Punjab to the south, Azad Kashmir to the east, Gilgit-Baltistan to the north, whilst to the west lies the rest of the province of Khyber Pakhtunkhwa. The river Indus runs through the division in a north–south line, forming much of the western border of the division. The total area of Hazara is 18,013 km^{2}.

Because it lies immediately south of the main Himalayan range, and is exposed to moist winds from the Arabian Sea, Hazara is the wettest part of Pakistan. At Abbottabad, annual rainfall averages around 1,200 millimetres (47 in) but has been as high as 1,800 millimetres (71 in), whilst in parts of Mansehra District such as Balakot the mean annual rainfall is as high as 1,750 millimetres (69 in). Due to its location on the boundary between the monsoonal summer rainfall regime of East Asia and the winter-dominant Mediterranean climate of West Asia, Hazara has an unusual bimodal rainfall regime, with one peak in February or March associated with frontal southwest cloud bands and another monsoonal peak in July and August. The driest months are October to December, though in the wettest parts even these months average around 40 millimetres (1.6 in).

Due to the high altitude, temperatures in Hazara are cooler than on the plains, though Abbottabad at 1,200 metres (3,900 ft) still has maxima around 32 °C (90 °F) with high humidity in June and July. Further up, temperatures are cooler, often cooler than the Northern Areas valleys due to the cloudiness. In winter, temperatures are cold, with minima in January around 0 °C (32 °F) and much lower in the high mountains.

Hazara accounts for a high level of Pakistan's tourism industry. Along the Karakoram Highway are major destinations for tourists including the famous Kaghan Valley, Lulusar Lake, Balakot, Naran, Shogran, Ayubia and Babusar Top. The region is known for its scenery and landscapes, resulting in its popularity as a summertime resort amongst locals and tourists.

=== National parks ===
There are about 29 National Parks in Pakistan and 3 in Hazara.

Name	Photo	Location	Date established	Area (Hec)	Key wildlife
Ayubia National Park		Abbottabad District	1984	3,122	Indian leopard, Leopard cat, Yellow-throated marten, Asian palm civet, Masked palm civet, Rhesus macaque, Red giant flying squirrel, Koklass pheasant and Kalij pheasant
Saiful Muluk National Park		Mansehra District	2003	12,026	Himalayan black bear, Yellow-throated marten, Masked palm civet, Himalayan goral, Himalayan musk deer, Siberian ibex, Himalayan monal and Cheer pheasant
Lulusar-Dudipatsar National Park		Mansehra District	2003	75,058	Persian leopard, Yellow-throated marten, Himalayan black bear, Siberian ibex, Himalayan goral, Himalayan monal and Western tragopan

== Demographics ==
=== Tribes ===
Some major tribes of the Hazara region of Khyber Pakhtunkhwa province of Pakistan are as follows.

- Awans
- Dhund Abbasi
- Gujjar
- Hashmi
- Karlal
- Khokhar
- Mughal
- Pashtun
- Qureshi
- Sayeds
- Shaikh
- Swati
- Tanoli

=== Religion ===
Religious groups in the Hazara region (British North-West Frontier Province era)
Religious group	1881		1891		1901		1911		1921		1931		1941	
Religious group	Pop.	%	Pop.	%	Pop.	%	Pop.	%	Pop.	%	Pop.	%	Pop.	%
Islam	385,759	94.76%	488,453	94.61%	533,120	95.15%	572,972	95.02%	591,058	94.97%	636,794	95.03%	756,004	94.95%
Hinduism	19,843	4.87%	23,983	4.65%	23,031	4.11%	24,389	4.04%	26,038	4.18%	25,260	3.77%	30,267	3.8%
Sikhism	1,381	0.34%	3,609	0.7%	4,036	0.72%	5,489	0.91%	4,850	0.78%	7,630	1.14%	9,220	1.16%
Christianity	90	0.02%	236	0.05%	101	0.02%	178	0.03%	403	0.06%	432	0.06%	737	0.09%
Jainism	0	0%	3	0%	0	0%	0	0%	0	0%	0	0%	0	0%
Zoroastrianism	0	0%	4	0%	0	0%	0	0%	0	0%	1	0%	0	0%
Buddhism	0	0%	0	0%	0	0%	0	0%	0	0%	0	0%	2	0%
Others	2	0%	0	0%	0	0%	0	0%	0	0%	0	0%	0	0%
Total population	407,075	100%	516,288	100%	560,288	100%	603,028	100%	622,349	100%	670,117	100%	796,230	100%
Note: British North-West Frontier Province era figures are for Hazara District, which roughly corresponds to the entire Hazara Region.

== Education ==
Some districts of Hazara have received high scores in education in Alif Ailaan's 2017 rankings: Haripur District was ranked first in Pakistan, while Abbottabad and Mansehra were in the top three for the province of Khyber Pakhtunkhwa.

== Movement for Hazara Province ==
The movement for a separate Hazara province began in 1957, when regional lawyers Mufti Idrees and Abdul Khaliq first raised the question of a separate province, Kohistan. In 1987, Hazara Qaumi Mahaz (HQM) was founded by Muhammad Asif Malik advocate, a prominent advocate who campaigned for the creation of a separate province.

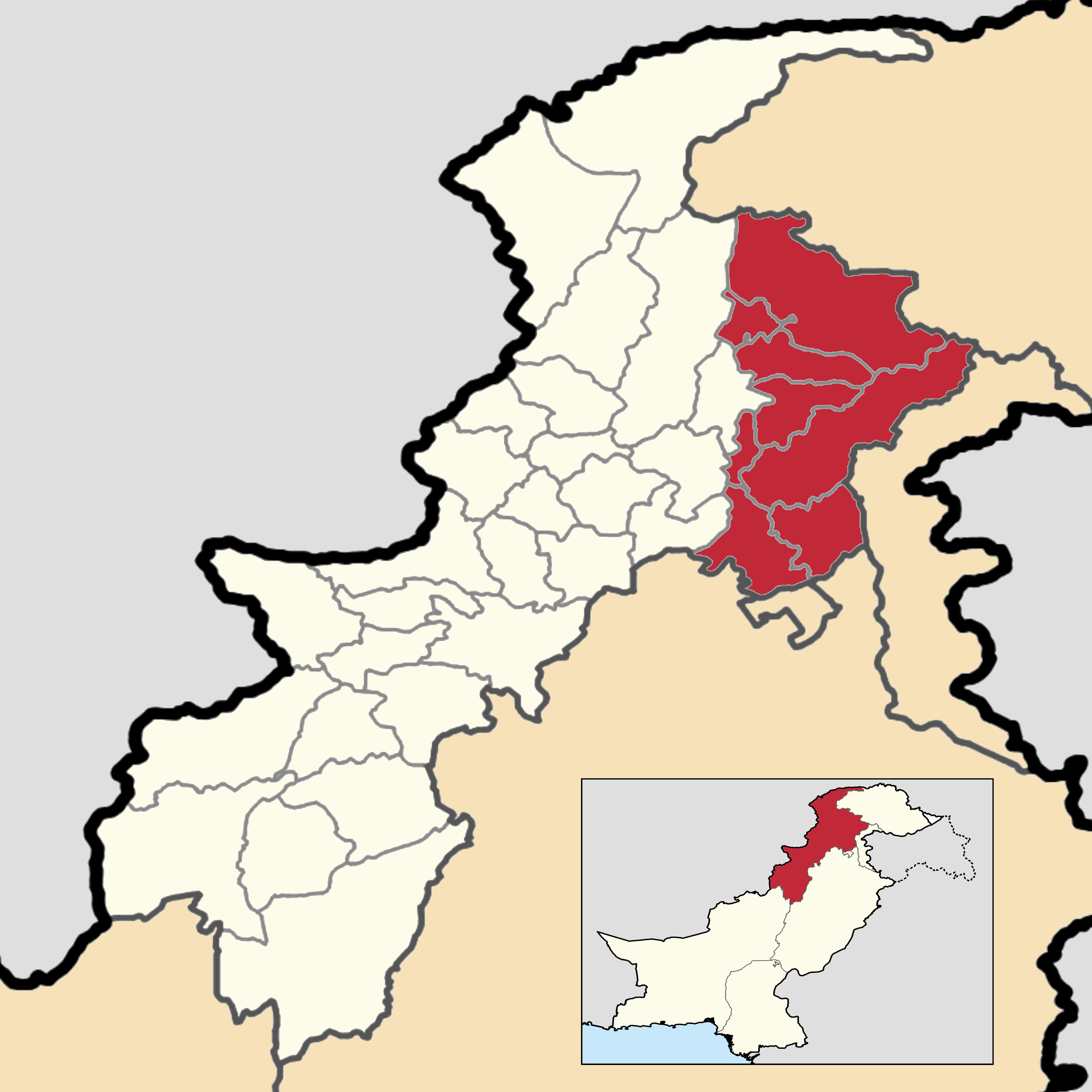
Map of Hazara division, Khyber Pakhtunkwa

The Eighteenth Amendment to the Constitution of Pakistan was passed on the 8th of April 2010, which among other changes, renamed the North-West Frontier Province to Khyber Pakhtunkhwa. The name change of the province was met with strong opposition from the people of Hazara and protests erupted in the region with wheel and shutter jam strikes. Abbottabad became the nerve center of the movement. On the 10th of April, the Khyber Pakhtunkhwa Police fired at unarmed protesters, leaving 7 dead and dozens injured. Allegedly, the firing was ordered by the coalition government of Khyber Pakhtunkhwa, led by the Awami National Party. This is one of the earliest incidents of police brutality in Pakistan in recent years, occurring before the Model Town Lahore incident, whose FIR has not been registered still today.

In 2014, the resolution for the creation of the Hazara Province was adopted by the Khyber Pakhtunkhwa Assembly. The movement slowed down and shrunk to only observing the 12th of April martyrs anniversary, the death of the movement's pioneer, Baba Haider Zaman, in 2018.

In 2020, the movement started again when the government began work for the creation of the Saraiki and Bahawalpur provinces. Hazara's leaders sought to include the creation of the Hazara Province along with it. A bill for the creation of the Hazara province has also been tabled in the Parliament of Pakistan.

In December 2025, the Khyber Pakhtunkhwa Assembly unanimously passed another resolution calling for the creation of Hazara province and urged the federal government to initiate the constitutional process for its establishment.

== Notable people ==
- Baba Sardar Haider Zaman karlal – leader of the movement for a separate Hazara province and former member of National Assembly as well as Provincial Assembly.
- Allama Syed Jawad Naqvi – Islamic revolutionary scholar and religious leader.
- Sardar Muhammad Yousaf Gujjar – former Federal Minister of Ministry of Religious Affairs and Inter-faith Harmony and continuously winning elections from his constituency in Mansehra for nearly 40 years, establishing himself as a long-standing political figure in the region.
- Shahid Khaqan Abbasi – Prime Minister of Pakistan
- Muhammad Riaz Khan Abbasi – Director-General of the Inter-Services Intelligence (ISI) Pakistan
- Nawab Salahuddin Saeed Khan Tanoli – last nawab of Amb State and elected five times MNA.
- Khan Mohammad Abbas Khan – freedom fighter as well as an active member of PML
- Ayub Khan – former President of Pakistan
- Jalal Baba – Federal Minister and prominent leader of All India Muslim League
- Sardar Mehtab Ahmed Khan Abbasi – Governor and Chief Minister Of Khyber Pakhtunkhwa
- Sardar Mohammad Abdul Ghafoor Hazarvi – founding member of the religious Jamiat Ulema-e-Pakistan party (JUP) and companion of Muhammad Ali Jinnah
- Murtaza Javed Abbasi – FMR Deputy Speaker National Assembly of Pakistan
- Muhammad Hanif Abbasi – Member of National Assembly of Pakistan
- Raja Usama Sarwar Abbasi – Member of National Assembly of Pakistan
- Sardar Rajab Ali Khan Abbasi – Member of the Provincial Assembly of Khyber Pakhtunkhwa
- Sadia Khaqan Abbasi – Barrister and Member of the Senate of Pakistan
- Muhammad Muneeb-ur-Rehman – former chairman of Ruet-e-Hilal Committee, Pakistan
- Asghar Khan – Pakistani Air Force commander, politician
- Anwar Shamim – Chief of Air Staff, Pakistani Air Force
- Bashir Jehangiri – Chief Justice of the Supreme Court
- Qateel Shifai – Urdu poet
- Afzal Khan – actor
- Khaqan Abbasi – Pakistan Air Force officer and later Minister
- Javeed Iqbal Abbasi – Member of National Assembly of Pakistan
- Zahirul Islam Abbasi – Brigadier General and Intelligence Officer Pakistan Army
- Salahuddin Tirmizi- former Corps Commander
- Iqbal Khan Jadoon – politician and Chief Minister NWFP
- Amanullah Khan Jadoon – politician and Federal Minister
- Gohar Ayub Khan – politician
- Yasir Hameed – cricketer
- Azam Khan Swati – businessman, politician
- Sardar Raza Khan – Election Commissioner of Pakistan
- Ali Khan Jadoon – politician
- Khan Khudadad Khan Swati — freedom fighter of Pakistan Movement and active member of All India Muslim League and Pakistan Muslim League
- Babar Saleem Khan Swati — Speaker Khyber Pakhtunkhwa Assembly
- Laiq Muhammad Khan Swati — politician
- Munir Lughmani Swati — politician and advocate Supreme Court of Pakistan
- Prince Nawaz Khan Swati — politician
