= Habib Ur Rehman Tanoli =

Pakistani politician (1945–2025)

Mohsin-e-Tanawal Habib Ur Rehman Tanoli
- حاجی حبیب الرحمان تنولی (محسن تناول)
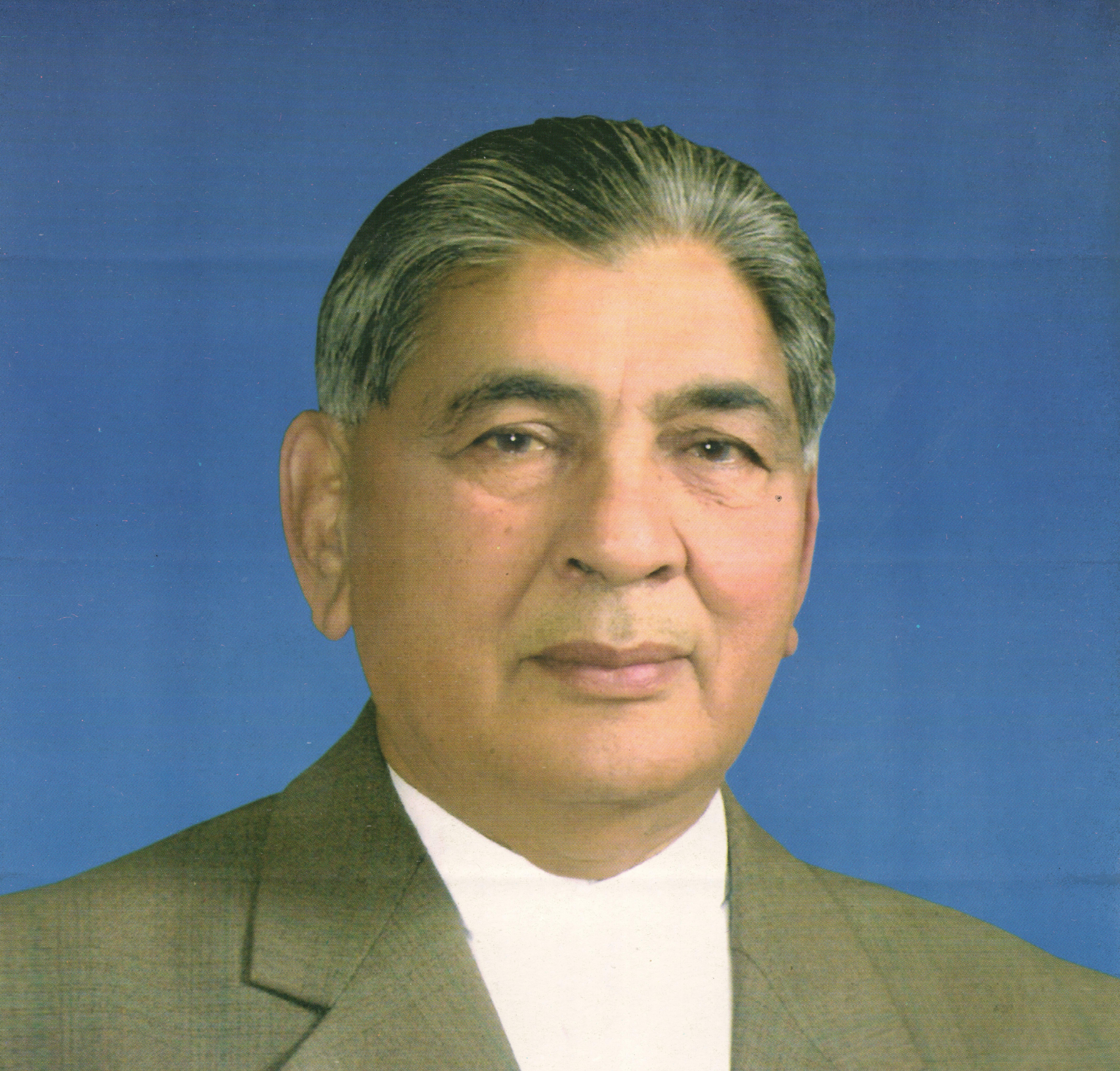

Provincial Minister of Khyber Pakhtunkhwa
- In office 2008 – 2009 (Revenue & Estate)

Minister for Religious Affairs, Auqaf & Zakat & Ushr
- In office 1988–1993

Minister for Local Government & Rural Development
- In office 1993–?

Member of the Provincial Assembly of Khyber Pakhtunkhwa
- In office 2008–2013
- Constituency: PK‑57 (Mansehra‑V) PK-38

Personal details
- Born: 13 April 1945 Mansehra District, Khyber Pakhtunkhwa, Pakistan
- Died: 25 July 2025 (aged 80) Abbottabad, Khyber Pakhtunkhwa, Pakistan
- Resting place: Mansehra
- Party: Independent (2008–2010); Pakistan Muslim League‑N (from 2009); later Jamiat Ulema-e-Islam (F) from 2022
- Other political affiliations: Qaumi Watan Party (formerly PPP-Sherpao)
- Parent: Haji Safdar Ali
- Occupation: Politician, lawyer, entrepreneur
- Known for: Mohsin-e-Tanawal, Politician, Advocate, Social Worker

Haji Habib Ur Rehman Tanoli, Advocate (13 April 1945 – 25 July 2025), also known as Mohsin-e-Tanawal (محسن تناول), was a Pakistani politician from Mansehra District, Khyber Pakhtunkhwa. He served multiple terms in Khyber Pakhtunkhwa's provincial government in various portfolios, including minister for revenue and estate.

== Political career ==
Tanoli was elected as a member of the Provincial Assembly in the 1988 and 1993 general elections. He was also elected as an independent member of the Khyber Pakhtunkhwa Assembly from constituency PK‑57 (Mansehra‑V) in 2008 and served until 2013. He initially held the portfolio of Revenue and Estate for about twenty months before joining the Pakistan Muslim League-N.

His daughter, Ghazala Habib Tanoli, also contested the 2002 Pakistani general election held under military ruler General Pervez Musharraf, during which the National Accountability Bureau arrested her father Tanoli for alleged illegal appointments in the education department.

== Death ==
Tanoli died due to cardiac arrest at his home in Abbottabad on 25 July 2025. His funeral prayers were held the following morning at Perhinna near his ancestral village. He was laid to rest in his ancestral graveyard in Mansehra.
