= Bherkund =

Bherkund Area of Lower Pakhli (ترلی پکھلی)
- Union council and town
- Country: Pakistan
- Region: Khyber-Pakhtunkhwa
- District: Mansehra District
- Time zone: UTC+5 (PST)

Bherkund is a village and union council (an administrative subdivision) of Mansehra District in Khyber-Pakhtunkhwa province of Pakistan. It is located in Mansehra Tehsil, between the cities of Mansehra and Oghi.

Bherkund is about 7 km away from the city Mansehra on the Oghi road. It is on the bank of river Siren which falls into Indus river after 30 km from here.
