= Talat Qayyum Qureshi =

Pakistani jurist

Chief Justice of the Peshawar High Court
- In office 3 November 2007 – 18 January 2008
- Preceded by: Tariq Pervez Khan
- Succeeded by: Muhammad Raza Khan

Judge of the Peshawar High Court
- In office 21 April 1999 – 18 January 2008

Personal details
- Died: 18 January 2008 Rawalpindi, Pakistan
- Profession: Jurist

Talat Qayyum Qureshi was a Pakistani jurist who served as a judge of the Peshawar High Court and later as its chief justice during the 2007–2008 emergency period.

== Judicial career ==
Qureshi was appointed an additional judge of the Peshawar High Court on 21 April 1999 and became a permanent judge in 2000. He continued to serve on the court through the 2000s, hearing constitutional, criminal, and administrative matters.

After the proclamation of emergency on 3 November 2007, Qureshi took oath under the Provisional Constitutional Order and served as chief justice of the Peshawar High Court. Following his death in office, Justice Muhammad Raza Khan was appointed chief justice on 21 January 2008.
