= Wajih-uz-Zaman Khan =

Wajeeh uz Zaman Khan

Khan of Agror
- Preceded by: Fakhar uz Zaman Khan

Personal details
- Born: October 27, 1965 (age 60) Mansehra, Hazara, Pakistan
- Party: Independent (formerly Pakistan Muslim League-N)
- Parents: Fakhar uz Zaman Khan (father); Fauzia Fakhar uz Zaman Khan (mother)
- Education: Bachelor of Arts; Bachelor of Law
- Alma mater: University of the Punjab

Wajeeh uz Zaman Khan Swati (born 27 October 1965) is a Pakistani politician and the current "Khan of Agror", a title previously entrusted upon his father (late) Fakhar uz Zaman Khan Advocate from Oghi, Khyber Pakhtunkhwa. He is first cousin of Pakistan’s former Prime Minister Imran Khan Niazi through his mother Fauzia Fakhar Uz Zaman Khan

== Background and early life ==
Wajeeh uz Zaman Khan was born in 1965 to a family of the Mansehra, Hazara region. His late father, Fakhar uz Zaman Khan, was a former member of the national assembly and a member of the defunct Majlis-e-shoora, who was descended from the Begal subsection of Swati tribe who had once ruled the Oghi/Agror area. They were later deposed in 1888 by the British colonial government, and his mother, Fauzia Fakhar uz Zaman Khan, formerly a member of the Senate of Pakistan, came from a family of Lahore, Punjab.

He holds a Bachelor of Law degree, and is an advocate of the High court of Islamabad.

== Legal and political career ==
After his father's death, Khan was expected to enter politics in the family tradition, However, After obtaining his basic school education from the Aitchison College Lahore, Khan went on to take a Bachelor of Arts degree and then a Law degree from the University of the Punjab, Lahore, Pakistan. He eventually took up the legal profession under the Islamabad High Court and for some years, and worked with a well reputed firm " Khan and Piracha Associates".

By the mid-1990s, he became increasingly involved in politics, and first contested the 1993 General Elections in Pakistan on a Pakistan Muslim League-N ticket, as a candidate for the PK-56 Mansehra provincial seat. He was successful in winning this seat and thereafter retaining it for a tenure of 22 years.

He was awarded the Ministry of Health in 1997 at the young age of 30 years. He retained his provincial seat till the year 2018.

In 2013 he won on the Pakistan Muslim League-N ticket. However, he later decided to bid farewell to the PML-N party. He made this decision after continuously asking for promised funds for his constituency. Since he did not receive funds and felt that the people voted for him expecting developmental work which he was previously known for, he decided to leave the party.

He is deemed as the only political personality of the area who has developed the valley of Agror into what it is today. He is regarded as the only politician who has a strict anti corruption policy and has never been accused of corruption in his 25 year tenure. Wajeeh uz Zaman Khan is one of the most respected personalities in the Khyber Pakhtunkhwa region.

He also served as the Chairman of DDAC Mansehra and has set a benchmark in performance for the position.
