= Zar Gul Khan =

Pakistani politician

Member of the Provincial Assembly of Khyber Pakhtunkhwa
- In office April 2017 – 28 May 2018
- Constituency: Constituency PK-62 (Kohistan-II)

Personal details
- Party: TLP (2025–present)
- Other political affiliations: PPP (2023–2025); PTI (2017–2023)
- Relations: Zareen Gul (brother)

Zar Gul Khan is a Pakistani politician who had been a Member of the Provincial Assembly of Khyber Pakhtunkhwa, from April 2017 to May 2018.

== Political career ==
He was elected unopposed to the Provincial Assembly of Khyber Pakhtunkhwa as a candidate of Pakistan Tehreek-e-Insaf (PTI) from Constituency PK-62 Kohistan-II in by-polls held in April 2017.

He ran for the seat of the National Assembly of Pakistan as a candidate of PTI from Constituency NA-14 (Mansehra-cum-Torghar) in the 2018 Pakistani general election but was unsuccessful. He received 59,638 votes and lost the seat to Muhammad Sajjad Awan.
