= Shahzada Muhammad Gushtasap Khan =

Member of the National Assembly of Pakistan from Khyber Pakhtunkhwa (2024–2029)

- شہزادہ محمد گُشتاسپ خان

Member of the National Assembly of Pakistan
- Incumbent
- Assumed office 29 February 2024
- Constituency: NA-15 Mansehra-cum-Torghar

Leader of the Opposition in the Provincial Assembly of the North-West Frontier Province
- In office 19 September 2003 – 10 October 2007
- Succeeded by: Akram Khan Durrani

Member of the Provincial Assembly of the North-West Frontier Province
- In office 27 November 2002 – 10 October 2007
- Succeeded by: Mufti Kifayatullah
- Constituency: PF-55 Mansehra-III

Personal details
- Party: PTI (2024-present)
- Other political affiliations: IND (2002-2018); PML(Q) (2008)

Shahzada Muhammad Gushtasap Khan (Urdu: شہزادہ محمد گُشتاسپ خان), is a Pakistani politician who is member of the National Assembly of Pakistan, since 2024 and has served previously as (Ex - Home and Interior Minister Planning and Development Minister Health Minister Education Minister and The First And only independent leader of opposition KPK)

== Political career ==
Khan was elected to the Provincial Assembly of the North-West Frontier Province as an independent candidate in the 2002 North-West Frontier Province provincial election from PF-55 Mansehra-III. He received 11,930 votes and defeated Mufti Kifayatullah, a candidate of Muttahida Majlis-e-Amal (MMA).

On 19 September 2003, he was selected as the Leader of the Opposition in the Provincial Assembly.

He contested the 2008 North-West Frontier Province provincial election as a candidate of Pakistan Muslim League (Q) (PML(Q)) from PF-55 Mansehra-III, but was unsuccessful. He received 22,217 votes and was defeated by Mufti Kifayatullah, a candidate of MMA.

He contested the 2013 Khyber Pakhtunkhwa provincial election as an independent candidate from PK-55 Mansehra-III, but was unsuccessful. He received 24,251 votes and was defeated by Saleh Muhammad Khan, a candidate of Pakistan Muslim League (N) (PML(N)).

He contested the 2018 Khyber Pakhtunkhwa provincial election as an independent candidate from PK-34 Mansehra-V, but was unsuccessful. He received 33,511 votes and was defeated by Sardar Muhammad Yousuf, a candidate of PML(N).

He won the 2024 Pakistani general election from NA-15 Mansehra-cum-Torghar as an independent candidate supported by Pakistan Tehreek-e-Insaf (PTI). He received 105,249 votes while runner up Nawaz Sharif, leader of PML(N), received 80,382 votes.
