= Haroon Khan Badshah =

Pakistani politician

Haroon Khan Badshah بادشاه خان
- Badsha Khan

Provincial Minister N.W.F.P Pakistan
- Muhammad Haroon Khan Badshah was the Khan (Feudal Lord) of sum a village in Mansehra. Badshah Khan was one of the most influential people of KPK and was the political successor of Khan Muhammad Abbas Khan
- In office 1973–1977

Personal details
- Born: 9 August 1909; Mansehra
- Died: September 6, 1983 (aged 74); Sum Elai-Mang, Pakistan
- Political party: Pakistan People's Party
- Children: Shahzada Muhammad Asif Khan Shahzada Muhammad Gushtasap Khan Shahzada Muhammad Azim Khan Shahzada Muhammad Arif Khan Shahzada Muhammad Kashif Khan

Haroon Khan Badshah also known as Badshah Khan (Urdu: بادشاه خان), was an ex-provincial Minister for Agriculture Khyber-Pakhtunkhwa, Member of Provincial Assembly of Khyber Pakhtunkhwa and the headman of Sum Elai-Mang a village in Sirran Valley, Mansehra District, Khyber Pakhtunkhwa. He belonged to Khankhail Tribe. Sum is also a union council (an administrative subdivision) of Mansehra District in Khyber-Pakhtunkhwa province of Pakistan.

== Political career ==
Badshah Khan a politician, Feudal lord/Landlord (Khan) and founder of Sum Elahi-Mang was known for his generosity towards his people. He was a member of the provincial assembly of KPK and a Minister of agriculture. He was also admired for giving service in partition process for Muslims of subcontinent. He was honoured with a Gold Medal for his contributions in Pakistan Movement (Tehreek-e-Pakistan) by the Government of Pakistan. Badshah Khan was known and famous for in Pakhal and Mansehra district for giving shelter and food to the needy and poor people.

== Badshah Khan's descendants ==
- Shahzada Muhammad Asif Khan. (First district president of Pakistan Peoples Party). Son (Shahzada Fahad Haroon Khan).
- Shahzada Muhammad Gushtasap Khan. (Ex Health, Education, Development, Family planning, Home and interior minister and leader of opposition KPK) sons (Shahzada Abdullah Haroon Khan and Shahzada Akbar Haroon Khan).
- Shahzada Muhammad Azam Khan (Ex chairman UC Sum-Elahi-Mang) sons (Shahzada Sikandar-e-Azim Khan, Shahzada Shahbaz Haroon Khan and Shahzada Moosa Haroon Khan).
- Shahzada Muhammad Arif Khan. (Ex chairman UC Sum-Elahi-Mang) sons (Shahzada Muhammad Ali Haroon Khan and Shahzada Ahmad Ali Haroon Khan).
- Shahzada Muhammad Kashif Khan. (Tehsil Member UC Sum-Elahi-Mang) sons (Shahzada Muhammad Haroon Khan. The second and Shahzada Muhammad Mehmmood Haroon Khan).

== See also ==
- List of Political Families of Pakistan
- Khan Mohammad Abbas Khan
- Mohammad Haneef Khan
- Shahzada Muhammad Gushtasap Khan
- Salahuddin Tirmizi
