= Zareen Gul =

Pakistani politician

Member of the Provincial Assembly of Khyber Pakhtunkhwa
- In office 29 May 2013 – 28 May 2018
- Constituency: Constituency PK-58 (Tor Ghar)

Personal details
- Party: Jamiat Ulema-e Islam (F)
- Relations: Zar Gul Khan (brother)

Zareen Gul is a Pakistani politician who had been a Member of the Provincial Assembly of Khyber Pakhtunkhwa, from May 2013 to May 2018.

He has been active in politics since 1985 and elected six times as MPA, more than any politician in KPK Assembly.

== Education ==
Zareen Gul got his education from Edwardes College Peshawar with a degree in Bachelors of Arts. He has thorough knowledge in political science, international relations and history. His major interest is in world history.

== Political career ==
He is active in politics since 1985. He was senior member of Awami National Party and close friend of Arbab Ayub Jan and Pervez Khattak.

His younger brother Zar Gul Khan is also active in politics.

He ran for the seat of the Provincial Assembly of the North-West Frontier Province as a candidate of Pakistan Muslim League (Q) from Constituency PF-58 (Mansehra-VI) in 2008 Pakistani general election but was unsuccessful. He received 14,588 votes and lost the seat to Namroz Khan, a candidate of Awami National Party (ANP).

He was elected to the Provincial Assembly of Khyber Pakhtunkhwa as a candidate of Jamiat Ulema-e Islam (F) from Constituency PK-58 Tor Ghar in 2013 Pakistani general election. He received 8,471 votes and defeated a candidate of ANP.
