= Perhinna =

Perhana
- Village and union council
- Country: Pakistan
- Region: Khyber Pakhtunkhwa
- District: Mansehra District
- Time zone: UTC+5 (PST)

Perhana (Urdu: پڑھنہ) is a village and union council (an administrative subdivision) of Mansehra District in the Khyber Pakhtunkhwa Province of Pakistan. It is located in the south of the district and lies to the west of the district capital Mansehra.

The main language spoken is Hindko. The major castes of Perhinna are Tanoli, Syeds, Awan, Khankhail and Gujjar.

== Environment ==
Most of the area is arid or rain-fed. About 45% of the people are involved in the agricultural sector. Timber is the main source of fuel.
