= Sacha Kalan =

Pakistani village

Sacha Kalan Upper Pakhli
- Village and union council
- سچاں کلاں
- Country: Pakistan
- Region: Khyber Pakhtunkhwa
- District: Mansehra District

Government
  - Khan: Sheraz khan swati
- Time zone: UTC+5 (PST)

Sacha Kalan is a village and union council (an administrative subdivision) of Mansehra District in the Khyber Pakhtunkhwa province of Pakistan. It is located in the north of the district where it borders Batagram District. It is majorly inhabited by Jehangiri Swatis.

Khan Muhammad Nasim Khan Jahangiri Swati adv and Khan Umer Khan Jahangiri were the prime figure and chiefs of this locality.

Former Minister Haq Nawaz Khan Swati, a son of Umer Khan also belongs to this village who served as Minister and MPA of KPK assembly for 5 times.
