= Nader Jahangiri =

Iranian linguist

- Born: 1945 (age 79–80)
- Education: University College London (PhD)
- Scientific career
- Fields: Sociolinguistics
- Institutions: Ferdowsi University of Mashhad
- Thesis: A sociolinguistic study of Tehrani Persian (1980)
- Doctoral advisor: Richard Hudson

Nader Jahangiri (born 1945) is an Iranian linguist and emeritus professor of linguistics at Ferdowsi University of Mashhad. He is known for his research on sociolinguistics.

== Books ==
- Gilaki Dialect of Lahijan, Research Institute for Languages and Cultures of Asia and Africa, 2003 ISBN 9784872978568
- A Sociolinguistic Study of Persian in Tehran, Institute for the Study of Languages and Cultures of Asia and Africa, 2000 ISBN 9784872977844
- Acoustic Phonetics, Dennis Fry, translated by N. Jahangiri, Ferdowsi University of Mashhad
