= Muhammad Safdar Awan =

Pakistani politician (born 1964)

- محمد صفدراعوان

Member of the National Assembly
- In office 1 June 2013 – 31 May 2018
- Constituency: NA-21 (Mansehra)
- In office June 2008 – March 2013
- Constituency: NA-52 (Rawalpindi-III)

Personal details
- Born: 19 January 1963 (age 63) Mansehra, Khyber Pakhtunkhwa, Pakistan
- Party: PML (N) (2007-present)
- Spouse: Maryam Nawaz (m. 1992)
- Relatives: Sajjad Awan (brother)

Muhammad Safdar Awan (Hindko and Urdu: محمد صفدر اعوان; born 19 January 1964) is a Pakistani politician and retired Pakistan Army officer and civil servant, who has been a member of the National Assembly of Pakistan from June 2008 to May 2018.

He is married to the PMLN supremo Nawaz Sharif's daughter Maryam Nawaz, who is currently serving as the Chief Minister of Punjab.

Often referred as Captain Safdar by his loyalists and in the media due to his past military career, because of his critical stance on secularism, his vocal support of Mumtaz Qadri and his repeated statements targeting the Ahmadiyya movement, he's generally considered to be a far-right politician.

== Early and personal life ==
According to PILDAT, Safdar was born on 19 January 1963. According to The News International and Dawn, he was born on 19 January 1964.

Safdar belongs to a traditionally middle-class Sufi family attached to the Barelvi movement; his father Muhammad Ishaq, who died in 2014, was a writer, being a poet and an essayist specialized in Islamic affairs. His father was also the General Secretary of the UC Garhi Habibullah. Safdar Awan was raised in the Hujra of Naseem Khan Khankhel Swati, a Khan of Garhi Habibullah and Wali of Neelishang State. His elder brother Sajjad Awan is also a politician. He also has a younger brother, Tahir Awan. He joined the Pakistan Army after completing his early education.

Safdar married Maryam Nawaz in 1992 while he was serving as captain in the Pakistan Army and has been the ADC to Nawaz Sharif during the latter's tenure as Prime Minister of Pakistan. After retiring from the Pakistan Army as captain he joined the civil services and was posted as Lahore Model Town assistant commissioner.

== Political career ==
Safdar joined politics after returning to Pakistan in 2007 along with the Sharif family. He was elected to the National Assembly as a candidate of Pakistan Muslim League (N) (PML-N) from Constituency NA-52 (Rawalpindi-III) in the by-election held in June 2008. He received 54,917 votes and defeated a candidate of Pakistan Muslim League (Q). The seat was vacated by Nisar Ali Khan.

In 2011, Safdar was made the chief organiser of the PML-N Youth Wing. In 2012, he was suspended from PML-N for verbally abusing leaders of PML-N.

Safdar was re-elected to the National Assembly as a candidate of PML-N from Constituency NA-21 (Mansehra-cum-Tor Ghar) in the 2013 Pakistani general election. He received 91,013 votes and defeated a candidate of Jamiat Ulema-e-Islam (F).

In May 2016, Safdar was reported to the Election Commission of Pakistan (ECP) by Imran Khan for concealing Maryam Nawaz’ assets. He denied it, however he was still summoned by ECP in June 2016.

In June 2018, he was allocated PML-N ticket to contest the 2018 general election from Constituency NA-14 (Mansehra-cum-Torghar). In July 2018, he was sentenced to one-year jail term in the Avenfield corruption reference filed by the National Accountability Bureau. As a result, he was disqualified from contesting election for 10 years. The next day, he arrived in Rawalpindi and surrendered to the authorities. In September 2018, he was released from Central Jail Rawalpindi on bail over the Avenfield corruption charges.

On 19 October 2020, Safdar was arrested from a Karachi hotel for “violating the sanctity of Quaid's mausoleum” and was released on bail the same day.

== Political views ==
=== Opposition to secularism ===
Safdar has been called "a vocal critic of secular politicians."

=== Blasphemy law ===
In 2012, he publicly supported Islamic fundamentalist Mumtaz Qadri, who assassinated former governor of Punjab Salmaan Taseer for speaking against the blasphemy law.

=== Ahmadiyya community ===
He has often voiced his concerns against the Ahmadiyya community in Pakistan and called for a ban on hiring Ahmadis in the armed forces and other important institutions of the country. He has been criticized for his statements against Ahmaddiya community.
