= Sum Elai-Mang =

Village in Pakistan

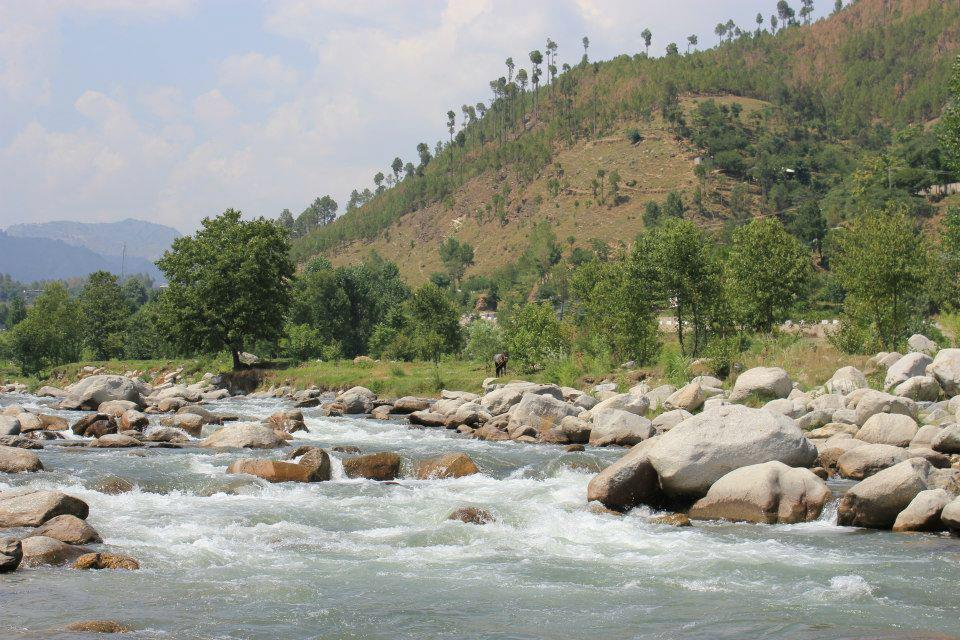
Sum Elai Mang

Sum Elai-Mang (Hindko:هندکو) or Sum is a village/state in Sirran Valley, Mansehra District, Khyber-Pakhtunkhwa. It is also a union council (an administrative subdivision) of Mansehra District in Khyber-Pakhtunkhwa province of Pakistan.

== Floods ==
A disaster took place in Sum during the floods of September 1992 and July 2001. The entire village was under flood and the schools and the houses of the local population floated away.
