= Battangi =

Khangiri is a village in Balakot Tehsil, Mansehra District of Pakistan. It is a hilly area surrounded by the neighboring villages, Kumi and Battangi. The majority of the population are farmers; However, some people are in government services. The literacy rate is progressing. The main tribe is Gujjar. It has all basic necessities of life like electricity, drinking water and roads. The prominent politician is Muhammad Sadaqat who made a lot of effort to develop the area. There are several schools, including a middle school located at the peak point of the village.
