= Muhammad Sajjad Awan =

Pakistani politician

Member of the National Assembly of Pakistan
- In office 13 August 2018 – 10 August 2023
- Constituency: NA-14 (Mansehra-cum-Torghar)

Personal details
- Other political affiliations: PMLN 1999- present
- Relations: Safdar Awan (brother)

Muhammad Sajjad Awan is a Pakistani politician who was a member of the National Assembly of Pakistan from August 2018 till August 2023.

In 2022, he was made the federal parliamentary secretary for Interior.

== Political career ==
He was elected to the National Assembly of Pakistan as a candidate of Pakistan Muslim League (N) from Constituency NA-14 (Mansehra-cum-Torghar) in the 2018 Pakistani general election. He received 74,889 votes and defeated Zar Gul Khan.
