= Abdul Jamil Khan =

Pakistani politician (1930–2021)

A. Jamil Khan
- Khan in 2008

Federal Minister for Population Welfare
- In office 21 November 2007 – 25 March 2008
- Preceded by: Ch.Shahbaz Hussain
- Succeeded by: Firdous Ashiq Awan

Personal details
- Born: 12 January 1930 Mansehra, British Raj
- Died: 17 October 2021 (aged 91) Abbottabad, Pakistan
- Party: Independent
- Relations: • T.M Khan (brother) • Justice Ejaz Swati (cousin) • G.H Khan, founder Highnoon (brother)
- Children: 7 including; P.J Khan Swati, Asad Jamil Khan
- Parent: Abdul Jaleel Khan Swati of Ahal (Father)
- Education: Royal College of Physicians and Surgeons of Glasgow
- Occupation: Professor of Medicine, Health Policy Maker, Medical Educationist

Abdul Jamil (A.J.) Khan (12 January 1930 – 17 October 2021) was a Pakistani doctor and hospital chairman. He received his early education from Forman Christian (FC) College Lahore and did his MBBS from King Edward Medical College Lahore. For further studies, he went to Britain and did his DCH, MRCP, FRCP. He was chairman of a private medical university and a private charitable hospital in Pakistan. He belonged to Arghushal family of Swati tribe.

== Achievements ==
Khan served in many important positions over the years, including;

- Federal Minister for Population welfare, Govt. of Pakistan.
- President Pakistan Medical & Dental Council.
- Member of the Advisory Committee of Health Govt. of Pakistan.
- Director General Health, Govt. of Pakistan.
- Former Vice-president of the EMRO (Eastern Mediterranean, Region) Regional Committee of WHO.
- Former President Pakistan Pharmacy Council.
- Founding Principal Ayub Medical College, Abbottabad
- Founding Principal Frontier Medical College, Abbottabad, Pakistan.
- Member of the Hospital and Health System Monitoring Committee of the Govt. of Pakistan.
- Principal Bolan Medical College, Quetta, Pakistan.

For his meritorious services, the Government of Pakistan decorated Khan with Sitara-e-Imtiaz (Star of Distinction) by the President of Pakistan, the highest award given to a civil servant.
