= Azam Swati =

Pakistani politician and businessman

Khan Azam Khan Swati خان محمد اعظم خان سواتی
- Chief of Swatis; Khan of Gedarpur and Chajar
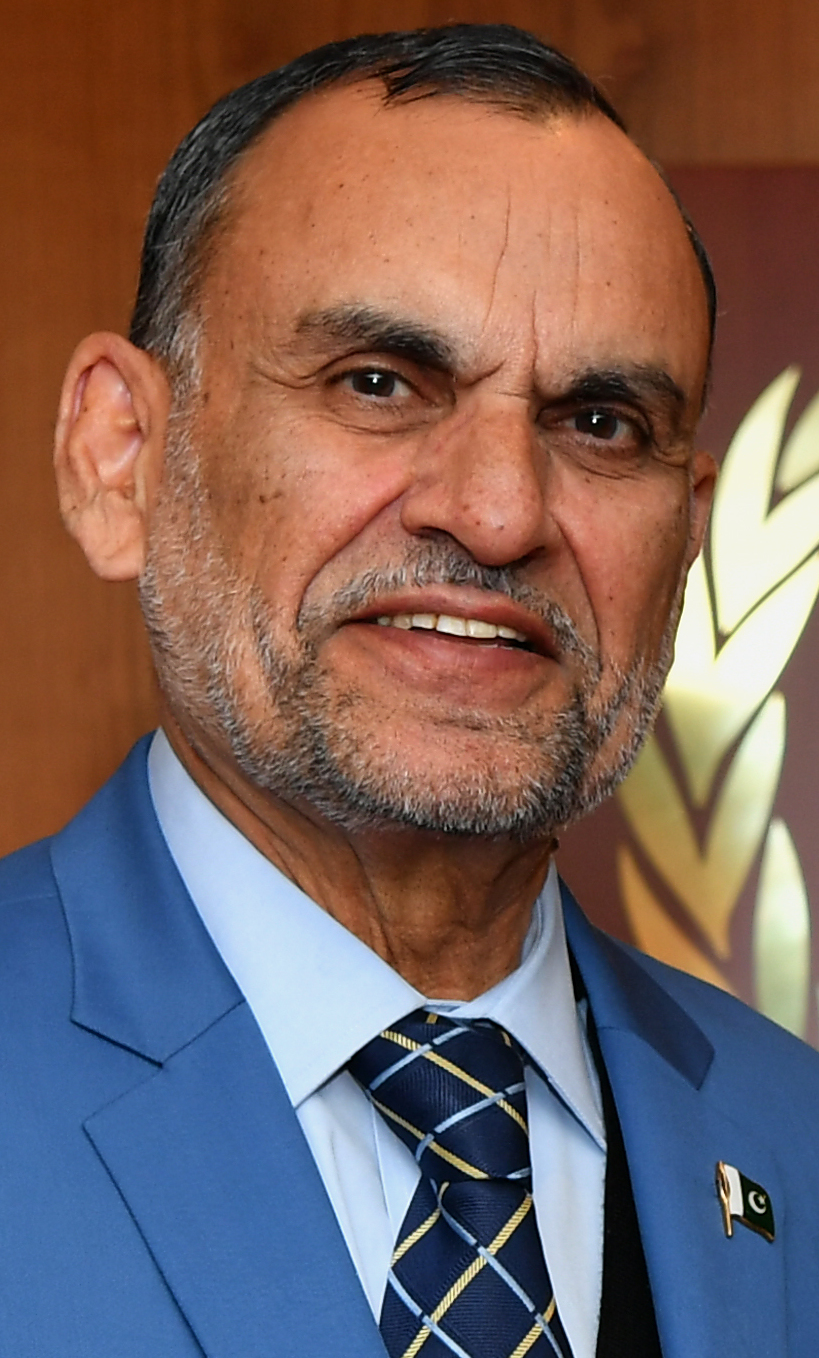
- Muhammad Azam Khan Swati in 2018

Minister of Narcotics Control and Railways
- In office 6 April 2020 – 10 April 2022
- President: Arif Alvi
- Prime Minister: Imran Khan
- Preceded by: Imran Khan
- Succeeded by: Shahzain Bugti

Minister of Parliamentary Affairs
- In office 18 April 2019 – 6 April 2020
- President: Arif Alvi
- Prime Minister: Imran Khan
- Deputy: Ali Muhammad Khan
- Preceded by: Ijaz Ahmed Shah
- In office 31 March 2008 – 10 December 2010
- President: Asif Ali Zardari
- Prime Minister: Yusuf Raza Gillani
- Succeeded by: Ishfaq Ahmad Khan

Member of the Senate
- Incumbent
- Assumed office 25 July 2025
- Constituency: Teachnocrats seat from Khyber Pakhtunkhwa
- In office 12 March 2018 – 12 March 2024
- President: Mamnoon Hussain; Arif Alvi; Asif Ali Zardari
- Constituency: General seat from Khyber Pakhtunkhwa
- In office 22 March 2003 – 17 December 2011
- President: Pervez Musharraf; Asif Ali Zardari
- Constituency: General seat from Khyber Pakhtunkhwa

Personal details
- Born: 22 June 1956 (age 70) Mansehra, Khyber Pakhtunkhwa, Pakistan
- Citizenship: Pakistani; American (renounced)
- Party: PTI (2011–present)
- Other political affiliations: JUI (F) (2002–2011)
- Relatives: Laiq Muhammad Khan (brother)
- Education: University of Peshawar; University of Karachi; University of Houston
- Profession: Politician; Lawyer; Businessman

Muhammad Azam Khan Swati (Urdu: محمد اعظم خان سواتی; born 22 June 1956) is a Pakistani politician and businessman who served as the Minister of Narcotics Control and Railways from 2020 to 2022. He is the elected senior vice president of the Pakistan Tehreek-e-Insaf. He belongs to the Swati tribe of Mansehra.

Early in his life, Swati had moved to the United States to escape political victimization by Zia-ul-Haq because of his democratic activism, where owned a chain of stores, was a member of the Pakistani American Congress and played important role in high-profile charity events, while in parallel practicing law.

Returning to Pakistan, he joined the Jamiat Ulema-e-Islam in 2002 and became a senator in 2003 but resigned in 2011 and joined the Pakistan Tehreek-e-Insaf (PTI). In 2018, he was again elected as a senator on PTI's ticket. He has served as Minister of Parliamentary Affairs from 18 April 2019 to 6 April 2020 in the cabinet of Prime Minister Imran Khan.

== Early life and education ==
Swati was born in Mansehra, Khyber Pakhtunkhwa, and belongs to the Jalangial Alisheri family in the Mitravi sub-clan of the Swati ethnic group. He is great-grandson of Jagirdar Akbar Khan Swati, the Khan of Gidarpur village, Mansehra, who held the title of Kursi Nashin and was a member of Queen Victoria's 34-member cabinet during the British Raj.

His paternal grandfather, Ahmed Akbar Khan Swati was educated at Aligarh Muslim College and served as a district magistrate and tehsildar during the British Raj before resigning from government service in 1916 to join the All-India Muslim League. Khan was assassinated in 1929 during evening prayers at Akbar Mosque, Gedarpur, reportedly on the orders of British authorities.

His maternal grandfather Khan Sahib Haji Faqeera Khan Swati was chief of Malakpur village located in Mansehra District and the elected MLA of Indian National Congress in 1937 Indian provincial elections.

Hubert Digby Watson in Hazara Gazetteer 1907 wrote about Azam Swati's maternal grandfather that "Faqira Khan Swati is a thorn in the nose of us Englishmen".

Because his family members, including his father, his uncles and his cousins, were already involved in local politics, he had early exposure to politics, competing in school and college debates and being elected president of the student council numerous times. His brother Laiq Muhammad Khan is also a politician.

In terms of education, Swati earned his B.A from the Post Graduate College, Abbottabad; his M.A (Economics) from the University of Peshawar; his LL.B (Bachelor of Law) as a gold medalist from the University of Karachi; his M.A (Political Science) also from the University of Karachi (Pakistan); his LL.M (Master of Laws) from the University of Houston Law Center, USA; his Doctor of Jurisprudence (JD) from the South Texas College of Law; and his Texas State Bar Certified Attorney at Law.

== Business and legal career in the United States ==
Having migrated to the United States in 1978, Swati began by working in a convenience store for $2.50 an hour. Over the years he eventually himself became the owner of several C-stores. In 1997, he founded the Pak-Oil Company and acquired jobber-ship for Exxon and other major oil and gas companies, being involved in fuel distribution and wholesale business. He also invested in real estate in Texas' Golden Triangle and neighbouring Louisiana.

Swati would remain active both in business, eventually owning more than 100 convenience stores, apartment buildings and restaurant franchises in East Texas and Louisiana, and also in law, as an attorney in Houston, Texas, before renouncing his American citizenship in 2003, having returned to Pakistan in 2001 and joined its politics.

== Political career in Pakistan ==
=== Early career and move to the United States ===
Swati became active in politics in the 1970s, when he was a practicing lawyer in Karachi and jailed many times for protesting against the military dictatorship of Zia-ul-Haq. This is the reason why he would move to the United States in 1978.

=== Return to the United States and Jamiat Ulema-e-Islam (F) ===
After moving back to Pakistan in 2001, he'd be elected as district nazim of Mansehra, noted for not accepting any salary or security protocol. He would then become a senator on a Jamiat Ulema-e-Islam (F) ticket, having joined the party in 2002. During these years he'd also help establish the Hazara University.

Between 2008 and 2010, Swati had pursued the Hajj corruption case in the Supreme Court relentlessly, which ultimately forced the government to sack former religious affairs minister Hamid Saeed Kazmi

=== Pakistan Tehreek-e-Insaf (PTI) ===
In 2011, he joined Imran Khan's PTI.

In December 2020, he was appointed Federal Minister for Railways.

== Arrests ==
=== Multiple arrests for 'obnoxious tweets' against state institutions ===
Swati was taken into custody on 13 October 2022 by the Federal Investigation Agency's (FIA) cybercrime unit for allegedly making ‘controversial tweets’ against state institutions. The case was registered under Section 20 of the Prevention of Electronic Crimes Act (PECA) and section 109 of the offense of aiding and abetting. A district and session court in Islamabad on 21 October 2022 granted him post-arrest bail against surety bond worth PKR 1 million.

Swati was arrested again on 27 November after the Federal Investigation Agency (FIA) booked him in Islamabad over a “highly obnoxious campaign of intimidating tweets [...] against state institutions”. It was the second time that Swati was booked and arrested by the FIA over his tweets about army officials in less than two months. Islamabad High Court approved Swati's post-arrest bail on 3 January 2023 against the submission of surety bonds worth Rs 200,000.

=== Torture ===
According to Azam Swati, he was stripped naked and constantly beaten and assaulted by military forces after his arrest in 2022. Swati has stated that military officials were behind his custodial torture. Swati officially said that “They kept beating me” and urged institutions to investigate his torture. He claimed that authorities beat him the “entire way” after his arrest and violated the privacy and integrity of his family. Former Prime Minister of Pakistan, Imran Khan and the Senate Standing Committee on Human Rights condemned his torture. During press conferences and statements, Swati revealed in 2022 that it was the Pakistan Armed Forces and authorities that were behind his arrest and torture.
