= Mohammad Aslam Khan (Pakistan Peoples Party politician) =

Pakistani politician

Sardar Muhammad Aslam

Member of the Senate of Pakistan
- In office 1973–1977

President of the Pakistan Peoples Party, Hazara Division
- In office 1967–1977

Personal details
- Born: June 1937 Nawanshehr, Abbottabad District, British India
- Died: 12 December 1997
- Party: Pakistan Peoples Party
- Parent: Captain Sardar Zain Muhammad Khan (father)
- Education: University of Peshawar
- Occupation: Lawyer, politician

Senator Sardar Muhammad Aslam Advocate (June 1937 – 12 December 1997) was member of the upper house of parliament of Pakistan (the Senate). He was twice elected as senator on the Pakistan Peoples Party ticket. He was also member of Pakistan Peoples Party central executive committee and President Pakistan Peoples Party Hazara division from 1967 to 1977. He was also a three-time president of the District Bar Association Abbottabad.

== Background ==
Sardar Aslam was born in Nawanshehr, District Abbottabad. He was son of Captain Sardar Zain Muhammad Khan, elder of the Karlal tribe of Abbottabad and one of earliest parliamentarians of North-West Frontier Province (NWFP) from Hazara. The elder Sardar was elected as Member Legislative Assembly of NWFP in 1946 elections on the ticket of All India Muslim League from Abbottabad and, after the creation of Pakistan, also served as parliamentary secretary for education till 1952.

Sardar Muhammad Aslam was a law graduate from Peshawar University and initially joined the North-West Frontier Province police department as prosecutor, but in 1966 he resigned from service and started law practice in District Bar Abbottabad.

== Political career ==
He remained President of the Pakistan Peoples Party (PPP) Hazara Division and member Central Executive Committee of PPP from 1967–77. He along with Hayyat Sherpao Shaeed was a pioneer who laid the foundations of PPP in NWFP. In the initial phase of organizing of the PPP he was one of the close aides of Zulfiqar Ali Bhutto.

In 1973 he became member of the first Senate of Pakistan for a three-year term by ballot and later on in 1976 was again nominated by Bhutto for another term of six years. He remained a member of the Senate until the imposition of the Martial Law in 1977. He also represented Pakistan in International Parliamentarians Congress 1976 in Colombo and was also member of Pakistan's delegation to China in 1974 and 1975. He also served as President of District Bar Association Abbottabad three times. Apart from national politics, throughout his life he remained an influential tribal elder of district Abbottabad. He died on 12 December 1997.
