= Ejaz Afzal Khan =

Retired Judge

Ejaz Afzal Khan is a Pakistani retired jurist who served as a judge of the Supreme Court of Pakistan from 2011 to 2018. Previously, he served as the chief justice of the Peshawar High Court from 2009 to 2011. He also served as the acting chief justice of the Supreme Court of Pakistan in 2017.

== Early life and education ==
Ejaz Afzal Khan was born on 8 May 1953 in Mansehra. He received his early education from the Government College, Mansehra. Later, he attended Khyber Law College, where he studied law and graduated in 1977.

== Career ==
Khan was admitted as an advocate to the Supreme Court of Pakistan in 1991.

In September 2000, Khan was appointed as a judge of the Peshawar High Court during the administration of Pervez Musharraf. Notably, Khan declined to take the oath under the Provisional Constitutional Order on November 3, 2007, and did not accept the Naek formula.

Khan was one of the judges reinstated on March 16, 2009, after the lawyers' movement, along with former Chief Justice Iftikhar Muhammad Chaudhry. After serving as a Peshawar High Court judge for nine years, he was appointed Chief Justice of the Peshawar High Court in October 2009 and was elevated to the Supreme Court on November 17, 2011. He authored many most important cases in the history of Pakistan including panama papers which led to the disqualification of the then Prime Minister Sharif in 2017 .
