= Laiq Muhammad Khan =

Pakistani politician (born 1958)

Member of the National Assembly of Pakistan
- In office 2010–2013
- Constituency: NA-21 (Mansehra-II)

Member of the Provincial Assembly of Khyber Pakhtunkhwa
- In office 13 August 2018 – 18 January 2023
- Constituency: PK-35 (Torghar)

Personal details
- Born: 8 July 1958 (age 67) Mansehra, Khyber Pakhtunkhwa, Pakistan
- Party: PTI (2024–present)
- Other political affiliations: JUI (F) (2013-2015) PMLN (2015-2018) ANP (2018-2023)
- Relatives: Azam Khan Swati (brother); Khan Haji Faqeera Khan Swati(Maternal Grandfather)

Laiq Muhammad Khan Swati (born 8 July 1958) is a Pakistani politician who had been a member of the National Assembly of Pakistan from 2010 to 2013. He is currently serving as member of the Provincial Assembly of Khyber Pakhtunkhwa for the second time consecutively.

== Early life and education ==
He was born on 8 July 1958 in Mansehra, Khyber Pakhtunkhwa, and earned his BA degree in 1978.

His elder brother Azam Swati and his son Ahmed Shehryar Khan are also politicians.

== Political career ==
He was elected to the National Assembly of Pakistan from Constituency NA-21 (Mansehra-II) as a candidate of Jamiat Ulema-e Islam (F) (JUI-F) in by-polls held in January 2010. He received 36,622 votes and defeated Zur Gul Khan, a candidate of Pakistan Muslim League (Q) (PML-Q).

He ran for the seat of the National Assembly from Constituency NA-21 (Mansehra-cum-Tor Ghar) as a candidate of JUI-F in the 2013 Pakistani general election but was unsuccessful. He received 43,342 votes and lost the seat to Muhammad Safdar Awan.

In 2015, he left JUI-F and joined Pakistan Muslim League (N) (PML-N).

He was elected to the Provincial Assembly of Khyber Pakhtunkhwa as a candidate of Awami National Party (ANP) from Constituency PK-35 (Torghar) in the 2018 Pakistani general election. Following his successful election, he was named by the opposition parties as its joint candidate for the office of Speaker of Khyber Pakhtunkhwa Assembly. He received 27 votes and lost the seat to Pakistan Tehreek-e-Insaf (PTI) candidate Mushtaq Ahmed Ghani who secured 81 votes.

He is elected to the Provincial Assembly of Khyber Pakhtunkhwa as an independent candidate from Constituency PK-41 (Torghar) in the 2024 Pakistani general election. He joined Pakistan Tehreek e Insaf after winning the election.
