= Fauzia Fakhar-uz-Zaman Khan =

Pakistani politician

Senator of Pakistan
- In office March 2006 – March 2012
- Constituency: KPK

Personal details
- Party: Pakistan Muslim League (PML)

Fauzia Fakhar-uz-Zaman Khan Swati is a Pakistani politician who served as a Senator from March 2006 to March 2012. She is a member of the Pakistan Muslim League (PML) and represented the province of KPK in the Senate of Pakistan. She is sister of Shaukat Khanum, the mother of Imran Khan.
