= Saleh Muhammad Khan =

Pakistani politician

Saleh Muhammad Khan Swati

Member of the National Assembly of Pakistan
- In office 13 August 2018 – 10 August 2023
- Constituency: NA-13 (Mansehra-I)

Member of the Provincial Assembly of Khyber Pakhtunkhwa
- In office 29 May 2013 – 28 May 2018
- Constituency: Constituency PK-55 (Mansehra-III)

President of PTI Hazara Division
- In office 16 January 2023 – 17 July 2023
- Chairman: Imran Khan
- Succeeded by: Babar Saleem Swati

Personal details
- Party: JIP (2025-present)
- Other political affiliations: PTI-P (2023-2025); PTI (2018-2023); PMLN (2013-2018)

Saleh Muhammad Swati is a Pakistani politician who had been a member of the National Assembly of Pakistan from August 2018 till August 2023. Previously he was a Member of the Provincial Assembly of Khyber Pakhtunkhwa, from May 2013 to May 2018.

== Education ==
He has received intermediate level education.

== Political career ==
He was elected to the Provincial Assembly of Khyber Pakhtunkhwa as a candidate of Pakistan Muslim League (N) (PML-N) from Constituency PK-55 Mansehra-III in the 2013 Pakistani general election. He received 28,688 votes and defeated an independent candidate, Shahzada Gustasap Khan.

He was elected to the National Assembly of Pakistan as an independent candidate from NA-13 (Mansehra-I) with support from PTI in the 2018 Pakistani general election. He received 109,282 votes and defeated PML-N candidate Shahjahan Yousuf. Following the election, he announced to join Pakistan Tehreek-e-Insaf (PTI).

== See also ==
- Swati (Pashtun tribe)
