= Tariq Mehmood Jahangiri =

Pakistani jurist

Justice of the Islamabad High Court
- In office 28 December 2020 – 18 December 2025

Personal details
- Born: 10 July 1965 (age 61)
- Education: Government Gordon College; Federal Government Post Graduate College; University of Karachi

Supreme Court of Pakistan

Tariq Mehmood Jahangiri (Urdu: طارق محمود جہانگیری; born 10 July 1965) is a Pakistani former judge who served as a Justice of the Islamabad High Court, from 28 December 2020 till his removal on 18 December 2025.

== Early life and education ==
Jahangiri was born on 10 July 1965. He originates from Jahangiri clan of Swati tribe and belongs to Mansehra District, Khyber Pakhtunkhwa. He received his early education in Peshawar.

In 1979, he relocated to Islamabad and pursued his studies at Islamabad Model College, Government Gordon College, and Federal Government Post Graduate College in Islamabad. He attained his law degree from the University of Karachi. In July 2024, it was alleged that his law degree from University of Karachi was fake. Consequently, a complaint was filed in the Supreme Judicial Council of Pakistan against Justice Jahangiri. As per reports, University of Karachi letter did not describe the degree as "bogus" but rather referred to it as "invalid." The Islamabad High Court also took notice of the campaign surrounding Jahangiri's degree.

== Career ==
Jahangiri began his legal career by becoming an advocate of the District Courts and joined the Islamabad Bar Association in 1992. He became an advocate of the High Courts in 1994 and of the Supreme Court of Pakistan in 2008.

In 1992, he founded his own law firm, "Jahangiri Law Associates," in Islamabad. His involvement in legal associations includes serving as President of the Islamabad High Court Bar Association from 2016 to 2017 and holding positions as President and General Secretary of the Islamabad Bar Council from 2005 to 2006, and from 2002 to 2003, respectively.

On 28 December 2020, President Arif Alvi appointed him as Justice of the Islamabad High Court.

In 2023, he gained attention when he issued a blanket protection order to Imran Khan, preventing the police from arresting him in potential future criminal cases. Following which leaders of the PML-N party accused him of showing bias in favor of PTI.

Over the "Bogus" Degree case surrounding Jahangiri's Law degree obtained from University of Karachi a bench led by Chief Justice Islamabad High court barred him from judicial work until the final decision from the Supreme Judicial Council of Pakistan. He challenged this decision in the supreme court

== Controversies ==
=== Allegations of harassment by intelligence agencies ===
On 26 March 2024, six judges of the Islamabad High Court, including Jahangiri, wrote a letter to the Supreme Judicial Council of Pakistan, alleging interference by the Inter-Services Intelligence in judicial matters. They cited instances of pressure on judges through the abduction and torture of their relatives and secret surveillance within their residences. Additionally, they questioned the existence of a state policy aimed at intimidating and coercing judges. Subsequently, the next day, Chief Justice of Pakistan (CJP) Qazi Faez Isa convened a full court session to investigate the accusations raised by the judges.
