= Shahjahan Yousuf =

Pakistani politician

Member of the National Assembly of Pakistan
- In office 2002–2013

Personal details
- Party: Pakistan Muslim League (N) 2004 present
- Parent: Sardar Muhammad Yousuf Gujjar (father)

Sardar Shahjahan Yousuf (Urdu: سردار شاه ‌جہاں یوسف) is a Pakistani politician who has been a Member of the National Assembly of Pakistan from 2002 to 2013. Currently he is member of the Provincial Assembly of Khyber Pakhtunkhwa PK-40 Mansehra-V. He was earlier elected MNA in 2002 General Elections from the platform of PML(N) and again got elected as MNA in 2008 from the same platform. He remained Minister of State for Health and Professional Technical Training Department in 2010. He also served as Special Assistant to the Prime Minister of Pakistan in April 2022. He is the son of famous politician Sardar Muhammad Yousaf Zaman.

== Political career ==
He was elected to the National Assembly of Pakistan from NA-20 (Mansehra-I) as candidate of Pakistan Muslim League (Q) (PML-Q) in the 2002 Pakistani general election.

He was re-elected to the National Assembly of Pakistan from NA-20 (Mansehra-I) as candidate of Pakistan Muslim League (Q) (PML-Q) in the 2008 Pakistani general election. In 2011, he was inducted into the federal cabinet of Prime Minister Yousaf Raza Gillani as minister of state for Production. In 2012, he was inducted into the federal cabinet of Prime Minister Raja Pervaiz Ashraf as minister of state.
