= Ejaz Swati =

Justice of the Balochistan High Court

Muhammad Ejaz Swati
- محمد اعجاز سواتی

Senior Justice of the Balochistan High Court
- Incumbent
- Assumed office 11 March 2024
- Preceded by: Muhammad Hashim Kakar

Justice of the Balochistan High Court
- Incumbent
- Assumed office 2 September 2015

Personal details
- Born: 6 June 1963 (age 63) Quetta
- Education: University of Balochistan (MA); University Law College, Quetta (LL.B)

Muhammad Ejaz Swati (Urdu: محمد اعجاز سواتی, born 6 June 1963) is a Pakistani jurist who served as the Chief Justice of the Balochistan High Court (BHC) in May and June 2025. He belongs to Arghushal family, basically hailing from Ahal village in Mansehra District. He is a cousin of Abdul Jamil Khan.
