= Muhammad Raza Khan =

- محمد رضا خان

Advisor Legislative Drafting Senate of Pakistan
- Incumbent
- Assumed office March 2016
- Nominated by: Mian Raza Rabbani

Member, Council of Islamic Ideology, Pakistan
- In office June 2016 – March 2025
- Nominated by: Mamnoon Hussain

Federal Secretary, Government of Pakistan Ministry of Law, Justice and Human Rights
- In office January 2012 – April 2016
- Nominated by: Nawaz Sharif

Chief Justice, Peshawar High Court
- In office January 2008 – August 2008
- Nominated by: Pervez Musharraf

Justice, Peshawar High Court
- In office January 2005 – December 2007
- Nominated by: Pervez Musharraf

Muhammad Raza Khan (Urdu:محمد رضا خان) is a former advisor to the Senate of Pakistan, a former Federal Secretary, Ministry of Law, Justice and Human Rights and a retired Chief Justice of Peshawar High Court. He was born in District Mansehra, Khyber Pakhtunkhwa on 8 August 1946.

== Education ==
After graduating from the University of Peshawar in 1967, Khan completed double Masters from the same University, in Political Science (1969), and English Literature (1971). After that, he obtained his LLB degree, also from the University of Peshawar in 1973, where received a gold medal, but a President of Pakistan award.

== Overseas trainings ==
In 1988 he attended a training workshop on the role of Middle Management in Turkey. In 1990, he proceeded to London to attend a training on British Parliamentary Commissioners Organizational Setup & Procedure at the Parliamentary Commissioners Office, United Kingdom. In 2000, Khan attended a workshop on Enforcement of intellectual property rights organized by the World Intellectual Property Organization (WIPO), Tehran, Iran.

== Judicial and Executive Experience ==
After passing the competitive examination, Khan joined the PCS (Judicial Branch) in 1975, as a Civil Judge, and was promoted as Senior Civil Judge in 1977. In 1980, he was made the Additional District & Sessions Judge and thereafter District & Sessions Judge in 1982.

Upon the creation of the office of Ombudsmen in Pakistan Wafaqi Mohtasib secretariat, Khan took charge as Director in 1983 and was subsequently promoted as Director General (Complaints) and held the post between 1987 and 1994.

From 1994 to 1995, he was appointed as Secretary, Attorney-General for Pakistan Office of Attorney-General of Pakistan (AGFP). In 1994, he was appointed as Member, Federal Service Tribunal and he held this office till 1998.

He assumed his duties at the Ministry of Law, Justice and Human Rights as Joint Secretary, in the year 2000 and was serving in the same capacity, till 2004, when he was elevated as Judge, Peshawar High Court. While still in service, in 2007, he was appointed as Federal Secretary, Ministry of Law, Justice and Human Rights and after keeping that charge, for little over a year, in 2008 he was elevated and sworn in as the Chief Justice, Peshawar High Court from where he retired upon attaining the age of superannuation, on 8 August 2008.

== Post-retirement honors ==
After laying down the robes, in 2010 Justice Khan was given the task to serve the Parliament of Pakistan as a Constitutional Expert, 18th Amendment Implementation Commission between 2010-11. After successful completion of tenure in 2011, Khan joined the office of Ombudsmen in Pakistan as Senior Advisor, Federal Ombudsman.

In 2012, he assumed office, for the second time, as Federal Secretary, Ministry of Law, Justice and Human Rights and held that charge till late 2013 when he was appointed as Special Secretary, Ministry of Law, Justice and Human Rights till his tenure completed in April 2016, As the Law Secretary, Justice Khan, was also holding portfolio of Member, Law and Justice Commission of Pakistan.

In 2016, Justice Khan was called upon to serve the Senate of Pakistan, the Upper House of Parliament and he took over the charge of Advisor, Legislative Drafting. Throughout his association with the Upper House of Parliament, Justice Khan has provided expert briefings to various parliamentary bodies, including the Functional Committee on Human Rights, the Committee on Law and Justice, and committees reviewing amendments regarding special courts and the National Accountability Bureau (NAB). He actively contributed subject-matter expertise during key sessions dealing with judicial reforms and the merger of special courts into ordinary jurisdictions.

In 2016, Justice Khan had the opportunity to serve the Council of Islamic Ideology where he assumed his duties as Member of the Council. He served on the Council for three (3) consecutive terms from 2016-19, 2019-22 and 2022-2025, completing a total of Nine (9) Years on the Council before relinquishing office in March 2025

During the Tenure of the Federal Ombudsman of Pakistan Mr. Salman Faruqui, Justice Khan assisted the Federal Ombudsman in an advisory capacity, significantly modernizing the institution and expanding its outreach. Subsequently, Justice Khan was given additional responsibility on a permanent basis as he joined the office of the Federal Ombudsman of Pakistan in 2017 for a Second time assuming the office as Senior Advisor to the Federal Ombudsman where he continued to serve for the next 2 tenures between 2017-21 alongside Mr. Tahir Shahbaz and subsequently between 2022-2026 alongside Federal Ombudsman Mr.Ejaz Ahmed Qureshi

== Academic and Professional Engagements ==
Justice Khan has immensely contributed to policy and judicial education as a member of the Board of Governors for the Federal Judicial Academy. Moreover, Pakistan Institute for Parliamentary Services in Islamabad has functioned under his institutional guidance for legislative development and capacity building, a body which facilitates training sessions for law makers on the Constitution.

Justice Khan has been recognized in the field of legal governance and over the years has accumulated and contributed extensively as a trainer, guest lecturer and advisor to public, private, and development-sector organizations, specializing in capacity building, policy guidance, and institutional development. He regularly speaks on the administrative procedures, practices, and informal dispute resolution mechanisms to process public grievances against government agencies.

On the academic front, Justice Khan has remained on the Board of Governors of Gomal University, D.I.Khan while he was serving as a Judge, Peshawar High Court, D.I.Khan Bench (2004-05). Subsequently, he was nominated by the Chief Justice Peshawar High Court as the Syndicate Member of Women University Mardan where he served as Senior Syndicate Member for 2 Tenures between 2021-23 and 2023-25. He continues to serve on the Governing Body of Al-Mizan Institute of Legal Studies.

Legal offices
Preceded by Tallat Qayyum Qureshi	Chief Justice Peshawar High Court; 21 January 2008 – 7 August 2008	Succeeded by Jahenzeb Rahim
