= Khan Khudadad Khan Swati =

Pakistani independence activist and politician

1st Health Minister Of West Pakistan Khan Of Bhogarmang Valley
- In office 14 October 1955 – 27 August 1957
- Monarch: Elizabeth II
- President: Iskander Mirza
- Governor-General: Iskander Mirza
- Governor: Mushtaq Ahmed Gurmani
- Preceded by: Position established

Personal details
- Born: Bhogarmang Valley, Mansehra Tehsil, NWFP Province, British India (Now, Khyber Pakhtunkhwa, Pakistan)
- Party: All India Muslim League; Pakistan Muslim League
- Relations: Khan Bahadur Muzzafar Khan (Uncle)
- Children: Khan Riaz Khan Swati ( Current Khan Of Bhogarmang Valley)

Khan Khudadad Khan Swati was a prominent Pakistan independence movement activist, politician and member of All India Muslim League. He had been a member of the West Pakistan Provincial Assembly from Mansehra District. He also served as Minister of Health of West Pakistan. He was the former Khan of Bhogarmang Valley. Khudadad Colony, located in front of Mazar E Quaid is named after him. He belonged to the Jehangiri family of the Swati tribe.

== Family ==
He was born into the "Chief of Bhogarmang" family. His uncle, Muhammad Muzzafar Khan Swati, was a powerful Khan and Jagirdar who was granted the title of Khan Bahadur by the British Viceroy for helping mediate an agreement between the British Raj and Arsala Khan Swati (Khan of Allai, who had rebelled against the British).

His son, Khan Riaz Khan Jehangiri, later served as a member of Majlis E Shura during general Zia ul Haq's regime.

== Contributions ==
Following are the projects whose foundation stone had been laid by Khan Khudadad Khan Swati during his term as a Health Minister

- Mental Hospital, Dhodial Mansehra District (Now Hazara University).
- He introduced a drainage system in the Siran Valley.
- Civil Hospital Abbottabad
- Dhaka Medical Complex, Bangladesh
- Chittogram Medical Complex, Bangladesh
- Civil Hospital, Karachi
- Rawalpindi General Hospital (Now Benezir Hospital), Rawalpindi
- Dadar Sanatorium, Siran Valley, Mansehra
- Shah Rukhne Alam Hospital, Multan
- Mental Restoration Center, Hyderabad
