= Khan Mohammad Abbas Khan =

Indian politician

Khan Muhammad Abbas Khan

Khan Muhammad Abbas Khan is a former member of Indian National Congress, a liberal reformer, Khan Mohammad Abbas Khan belonged to the Democratic Party, which formed a coalition with congress and served as the Interim Minister for Industries of British India. Later on he joined Muhammad Ali Jinnah. He was a freedom fighter as well as an active member of PML. He was 1 out of 3 MLA's from Mansehra. Khan Abbas Khan belonged to Khankhail tribe of mansehra. He belonged to the moderate faction of Indian National Congress headed by Gopal Krishna Gokhale, and supported the efforts of Mahatma Gandhi and his satyagraha form of resistance.

== See also ==
- List of Political Families of Pakistan
- Haroon Khan Badshah
- Mohammad Haneef Khan
- Shahzada Muhammad Gushtasap Khan
- Salahuddin Tirmizi
