= Nawabzada Salahuddin Saeed =

Pakistani politician

Nawab Salahuddin Saeed Khan Tanoli Chief Of Tanawal Nawab of Amb State

Member National Assembly of Pakistan
- In office 1985–1999
- President: Gen. Zia ul Haq; Ghulam Ishaq Khan; Farooq Laghari; Rafeeq Tarrar
- Prime Minister: Muhammad Khan Junejo; Benazir Bhutto; Mian Muhammad Nawaz Sharif

Personal details
- Born: 18 August 1958 (age 68) Shergarh Amb State, Pakistan
- Party: Independent

Nawab Salahuddin Saeed Khan Tanoli Nawab of former princely State of Amb, is a Pakistani politician and chief of Tanoli tribe. He was elected to the National Assembly five times between 1985 and 1997 as an independent and candidate from different parties.

He is the current Nawab of former Princely Amb State. He has been quite active in Pakistani Politics. These days, he is not affiliated with any political party.

== See also ==
- State of Amb
- State of Phulra
- Painda Khan Tanoli
- Nawab Khan Zaman Khan
