= Mufti Kifayatullah =

Pakistani Islamic scholar and politician

Mufti Kifayat Ullah
- کفایت اللہ

Member of the Provincial Assembly of Khyber Pakhtunkhwa
- In office 2008–2013
- Constituency: PK-55 (Mansehra-III)
- Prime Minister: Yusuf Raza Gillani

Personal details
- Party: JUI (F)
- Education: B.A.; M.A. Political science; Mufti Course

Mufti Kifayatullah Swati (Urdu: مفتی کفایت اللہ سواتی) (1963 – 28 August 2025) was a Pakistani Islamic scholar and senior politician of Jamiat Ulema-e-Islam (F). He also served as member of the Khyber Pakhtunkhwa Assembly from 2008 to 2013 and a member of the Pashtun National Jirga (PNJ).

In December 2024, Swati, along with Malik Naseer Kokikhel Afridi and Mufti Munir Shakir, led a delegation of the Pashtun Jirga to Kurram District to mediate a Shia–Sunni conflict between two groups of Pashtuns tribes.

On 28 August 2025, he died from injuries sustained from a shooting by his son on 16 August 2025.

== Political career ==
Kifayatullah was elected as MPA representing PK-38 Mansehra-III in the Khyber Pakhtunkhwa Assembly (2008–2013). He took office on 28 March 2008. He served on various standing committees, including Information, Transport and Housing.

He served as the party's Mansehra District chief until his suspension in January 2020, following violations of party discipline and alignment with activities contrary to party policies.

== Legal challenges and arrests ==
In September 2015, Kifayatullah was arrested by the Counter Terrorism Department (CTD) following inflammatory speeches at a religious event, which reportedly included statements against state institutions.

He was detained in October 2019 under the Maintenance of Public Order (MPO) by authorities following criticisms, qualified as “anti-state remarks” and allegedly maligning the Pakistan Army. He was released on bail by the Peshawar High Court in November 2019.

In January 2020, JUI-F suspended him as Mansehra District chief, citing “violating party discipline” and “activities against party policy.” A three-member internal committee was formed to investigate.

He was arrested in April 2021 over his statements against the Pakistan Army and then released on bail in July. His family members were also initially detained during the raid.

== 2019 beating ==
On 27 November 2019, Kifayatullah, along with his sons and a companion, was attacked near Mansehra Interchange while traveling from Islamabad. Their vehicle was rammed, and they were dragged out and beaten with iron rods. The attackers fled, and the victims were rushed to King Abdullah Teaching Hospital in Mansehra.

The family's account framed the assault as a “message” for his public speeches. The FIR cited multiple criminal sections, including attempted murder and rioting.

== Death ==
On 28 August 2025, he died from injuries sustained from a shooting by a son on 16 August 2025; another son and a daughter also died while his wife was critically injured.

== See also ==
- List of Deobandis
