= Ghulam Ghaus Hazarvi =

Pakistani Islamic scholar and politician

MNA Mawlānā Ghulam Ghaus Hazarvi
- غلام غوث ہزاروی

Member of the National Assembly of Pakistan
- In office 1972–1977
- Constituency: NA-6

Personal details
- Born: 1896 Baffa, Hazara, British India (now Mansehra District, Khyber Pakhtunkhwa, Pakistan)
- Died: 4 February 1981 (aged 84–85)
- Party: Jamiat Ulema-e-Islam (JUI)
- Occupation: Politician

Personal life
- Education: Darul Uloom Deoband; Mazahir Uloom Saharanpur

Religious life
- Denomination: Sunni

Mawlānā Ghulam Ghaus Hazarvi (1896 – 4 February 1981) was a Pakistani Islamic scholar and politician and a member of the National Assembly of Pakistan from 1972 to 1977.
