= Sardar Muhammad Yousuf =

Pakistani politician

Sardar Muhammad Yousuf Gujjar
- سردارمحمدیوسف گجر

Minister for Religious Affairs and Inter-faith Harmony
- Incumbent
- Assumed office 7 March 2025
- President: Asif Ali Zardari
- Prime Minister: Shehbaz Sharif
- Preceded by: Chaudhry Salik Hussain
- In office 4 August 2017 – 31 May 2018
- President: Mamnoon Hussain
- Prime Minister: Shahid Khaqan Abbasi
- In office 8 June 2013 – 28 July 2017
- President: Mamnoon Hussain
- Prime Minister: Nawaz Sharif
- Preceded by: Shazada Muhammad Saleem

Member of the National Assembly of Pakistan
- Incumbent
- Assumed office 29 February 2024
- Constituency: NA-14 Mansehra
- In office 1 June 2013 – 31 May 2018
- Constituency: NA-20 (Mansehra-I)

Member of the Provincial Assembly of Khyber Pakhtunkhwa
- In office 3 November 1990 – 12 October 1999
- Constituency: NA-14 (Mansehra-I)
- In office 13 August 2018 – 18 January 2023
- Constituency: PK-33 (Mansehra-IV)

Personal details
- Party: PMLN (2013-present)
- Other political affiliations: PML(Q) (1992-2013); PMLN (1997-1992); IND (1988-1993)
- Children: Sardar Shahjahan Yousuf

Sardar Muhammad Yousuf Gujjar (Urdu: سردار محمد یوسف گجر) is a Pakistani politician who is the current Minister for Religious Affairs and Interfaith Harmony, having previously served in the same position in the Abbasi cabinet from August 2017 to May 2018 and in the third Sharif ministry from 2013 to 2017.

== Political career ==
Yousuf was elected to the Provincial Assembly of Khyber Pakhtunkhwa for the first time in the 1985 Pakistani general election. His father was a tenant of the Khans of Battal. Later he adopted the title of Sardar and joined politics.

He ran for the seat of the Provincial Assembly of Khyber Pakhtunkhwa as an independent candidate from Constituency PF-45 (Mansehra-IV) in the 1988 Pakistani general election, but was unsuccessful. He received 9,811 votes and lost the seat to an independent candidate, Faiz Muhammad Khan. In the same election, he ran for the seat of the National Assembly of Pakistan from Constituency NA-16 (Mansehra-III) as a candidate of the Pakistan Peoples Party but was unsuccessful.

He was re-elected to the Provincial Assembly of Khyber Pakhtunkhwa as an independent candidate from Constituency PF-45 (Mansehra-IV) in the 1990 Pakistani general election and defeated Faiz Muhammad Khan. In the same election, he was elected to the National Assembly as an independent candidate from Constituency NA-14 (Mansehra-I). He received 34,787 votes and defeated a candidate of Jamiat Ulema-e Islam (F) (JUI-F). After winning he joined Pakistan Muslim League (N) (PML-N).

He ran for the seat of the Provincial Assembly of Khyber Pakhtunkhwa as an independent candidate from Constituency PF-45 (Mansehra-IV) in 1993 Pakistani general election, but was unsuccessful. He received 486 votes and lost the seat to an independent candidate, Haq Nawaz Khan. In the same election, he was re-elected to the National Assembly as a candidate of PML-N from Constituency NA-14 (Mansehra-I). He received 58,191 votes and defeated a candidate of Pakistan Muslim League (J).

He was elected to the National Assembly as a candidate of PML-N from Constituency NA-14 (Mansehra-I) in 1997 Pakistani general election. He received 46,918 votes and defeated a candidate of JUI-F.

He served as District Nazim of Mansehra District.

He left PML-N to join Pakistan Muslim League (Q) (PML-Q) after 1999 Pakistani coup d'état.

He could not run in the 2002 Pakistani general election and again in 2008 Pakistani general election because of the graduation degree bar.

In early 2013, he left PML-Q to join the PML-N.

He was re-elected to the National Assembly as a candidate of PML-N from Constituency NA-20 (Mansehra-I) in the 2013 Pakistani general election. Upon PML-N victory in the Pakistani general election, 2013, he was appointed Minister for Religious Affair and Interfaith Harmony in the third Sharif ministry.

He had ceased to hold ministerial office in July 2017 when the federal cabinet was disbanded following the resignation of Prime Minister Nawaz Sharif after Panama Papers case decision. Following the election of Shahid Khaqan Abbasi as Prime Minister of Pakistan, Yousaf was inducted into the federal cabinet of Abbasi and was appointed Minister for Religious Affairs for the second time. Upon the dissolution of the National Assembly on the expiration of its term on 31 May 2018, Yousuf ceased to hold the office as Federal Minister for Religious Affairs and Interfaith Harmony.

He was re-elected to Provincial Assembly of Khyber Pakhtunkhwa as a candidate of PML-N from Constituency PK-34 (Mansehra-V) in the 2018 Pakistani general election.

Political offices
Preceded by Syed Khurshid Ahmed Shah	Minister for Religious Affairs and Interfaith Harmony; 2013—present	Incumbent
