= Mansehra =

Mansehra: مانسہرہ (Northern Hindko); مانسهره (Pashto)
- City
- Mansehra
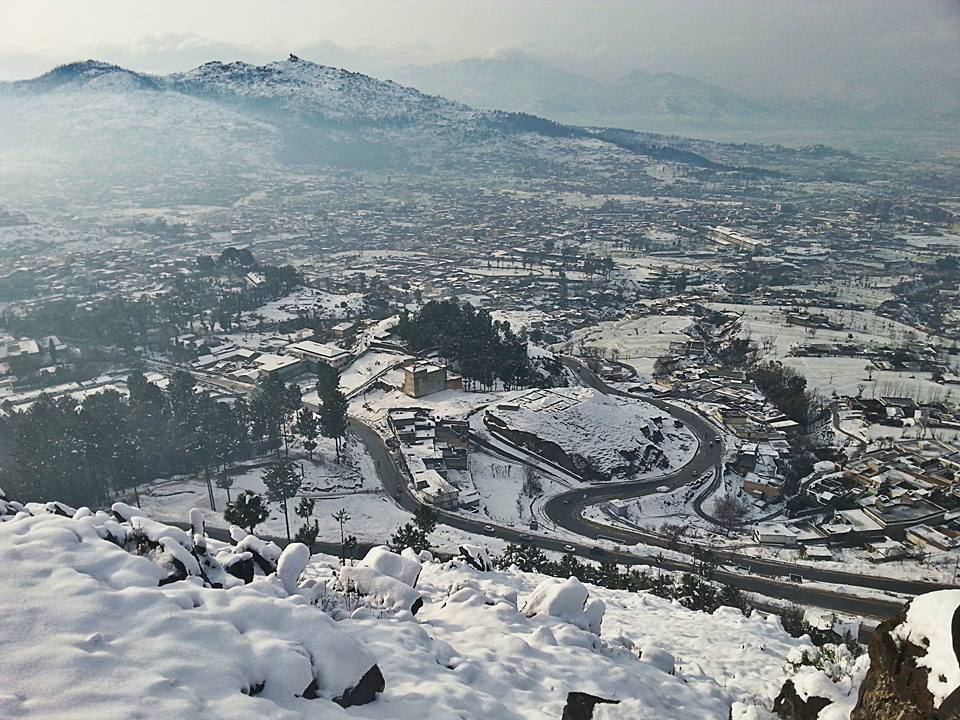
- Mansehra after winter snowfall

- Location of Mansehra Mansehra (Pakistan)
- Coordinates: 34°20′2″N 73°12′5″E
- Country: Pakistan
- Province: Khyber Pakhtunkhwa
- District: Mansehra
- Tehsil: Mansehra

Government
  - Type: Tehsil Municipal Administration
  - Body: TMA Mansehra
  - TMO: Malik Firasat Awan
- Elevation: 1,088 m (3,570 ft)

Population (2023)
  - City: 137,278
  - Rank: 87th in Pakistan
  - Density: 340/km^{2} (880/sq mi)
- Demonym: Mansehri or Mansehrian
- Time zone: UTC+5 (PST)
- Postal Code: 21300

Mansehra (Urdu, Hindko: مانسہرہ) is a city of the Hazara Division in Khyber Pakhtunkhwa province, Pakistan. It is the 87th most populous city in the country and the 7th most populous in the province, and serves as the headquarter of its namesake tehsil and district.

== History ==
=== Ancient period ===
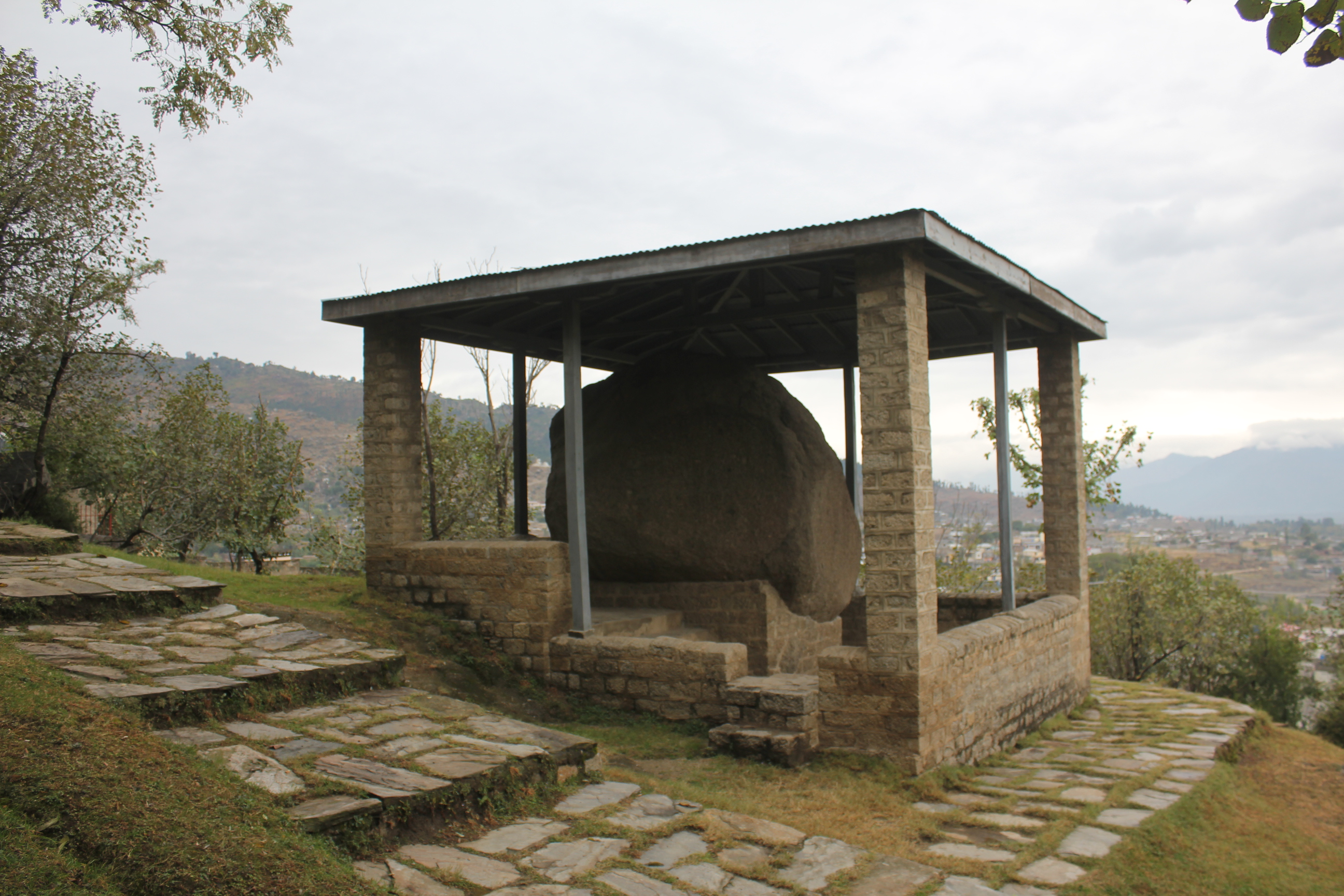
Ashokan inscriptions: Major Rock Edicts 1 to 14.

The region around the present-day city of Mansehra was inhabited by the ancient Indo-Aryans since the 3rd millennium BC, and was later a part of the ancient Gandhara Kingdom and the Mauryan Empire. Ashoka governed this area as a prince on the imperial throne in c. 272 BCE. He made it one of the major seats of his government. The Edicts of Ashoka, inscribed on three large boulders near Mansehra record fourteen of Ashoka's edicts, presenting aspects of the emperor's dharma or righteous law. These represent some of the earliest evidence of deciphered writing in the subcontinent, dating to the middle of the third century BCE, and are written from right to left in the Kharosthi script. Mauryans were followed by a variety of kingdoms, including Kushans, whose most notable ruler, Kanishka the Great, ruled from the nearby city of Puruṣapura. During this period Buddhist art and architecture flourished in the area.

=== Medieval period ===
The Uḍi Śāhis were the last great Gandharan dynasty before the Muslim conquest of Gandhara. They were notable for their impressive coinage and architecture, and built a series of temples in the region. They remained in control of the area until their defeat at Peshawar by the Ghaznavids in the year 1001. The region was originally known as Pakhli; it came to be known as Hazara only after Timurid invasion in 1399, when Tamerlane assigned it to his local chieftains, namely the Hazara-i-Karlugh, after whom the name of Hazara Division is derived. Hazara region comprised Pakhli sarkar of the Mughal province of Kashmir, and was administered so until the Durrani invasions by Ahmad Shah Durrani in the early 18th century, which resulted into anarchy and severe economic decline. The area was divided among several petty tribal chieftaincies in the following decades, and remained so until the conquest by the Sikhs in 1818.

=== Modern period ===
Hari Singh Nalwa, a Sikh commander of Ranjit Singh, conquered the Hazara region in 1818 by defeating the local chieftains. He governed Hazara from the newly-established city of Haripur, named after him. After his death in 1837, Hari Singh was succeeded by Mahan Singh Hazarawala as the Nazim of Hazara, who founded the modern city of Mansehra. The Sikhs remained in power until 1849, when the area came under British rule.

The British East India Company conquered Mansehra after the defeat of the Sikhs in the first Anglo-Sikh War in 1846. The British divided Hazara region into three tehsils (administrative subdivisions): Mansehra, Abbottabad, and Haripur. Hazara formed part of Punjab Province until 1901, when the British formed the buffer province of North West Frontier Province (NWFP) and Hazara was annexed into it. During the British rule, Mansehra was a small town. Its population according to the 1901 census was 5,087.

On 8th of June 1847 James Abbott, who would later become First Deputy Commissioner of Hazara, noted in his journal:

"Marched to Maunseera, 16 miles (from Nawan Shehr). Found a regiment of Jumboo troops in the town, quartering themselves not only in the bunnias' shops but in the houses and amongst the women of the unfortunate inhabitants. The troops have no tents, had brought no cooking utensils, and of course were exercising the right which might confers to make use of the zenanas and cooking utensils of their fellow-subjects. Can it be wondered that any people possessing means of resistance should revolt against such tyranny?"

After the independence, Hazara district was elevated to the divisional status in 1976. In the October of the same year Mansehra Tehsil was made district and Mansehra became its headquarters.

== Organisation ==
Mansehra City is the administrative capital of District and Tehsil Mansehra. The City of Mansehra is administratively divided into four Union Councils: Mansehra City Wards No. 1–4 and Mansehra (Rural)/suburban. Each union council is divided into Mohallas.

== Demographics ==
Population

Historical population

Year	Pop.	±% p.a.
1951	6,513	—
1961	11,848	+6.17%
1972	19,865	+4.81%
1981	27,843	+3.82%

Year	Pop.	±% p.a.
1998	49,534	+3.45%
2017	127,623	+5.11%
2023	137,278	+1.22%

According to the 2023 census, Mansehra had a population of 137,278 which was an increase of 1.22% since the 2017 census, table below shows details from the first census in 1951 and onwards.

Languages

Languages of Mansehra City (2023)
1. Hindko (79.4%)
2. Pashto (11.0%)
3. Urdu (5.91%)
4. Others (3.71%)

According to the 2023 Census of Pakistan, Mansehra City has a predominantly Hindko-speaking population, with Hindko spoken by 79.42% of residents. Pashto is the second most common first language, accounting for 10.96% of the population, followed by Urdu at 5.91%. While an additional 3.71% of the city spoke Other languages (mostly Punjabi and Shina).

=== Religion ===
Religious groups in Mansehra City (1931−2017) (Note: 1931-1941: Data for the entirety of the town of Mansehra, which included Mansehra Municipality.)
Religious group	1931		1941		2017	
Religious group	Pop.	%	Pop.	%	Pop.	%
Islam	4,217	72.96%	8,141	79.68%	144,838	99.96%
Hinduism (Note: 1931-1941: Including Ad-Dharmis)	1,091	18.88%	1,699	16.63%	2	0%
Sikhism	469	8.11%	375	3.67%	—N/a	—N/a
Christianity	3	0.05%	2	0.02%	39	0.03%
Jainism	0	0%	—N/a	—N/a	—N/a	—N/a
Zoroastrianism	0	0%	0	0%	—N/a	—N/a
Judaism	0	0%	0	0%	—N/a	—N/a
Buddhism	0	0%	—N/a	—N/a	—N/a	—N/a
Ahmadiyya	—N/a	—N/a	—N/a	—N/a	0	0%
Others	0	0%	0	0%	19	0.01%
Total population	5,780	100%	10,217	100%	144,898	100%

== Cultural festival ==
The city hosts the Mansehra Shiva Temple, which is known for its annual Shivarathri festival. During the festival of Durgashtami, held in the first month of the Hindu calendar and the seventh month of the Nanakshahi calendar, about 400 local Hindus assembled on Bareri Hill to worship Devi (as Durga). Offerings were taken by a Brahmin of Mansehra. The assembly on each occasion lasted only one day. The site is ancient, as at the base of Bareri Hill are the boulders inscribed with the Edicts of Ashoka.

Hashri is a traditional annual grass-cutting festival of Manshera, historically associated with the lineage of 3rd Khan of Mansehra, Zaman Khan Jahangiri Swati. As a Jagirdar, his estates organized such festivals annually where tenants and villagers collectively cut grass, accompanied by Dhol (drum) music. The custom reflected both agricultural cooperation and social structure of the time. His descendants, now settled as Khans across different neighborhoods of the city, have continued to preserve this tradition as part of Mansehra’s cultural heritage.

== Gallery ==
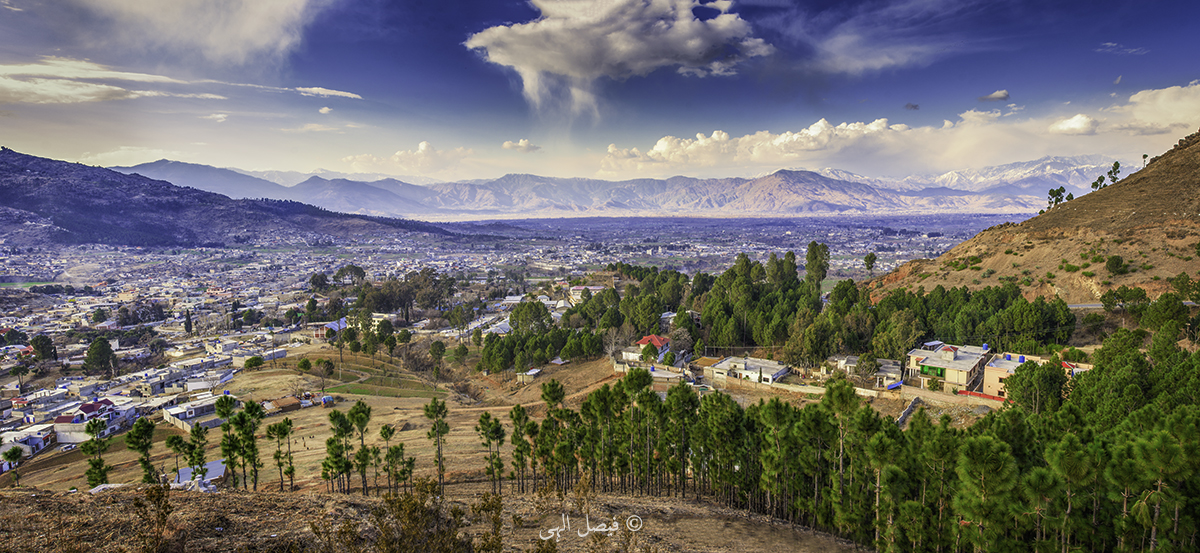
Northern parts of Mansehra city

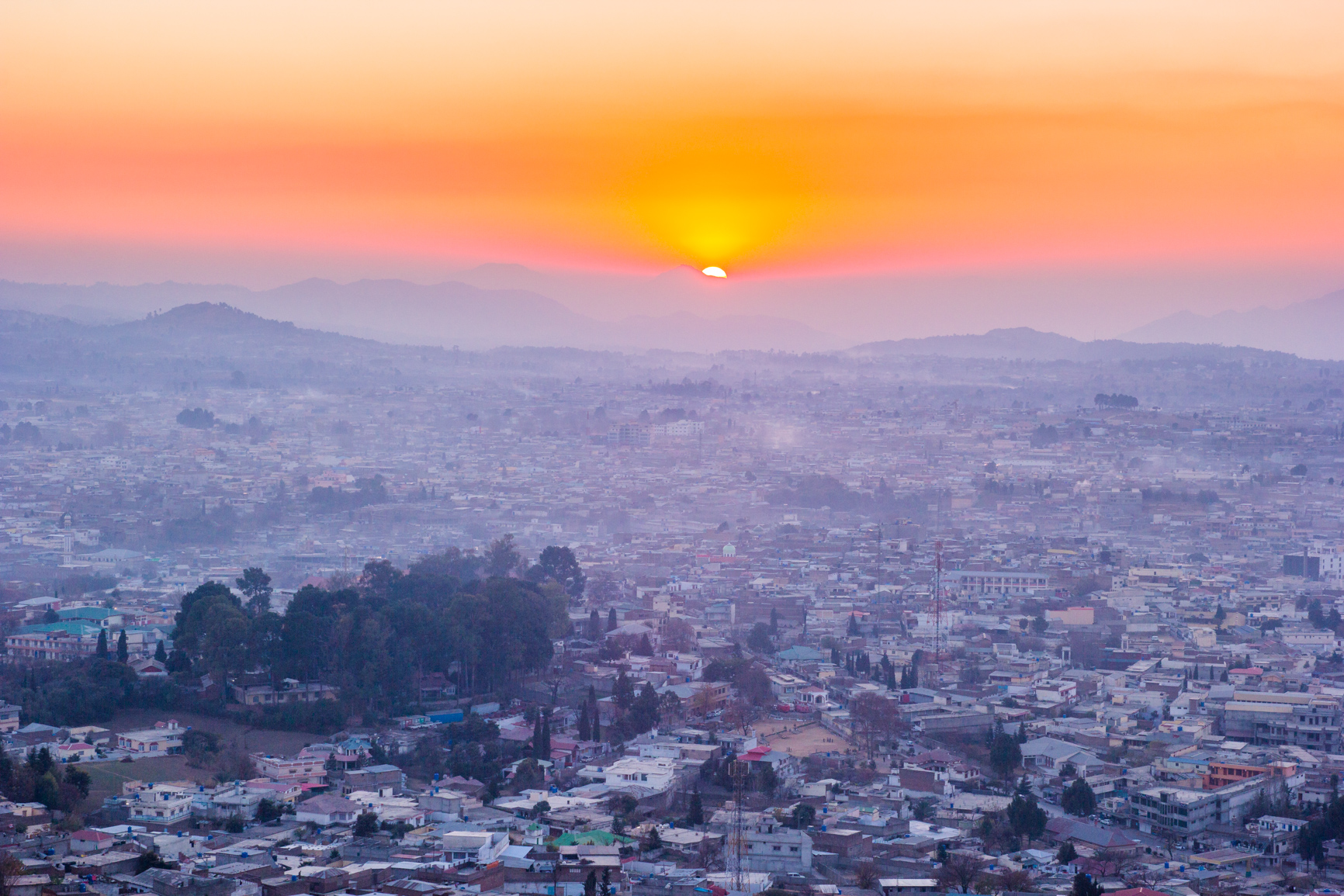
Sunset in Mansehra City

== See also ==
- Balakot
- Battangi
- Kaghan Valley
