= List of lakes of Pakistan =

Pakistan is home to many natural and man-made lakes and reservoirs. The largest lake in Pakistan, and also one of the largest in South Asia, is the Manchar Lake. The lake is spread over an area of over 260 square kilometres (100 square miles).

The highest lakes in Pakistan are the Paristan Lake and the two Shimshal Lakes, all three of which are at an altitude of over 4,755 metres (15,600 ft). The second-highest lake in Pakistan is the Karambar Lake, which is located at an altitude of 4,272 metres (14,016 ft), is the 33rd highest lake in the world. A recent Google map analysis revealed more than 500 lakes in northern Pakistan (mainly in Gilgit-Baltistan and Chitral region). Many of these lakes are still nameless and undiscovered to even the local population.

== Natural lakes ==
=== Gilgit-Baltistan ===
Name	Image	Elevation	Location	Description	Ref.
Attabad Lake		2,363.2 metres (7,753 ft)	Attabad, Gojal Tehsil, Hunza District 36°20′12.62″N 74°52′3.12″E	With the area of about 13.5 square km it the largest lake of Gilgit-Baltistan. Also known as Hunza Lake the lake was created in January 2010 due to massive landslides blocking Hunza River.	
Barah Lake		4,512 metres (14,803 ft)	Barah Valley, Ghanche District 35.095989°N 76.233240°E	Barah lake referred to two lakes in the mountain of Barah town. The area of this lake is 0.21 km^{2}	
Bashkiri Lake I (Satrangi Lake)		3,214.7 metres (10,547 ft)	Naltar Valley, Gilgit District 36°13′53.09″N 74°06′23.73″E	One of the four major alpine lakes of Naltar Valley. It is the most prominent and the largest lakes of the valley. The name 'Satrangi' means 'seven-colored' in Urdu, so called because of the many shades of blue and green visible on the surface of the lake due to the moss, aquatic plants and roots of the trees in and around the lake.	
Batura Lake		2,900 metres (9,500 ft)	Batura Valley, Hunza District	The Lake lies in the Upper Hunza region of Gilgit-Baltistan in Pakistan. It is just north of the massifs of Batura, at 7,795 metres (25,574 ft), and Passu, at 7,500 metres (24,600 ft). The glacier flows west to east.	
Borith Lake		2,600 metres (8,500 ft)	Borith, Gojal Tehsil, Hunza District 36.430863°N 74.862773°E	Borith Lake is a saline water lake, located to the north of Ghulkin Glacier in a village near Hussaini, Gojal Tehsil, in the upper Hunza.	
Dakholi Lake		4,771.1 metres (15,653 ft)	Khaplu Valley, Ghanche District 35.06417°N 76.37815°E	Area of Dakholi Lake as calculated by QT at ArcGIS Esri is 0.07 km^{2} as of September 2020.	
Darkush Lake		around 3,352.8 metres (11,000 ft)	Nagar Valley, Nagar District		
Dirlay Lake		2,747.0 metres (9,012.5 ft)	Astore Valley, Astore District 35.0485434°N 74.828608°E		
Ghanche Lake		4,599.9 metres (15,092 ft)	Khaplu Valley, Ghanche District 35.07457°N 76.29370°E	Ghanche lake is the source of ghanche stream that waters khaplu town. The area of Ghanche Lake calculated by Arc GIS as of September 2020 by QT is 0.16 km^{2}.	
Ghorashe Lake		2,862.2 metres (9,390 ft)	Kharmang Valley, Kharmang District 34.98489°N 76.20958°E		
Handarap Lake		3,285 metres (10,778 ft)	Shandoor, Ghizer District 36.068°N 72.546°E	Also known as Shandoor Lake.	
Hasanabad Lake		2,750 metres (9,020 ft)	Hassanabad Valley, Hunza District	Hasanabad lake also known as Shispare lake, located in Hassanbad valley off Hunza, formed due to blockage of Shispare Glacier, thus forming a lake having 1.4 km in length. The area of this lake is 0.35 km^{2}( growing day by day). It is 2 hours hike from hassanabad bridge, from where you can go to Batura (7795m), Shispare (7611m), Muchu Chhish (7452m) and many other 7000m mountains.	
Hrkolong Lake		4,126 metres (13,537 ft)	Khaplu Valley, Ghanche District 35.08440°N 76.35653°E	Hrkolong lake is the source of Hnajuluba stream that waters khaplu, Surmo and youchung broq (high steppes fields).	
Khalti Lake		2,227.8 metres (7,309 ft)	Khalti, Ghizer District 36.2479302°N 73.3633701°E		
Katpanah Lake		2,190 metres (7,190 ft)	Katpanah, Skardu District 35.3160556°N 75.5784722°E	The only lake in Skardu city.	
Naltar Lakes		between 3,214.8 metres (10,547 ft) and 3,268.5 metres (10,723 ft)	Naltar Valley, Gilgit District	These are at least seven lakes in the valley. The major lake is called 'Satrangi Lake, meaning seven-colored Lake.	
Naqpo Rzingbo		4,094.8 metres (13,434 ft)	Tormik Valley, Rondu District 35°39′31.35″N 75°14′19.09″E	A remote lake high up in the Tormik Valley at an elevation of over 4,000 meters. It is accessible only by a half a day of trekking from the village of Dunsa in the valley below. The name means 'black lake' in the Balti language.	
Lower Kachura Lake		2,500 metres (8,200 ft)	Kachura, Skardu District 35°25′40″N 75°27′16″E	The lake is also known as Shangrila Lake and is located at a drive of about 20 minutes from Skardu town. Shangrila was named after a book titled Lost Horizon by James Hilton. Shangri-la is a Chinese word meaning "Heaven on earth".	
Paristan Lake		4,767 metres (15,640 ft)	Skardu Valley, Skardu District 35.4065°N 72.4138°E		
Phander Lake		2,907.6 metres (9,539 ft)	Phander, Gupis-Yasin District 36.173123°N 72.9472983°E		
Rama Lake		2,600 metres (8,500 ft)	Rama, Astore District 35°19′51″N 74°47′8″E	Rama Lake is located nine kilometers away from the valley of Astore in Northern Areas.	
Rush Lake		4,693 metres (15,397 ft)	Nagar Valley, Nagar District 36°7′50″N 74°55′57″E	Rush Lake is a high altitude lake located near Rush Pari Peak. At over 4,694 meters, Rush is the highest lake in Pakistan and one of the highest alpine lakes in the world. It is located about 15 km north of Miar Peak and Spantik (Golden Peak), which are in the Nagar valley.	
Satpara Lake		2,636 metres (8,648 ft)	Satpara, Skardu District 35°14′2″N 75°37′53″E	Satpara Lake is located in Skardu Valley and is one of the (Area=4.5square km, 2nd largest of gilgit baltistan)largest fresh water lakes in Pakistan. It supplies water for the town of Skardu.	
Sheosar Lake		4,142 metres (13,589 ft)	Deosai Plains, Skardu District 34°59′30.35″N 75°14′43.42″E	Sheosar Lake is situated in the Deosai Plateau, which is one of the highest plateaus of the world.	
Shimshal Lakes		4,755 metres (15,600 ft)	Shimshal Valley, Gojal Tehsil, Hunza District	There are 2 lakes an elevation of 4,755 metres (15,600 ft), making them the second highest lakes in Pakistan. The lakes are locally known as big lake and small lake in the Wakhi language. These lakes are almost 5 days trekking from the Shimshal village and lie in the region of Pamir, which is very close to the Chinese border with Pakistan. Almost the entirety of Shimshal valley is crossed to reach them, including passing through Shimshal pass at over 4,700 meters before Shuwerth.	
Upper Kachura Lake		2,500 metres (8,200 ft)	Kachura, Skardu District 35°26′48″N 75°26′44″E	The lake is surrounded with wild apricot gardens and has a depth of around 70 meters. Due to rough terrain of the surrounding area, this lake is not well explored.	
Karambar Lake		4,272 metres (14,016 ft)	Broghil Valley, Ghizer District 36°53′03.26″N 73°42′44.03″E	Karambar Lake is the 33rd highest lakes in the world. The approximate length of the lake is 3.9 km, width is 2 km and, average depth is 52m.	
Zharba Lake		2,500 metres (8,200 ft)	Shigar Valley, Shigar District	The only lake in Shigar valley.	

=== Azad Kashmir ===
Name	Image	Elevation	Location	Description	Ref.
Saral Lake		4,100 metres (13,500 ft)	Neelam Valley 34.96282°N 74.099773°E	This lake can be accessed from Sharda, Neelam valley and Kaghan Valley.	
Baghsar Lake		975 metres (3,199 ft)	Samahni Valley, Bhimber District 33°2′42″N 74°11′50″E	The lake is nearly half a kilometer long and overlooks the Bandala Valley.	
Chitta Katha Lake		3,962 metres (12,999 ft)	Shonter Valley 34°55′8″N 74°31′17″E	Chitta Katha Lake is located in Shounter Valley of Azad Kashmir.	
Ganga Lake			Bagh District		
Ratti Gali Lake		3,700 metres (12,100 ft)	Neelam Valley 34.8302°N 74.0613°E	The lake is accessible from Dowarian by a 19 kilometers (12 mi) hiking trek. Dowarian is the base camp to this lake.	
Shonter Lake			Neelum Valley 34°58′23″N 74°30′46″E	This is a small lake located in the Azad Kashmir.	
Subri Lake			Muzaffarabad 34.324°N 73.520°E	Subri lake, also known as Langarpura Lake, is situated 10 kilometers out of Muzaffarabad, where the Jhelum River widens to form the lake.	

=== Punjab ===
Name	Image	Elevation	Location	Description	Ref.
Swaik Lake			Khandowa Village Kallar Kahar Tehsil, Chakwal District 36°20′12.62″N 74°52′3.12″E	Swaik Lake also known as Khandowa Lake is a lake situated at 10 km from the Tehsil Kallar Kahar, Chakwal District and 30 kilometers southwest of Chakwal along the motorway.	
Namal Lake			Mianwali 32.689597°N 71.806763°E	Namal Lake is located in Namal Valley, in Mianwali. The lake is spread over an area of 5.5 km^{2} and was built in 1913 after the construction of Namal Dam.	
Uchhali Lake		1,522 metres (4,993 ft)	Soan Sakaser Valley, Salt Range 32°33′25″N 72°1′31″E	The lake is located in the southern salt range and has brackish water.	
Kallar Kahar			Chakwal District 32°47′N 72°42′E	The salt water lake is located near Salt Range in Chakwal District, 125 km from Rawalpindi.	
Jahlar Lake		828 metres (2,717 ft)	Soon Valley 32°29′53.26″N 72°5′15.19″E	Jahlar Lake is part of Uchhali Wetland Complex in Soon Valley	
Khabikki Lake			Khushab District 32.621882°N 72.21355°E	It is a salt water lake located in the southern Salt Range. The lake is named after a nearby village, Khabikki.	

=== Sindh ===
Name	Image	Elevation	Location	Description	Ref.
Drigh Lake			Qambar Shahdadkot District, Sindh 27.568°N 67.930°E	Drigh Lake is Located in Qambar Shahdadkot District in Sindh, Pakistan, It is 29 km away from Larkana city and 7 km away from Qambar town.	
Shakoor Lake			Tharparkar District 24°15′28″N 69°04′20″E	Shakoor Lake is situated on the border between India and Pakistan, its area ranges from 300 square kilometres (120 sq mi)	
Manchar Lake		34 metres (112 ft)	Jamshoro District 26.4166°N 67.65°E	Lake Manchar is the largest freshwater lake in Pakistan and one of the largest in Asia. It is located west of the Indus River in Sindh. The area of the lake fluctuates with the seasons from as little as 350 km^{2} to 520 km^{2}. The lake collects water from numerous small streams in the Kirthar Mountains and empties into the Indus River.	
Hadero Lake			Thatta District 24°49′42″N 67°51′37″E	Hadero is a brackish water lake in Sindh. The lake was declared wildlife sanctuary in 1977. The lake has a surface area of 1321 hectares.	
Haleji Lake			Thatta District 24°48′10″N 67°46′38″E	The lake is located at about 70 km from Karachi and is the largest water fowl reserve in Asia.	
Hamal Lake			Qamber Shahdadkot District 27.449°N 67.632°E	Hamal Lake is located in Qamber Shahdadkot District in Sindh, Pakistan.	
Keenjhar Lake		21 metres (69 ft)	Thatta District 24°57′N 68°03′E	The lake is also called Kalri Lake and is one of the largest freshwater lakes in Pakistan. The Sindhi legend of Noori Jam Tamachi took place around the lake, and to this day there is a shrine in the middle of the lake marking Noori's grave.	

=== Balochistan ===
Name	Image	Elevation	Location	Description	Ref.
Hanna Lake		1,898 metres (6,227 ft)	Quetta District 30°15′N 67°06′E	Hanna Lake is located 10 km from Quetta, near Urak Valley in Balochistan.	

=== KPK ===
Name	Image	Elevation	Location	Description	Ref.
Bashkargol Lake		3,652 metres (11,982 ft)	Chitral Valley 35°54′45.72″N 72°19′59.83″E	Bashkargol Lake is a high-altitude lake (3,652 metres (11,982 ft)) located in the Laspur Valley in Upper Chitral District of Khyber Pakhtunkhwa. It is near Thalo Zom in the Hindukush range. Roughly 22 kilometer hike from the village of Sor Laspur.	
Pyala Lake		3,410 metres (11,190 ft)	Kaghan Valley 35°0′27.7524″N 73°56′28.8852″E	Pyala Lake is a very small lake besides the Kunhar River at Jalkhad. Since the lake looks more like a bowl Urde:Pyala (پیالہ) hence it is called Pyala Lake.	
Siri Lake		2,590 metres (8,500 ft)	Kaghan Valley 34.6312°N 73.4920°E	Siri Lake is situated near Shogran in Siri, on the way to Payee in Kaghan Valley, Pakistan.	
Spin Khwar Lake			Swat Valley		
Saiful Muluk		3,224 metres (10,577 ft)	Kaghan Valley 34°52′37.34″N 73°41′37.71″E	The lake is located in the northern end of Kaghan Valley. The lake has total surface area of over 2.5 square kilometer. The lake is famous for its fairytale of Saiful Maluk	
Dudipatsar Lake		3,800 metres (12,500 ft)	Kaghan Valley 35°1′6.6″N 74°5′22.2″E	The lake lies in the extreme north of Kaghan Valley at a height of 3,800 metres (12,500 ft). The term dudi in Urdu means white and sar means lake.	
Dudibach Sar			Kaghan Valley 35°1′0.12″N 74°4′59.88″E		
Mahodand Lake		2,900 metres (9,500 ft)	Kalam Valley 35.7138°N 72.6502°E	The lake is located 40 km from Kalam Valley in the valley of Ushu.	
Ansoo Lake		4,126 metres (13,537 ft)	Kaghan Valley 34°48′53.75″N 73°40′33.10″E	Ansoo Lake is a high-altitude lake (4,126 metres (13,537 ft)) located in the Kaghan Valley in Mansehra District of Khyber Pakhtunkhwa. It is near Malika Parbat in the Himalayan range.	
Kundol Lake		2,743 metres (8,999 ft)	Utror, Swat Valley 35°19′57″N 72°29′50″E	This lake is located in the north of Utror via Ladu valley.	
Lulusar Lake		3,410 metres (11,190 ft)	Kaghan Valley 35°0′8.04″N 73°9′2.66″E	The lake is the main source of the Kunhar River and has a baby lake beside it. The word "sar" means "lake" in Shina.	
Payee Lake		2,895 metres (9,498 ft)	Kaghan Valley 34.6153°N 73.4867°E	Payee Lake is located near Shogran in Payee, surrounded by the Makra Peak, Malika Parbat, and the mountains of Kashmir.	

== Artificial lakes and reservoirs ==
Name	Image	Elevation	Location	Description	Ref.
Banjosa Lake		1,981 metres (6,499 ft)	Poonch District, Azad Kashmir 33°48′38″N 73°48′59″E	Banjosa is an artificial lake and a tourist attraction near the city of Rawalakot in District Poonch in Azad Kashmir.	
Chotiari Lake			Sanghar District, Sindh 26.146°N 69.161°E	Chotiari Lake is an artificial water reservoir situated 35 km away from the Sanghar town in Sanghar District, Sindh.	
Hub Lake			Karachi and Lasbela District on Sindh and Balochistan border 25.280°N 67.129°E	Hub Lake is an artificial reservoir 56 km away from Karachi on Sindh and Balochistan border.	
Khanpur Lake			Khanpur, Khyber Pakhtunkhwa 28°64′91″N 70°65′14″E	It is situated in Khanpur village, 15 kilometres (9.3 mi) from Haripur. Famous for Water sports and Paragliding.	
Mangla Lake			Mirpur District, Azad Kashmir 33.199°N 73.751°E	Mangla Lake is an artificial reservoir near Mirpur city in Mirpur District, Azad Kashmir	
Rawal Lake			Islamabad 33.702675°N 73.126118°E	Rawal Lake is an artificial reservoir in Islamabad Capital Territory, Pakistan. The lake is spread over an area of 8.8 km^{2} and is one of the major sources of water for the residents of Islamabad and Rawalpindi. Rawal Lake is located within an isolated section of the Malpur village near Margalla Hills National Park.	
Simli Lake			Islamabad 33°44′5″N 73°20′5″E	Simli Lake is located 30 km from Islamabad. The lake is formed from the melting snow and natural springs of Murree Hills. Simli Lake is the largest drinking water source for the residents of Islamabad.	
Tanda Lake			Kohat, Khyber Pakhtunkhwa 33°35′13″N 71°26′32″E	Tanda Lake is formed from Tanda Dam in Kohat District on Toi River.	
Tarbela Lake			Haripur District, Khyber Pakhtunkhwa 34.133°N 72.808°E	Tarbela Lake is an artificial reservoir in the Haripur District of North-West Frontier Province. It is near Tarbela Township in the Tarbela range. The name of the lake comes from town of Tarbela in which it is located (Hindko Black Forest).	

== See also ==
- Tourism in Pakistan
  - Waterfalls in Pakistan
  - Hill stations in Pakistan
  - Valleys in Pakistan
