= Tofkian =

Tofkian توفکیاں Area Punj katta
- Town and union council
- Interactive map of Tofkian توفکیاں
- Coordinates: 33.7742°N 72.838°E
- Country: Pakistan
- Region: Khyber Pakhtunkhwa
- District: Haripur District
- Tehsil: Khanpur
- Division: Hazara, Khyber Pakhtunkhwa
- water supply irrigation: Khanpur Dam
- Elevation: 520 m (1,710 ft)

Population uc Tofkian
  - Total: 22,089
- year 2014
- Time zone: UTC+5 (PST)
- postal code Tofkian: 22650
- Area code: 0995

Tofkian valley (Urdu: توفكياں ويلى) is one of the largest 44 union councils, administrative subdivisions, of Haripur District in the Khyber Pakhtunkhwa province of Pakistan. Tofkian valley's famous educational and government organization cluster is located near Taxila Gardens and UET Taxila 5 km from Taxila and 9 km from Wah Cantonment, and 35 km (22 mi) to the north west of Rawalpindi/Islamabad and 42 km (26 mi) to Islamabad International Airport.

== U/C Tofkian village list ==
- Tofkian
- jandial
- Nashamin colony
- Taxila garden
- Mirpur Tofkian
- pind Gakhra
- Nikra
- Garian seydian
- sultanpur
- kohta
- bhera
- Mamrahal
- Julian
- Badialpur
- Marchabad

== Famous Frout and attractive places in U/C Tofkian ==
- Farm House wakefled Orange valley Tofkian
- Khanpur Dam
- sirsukh
- sirkap
- Taxila Museum
- Nikra Bangala

And famous Khanpuri Red Blood Orange loquat lychee etc.

== Education ==
- Govt Boy High school Tofkian
- Govt Girls High school Tofkian
- GPS Tofkian
- Govt Girl Middle school Tofkian
- University of Engineering And Technology Taxila
- Education city HITEC Taxila
- Govt Technically college Taxila

== Marriage Hall Facility ==
- Royal Haveli Marque Tofkian
- Red Rose Marquee Tofkian
- Royal son Hotel Taxila
- lasani marriage Hall Taxila

== U/C Tofkian Basic facilities ==
- Dariking water
- irrigation water
- Sui gass
- electricity
- Ptcl Exchange Tofkian

== sim Network services ==
All sim Networks 3G & 4G services available in Tofkian

- ufone
- zong
- Talenor
- jazz
- warid

== Health ==
- Basic Health unit Tofkian
- THQ Taxila
- THQ Khanpur
