= Ganga Lake =

Ganga Lake may refer to:

- Ganga Lake (Pakistan)
- Ganga Lake (India)
- Ganga Lake (Mongolia)
- Ganga Talao (Mauritius) - Also called Ganga lake and Grand Basin
