= Namık Kemal (disambiguation) =

Namık Kemal (1840–1888) was an Ottoman writer, political activist and journalist. It may also refer to:

- Namık Kemal Şentürk (1922–2020), Turkish politician
- Namık Kemal Yolga (1914–2001), Turkish diplomat
- Namık Kemal Zeybek (born 1944), Turkish politician
