= Bundala (disambiguation) =

Bundala is a village in Punjab, India.

Bundala may also refer to:

- Bundala National Park, National Park in Sri Lanka
- Bundala, Amritsar, a village in Amritsar District, Punjab, India

== See also ==
- Chak Bundala, a village in Jalandhar District, Punjab, India
- Bundela, a Rajput clan of India
