= Rajgan Mosque =

Mosque in Khanpur, Khyber Pakhtunkhwa, Pakistan

- راجگان مسجد
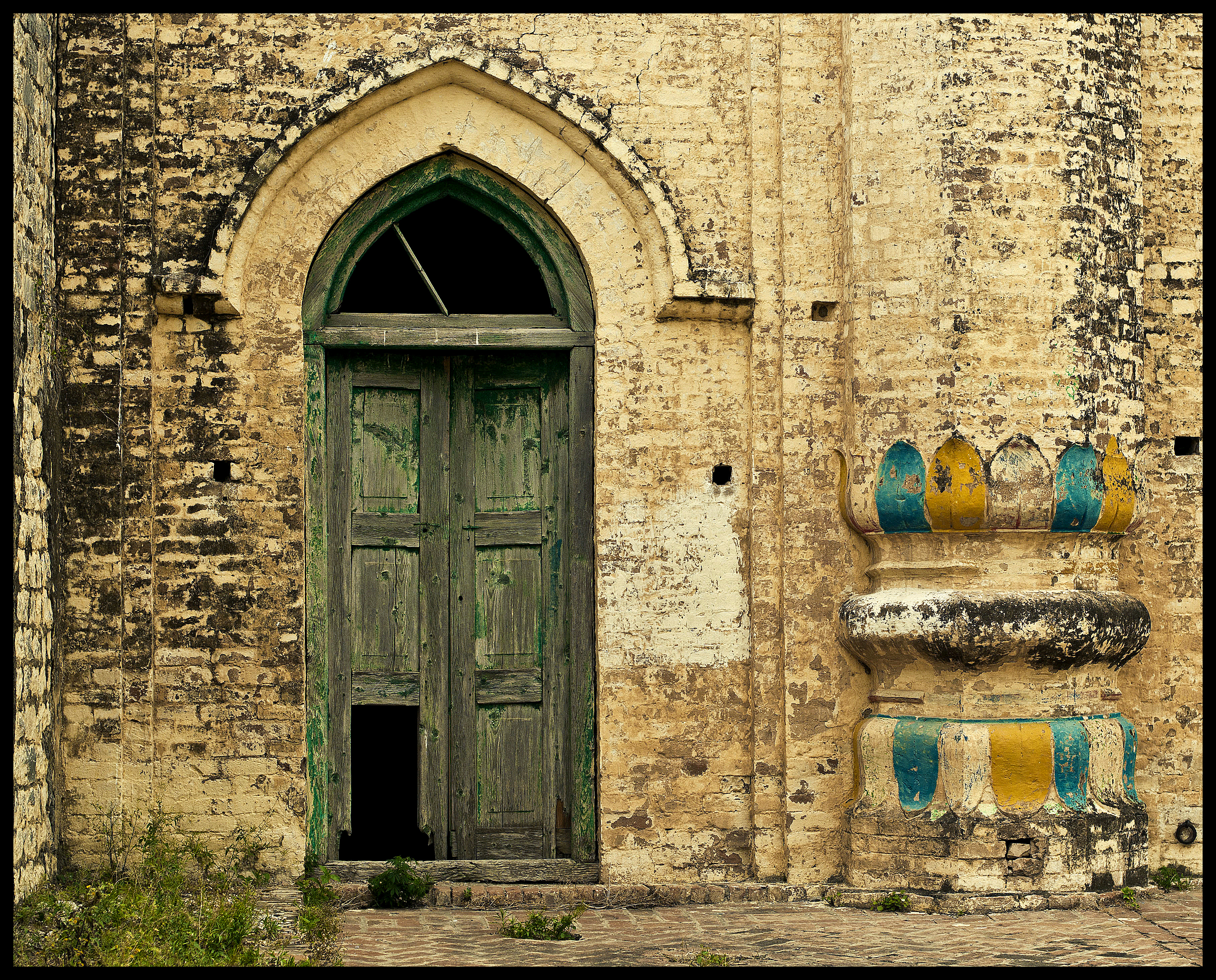

Religion
- Affiliation: Islam
- Status: Abandoned except for Eid prayers

Location
- Location: Khanpur, Khyber Pakhtunkhwa, Pakistan
- Interactive map of Rajgan Mosque
- Coordinates: 33°48′57.4″N 72°56′17.3″E

Architecture
- Type: Mosque
- Style: Mughal architecture
- Creator: Raja Sultan Jehandad Khan
- Established: 1872

Specifications
- Direction of façade: East
- Capacity: 1,000
- Minaret: 5
- Materials: Brick, stone, wood
- Elevation: 607 m (1,991 ft)

Rajgan Mosque (Urdu:راجگان مسجد) is a historic mosque located in Khanpur, Khyber Pakhtunkhwa, Pakistan. It is located at the northern edge of the Khanpur Dam reservoir. It is locally known as ‘Rajon ki Masjid’ (lit. 'Mosque of the Rajas'), and is usually deserted except for Eid congregations. It is a 90-minute drive (50.1 km) away from Islamabad.

== History ==
The mosque was built in 1872 by Raja Sultan Jehandad Khan, the grandfather of senior parliamentarian and former Chief Minister of NWFP, Raja Sikandar Zaman Khan. Raja Sultan was also the founder of the old Khanpur village which existed on the current site of the reservoir.

The mosque was a hub of religious activity in the area until the 1970s, when construction of the Khanpur Dam started, and other mosques were built nearby.

Nowadays, the mosque is usually surrounded by water from July to September when the Khanpur Lake is filled to the maximum conservation level. These damp conditions are not favorable for the mosque's structure. Moreover, the carved wooden doors have been stolen, enabling stray animals to enter at times. The adjacent graveyard is in a dismal state, and is scattered with old graves with many nameplates destroyed. Local shepherds house their cattle in the mosque basement on rainy days, and cow dung litters the area. There is no direct water supply at the mosque, but a water supply line and the ruins of washrooms and the house of the prayer leader can be seen adjacent to the mosque.

== Construction ==
Reportedly, architects of Islamic art were brought in from Delhi to construct this mosque. They used bricks and black stones as the main materials, while wood from Leepa Valley was imported for doors, cupboards, and the roof. The building follows the style of Islamic architecture, and, therefore, has four minarets (two big ones and two small ones). Another dome-shaped small minaret is located in the centre. It has a large prayer hall and a dilapidated brick courtyard which is in need of restoration and rehabilitation. It has a capacity of around 1,000 worshippers.

The mosque's four arched entrances and the main gate are replicas of the ones present in the Jama Masjid, Delhi, which was built by Mughal Emperor Shah Jahan between 1650 and 1656.

There is some dispute over the origins of the black stone used to construct the boundary wall, with some saying it was imported from India, and others claiming it came from the nearby city of Taxila.
