= Ansu =

Ansu may refer to:

- Ansu apricot, a common name for Prunus armeniaca
- Ansu, Hebei, a town in Xushui District, Hebei, China
- Ansoo Lake, a mountain lake in the Khyber-Pakhtunkhwa province of Pakistan
- Wanshū, a pattern of movements in karate
- *ansu-, the reconstructed root for the Germanic word Æsir
- Aansoo, a 2000 Pakistani TV drama
- Ansu Fati (born 2002), Spanish footballer
- Ansu Toure (born 1991), Liberian footballer
- Ansu Sesay (born 1976), American basketball player

== See also ==
- Ansus language, an Austronesian language of Indonesian New Guinea
- Ansuz (rune), a Germanic rune
- AMSU, the Advanced Microwave Sounding Unit
