= Baghsar Lake =

Lake in Azad Kashmir, Pakistan

Baghsar Lake باغ سر جھیل
- Location within Azad Kashmir Location within Pakistan Location within Kashmir
- Location: Samahni Valley
- Coordinates: 33°02′41.5″N 74°11′51.5″E
- Basin countries: Pakistan
- Max. length: 0.5 mi (0.80 km)
- Max. width: 0.115 km (0.071 mi)
- Average depth: 10–12 feet (3.0–3.7 m)
- Surface elevation: 975 metres (3,199 ft)

Baghsar Lake (Urdu: باغ سر جھیل) is a lake situated at 975 m above sea level in the Samahni Valley of Bhimber District in Azad Kashmir, Pakistan. The lake is roughly half a kilometre long and overlooks the Bandala Valley. The lake is a popular tourist destination.

Many local and migratory birds, especially ducks and geese, inhabit the lake. The lake is a habitat for water lilies, and the surrounding hills are covered with pine trees and lily flowers.

The area has several archaeological remains, as Bhimber lay on the route used by Mughal emperors travelling to the Kashmir Valley. The Baghsar Fort, built by the Mughals, is situated at 3353 feet above sea level. Mughal emperor Jahangir died on his way back from the Kashmir Valley near Sarai Sababad in 1627 AD. To preserve his body, the entrails were removed and buried here, and the body was later transported to Lahore.

The four-story granite structure of the fort played important roles in history during the times of Shah Jahan, Aurangzeb and Ahmed Shah Abdali. It is said that the Mughal emperor Jahangir, on his way back from the Kashmir Valley, fell ill and ultimately died near this fort.
