= Bashqar Gol Lake =

Bashqar Gol Lake بشقارگول جھیل
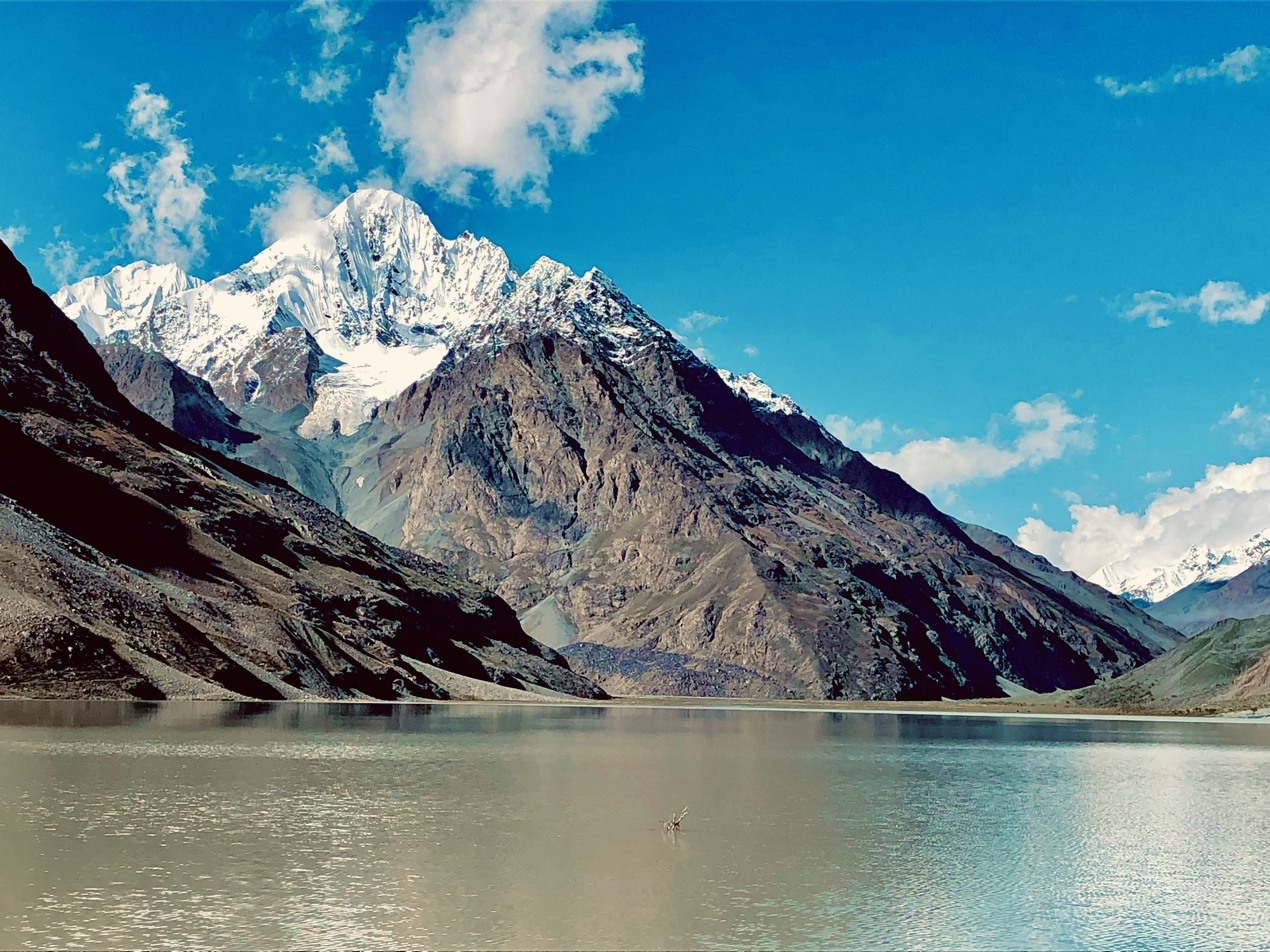
- Bashqar Gol Lake in Laspur Valley

- Location within Khyber Pakhtunkhwa Location within Pakistan
- Location: Laspur, Chitral Valley
- Coordinates: 35.91270°N 72.33604°E
- Lake type: Alpine/Glacial lake
- Primary inflows: Glaciers water
- Primary outflows: Laspur River
- Basin countries: Pakistan
- Max. length: 2 km (1.2 mi)
- Max. width: 1.3 km (0.81 mi)
- Surface area: 1.639 km^{2} (163.9 ha)
- Surface elevation: 3,679 m (12,070 ft)
- Settlements: Mastuj, Chitral, Chitral Valley

Bashqar Gol Lake (Urdu: بشقارگول جھیل; Khowar: بشقارگول چھت) is a high altitude alpine lake located in the Laspur valley of Upper Chitral District, about 170 kilometres (110 mi) from Chitral town, in the Khyber Pakhtunkhwa province of Pakistan. With a surface area of 1.639 km^{2} (0.633 sq mi), it is the 4th largest lake in northern Pakistan by surface area.

The path to the lake is accessible by four-wheel drive vehicles up to the village of Sor Laspur, followed by a 20-kilometer hike, and is often utilized for camping on the way to base camp of the Thalo Zom peak or to cross the Thalo Pass.

== Geography ==
The Bashkargol Lake lies at the foothills of the Hindu Kush mountains at an elevation of 3,679 m (12,070 ft), surrounded by meadows on its south, forest on its north, and mountains on its east and west. It covers an area of 200 ha (2.0 km^{2}). The Bashkargol lake is fed by melting glaciers and springs of the Hindu Kush mountain including the glaciers from Thalo Zom, Gochhar Sar and Kharakhali Peaks. The outlet from the lake gives rise to Laspur River, the major left tributary of the Chitral River which meets the Yarkhun River at the town of Mastuj to form the Mastuj River.

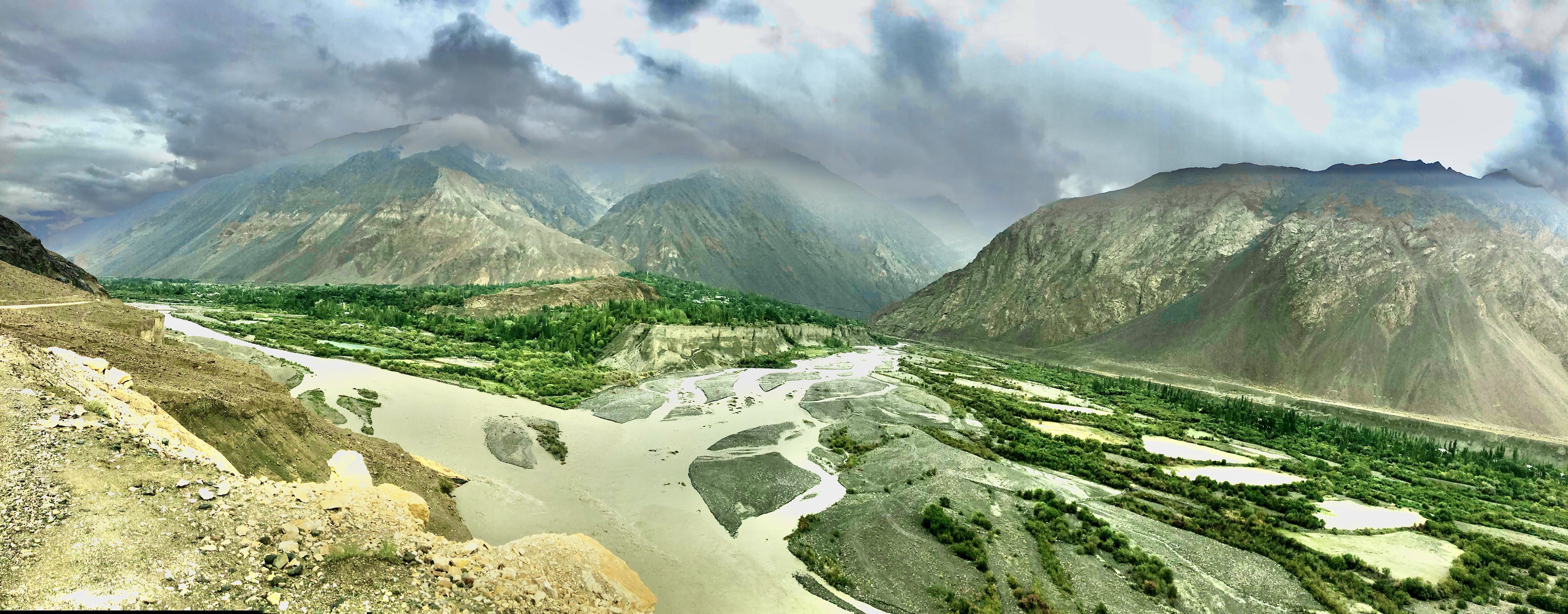
Confluence of Laspur River (right) and Yarkhun River (left) at Mastuj

== Flora and fauna ==
During the winter, the Bashkargol lake freezes and is covered by heavy snow. In the summers, the basin of the lake is surrounded by a sheet of alpine flowers like rose hip and gentian. Apart from it, the lake is encircled by diverse pinus species which serves as an abode for wild birds, as well as Himalayan brown bears.

== Camping and Recreation ==
Although a much lesser-known lake, in recent year it has gained popularity as a camping spot for the locals of Laspur Valley as well as hikers who traverse from Chitral valley to Kumrat Valley in Upper Dir via Thalo Pass. It is also a stopover for mountaineers approaching the base camp of Thalo Zom peak.

== Gallery ==
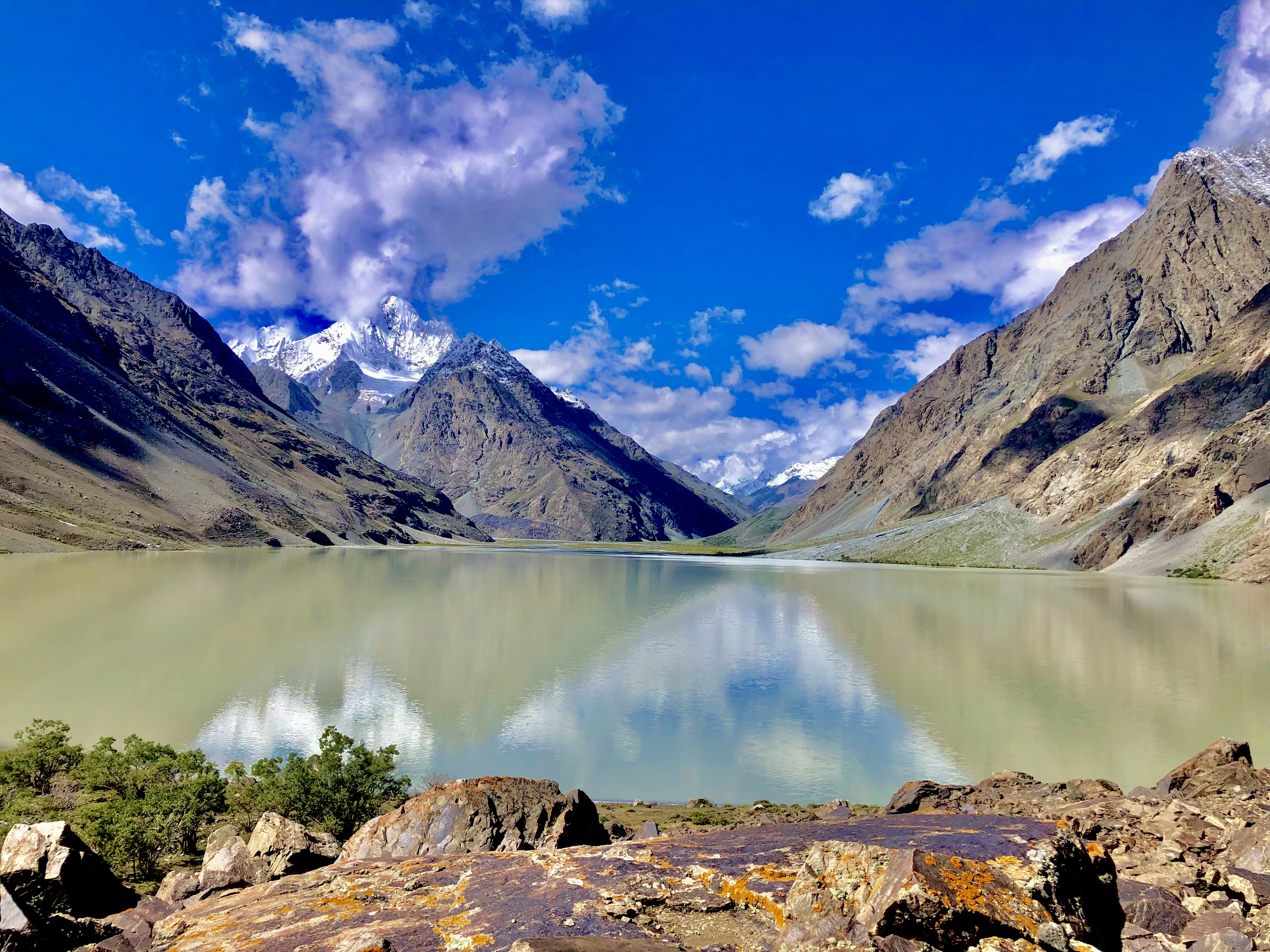

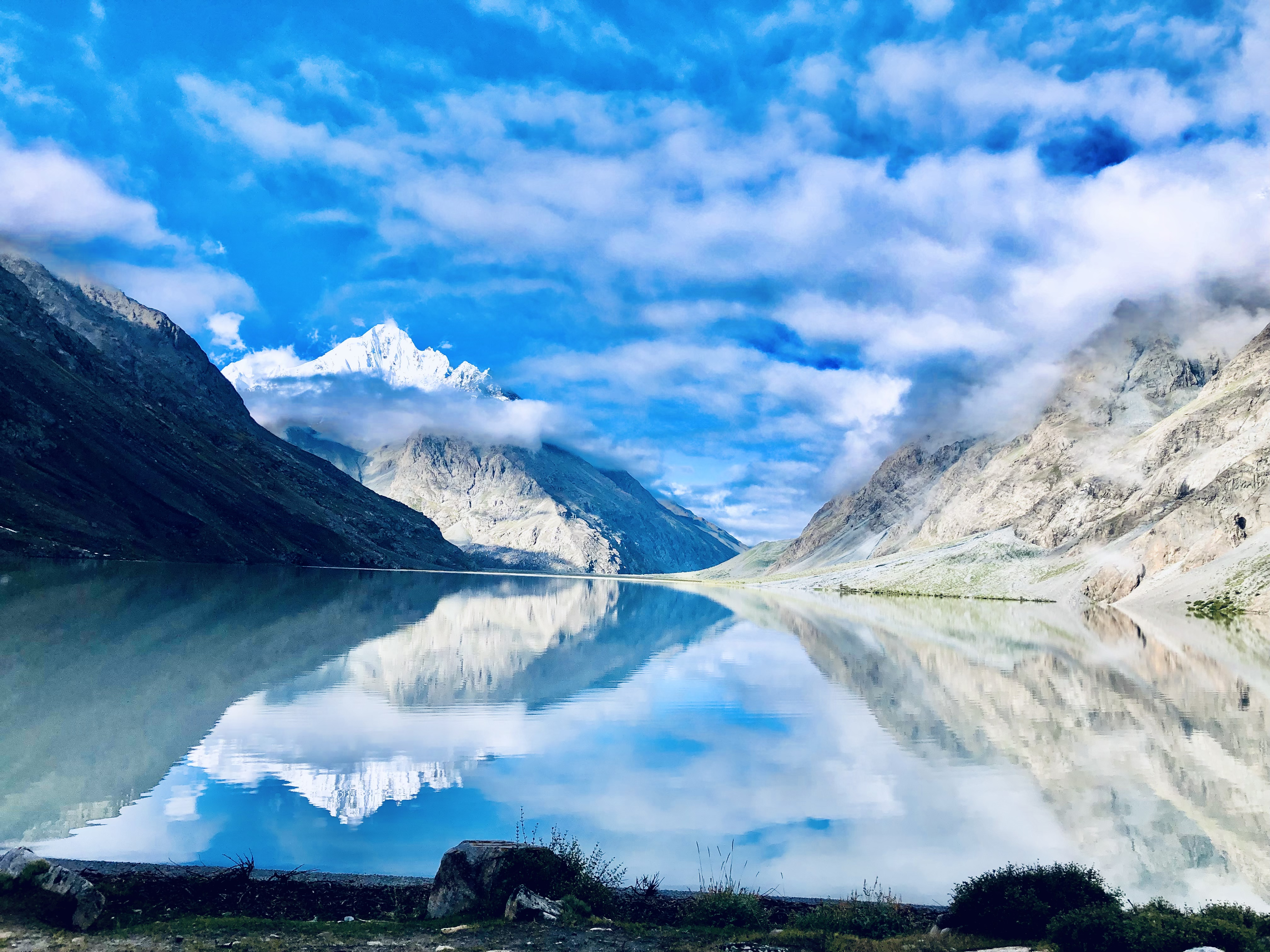

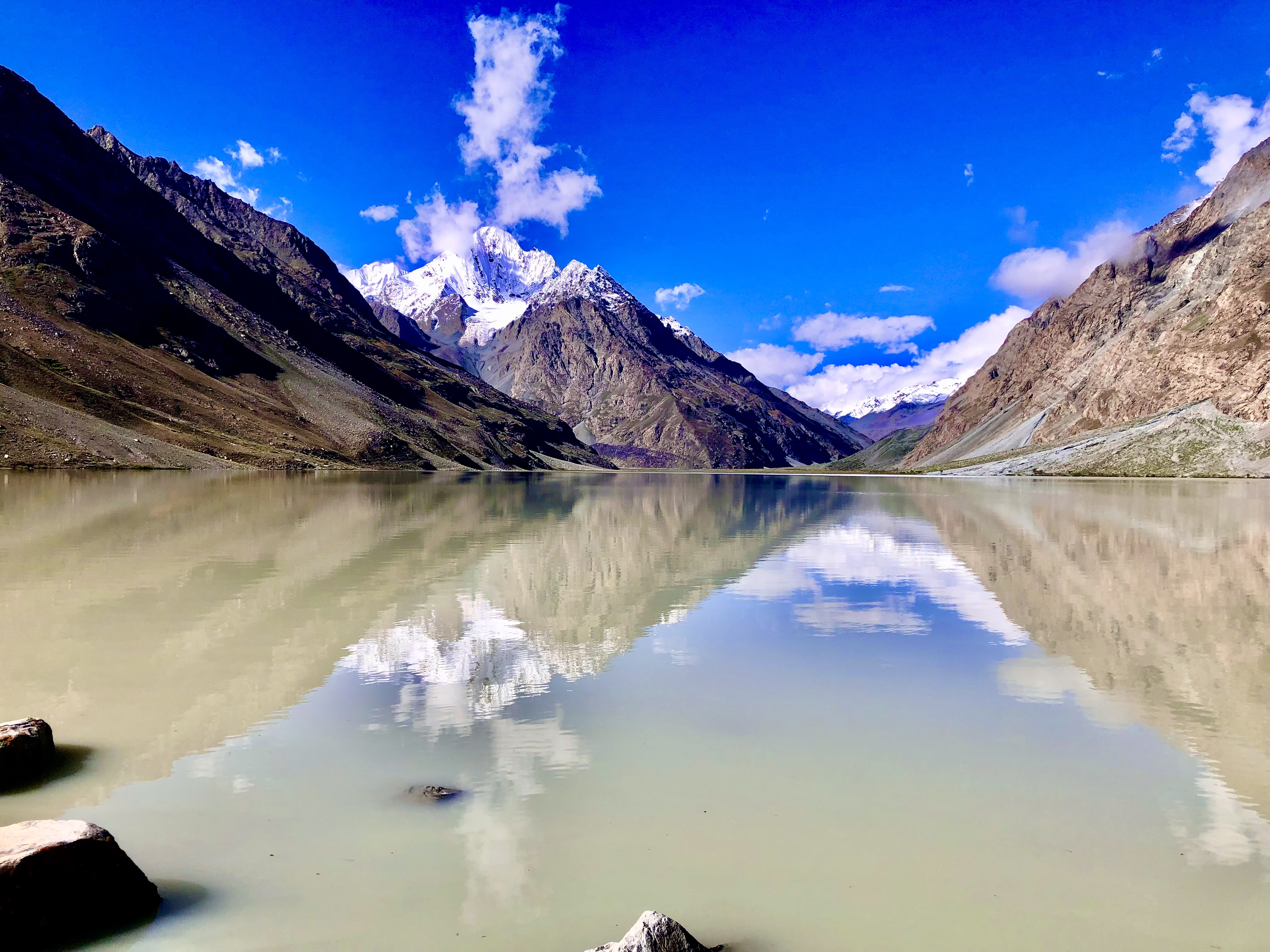

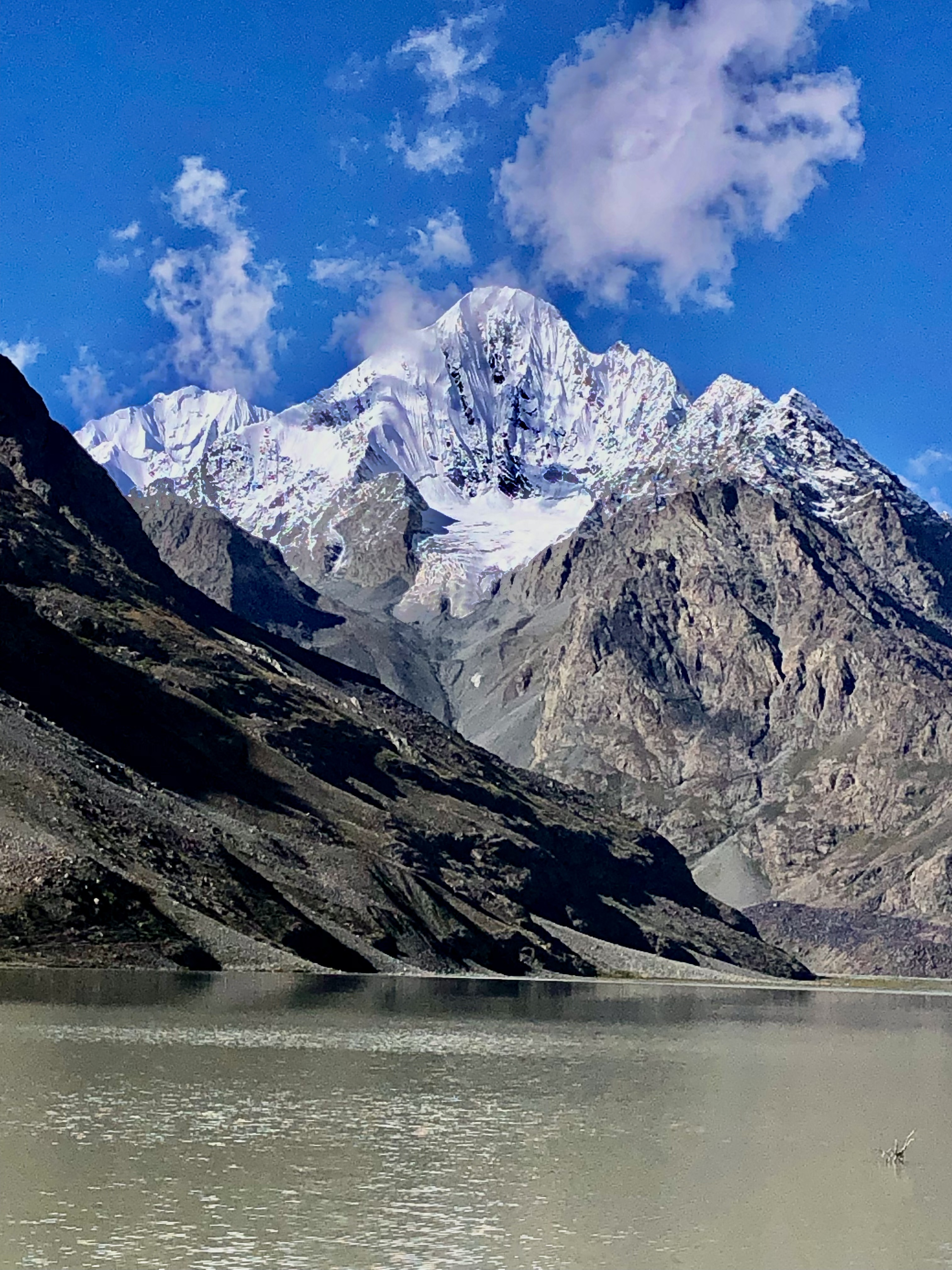

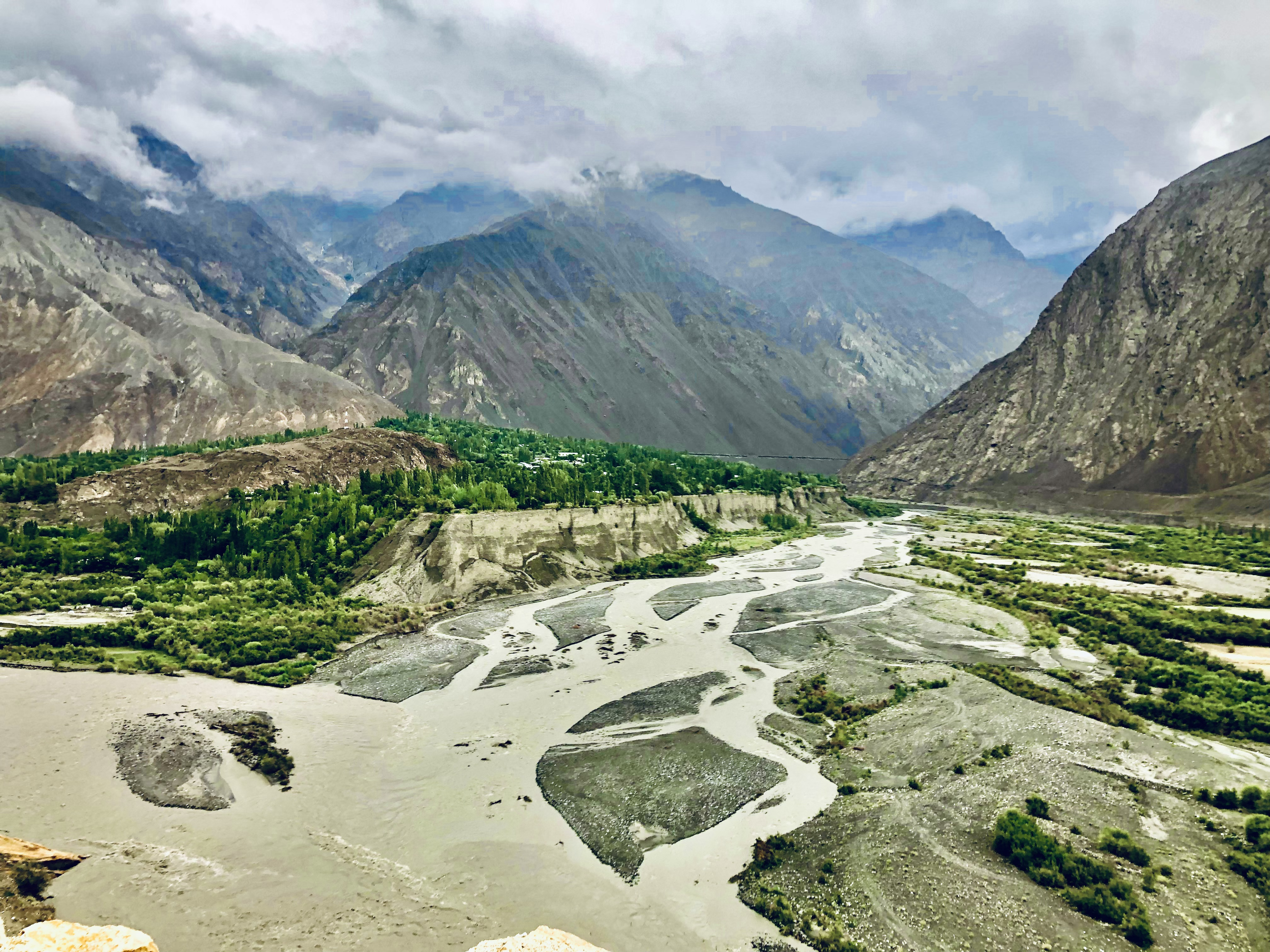

== See also ==
- List of lakes of Pakistan
- Attabad Lake
- Karambar Lake
- Khukush Lake
- Shandur Lake
