= Hamal Lake =

Lake in Pakistan

- Interactive map of Hamal Lake
- Location: Qambar Shahdadkot District, Sindh, Pakistan
- Coordinates: 27.449°N 67.632°E
- Basin countries: Pakistan
- Max. length: 25 km (16 mi)
- Max. width: 10 km (6.2 mi)
- Surface area: 1,200 ha (3,000 acres)

Hamal Lake (Urdu: حمل جھیل) is situated in Qambar Shahdadkot District in Sindh, Pakistan, 58 km from Larkana city and 40 km from Qambar town. The length of the lake is 25 km and the width is 10 km, with a surface area of 2,965 acres (1,200 ha). It is a fresh-water lake and the main source of water are the streams from Kirthar Mountains.

Hamal Lake is the habitat of resident and Siberian migratory birds like Ducks, Geese, Coots, Shorebirds, Cormorants, Flamingos, Herons, Ibises, Gulls, Terns and Egrets. It is also the great nursery of fresh-water fish. But now environment and wildlife of this lake is badly affected by the discharge of poisonous and saline water from the Hirdin drain.

== See also ==
- Haleji Lake
- Hadero Lake
- Kenjhar Jheel
- Lake Manchar
