= Bundala, Amritsar =

Bandala
- Village
- Location in Punjab, India Bandala (India)
- Coordinates: 31.531944°N 74.980556°E
- Country: India
- State: Punjab
- District: Amritsar

Government
  - Type: Sarpanch

Population
  - Total: 10,683
- Demonym: Hundal

Languages
  - Official: Punjabi
- Time zone: UTC+5:30 (IST)
- PIN: 143413
- Vehicle registration: PB02 ਤੋਂ ਬਿਲੋੰਗ ਕਰਦਾ

This is about the village in India. For the valley in Pakistan, see Bandala Valley.

Bandala, also spelt as Bundala, is a large village in Amritsar district situated in Amritsar within the Indian state of Punjab.

== Demographics ==
The village is home to 10,683 people, among them 5593 (52%) are male and 5090 (48%) are female. 66% of the whole population are from general caste, 34% are from schedule caste. Child (aged under 6 years) population of Bandala village is 12%, among them 56% are boys and 44% are girls. There are 1999 households in the village.

== Literacy ==
Total 6607 people in the village are literate, among them 3629 are male and 2978 are female. Literacy rate (children under 6 are excluded) of Bandala is 70%. 74% of male and 66% of female population are literate here.
