= Subri Lake =

Lake in Azad Kashmir, Pakistan

- Interactive map of Subri Lake
- Location: Muzaffarabad, Azad Kashmir
- Coordinates: 34.324°N 73.520°E
- Basin countries: Pakistan
- Surface elevation: 2,435 ft (742 m)

Subri Lake, also known as Langarpura Lake, is located 8 kilometres (5.0 mi) southeast of Muzaffarabad in Azad Kashmir, Pakistan. In 1975, the lake was formed due to a cloud burst where the Jhelum River widens. The lake is accessible by Muzaffarabad-Chakothi Road.

== See also ==
- List of lakes in Pakistan
