= Namık Kemal Şentürk =

Turkish politician (1922–2020)

- Born: 24 July 1922; Merzifon
- Died: 14 April 2020 (aged 97)
- Title: Politician

Namık Kemal Şentürk (24 July 1922 in Merzifon – 14 April 2020) was a Turkish politician.

He was the son of Bayburt lawyer Sinan Şentürk (son of Hasan Efendi, grandchild of Nazim Effendi, son of Hasan Effendi, grandson of Huseyin Effendi, from the Haciibrahim family of Kitre Village). He completed his primary and secondary education in Merzifon and his high school education in Erzurum.

He graduated from the Ankara University Faculty of Political Sciences in 1945. On 30 July 1945, he entered the state service as a Civil Servant at the Ministry of Internal Affairs. He worked as a civil servant in Amasya for two and a half years. During this period, he served as the Deputy of the Merzifon District Governor and Amasya in the Türmik and Alıcık Bucak Directorates of the Merzifon district.

Following the 11th Term district Governorate Course, he was appointed as the District Governor of the Sütçüler District of Isparta on 28 October 1948. He worked as Seben, Sarız, Bünyan and Foça District Governors respectively, and became a Property Inspector on 29 February 1956.

On 21 October 1977, he was elected to Republic Senate Membership by President Fahri Korutürk. In 1983, he was elected as the Deputy of Istanbul from MDP. He served as a Member of Haliç University Board of Trustees. He died on 14 April 2020.
