= Lashkargaz =

Village in Khyber Pakhtunkhwa, Pakistan

Lashkargaz Wakhi/Urdu: لشکر گاز
- Village
- Location within Khyber Pakhtunkhwa
- Coordinates: 36°52′14″N 73°26′55″E
- Country: Pakistan
- Province: Khyber Pakhtunkhwa
- District: Upper Chitral
- Time zone: UTC+5 (PKT)

Lashkargaz is a village located in Upper Chitral District, Khyber Pakhtunkhwa, Pakistan. It lies approximately 23.5 kms from the Karambar Lake, a well-known natural and tourist destination The village is situated near the site of Jashn-e-Broghil, a local yak polo festival held annually on 14 August to mark Jashn-e-Azadi.

Lashkargaz is regarded as the last village of the Broghil Valley. The majority of its population is Wakhi, with smaller communities of Sarikoli and Kyrgyz, most of whom have largely assimilated into the Wakhi community.
