= Pyala Lake =

Lake in Kaghan Valley, Pakistan

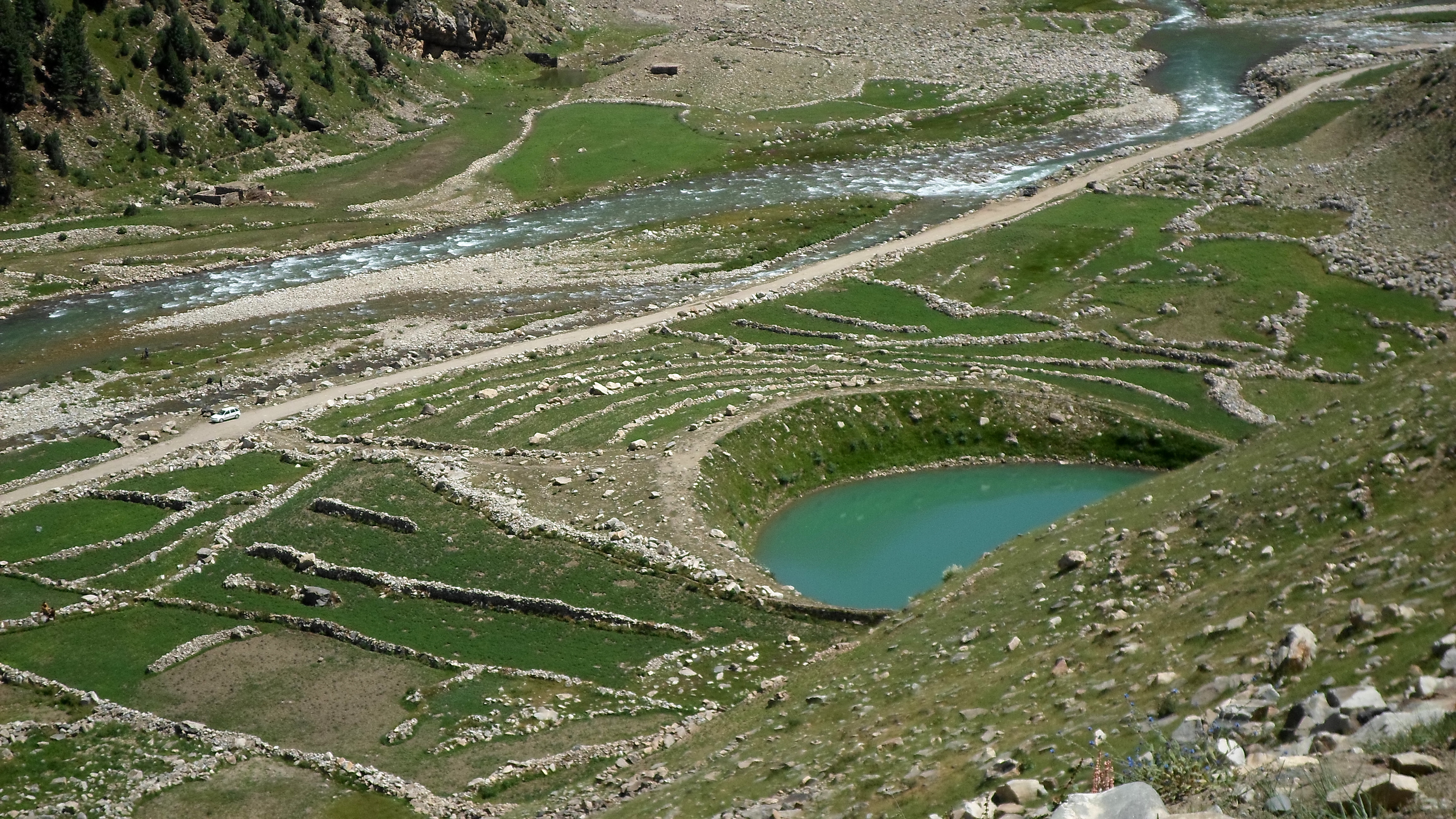
- Pyala Lake, Kaghan Valley

- Location within Khyber Pakhtunkhwa Location within Pakistan
- Location: Jalkhand, Kaghan Valley
- Coordinates: 35°0′27.7524″N 73°56′28.8852″E
- Lake type: Round
- Basin countries: Pakistan
- Surface elevation: 3,410 metres (11,190 ft)
- Settlements: Jalkhand, Kaghan Valley

Pyala Lake (transl. Bowl Lake) is a small natural lake in Jalkhand, Kaghan Valley, Mansehra District of Khyber Pakhtunkhwa. Located 40 kilometres (25 mi) from Naran, the lake's circular shape gives it its name.

== See also ==
- Ansu Lake
- Lulusar Lake
