= Haleji Lake =

Lake in Sindh, Pakistan

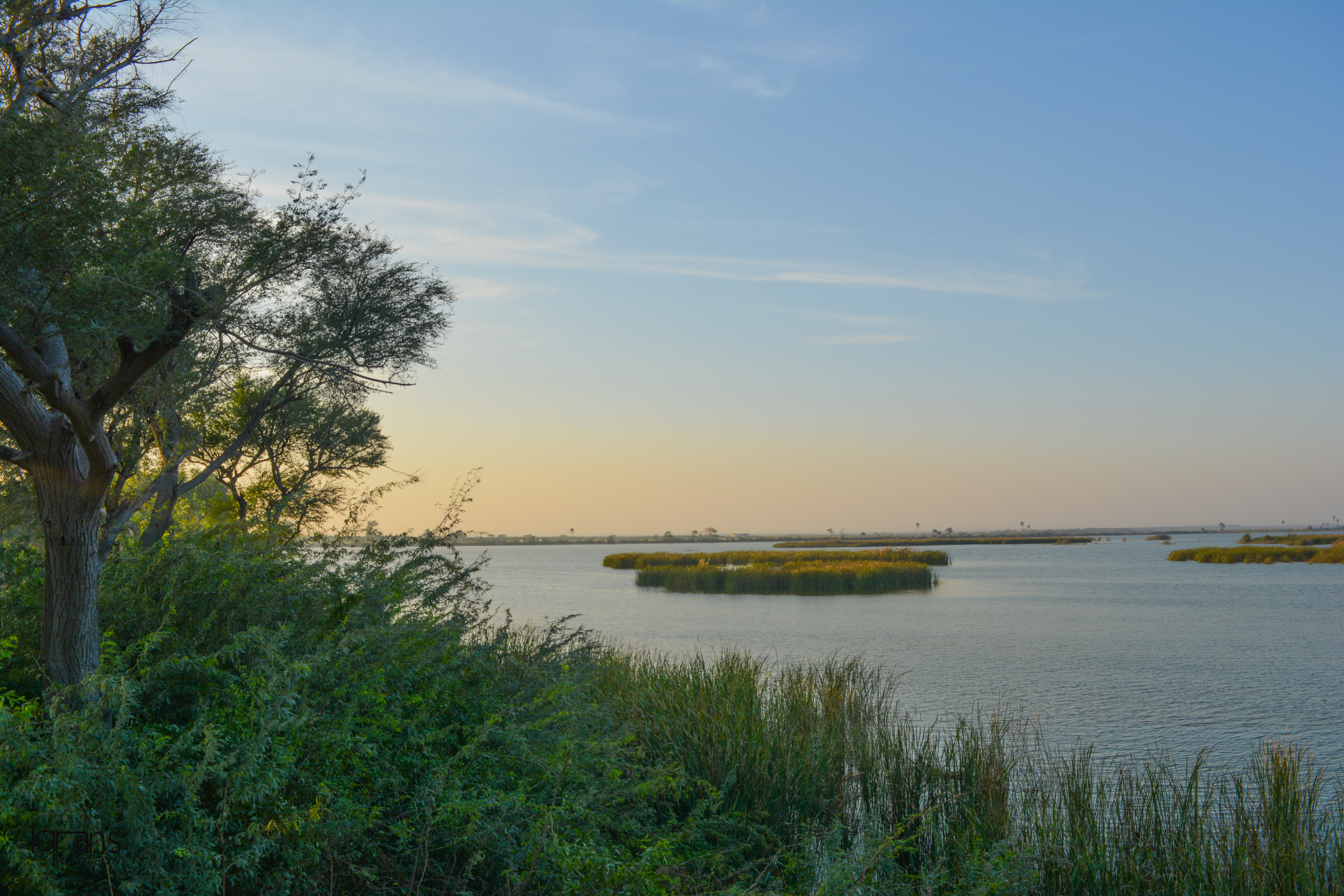
- Interactive map of Haleji Lake
- Location: Thatta District, Sindh, Pakistan
- Coordinates: 24.806°N 67.779°E
- Basin countries: Pakistan
- Max. length: 2 km (1.2 mi)
- Max. width: 2 km (1.2 mi)
- Surface area: 4 km^{2} (1.5 sq mi)
- Average depth: 5 m (16 ft)
- Max. depth: 5 m (16 ft)
- Settlements: Thatta, Karachi

Ramsar Wetland
- Designated: 23 July 1976
- Reference no.: 101

Haleji Lake (Urdu: ہالیجی جھیل) is a perennial freshwater lake in Thatta District of Sindh Province, Pakistan. It is 6.58 km^{2} (2.54 sq mi) in size and is surrounded by marshes and brackish seepage lagoons.

== History ==
Haleji Lake was a saline lagoon until the 1930s and was converted into a reservoir to provide additional water to Karachi. During World War II, additional water was required for troops stationed at Karachi. The then-British Government of Sindh Province decided to increase the capacity of the lake by introducing a feeder canal from the Indus River. Salt water was drained out and an embankment was constructed around the lake which was fed with fresh water through a canal. The work was placed on a war footing and was completed within 24 months in 1943.

== Fauna ==
Haleji Lake is a wintering site for native and migratory waterfowl such as cotton teal, Indian spot-billed duck, purple moorhen and pheasant-tailed jacana. It is also a breeding site for egrets and herons.

== See also ==
- Hamal Lake
- Hadero Lake
