= Khanpur Dam =

Dam, lake, and tourist site near Islamabad, Pakistan

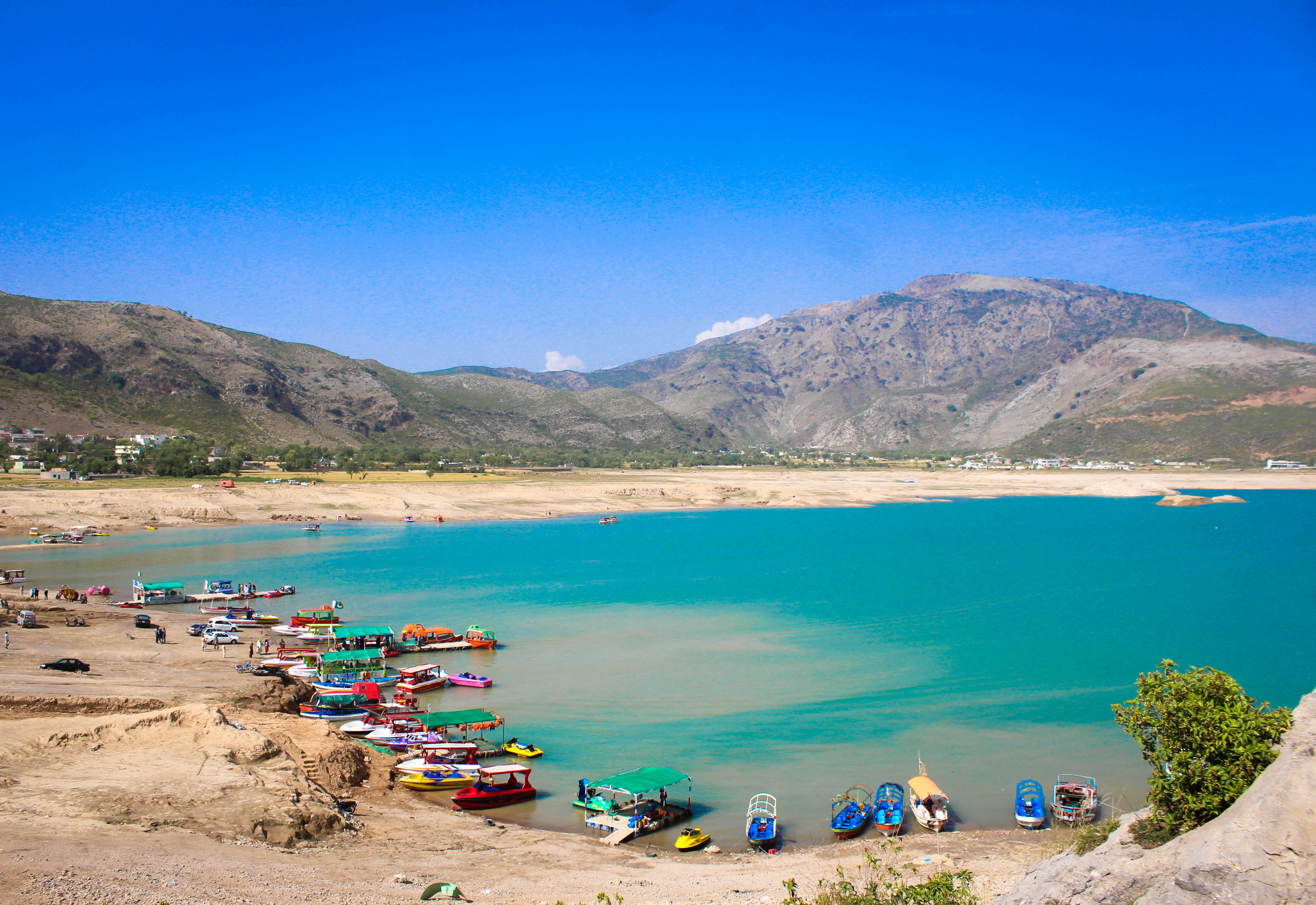
- Interactive map of Khanpur Dam
- Official name: خان پور ڈیم
- Country: Pakistan
- Location: Khanpur, Khyber Pakhtunkhwa
- Coordinates: 33.807°N 72.936°E
- Purpose: Supply of drinking and irrigation water to the Islamabad–Rawalpindi metropolitan area
- Status: Operational
- Opening date: 1984
- Construction cost: 1.385 billion Pakistani rupees (Equivalent to ₨26.4 billion in 2021)

Dam and spillways
- Height: 51 m (167 ft)

Reservoir
- Creates: Khanpur Lake
- Total capacity: 79,980 acre⋅ft (98,650,000 m^{3})

The Khanpur Dam is located on the Haro River in Khanpur, Khyber Pakhtunkhwa, about 50 km from Islamabad, the capital of Pakistan. It forms Khan Pur Lake, a reservoir that supplies drinking water to Islamabad and Rawalpindi and irrigation water to many of the agricultural and industrial areas surrounding the cities.

The dam was completed in 1983 after a 15-year construction period, at a cost of ₨1,385.1 million. It is 51 m (167 ft) high and stores 79,980 acre-feet (98,650,000 m^{3}) of water.

== Tourism ==
Khanpur Dam's location within a gorge bordered by hills and vegetation forms a reservoir of water. It functions as an important water source for the region and is also used for recreation. The site attracts visitors for activities such as boating, fishing, and picnicking, and serves both local residents and tourists from across the country. The deserted Rajgan Mosque, locally known as "Rajon ki Masjid", is located in the area. Sculptures and heads dating back to the 2nd–5th centuries CE have been discovered during excavation at the Bhamala Buddhist Complex near Khanpur, known as the Bhamala Stupa. The area has been declared a UNESCO World Heritage Site.

== Gallery ==
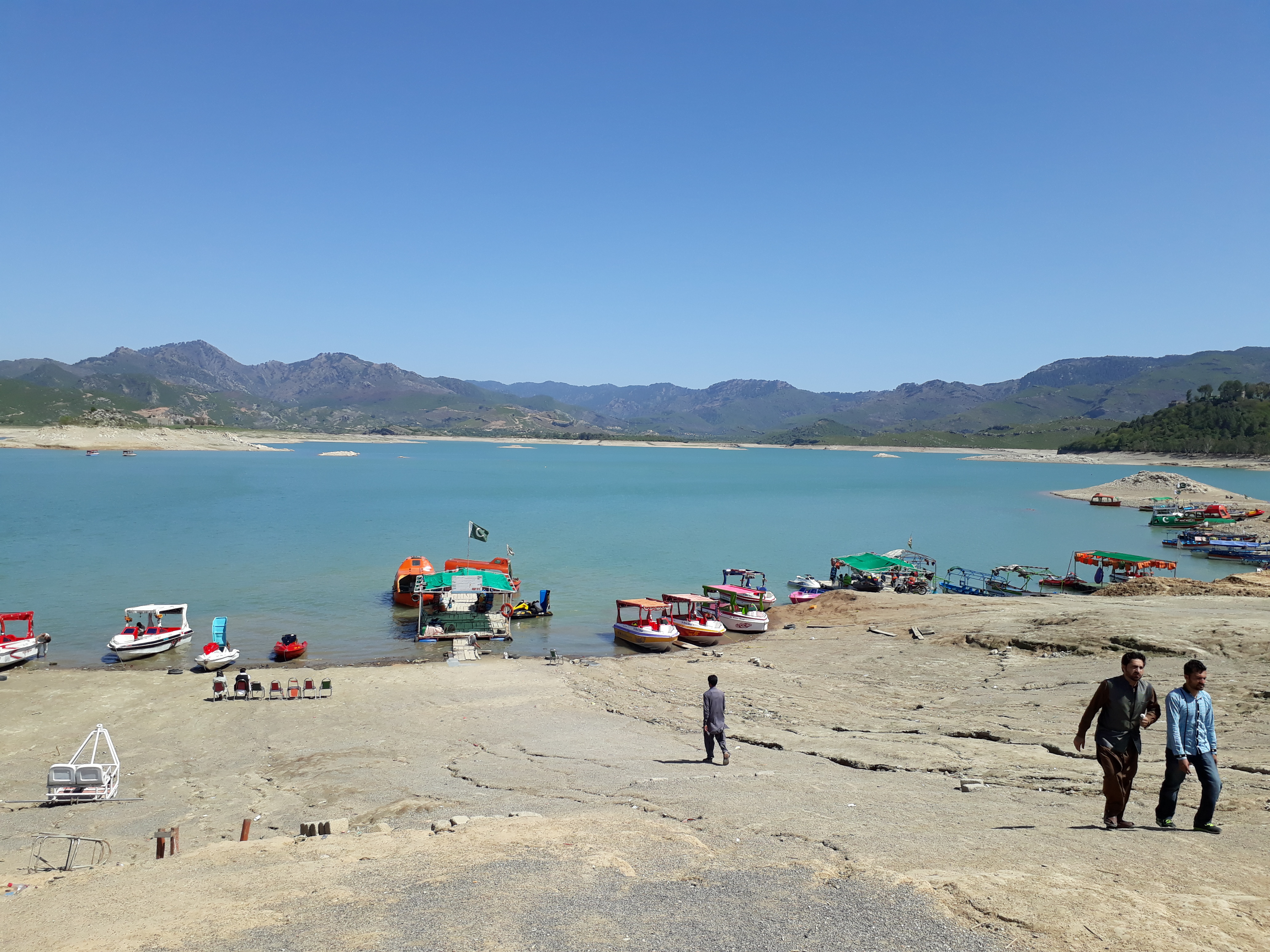
Khanpur Lake Pakistan

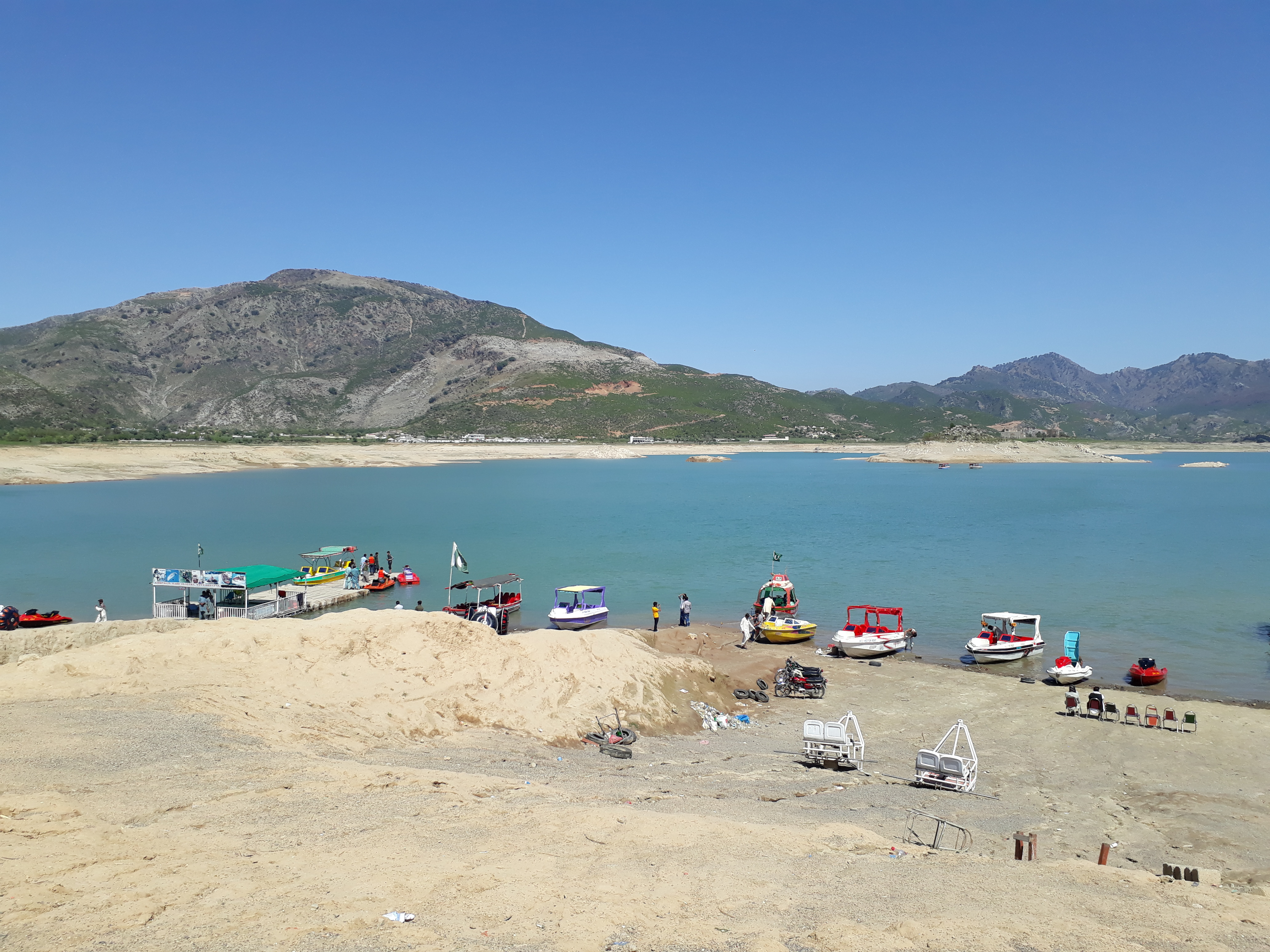
Khanpur Lake Pakistan

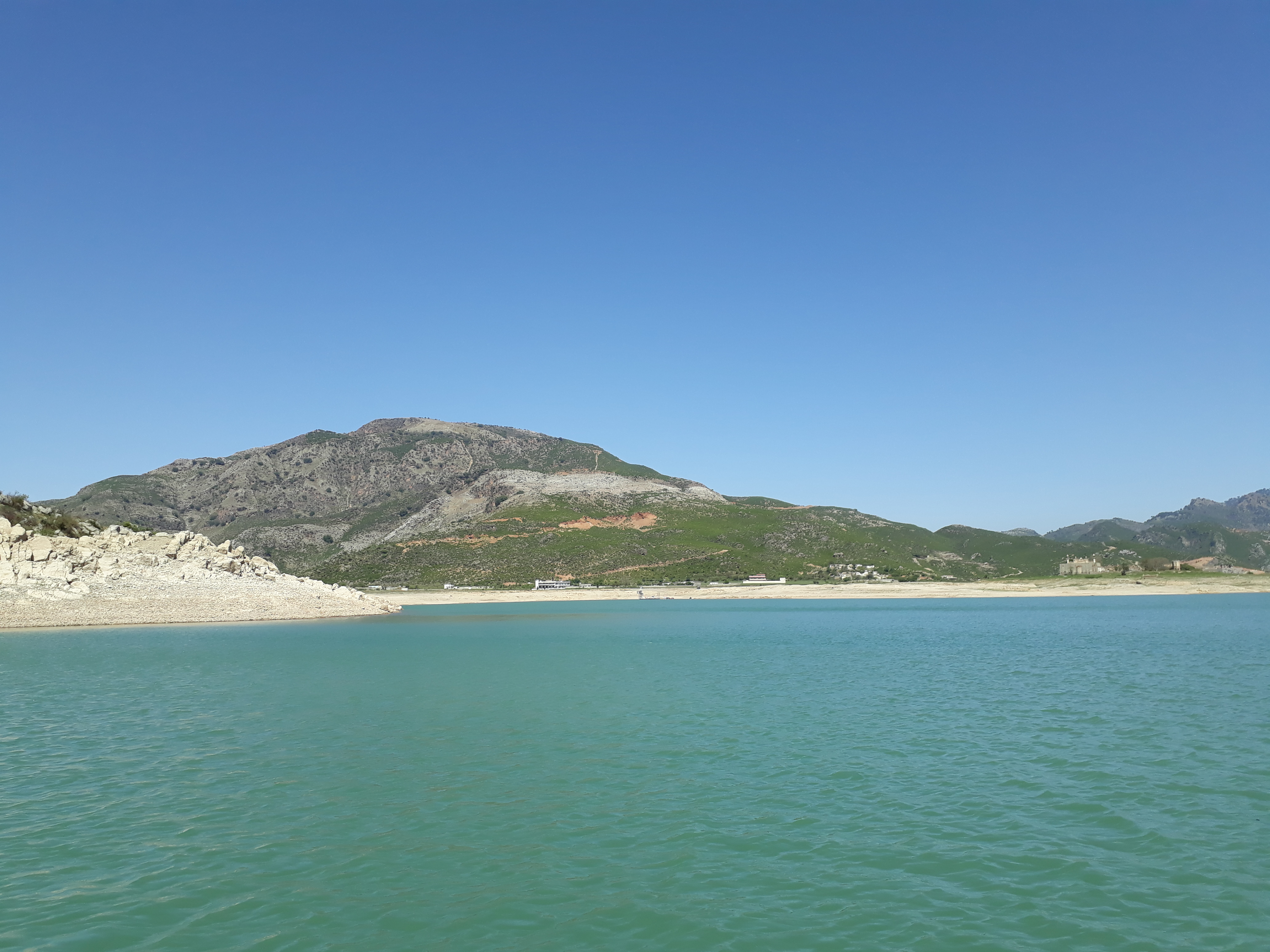
Khanpur Lake Pakistan

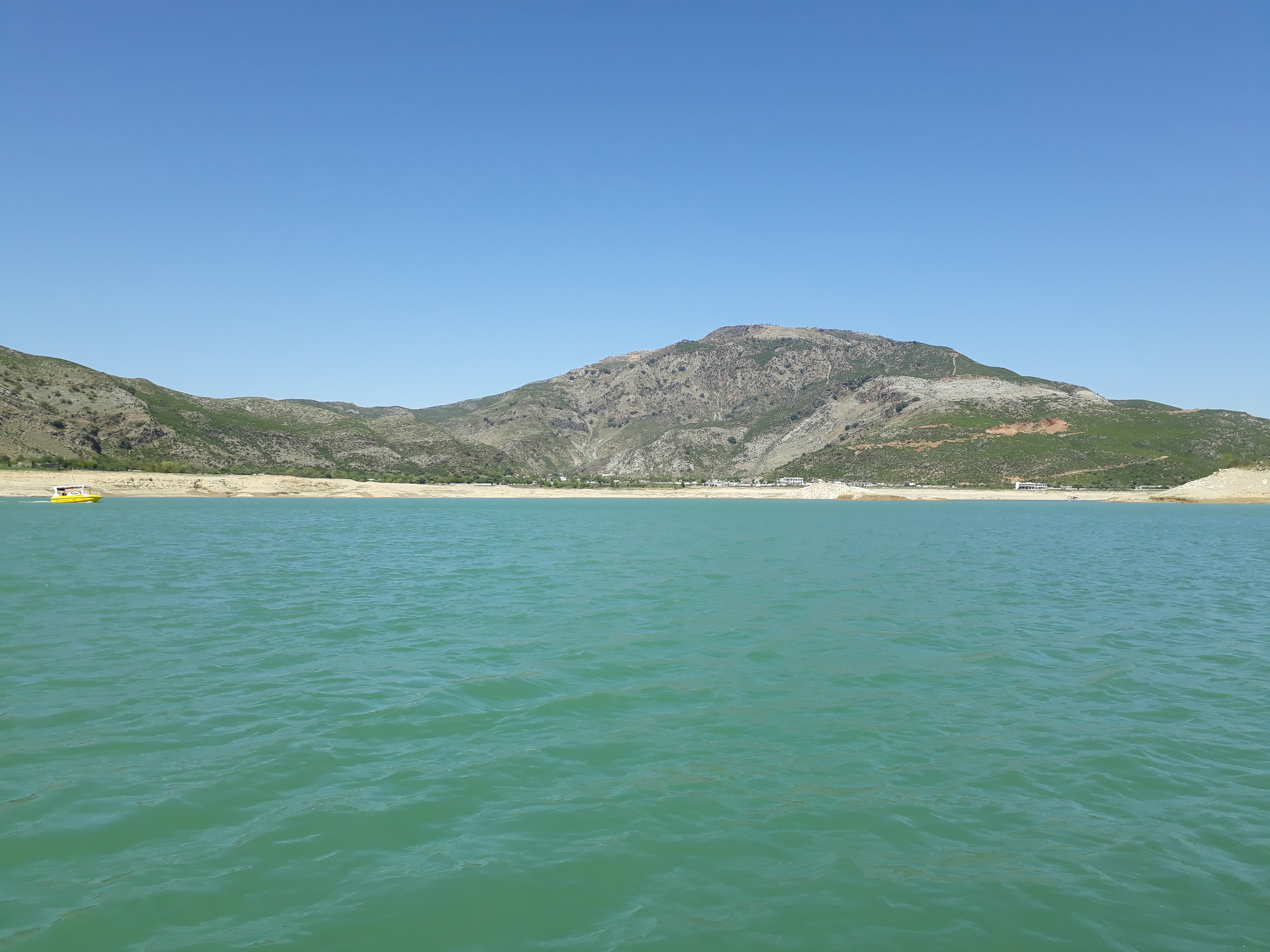
Khanpur Lake Pakistan

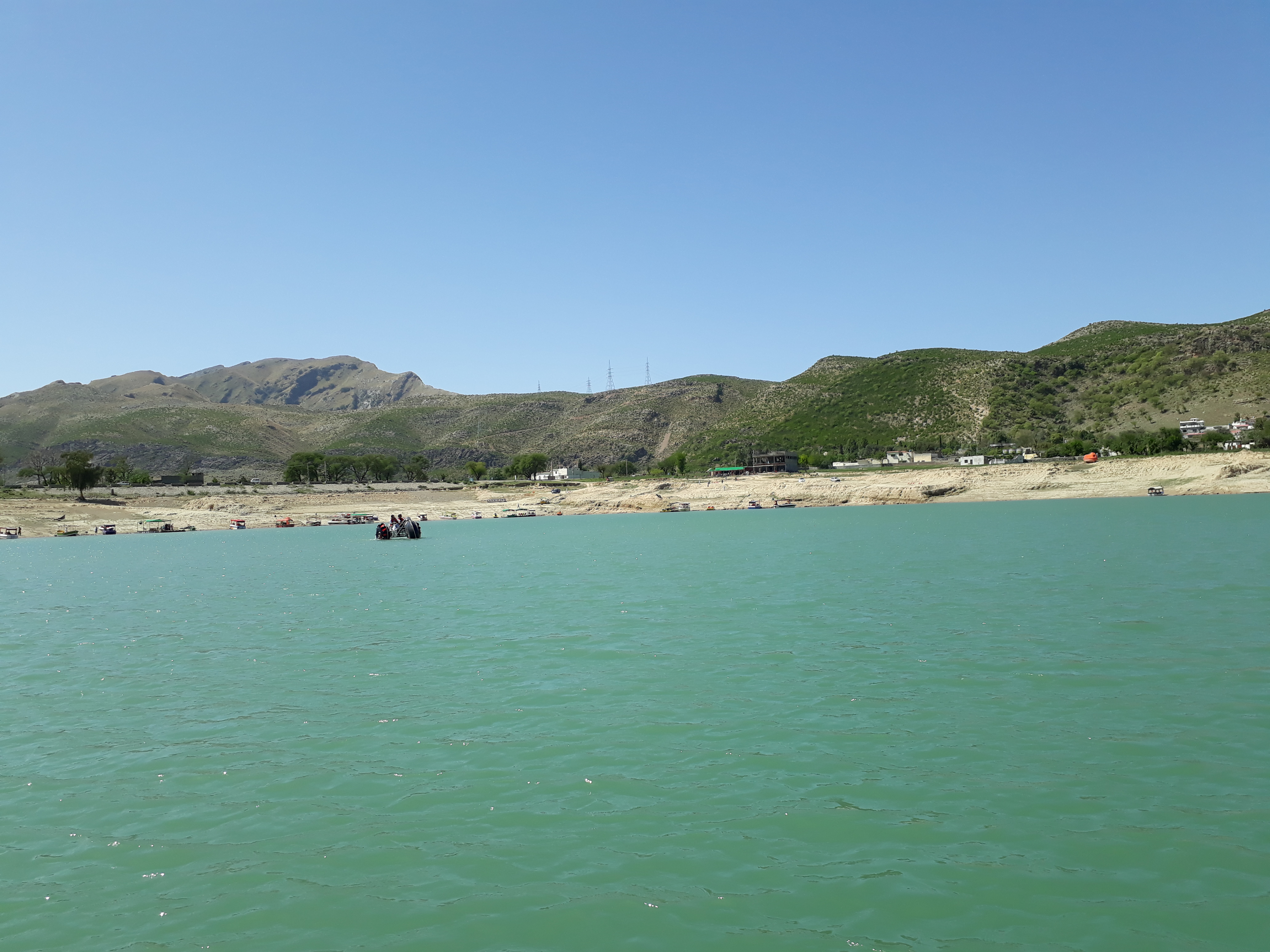
Khanpur Lake Pakistan

== See also ==
- List of dams and reservoirs in Pakistan
- List of power stations in Pakistan
