= Malika Parbat =

Peak in Kaghan Valley, Pakistan

Malika Parbat ملکہ پربت
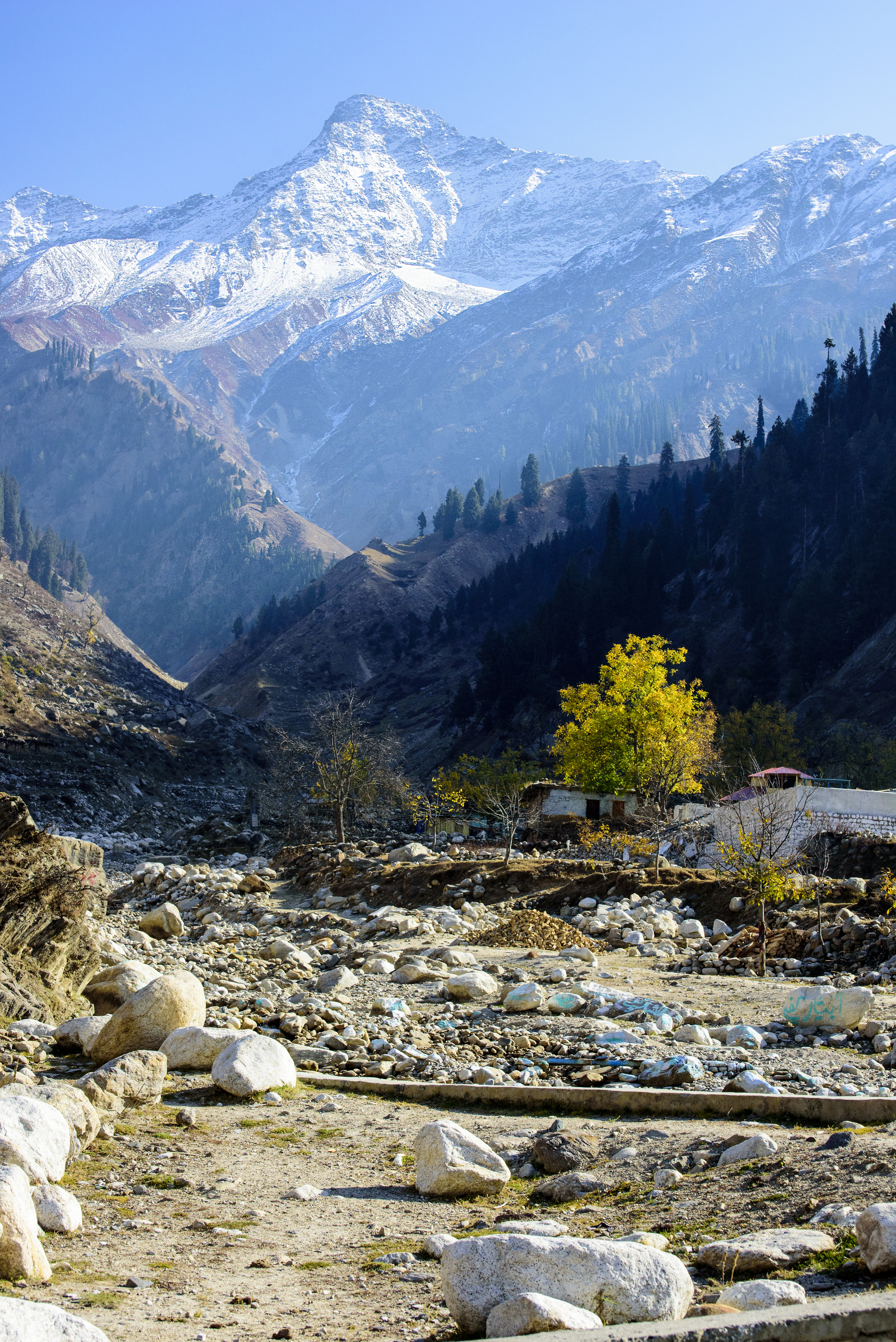
- Malika Parbat literally "Queen of Mountains"

Highest point
- Elevation: 5,290 m (17,360 ft)
- Prominence: 1,357 m (4,452 ft)
- Coordinates: 34°48′21.25″N 73°43′27.58″E

Geography
- Location within Pakistan Location within Khyber Pakhtunkhwa
- Location: Kaghan Valley, Khyber Pakhtunkhwa, Pakistan
- Parent range: Himalayas

Climbing
- First ascent: 1920

Malika Parbat (Urdu: ملکہ پربت; lit. 'Queen of the Mountains') is the highest peak in the Kaghan Valley as well as the Hazara region of Khyber Pakhtunkhwa, Pakistan, with an elevation of 5,290 metres (17,360 ft). It lies about 6 kilometres (3.7 mi) south of Lake Saiful Muluk, near Ansoo Lake.

The mountain towers in the background near the popular tourist spot of Lake Saiful Muluk. Malika Parbat is accessible from Naran-Lake Saiful Muluk side and from Batakundi-Dadar Chitta glacier. There are three summits that form Malika Parbat: Malika Parbat (North Peak), Malika Parbat Cresta, and Malika Parbat (South Peak). There are other peaks which offer considerable climbing difficulty in Siran Basin, Khabanar Valley and Burji Valley, while from Burawai, another cirque of low peaks is equally known for mountaineering.

== Climbing history ==
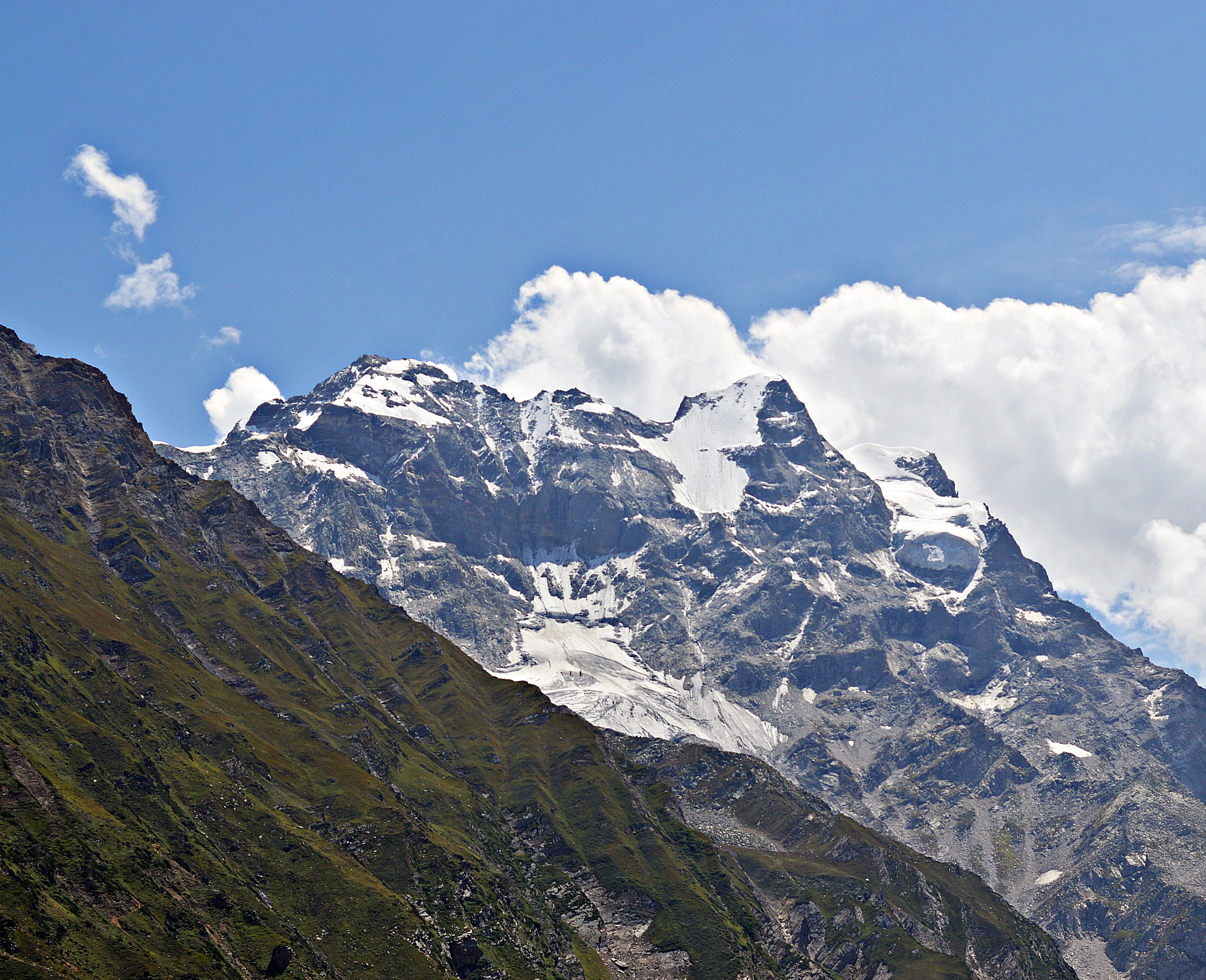
Malika Parbat

Only twelve climbers have reached the top of Malika Parbat (North Peak) until now. The North Summit was firstly reached by Captain B.W. Battye and four Gurkha soldiers in 1920 followed by a second ascent made by Trevor Braham, Norman Norris and Gene White in 1967.

In 1998, two Pakistanis, Rashid Butt and Omer Aziz climbed the Malika Parbat main peak. Rashid Butt lost his life while descending down the sheer slopes on the south peak. Since then there are no available documentation regarding other ascents or attempts until in July 2012, when a Pakistani climber Imran Junaidi and Jens Simonsen from Denmark reached the peak of Malika Parbat at 5,290 metres (17,360 ft). Imran Junaidi is the first Pakistani to have climbed the north peak. The mountain is considered non-climbable among the local population due to its steepness as well as supernatural hazards. The five-day climbing expedition was initiated by both climbers as an expression of growing friendship between Denmark and Pakistan. This expedition is not only the first ever joint Pakistan-Danish climbing expedition, but it is also the first ever Pakistani ascent of the North Peak.

In August 2012, an expedition of four members led by Ahmed Mujtaba Ali reported summiting the Malika Parbat. Other members of the expedition were Ahmed Naveed, Kamal Haider and Saqib Ali. The two mountaineers reached 5,180 metres (16,990 ft). By then, clouds had gathered and a hail storm followed.

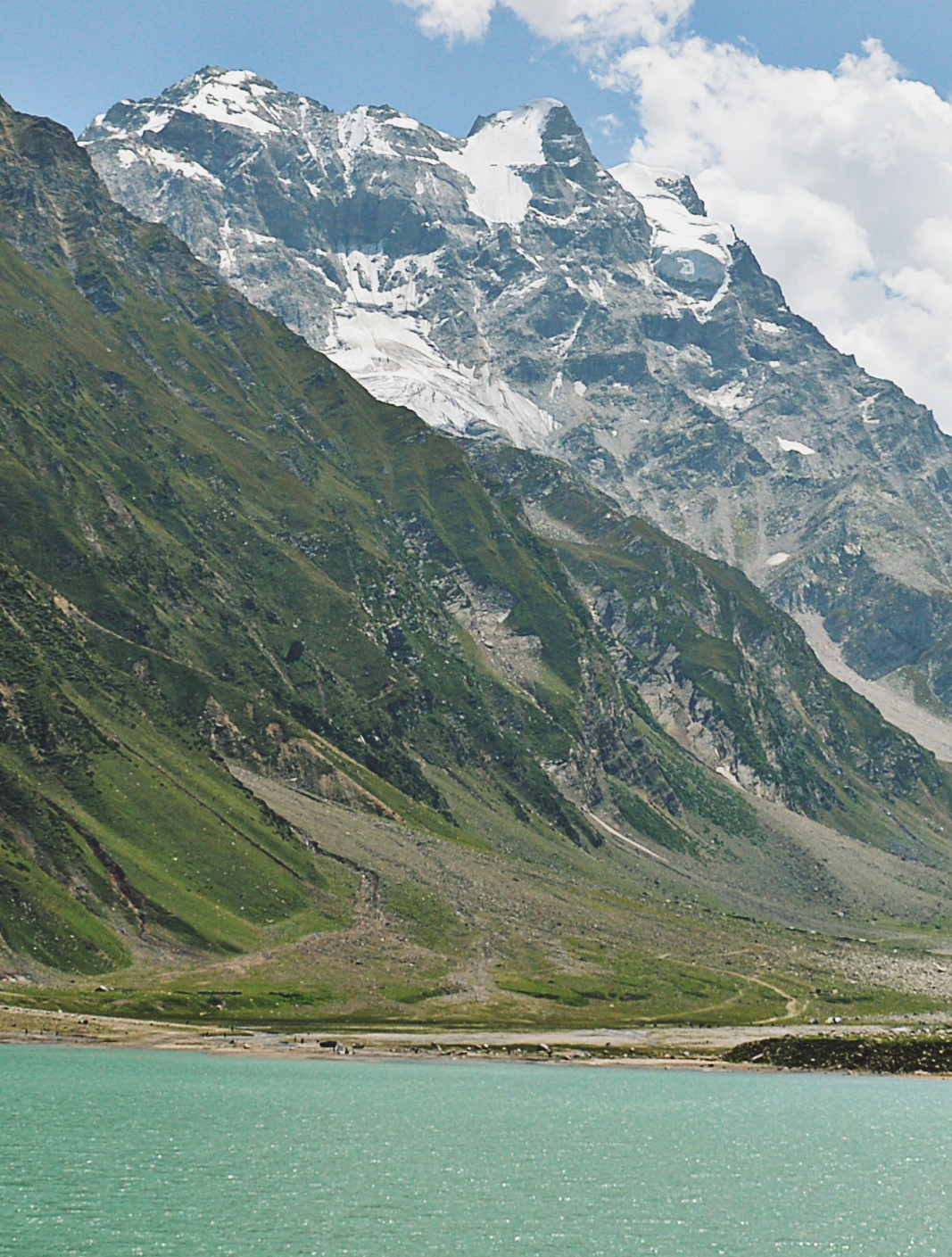
Malika Parbat and the Lake Saiful Muluk

== See also ==
- Musa ka Musalla
- List of mountains in Pakistan
- List of the highest mountains in the world
