= Ansoo Lake =

Lake in Kaghan Valley, Pakistan

Ansoo lake
- آنسوجھیل (Urdu)
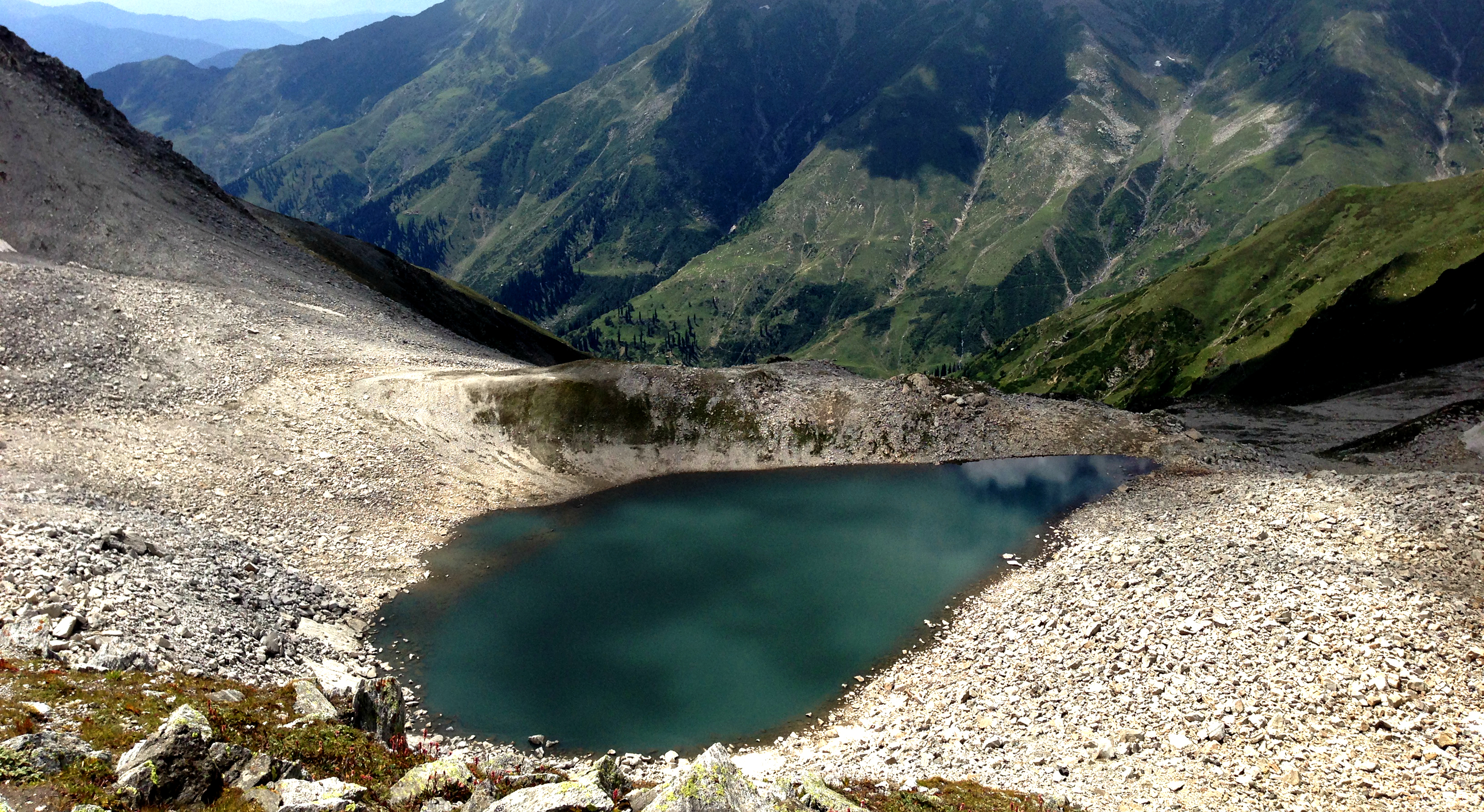
- A view of melted Ansoo Lake

- Location within Khyber Pakhtunkhwa Location within Pakistan
- Location: Kaghan, Himalaya
- Coordinates: 34°48′49.98″N 73°40′35.94″E
- Type: Lake
- Basin countries: Pakistan
- Surface elevation: 4,126 meters (13,537 ft)

Ansoo Lake, (Urdu: آنسو جھیل), translated as Teardrop Lake, is situated in the Kaghan Valley of Khyber Pakhtunkhwa. As its name suggests, it is a tear-shaped body of water located in Pakistan's Mansehra District.

At an elevation of 4,126 metres (13,537 ft) above sea level, Ansoo Lake stands as one of the highest lakes in the Himalayan Range. It lies in proximity to Malika Parbat, the tallest peak in the Kaghan Valley.

== History ==
Ansoo Lake was stumbled upon in 1993 by Pakistan Air Force pilots flying at a relatively low altitude over the region. Growing tourism has strained the path to the lake and its natural surroundings, revealing its ecological fragility.

== See also ==
- List of lakes in Pakistan
- Pyala Lake
