= Ganga Lake (India) =

Lake in Itanagar, Arunachal Pradesh, India

- Geker Sinying
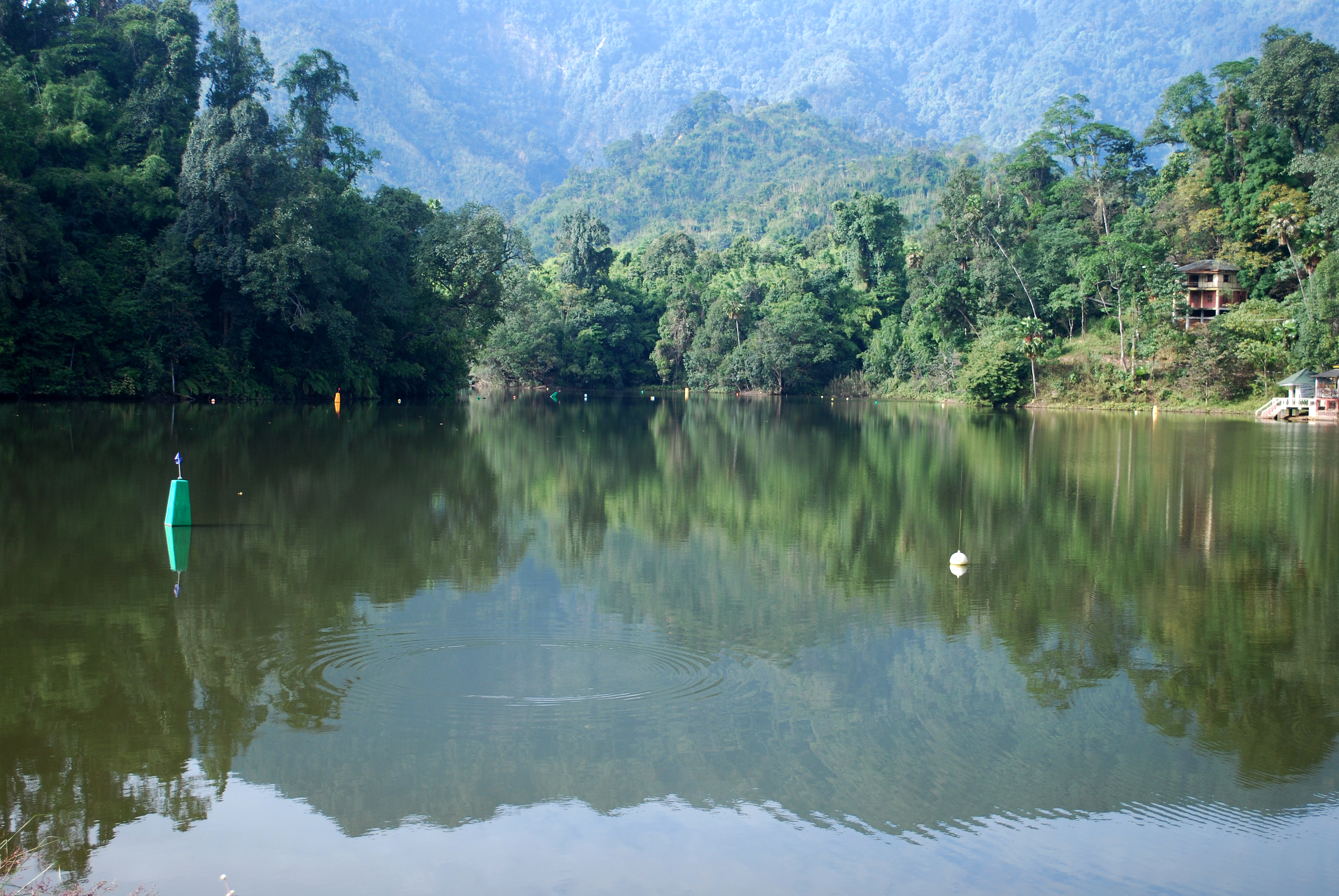
- Ganga Lake at Itanagar, 2010

- Location within Arunachal Pradesh
- Location: Itanagar, Arunachal Pradesh, India
- Coordinates: 27.075°N 93.568°E
- Type: lake

Gyekir Sinyi also known as Ganga Lake, is a lake in Itanagar, the capital of Arunachal Pradesh. It is a natural, freshwater lake that is located within the Itanagar Wildlife Sanctuary. It is one of the popular places in Itanagar. People from all around visit this place as a recreation spot. Ganga Lake is located 6 kilometres (3.7 mi) from Itanagar. 126 species of butterflies belonging have been identified near the lake area.

== History ==
Tai Bida is a prominent figure in the folklore of Arunachal Pradesh, India, credited with the discovery of Ganga Lake, locally known as Gekar Sinyi. According to tradition, Tai Bida captured a wild mithun—a bovine species native to the region—which brought him immense prosperity by producing numerous offspring. When he planned to sacrifice this original mithun for a ritual, the animal fled, leading its progeny into the forest. Tai Bida tracked their footprints across various terrains, ultimately arriving at a pristine lake where the tracks vanished into the water.

In an effort to preserve and document this significant folklore, a two-day trekking expedition was organized in December 2021. Led by Rajya Sabha Member of Parliament Nabam Rebia, the expedition traced the mythical journey of Tai Bida from Taa Shi to Budum Langney (Snake Stone) in the Toru Circle of Sagalee Sub-Division. The initiative aimed to explore the adventure tourism potential of the region and to immortalize the tale of Tai Bida and his mithuns in modern media.
