= Hadero Lake =

Lake in Sindh, Pakistan

- Interactive map of Hadero Lake
- Location: Thatta District, Sindh
- Coordinates: 24°49′42″N 67°51′37″E
- Basin countries: Pakistan
- Surface area: 1,321 hectares (3,260 acres)

Hadero Lake (Urdu: ہڈیری جھیل) is located in Thatta District, Sindh. It is an important brackish wetland, where waterfowl occur. It was declared a wildlife sanctuary for the protection of migratory and resident birds.

Hadero Lake is a natural lake in a shallow depression. It has a surface area of 1,321 ha (5.10 sq mi) and is located on the edge of a stony desert, about 85 km (53 mi) to the east of Karachi. It is considered one of the favourite lakes of ornithologist. Among the fauna, in addition to the fish, waterfowl occur in large numbers, including swans, storks, cranes and feeding flocks of pelicans. Also waders and cormorants are common.

The lake was initially declared a game reserve under Section 15 of the West Pakistan Wildlife Protection Ordinance 1959 in 1971. In 1977 it was declared a Wildlife Sanctuary under a notification by Government of Sindh. At the time of declaration of the protected area local people were allowed to catch fish from lake, but did not have the right to disturb the birds in winter season. It was initially protected for shooting purpose in 1971 but keeping in view its potential and the birds varieties here, it ultimately got the status of a wildlife sanctuary. Because of its fish resources, local fishermen were allowed to catch fish for their livelihood. The lake is owned by the Government. For regular monitoring of wetland resources, the Sindh Wildlife Department has provided a facility of residential quarters for sanctuary staff, which consists of one sanctuary assistant, and six game watchers.

== See also ==
- Hamal Lake
- Haleji Lake
