= Paristan Lake =

- Interactive map of Paristan Lake
- Location: Near Skardu, Gilgit-Baltistan, Pakistan
- Coordinates: 35°24′23″N 72°24′50″E
- Type: High-altitude lake
- Surface elevation: 4,767 m (15,640 ft)

Paristan Lake is a lake in Gilgit-Baltistan, Pakistan. It was discovered in 2018 by mountaineers exploring near Skardu at 15,641 feet (4,767 meters) above sea level. It is the highest lake in Pakistan and also one of the highest lakes in the world.
