= Hassanabad, Hunza =

- Village
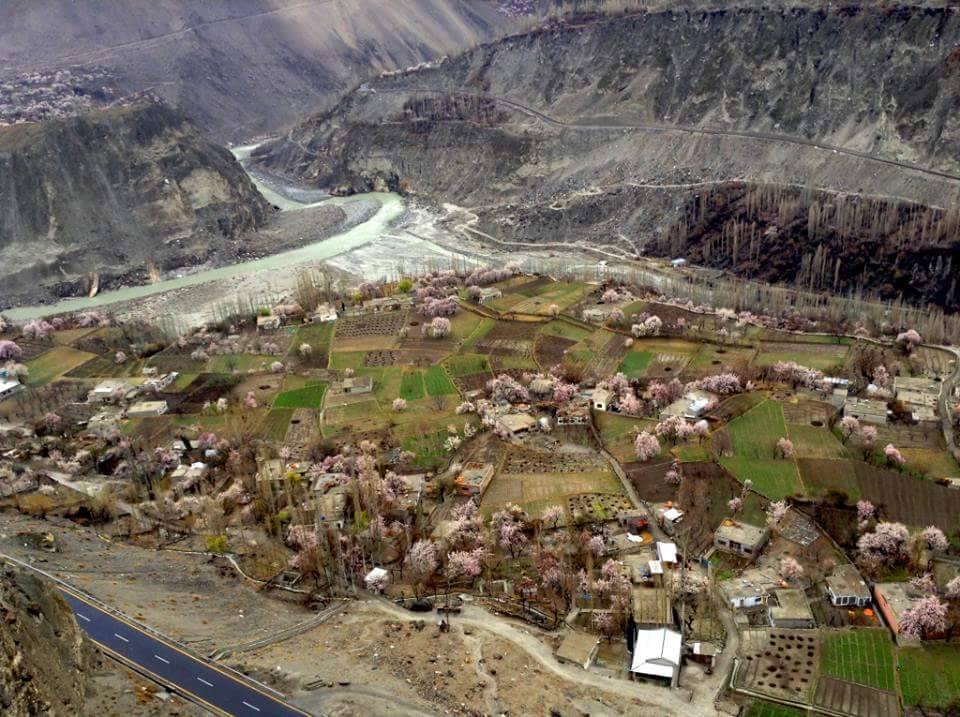
- Hassanabad during Cherry blossom

- Location in Pakistan
- Coordinates: 36°17′53″N 74°35′42″E
- Country: Pakistan
- Region: Gilgit Baltistan
- District: Hunza

Area
  - Total: 2.1 km^{2} (0.81 sq mi)
- Elevation: 2,100 m (6,900 ft)

Hassanabad is one of the villages of the Hunza Valley in Gilgit Baltistan region. Situated in the Karakoram mountain range, the village lies at risk to glacial lake outburst floods (GLOFs) originating from the surrounding glaciers specially the Shishper Glacier. The Karakoram Highway (KKH) crawls through Hassanabad, with total length of 5 kilometers. Hassanabad is known for power generation, with almost all of the hydro-power projects of Hunza located here, except for Ahmedabad Hydel Power Plant.

== Location ==
Hassanabad is located in between Aliabad and Murtazaabad villages. Hassanabad is located at an average height of 2100 meters. Hassanabad is also gateway to Hachinder Chish peak (7162.4 meters).

Hassanabad is located on the Karakoram Highway (N-35). In May 2022, the bridge across a tributary of the Hunza was destroyed by floodwaters.

== Constituency ==
Hassanabad is in constituency of GBLA-6. Hassanabad comes in district Hunza and tehsil Aliabad.

== Demographics ==
The village is home to around 200 families. Two of the old Hunza tribes are present in Hassanabad, Ganishkutz and Xhill Ganishkutz.

=== Notable people ===
- Amir Mehdi

== Gems ==
Hassnabad Nala is known for different precious and semi-precious stones. Most common gems are Corundum, Diamond and Sapphire.

== Hassanabad Power Complex ==
Gilgit-Baltistan Public works Department (GBPWD) manages Hassanabad Power Complex. Complex is a combination of Hydel and Thermal, Power generation plants.

- 1200KW Norwegian Unit (1994)
- 500KW Chinese Unit (2003)
- 200KW Chinese Unit (1991)
- 2X1000KW Diesel Generators (2007/2015)

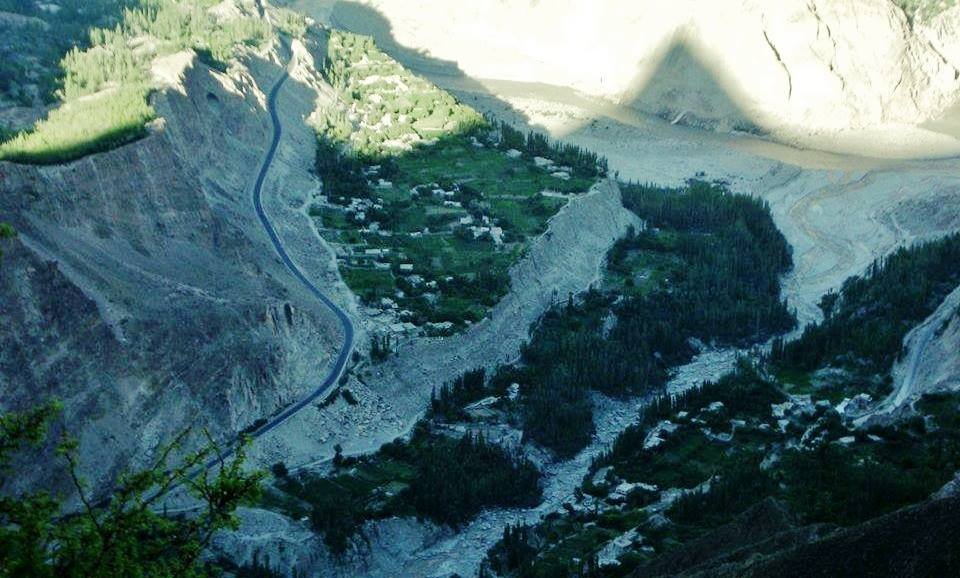
Aerial View of Hassanabad

== See also ==
- Karimabad

Media related to Hassanabad, Hunza at Wikimedia Commons
