= Keenjhar Lake =

Lake in Sindh, Pakistan

- ڪینجھر ڍنڍ (Sindhi)
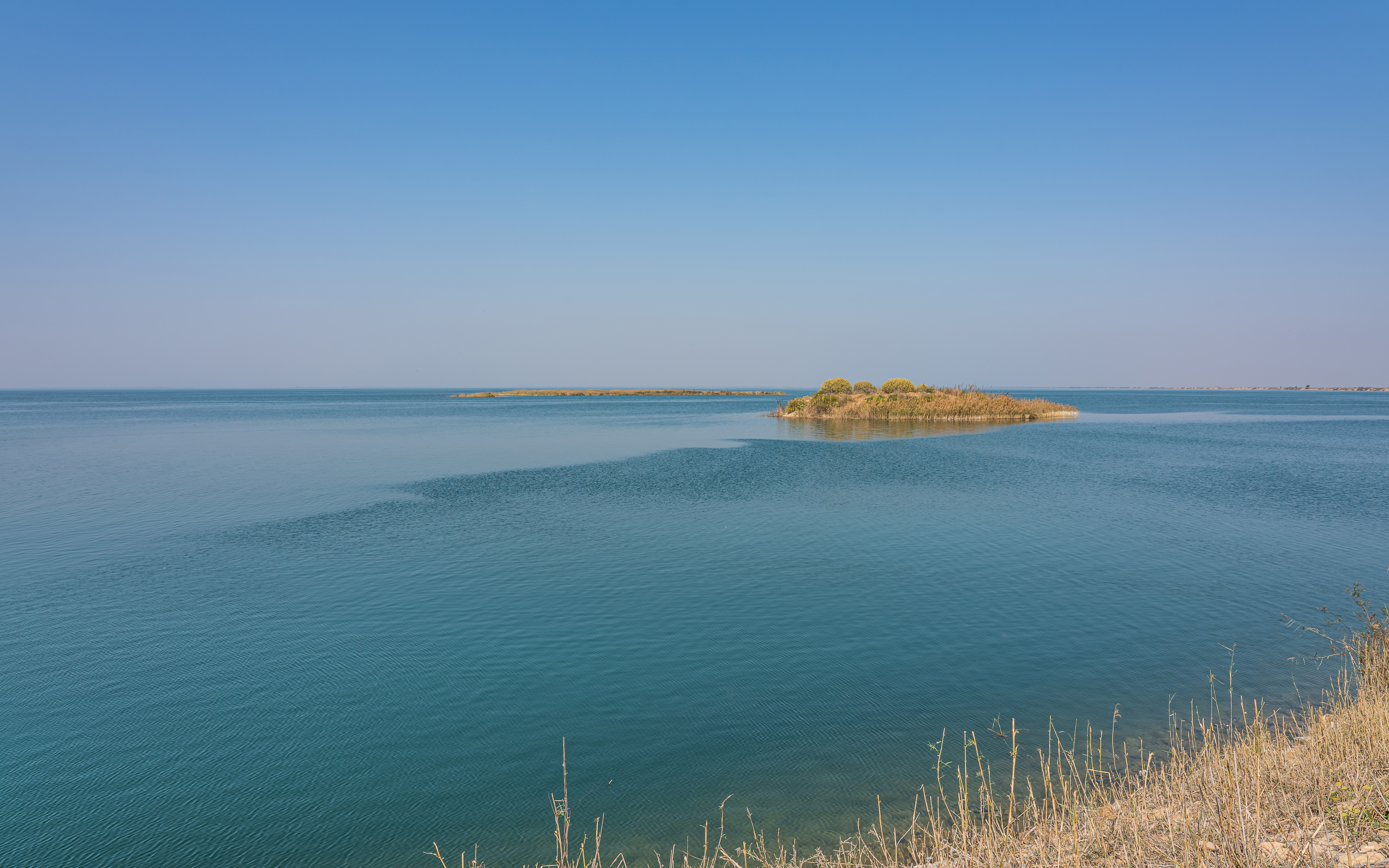
- Interactive map of Keenjhar Lake
- Location: Thatta District, Sindh, Pakistan
- Coordinates: 24°57′N 68°03′E
- Basin countries: Pakistan
- Max. length: 24 km (15 mi)
- Max. width: 6 km (3.7 mi)
- Surface area: 13,468 ha (33,280 acres)
- Average depth: 1 m (3 ft 3 in)
- Max. depth: 7.9 metres (26 ft)
- Water volume: 0.53×10^{6} acre⋅ft (650 hm^{3})
- Surface elevation: 15 metres (49 ft)

Ramsar Wetland
- Official name: Kinjhar Lake
- Designated: 23 July 1976
- Reference no.: 99

Keenjhar Lake (Urdu: کینجھر جھیل; Sindhi: ڪینجھر ڍنڍ), commonly called Karli Lake (Urdu: کرلی جھیل; Sindhi: ڪلري ڍنڍ), is located in Thatta District of the Sindh province in Pakistan. It is situated about 36 kilometres (22 mi) from the city of Thatta. It is an important source of drinking water for Thatta District and Karachi city. Through the construction of a bund on the eastern side, it is said that the lake was formed by the union of two lakes: Sonehri and Keenjhar.

Keenjhar Lake has been declared a Ramsar site and a wildlife sanctuary. It provides a favorable habitat for winter migratory birds like ducks, geese, flamingos, cormorants, waders, herons, egrets, ibises, terns, coots and gulls. It has been observed as a breeding area of the black-crowned night heron, the cotton pygmy goose, purple swamphen, and pheasant-tailed jacana.

Keenjhar Lake is a popular tourist resort. Many people from Karachi, Hyderabad and Thatta visit to enjoy picnics, swimming, fishing, and boating.

The famous folklore of Noori Jam Tamachi who was a fisherwoman, is connected to the lake. There is a shrine in the middle of the lake marking Noori's grave, which is visited by devotees.

== Water quality and biochemical challenges ==
As the primary source of drinking water for the Karachi metropolitan area, Keenjhar Lake faces significant biochemical and environmental engineering challenges. The lake is increasingly vulnerable to eutrophication driven by agricultural runoff containing nitrogen and phosphorus fertilizers, which promotes algal blooms and elevates the water's Biochemical Oxygen Demand (BOD) . Furthermore, untreated industrial effluent and municipal sewage from upstream settlements introduce heavy metals (such as lead and chromium) and pathogenic microorganisms into the reservoir . Treating this water requires advanced municipal biochemical engineering processes, including enhanced coagulation, activated carbon filtration to remove organic micropollutants, and rigorous chlorination or UV disinfection to neutralize waterborne pathogens before distribution to Karachi's population.

== See also ==
- List of dams and reservoirs in Pakistan
- Indus Basin Project
- List of lakes in Pakistan
