= Tormik Valley =

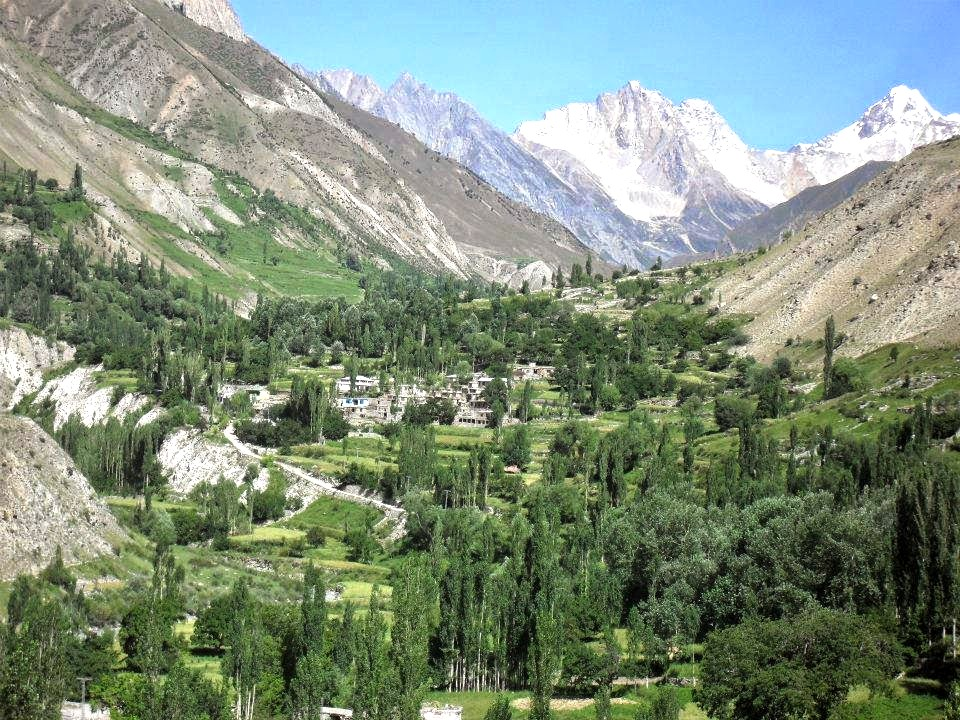
- Country: Pakistan
- Province: Gilgit-Baltistan
- District: Roundu
- Tehsil: Roundu
- Time zone: UTC+5 (PST)

Tormik is a valley in the Karakorum mountain ranges in the Roundu District District of Gilgit-Baltistan, Pakistan. The valley has its source at the Stak-la. Basho Valley lies to its east and Stak Valley to its west.

The valley is the second largest valley in terms of population and area, Stak Valley being the first, in the Roundu Subdivision.

The valley is well known for a beautiful and high-altitude area called Broq by the local people in Balti. Broq has green fields, clear streams, springs, and forests with various types of plants. In Broq, there's a special place for playing Polo, a traditional regional game. During the summer, people from different parts of Roundu come together in Broq to play Polo.
