= Ganga Lake (Pakistan) =

Lake in Bagh Valley, Azad Kashmir, Pakistan

- Location within Azad Kashmir
- Location: Bagh Valley, Azad Kashmir
- Coordinates: 34.074835°N 73.785767°E
- Basin countries: Pakistan
- Surface elevation: 2,942 m (9,652 ft)

Ganga Lake (Urdu:گنگا جھیل) or Ganga Sar is a high-altitude lake (2,942 metres (9,652 ft) located in the Bagh Valley, Azad Kashmir, Pakistan. It is near Ganga Choti Peak in the Himalayan (Pir Panjal) range. The lake is accessible from Bagh by a Jeep track.
