= Bandala Valley =

Valley in Pakistan–administered Kashmir

Coordinates: 33.066°N 74.176°E

Bandala is a valley located about 28 kilometres from Bhimber in Pakistan-administered Kashmir. The valley stretches from the Tawi River in the east to the Samahni Valley in the west. The Reech Pahari (Bear Mountain) runs parallel on the northern side and the Baghsar Mountain on the southern side. The valley is about 15 km long and about 1.5 kilometres wide.

Bandala joins the Samahni Valley at Sara e Saadabad and Chitti Mitti; further east are Pandori and Nali villages, the last villages before the Line of Control. Many streams flow through the valley, producing cascades, rapids, falls and natural swimming pools. These pools are popular among local youths not only for swimming but also for fishing. The fertile land and mild climate produce a variety of crops and trees, especially mango trees. Farming is still the major source of staple food for the area; wheat and corn are grown annually. The high literacy rate has improved the overall living standards of the people. Many local people work for the government or have taken employment overseas, especially in the Middle East and Europe. Therefore, dependence on farming for living has greatly reduced, but people still cultivate the land for food for their own use.

The weather is cold from October to March, sometimes falling below zero. From April onwards it remains mild until May. During June, July and August it becomes warmer, with temperatures reaching 35°C.

Many birds and animals are found in the valley, including peacocks, partridges, quail, falcons and eagles. The enclosing Reech Pahari serves as a sanctuary for many animal species, including leopards, hyenas, wolves, jackals, foxes, pythons, monkeys and deer. The valley is home to many hamlets, of which Bandi, Pind, Gurah, Piana, Parati, Kahawalian, Bagh Chagah Jandala and Penga are the best known.
