= Khanpur, Lower Dir =

Khanpur
- Union Council
- Country: Pakistan
- Province: Khyber Pakhtunkhwa
- District: Lower Dir
- Time zone: UTC+5 (PST)

Khanpur is a union council in Lower Dir, Khyber Pakhtunkhwa, Pakistan.

Lower Dir District has 37 union councils with a population of 797,852, according to the 1998 census report.

== See also ==
- Lower Dir District
