= Mansehra (disambiguation) =

Mansehra is a city in Khyber Pakhtunkhwa, Pakistan.

Mansehra may also refer to:

- Mansehra District, a district of Khyber Pakhtunkhwa, Pakistan
- Mansehra Tehsil, a tehsil of Mansehra district
- Mansehra (Rural), a union council in Mansehra District

== See also ==
- Mansehra Rock Edicts, fourteen rock edicts of Mauryan emperor Ashoka
- Mansehra Jihad training camp, an Afghan jihad camp.
