= Shadore =

Village in Khyber Pakhtoonkhwa

Shadore Shadoor
- Village
- Location in Pakistan
- Coordinates: 34°30′21.68″N 73°4′25.11″E
- Country: Pakistan
- Province: Khyber Pakhtoonkhwa
- District: Mansehra District
- Tehsil: Oghi
- Time zone: UTC+5 (PST)

Shadore (Urdu: شدوڑ Urdu pronunciation: [ʃədɔːɽ]) is a village in the Khyber Pakhtunkhwa province of Pakistan. It is located in Union Council Shamdarra, in Oghi Tehsil of Mansehra District.

== Languages ==
The main language of this village is Hindko.

== Pictures ==
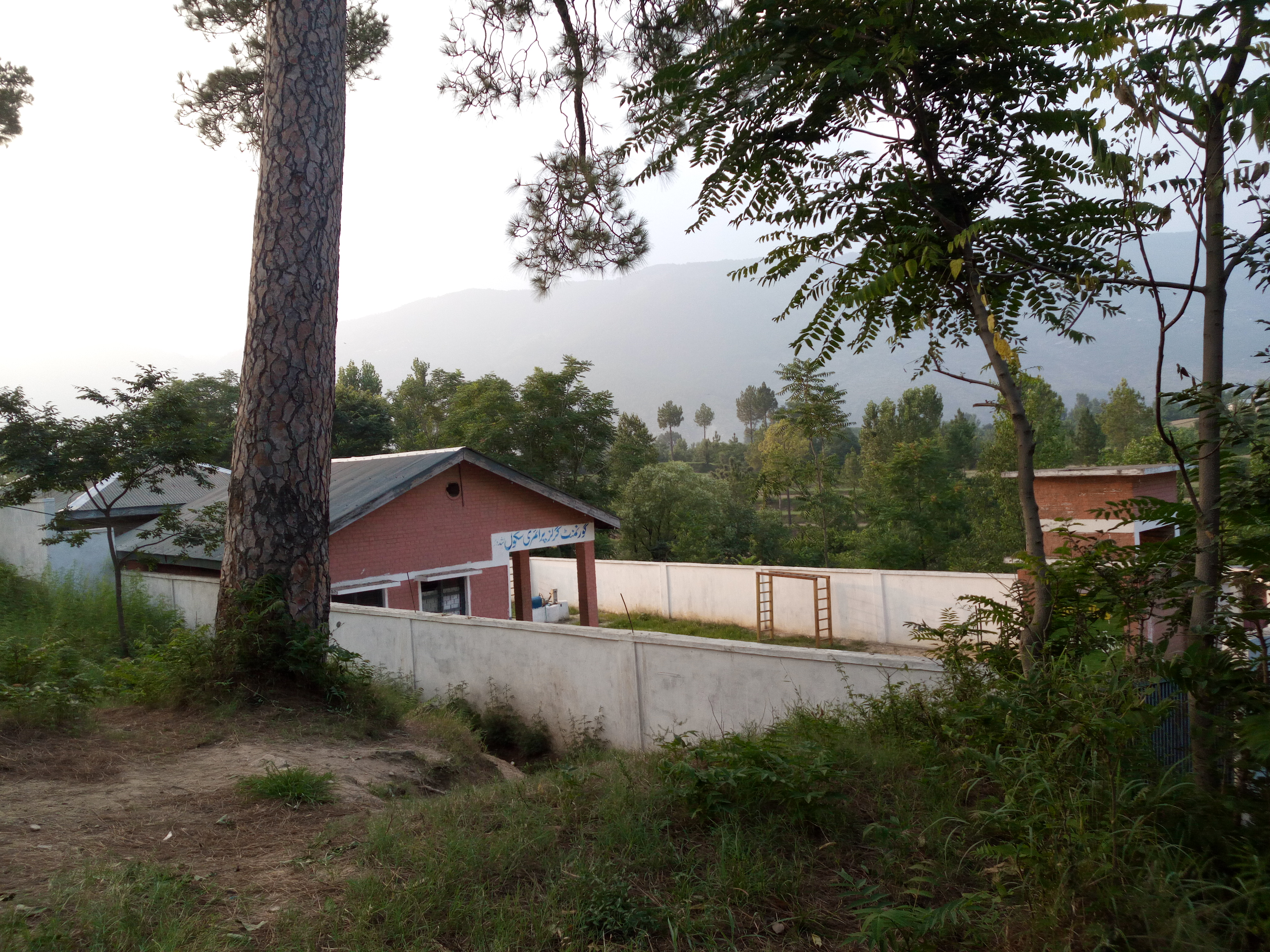
Government Primary School for Girls

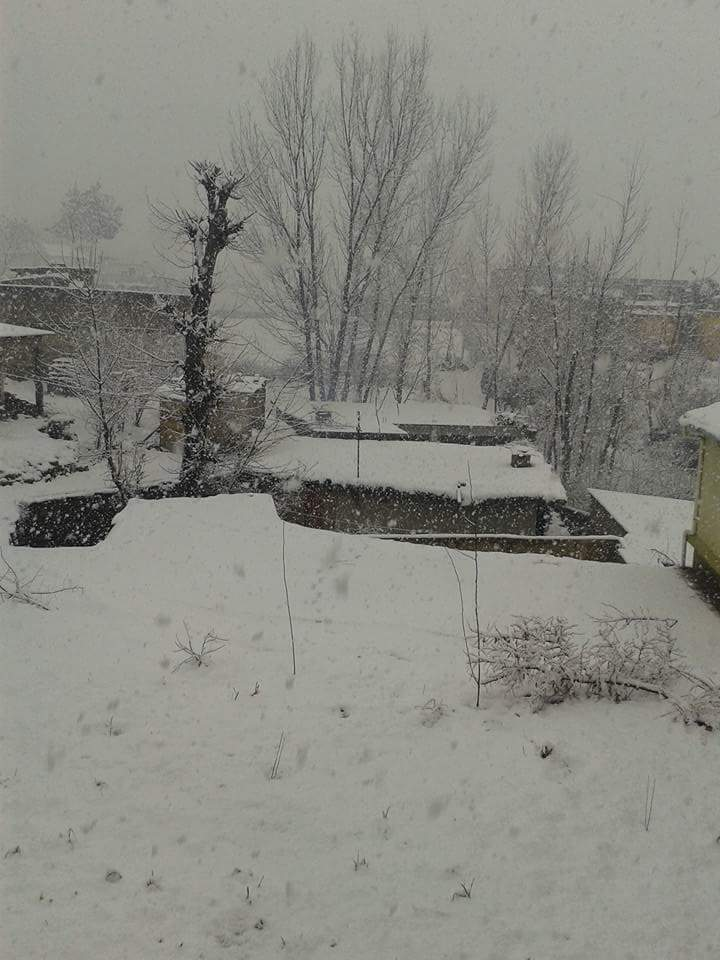
Snowfall in Shadore
