= Swatiabad =

Swatiabad سواتی آباد
- Village
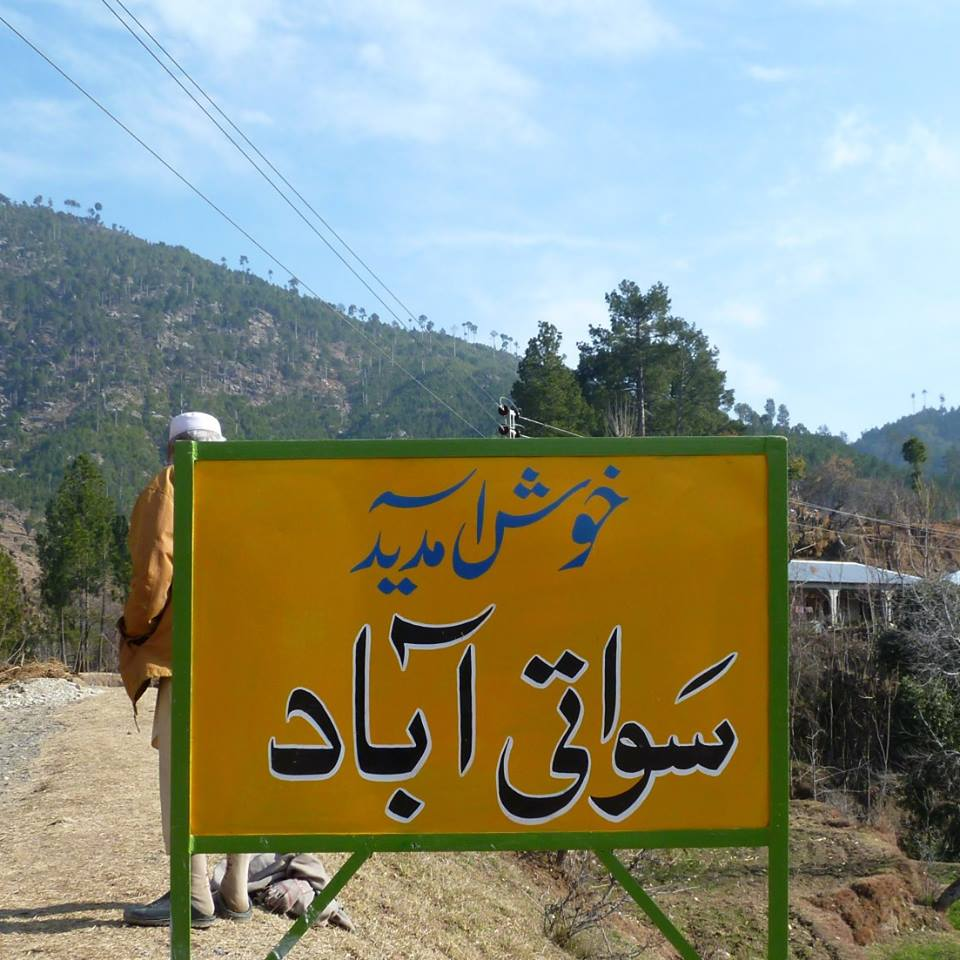
- A Swatiabad sign
- Interactive map of Swatiabad
- Location within Khyber Pakhtunkhwa Location within Pakistan Location within Asia
- Coordinates: 34.5282°N 73.1010°E

Swatiabad “سواتی آباد” is a village in Kathai union council, Tehsil Oghi, (an administrative subdivision) of Mansehra District in Khyber Pakhtunkhwa province of Pakistan. 9.2 km from main city of Oghi on Battal Road, It lies in an area affected by the 2005 Balkot earthquake. 34°31'42.35" N 73°06'04.19" E

Haji Habib Gull and his brothers Mohammed Gull, Mohammed Zaman, and Sher Zaman, were the first settlers, who Migrated from Bana Allai Valley District Battagram to Khabbal and then to Swatiabad in the late Eighteen Century.

Swatiabad is 2 km from the main Town of Kathai and is surrounded by 6 villages Syeed Abad, Usmana Abad, Koga, Faqar Mera, Changri, and Lama Naka.

Jamia Masjid Al-Habib in Swatiabad was a vision of Haji Habib Gull, The Masjid was Allhamdulliah Constructed and Established in 2011 by His Grandson.

The Village of Swatiabad is the native village of the Swati Tribe inhabiting the Hazara region in the Khyber Pakhtunkhwa province and the Provincially Administered Tribal Areas of Pakistan, mostly in the districts of Mansehra and Allai/Batagram, and to some extent in Kohistan as well, The Swatis are the largest tribal group of land owners in Mansehra and Battagram. Most of the Swatis speak Pashto, but many can also speak Hindko. Dari Persian was the official language of the Jahangiri sultans belonging to the Swati tribe, who ruled a kingdom stretching from Jalalabad and Bajaur to Kashmir, however, it is no longer spoken now.
