= Shah Khail Garhi =

Shah Khail Garhi شاہ خیل گڑھی
- Country: Pakistan
- Province: Khyber Pakhtunkhwa
- Division: Hazara division
- District: Mansehra
- Tehsil: Mansehra
- Pakistan Post Code: 21300

Shah Khail Garhi is the village located in Mansehra, Khyber Pakhtunkhwa, Pakistan.

== See also ==
- Peeran
- Maira Amjad Ali
