= Chater Plain =

Chattar Plain
- Union council and town
- Country: Pakistan
- Region: Khyber-Pakhtunkhwa
- District: Mansehra District
- Time zone: UTC+5 (PST)

Chattar Plain is a Union Council (an administrative subdivision) of Mansehra District in Khyber-Pakhtunkhwa province of Pakistan. It is part of Mansehra Tehsil and is located in an area that was affected by the 2005 Kashmir earthquake. Land Lords of Chattar Plain belongs to Swatis and Sadaat Family. It is the highest plain point in the mountain regions starting from abbottabad to gilgit.

Zar Muhammad Khan Arghushal Swati is the elected Chairman of VC Sharkolai in UC Chattar Plain.
