= Kangarh =

- Village
- Country: Pakistan
- Province: Khyber Pakhtunkhwa
- Elevation: 1,200 m (3,900 ft)

Population
  - Total: 300 (approx.)

Kangarh (also written as Kan Garh or Kanger) is a town near the Upper Tanawal valley in the Khyber Pakhtunkhwa province of Pakistan.

== See also ==
- Oghi (tehsil)
- Kala Dhaka
- Mansehra District
