= Mian Zia ur Rehman =

Pakistani politician

MPA Mian Zia ur Rehman

Member of the Khyber Pakhtunkhwa Assembly
- In office 13 August 2018 – 5 December 2018
- Succeeded by: Ahmed Hussain Shah
- Constituency: PK-30 (Mansehra-I)
- In office 31 May 2013 – May 2018
- Constituency: PK-54 (Mansehra-II)

Personal details
- Party: Pakistan Muslim League (N)
- Occupation: Politician

Mian Zia ur Rehman is a Pakistani politician from Mansehra District. He is a former member of the Khyber Pakhtunkhwa Assembly belong to the Pakistan Muslim League (N). He also served as a member of different committees.

== Political career ==
Mian was elected to the Khyber Pakhtunkhwa Assembly as a candidate of Pakistan Muslim League (N) (PML-N) from PK-54 (Mansehra-II) in the 2013 Pakistani general election.

He was re-elected to the Khyber Pakhtunkhwa Assembly as a candidate of PML-N from Constituency PK-30 (Mansehra-I) in the 2018 Pakistani general election.

In October 2018, The Supreme Court of Pakistan disqualified him as member of the Khyber Pakhtunkhwa Assembly for contesting elections with a fake degree.
