= Bandi Shungli =

Bandi Shungli شنگلی بانڈی
- Union Council and Town
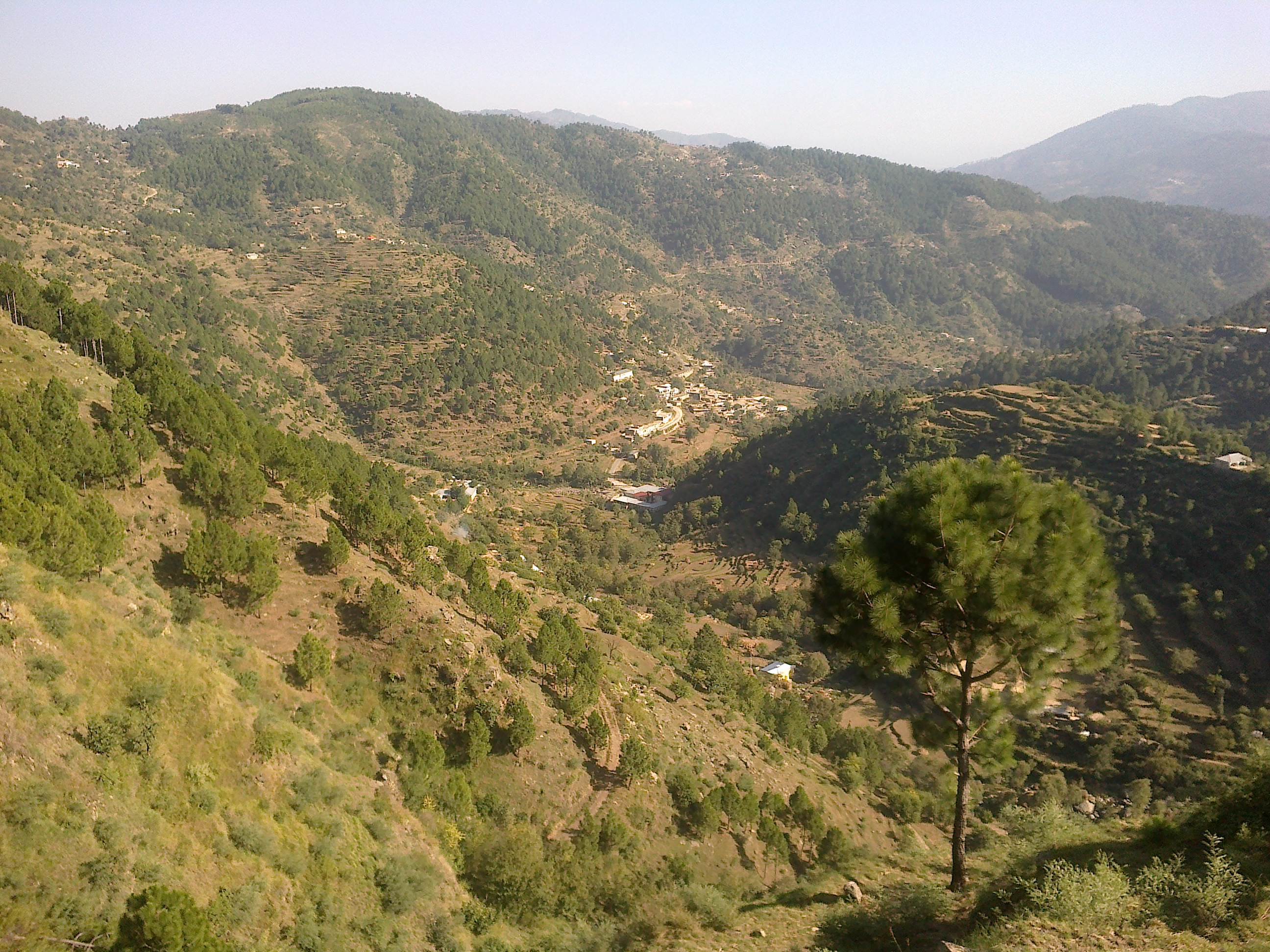

- Location in Pakistan Bandi Shungli (Pakistan)
- Coordinates: 34.483°N 72.932°E
- Country: Pakistan
- Region: Khyber Pakhtunkhwa
- District: Mansehra District
- Tehsil: Oghi

Government
  - Type: Union Council
- Time zone: UTC+5 (PST)
- Area code: 997

Bandi Shungli, or Shungli Bandi (Gojri: شنگلی بانڈی), is a village and union council of Oghi Tehsil in Mansehra District in the north-east of the Khyber Pakhtunkhwa province of Pakistan.

== Demographics ==
The main languages of the region are Hindko, Gojri, and Pashto. In the village of Danna the endangered Mankiyali language is spoken.

There is one government Higher Secondary School for boys and one middle school for boys and girls.

Nearly all the population is of the Sunni sect.

== Settlements ==
Major villages include: Shungli, Gali, Patean, Sunj, Kaladakha, Harian, Temarthaarha, Utli Bai, Tarli Bai, Keela, Galdar, Chontra, Chatha, Porian, Danna, Shoshni, Chemrasi, Nawan Sher, Arghina, Basengarh, Jubberh, Naka, Foghorah, Pubbal, Neel Battla Bala, Malkana, Chakal, bandi, dhok. Takiya the most prominent and significant icon of Bandi Shungli.
