= Oghi Tehsil =

Tehsil of Mansehra District, Pakistan

Coordinates: 34°30′19.78″N 73°1′54.02″E

Oghi Tehsil تحصیل اوگئی اوګي تحصیل
- Tehsil
- Administrative subdivisions of Mansehra District.
- Country: Pakistan
- Province: Khyber Pakhtunkhwa
- District: Mansehra
- Founded: 1986

Government
  - Chairman: Nawabzada Hiasam Salah Uddin (PTI)

Population (2023)
  - Total: 251,533
- Time zone: UTC+5 (PST)
- Number of towns: 1

Oghi is a tehsil of Mansehra District, in the Hazara Division of Khyber Pakhtunkhwa province, Pakistan. Its territory largely coincides with the Agror Valley, and its headquarters is the town of Oghi. Oghi tehsil was established in 1986. Prior to that, this area was part of Mansehra Tehsil.

The tehsil is made up of the following union councils: Oghi, Belian, Dilbori, Kathai, Karori, Shamdhara, Shergarh, and Shungli Bandi. In August 2017, the three union councils of Darband, Nika Pani and Shanaya were separated to form the new tehsil of Darband.

== Demographics ==
According to the 2023 national census, the total population of Oghi Tehsil was 251,533. The three major languages were Hindko (44.41%, 111,719), Pashto (41.57%, 104,563) and Kohistani (3.13%, 7,876), respectively.

The major social groups include Tanoli, Swathi, Syed, Yousafzai and Gujar. The predominant languages are Hindko and Pashto, but there is a sizeable group of speakers of Gojri. Most of the area is arid or rain-fed. The main economics activities are agriculture, forestry and livestock production.
