= Zahoor Ahmad =

Pakistani politician

Member of the Provincial Assembly of Khyber Pakhtunkhwa
- In office 29 May 2013 – 28 May 2018
- Constituency: Constituency PK-53 (Mansehra-I)

Personal details
- Party: PMLN

Zahoor Ahmad is a Pakistani politician who was a member of the Provincial Assembly of Khyber Pakhtunkhwa, from May 2013 to May 2018.

== Early life and education ==
He was born in Jangalan village of UC Peeran in Mansehra District. He has a Bachelors of Arts degree.

== Political career ==
2002 General Elections

He ran for the seat of the Provincial Assembly of the North-West Frontier Province as an independent candidate for Constituency PF-53 (Mansehra-I) in the 2002 Pakistani general election but was unsuccessful. He received 5,383 votes and lost the seat to Muhammad Shujah Khan Swati, an independent candidate.

2008 General Elections

He ran for the seat of the Provincial Assembly of the North-West Frontier Province as a candidate of Pakistan Peoples Party for Constituency PF-53 (Mansehra-I) in the 2008 Pakistani general election but was unsuccessful. He received 12,278 votes and lost the seat to Muhammad Shujah Khan Swati, an independent candidate who secured 25,858 votes. In this election Babar Saleem Jehangiri Swati stood second by securing 12,504 votes. The "Khan(نواب) of Mansehra City" Tariq Khan Jehangiri Swati stood fourth by securing 8013 votes.

2013 General Elections

He was elected to the Provincial Assembly of Khyber Pakhtunkhwa as an independent candidate for Constituency PK-53 (Mansehra-I) in the 2013 Pakistani general election. He stood first by receiving 21,991 votes, Muhammad Shujah Khankhail Swati stood second by receiving 17,229 votes and Babar Saleem Jehangiri Swati stood third by receiving 12,944 votes. In this election Khurram Khan Jehangiri Swati, a cousin of Babar Saleem Swati stood fourth by securing 10614 votes while Habibullah Khankhail Swati, 10th Chief of Swati tribe and a cousin of Shuja Khankhail Swati stood fifth by securing 7087 votes.

2018 General Elections

In the 2018 elections he lost his seat to Babar Saleem Jehangiri Swati of Pakistan tehreek Insaf by a short margin.

2024 General Elections

He again lost the seat to Babar Saleem Khan Swati by a margin of 15000 votes.
