= PK-37 Mansehra-II =

Pakistani electoral district

- Constituency for the Khyber Pakhtunkhwa Assembly
- Region: Mansehra Tehsil (partly) including Mansehra city in Mansehra District

Current constituency
- Party: Pakistan Tehreek-e-Insaf
- Member: Babar Saleem Swati
- Created from: PK-53 Mansehra-I (before 2018) PK-31 Mansehra-II (2018-2022)

PK-37 Mansehra-II (پی کے-37 مانسہرہ-2) is a constituency for the Khyber Pakhtunkhwa Assembly of the Khyber Pakhtunkhwa province of Pakistan.

== MPAs ==
1977 : Sarfraz Khan

1985 : Babar Naseem Khan Swati

1990 : Babar Naseem Khan Swati

1993 : Tariq Khan Swati

1995 : Tariq Khan Swati

1997 : Tariq Khan Swati

2002 : Muhammad Shuja Khan Swati

2008 : Muhammad Shuja Khan Swati

2013 : Sardar Zahoor Ahmed

2018 : Babar Saleem Khan Swati

2024 : Babar Saleem Khan Swati

== See also ==
- PK-36 Mansehra-I
- PK-38 Mansehra-III
