= Maira Amjad Ali =

- Union Council and Town
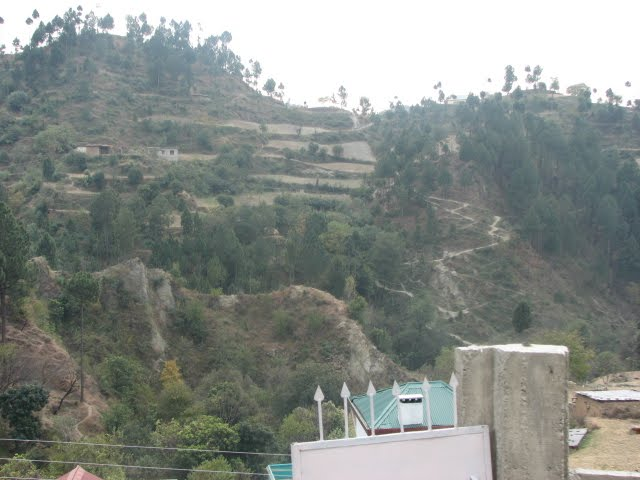
- Interactive map of Maira Amjad Ali
- Coordinates: 34°21′11″N 73°18′15″E
- Country: Pakistan
- Region: Khyber-Pakhtunkhwa
- District: Mansehra District
- Elevation: 1,330 m (4,360 ft)

Population
  - Total: Appx. 3,000
- Time zone: UTC+5 (PST)
- Postal code: 23100
- Area code: 0997

Maira Amjad Ali is a village in the Mansehra district of Khyber Pakhtunkhwa, Pakistan. It is part of Union Council Peeran of tehsil Mansehra. The village has a population of approximately 3,000 people. It is located 10 kilometres away from Attar Shisha and 6 kilometres from Sandesar, from where its road diverges from the Kaghan Highway (N15).

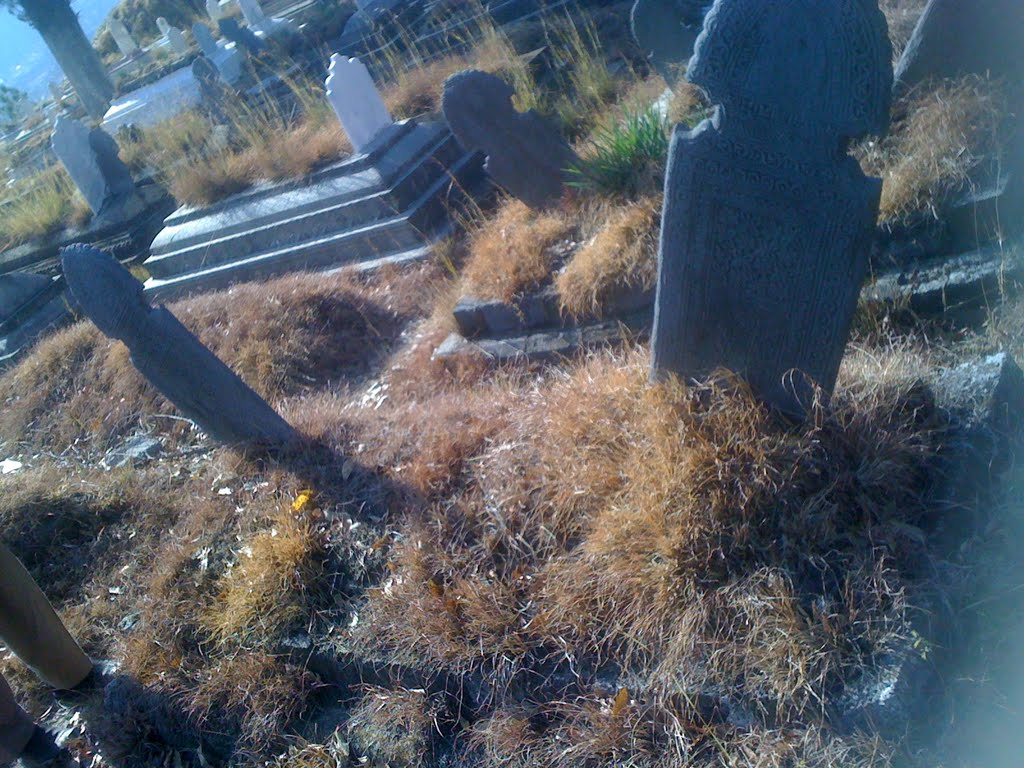
Maira Amjad Ali graveyard

== History ==
According to legend, Qutb Shah (Persian: قطب شاه) was a ruler of Herat and a general in the army of Sultan Mahmud of Ghazni.

Historical sources attest that the Khorasan and Herat were under the rule of King Nuh III of Samanids, the seventh of the Samanid line—at the time of Sebük Tigin and his older son, Sultan Mahmud Ghaznavi.

The governor of Herāt was a noble by the name of 'Faik', who governed on behalf of King Nuh III. Faik was a powerful, but insubordinate governor of Nuh III; and had been punished by Nuh III. Faik made overtures to Bogra Khan and Ughar Khan of Khorasan. Bogra Khan answered Faik's call, came to Herāt and became its master. This person, Faik, had nothing to do with any fictitious 'Qutb Shah'. No real proof exists anywhere of the actual existence of any such individual.

In 994, Nuh III invited Alp Tigin to come to his aid. Alp Tigin, along with Mahmud of Ghazni, defeated Faik and annexed Herāt, Nishapur and Tous.

It is claimed in legend and folklore that Qutub Shah and nine of his sons accompanied and assisted Sultan Mahmud Ghazni in his early eleventh-century conquests; of what today forms parts of Afghanistan, Iran, Pakistan and Northern India, who, according to tribal traditions, settled primarily in the Salt Range.

NOTABLE PEOPLE from AWAN tribe in Pakistan.

Notable people

Nawab Malik Amir Mohammad Khan, former Nawab of Kalabagh, Chief of the Awan tribe, Governor of West Pakistan from 1960 to 1966

Air Marshal Nur Khan, Commander in Chief of the Pakistan Air Force, 1965–69, Governor of West Pakistan, 1969–70

and recipient of the Hilal-i-Jurat, the second-highest military award of Pakistan.

[10]Mir Sultan Khan – A chess master also believed by some to be the greatest natural chess player of modern times.

[11]Ahmad Nadeem Qasmi – Urdu poet, journalist, literary critic, dramatist, short story author, recipient of the Pride of Performance and Sitara-e-Imtiaz, the third-highest civil award of Pakistan.

[12]Sultan Bahu – A Sufi mystic, poet, scholar and founder of mystic tradition known as Sarwari Qadiri.

[13]Khadim Hussain Rizvi – A Pakistani Islamic scholar and the founder of Tehreek-e-Labbaik Pakistan.

[14]Ameer Muhammad Akram Awan – Islamic scholar and spiritual leader of the mystic tradition known as Naqshbandia Owaisiah.

[15]Abdul Mannan Wazirabadi – Islamic scholar, jurist and muhaddith.

[16]Dilip Kumar – An actor in Hindi cinema.

== Geography ==
The village is located on a plateau wedged between the Chowki mountains on the northeast side and the Sarjool top on its southwest. A small stream runs through the base of these hills toward the nearby hamlet of Samian. The average height of the village is 4,304 feet (1311 metres) above sea level. The subsoil is mainly mixed rocky clay. It is 17 kilometres from the nearby city of Mansehra and 29 kilometres from Balakot.

== Demography ==
The village's population is approximately 3,000, with the predominant religion being Islam. Ethnically, the people identify themselves with various tribes including the Awans, Gujjars, Kashmiris, Rajputs and Swatis. Suleman Khel sulemani (RAJPUT malik)

== Governance ==
The village is part of the Union Council Peeran of District Mansehra.

== Educational facilities ==
The village is served by separate primary, middle and high schools for girls and boys. There is no privately run schools, and it also has an NGO funded school running under TCF International, constructed after the devastating 2005 earthquake.

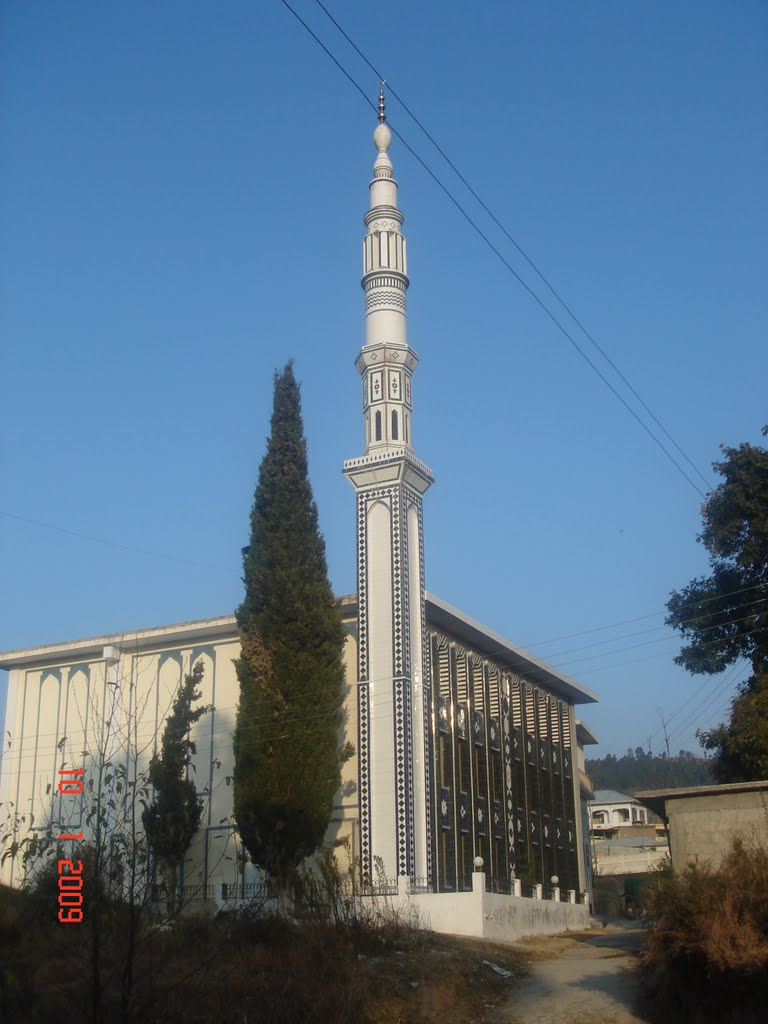
Maira Amjad Ali Mosque

== Religious sites ==
The village has a large, triple storied, newly constructed Jamia mosque called the "Jamia Masjid Siddique-e-Akbar (R.A)" with a spacious hall and a tall minaret, visible from quite some distance. There is a traditional religious seminary in the mosque. The old mosque has also been converted into a separate seminary for girls.

== Commercial facilities ==
The traditional parking lot (adda) is surrounded by 15 to 20 shops which provide basic amenities. It is also served by a branch of the state-run utility stores. Most of the items of daily use are brought from the nearby city of Mansehra to which it is connected by road.
