= Sum Alahi Mong =

- Village and union council
- Country: Pakistan
- Region: Khyber-Pakhtunkhwa
- District: Mansehra District

Government
  - visionary: Shahzada Muhammad Gushtasap Khan
  - chairman: Shahzada Umer Haroon Khan
- Time zone: UTC+5 (PST)

Sum Alahi Mang (or Sum Ellahi Mang) is a village and union council (an administrative subdivision) of Mansehra District in Khyber-Pakhtunkhwa province of Pakistan. The people of SUM ELAHI MANG speak a different languages which includes Urdu, Hindko, Gojri, Kohistani and Pashto. The majority areas speak Hinko Gojri and Kohistani whereas Urdu is understood throughout the area.
