= Agror Valley =

Valley in Pakistan

Agror Valley is located in the Hazara region of the Khyber Pakhtunkhwa province of northern Pakistan. The valley is located within Oghi Tehsil, an administrative subdivision of Mansehra District. The Khans of Agror, belonging to the Begal subsection of Mitravi Swatis had ruled this area following the 1703 conquest of Pakhli. Pashto is the main language of the Agror Valley. Wajhi Uz Zaman Khan Swati is the current hereditary "Khan of Agror".

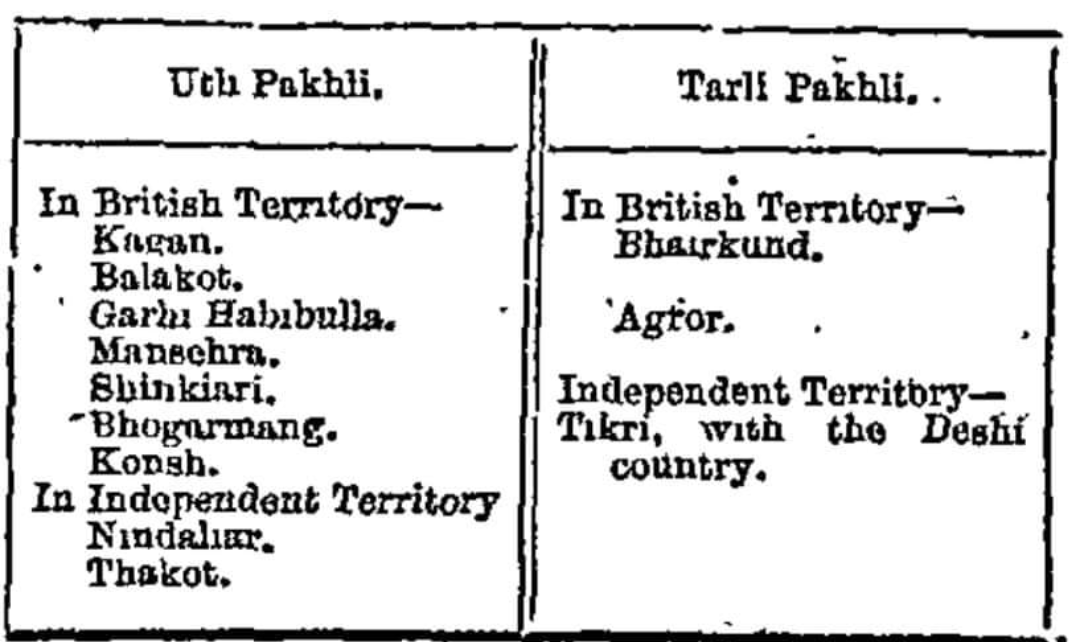
Page 73 of Hazara Gazetteer-1883 showing the areas of Pakhli which are now divided into many new tehsils. Pakhli was named after Sultan Pakhal Swati.

The valley consists of three mountain glens, 10 miles (16 km) in length and 6 miles (9.7 km) in breadth, located between 34°29′N 72°58′E and 34°35′N 75°9′E.

== Environment ==
The lower portions of Agror Valley are heavily cultivated and contain many villages and hamlets. The valley area has few strictly level spaces, but consists of terraced flats, and water is abundant year-round.

== Population ==
The main tribe are Swatis, Tanolis, Gujars, Yousafzais, Syeds, Azizwani, Akhoon Khels, and Awan.

== History ==
Agror is mentioned in old and ancient texts - in the Rajatarangini, written by Kashmiri historian Kalhana, it is known as Atyugrapura and in the works of Ptolemy it is the Ιθάγονρος (Ithágonros) town in Ούαρσα (Oúarsa).

=== Modern History ===
From the time of Timur until the beginning of the eighteenth century the Agror valley was held by a family of Karlugh Turks. These were expelled in 1703 by a Saiyid named Jalal Baba, and the conquered country was divided among the Swatis, one Mullah Ahmad Sad-ud-din, who died in 1783, rising to the position of self proclaimed Khan of Agror and other are swatis Khans of Shamdhara. The Nawab of Amb Sardar Ghazi Painda Khan Tanoli captured the valley in 1834, but after seven years in 1841 it was restored by the Sikhs to Ata Muhammad, a descendant of Sad-ud-din. At annexation Atā Muhammad was recognized as chief of Agror, and the defence and management of this part of the frontier was originally left to him; but the arrangement did not work satisfactorily. An expedition had to be sent in 1852 to avenge the murder of two officers of the Salt department; and in consequence of the unsatisfactory attitude of the chief and of repeated complaints by the cultivators, it was resolved in 1868 to place a police station in Agror and to bring the valley more directly under the administration of Government. This incensed the Khan, at whose instigation the newly-built police station was burnt by a raid of the Black Mountain tribes . An expedition was dispatched, and Atā Muhammad was deported to Lahore for a time, but in 1870 reinstated in his chieftainship. His son and successor, Ali Gauhar, was removed from the valley in 1888 in consequence of his abetting raids into British territory. In order to maintain the peace of the border, expeditions were dispatched against the Black Mountain tribes in 1888, 1891, and 1892; and there has since been no disturbance.

Agror being a small and isolated valley, lying at the foot of the Black Mountain and separated from the rest of the Hazara District by a range of hills, meant that its chiefs had the opportunity to go against the British authorities - this was described in colonial records as "repeated misbehaviour" and had allied with the tribes of neighbouring territories. In 1888 the Khan was arrested and deported, and in 1891 a Regulation (IV of 1891) was passed, declaring that he had been guilty of disturbing the peace of the border, and that all his rights in the valley were forfeited to the Government. The Regulation also provided for the appointment of an officer to deal with the forfeited rights, to determine how far they should be retained by Government, transferred to persons having interests in the land or to the Khan's kinsmen, or restored to the Khan.

The Agror Valley Regulation (1891) later formally declared the rights of the Khan of Agror to be forfeit to Government.

The land reforms of the valley was assessed by the Sikhs at Rs. 1,515. This demand was continued on annexation and raised to Rs. 3,315 in 1853 and Rs. 4,000 at the regular settlement, in which the engagement was made with the Khan. The settlement was revised in 1901.

During British rule, the sole manufacture of the valley was cotton cloth, and trade was purely local, except for a small export of grain. The chief place in the valley was the village of Oghi, the headquarters of the Hazara border military police.
