= Pairan =

Pairan may refer to:

- Peeran, village in Mansehra District, Khyber-Pakhtunkhwa province, Pakistan
- Payra-sur-l'Hers, commune in Aude department, France
- Failan, 2001 South Korean film
