= Ahmed Hussain Shah =

Pakistani politician

Member of the Provincial Assembly of Khyber Pakhtunkhwa
- In office 15 March 2019 – 18 January 2023
- Preceded by: Mian Zia ur Rehman
- Constituency: PK-30 (Mansehra-I)

Personal details
- Party: PTI-P (2023-present)
- Other political affiliations: PTI (2019-2023); PPP (2008-2019)

Ahmed Hussain Shah is a Pakistani politician who had been a member of the Provincial Assembly of Khyber Pakhtunkhwa from March 2019 till January 2023.

== Political career ==
Shah started his political career with Pakistan Peoples Party. His father Muzammil Shah was also a senior politician and was a close aide to PPP founder Zulfikar Ali Bhutto. He first won provincial assembly seat in the 2008 general elections and remained Provincial Minister for Industry and Commerce in Awami National Party's coalition government. He lost next two general elections, 2013 and 2018, consecutively, both as a candidate of the PPP.

He then joined the Pakistan Tehreek-e-Insaf (PTI) after the disqualification of Pakistan Muslim League (N) (PML(N)) MPA Mian Zia ur Rehman.

Shah contested the subsequent by-election on 26 February 2019 from PK-30 (Mansehra-I) as a candidate of the PTI. He won the election with a majority of 6,493 votes over the runner up Mazhar Qasim of PML(N). He garnered 46,438 votes while Qasim received 39,945 votes.

He left Pakistan Tehreek Insaf following the May 9 riots and joined Pakistan Tehreek Insaf Parliamentarians.

Shah contested the 2024 Pakistani general election as a candidate of Pakistan Tehreek Insaf Parliamentarian and lost seat to PTI-backed Independent candidate Munir Lughmani Swati. Munir Lughmani Swati secured 35074 votes while Shah secured 12356 votes.
