= Jabori hydro power project =

The Jabori Hydro Power project is a planned hydro power project, currently under construction in the Jabori District of Mansehra, KPK, Pakistan.
