= Swan Miara =

- Village and union council
- Country: Pakistan
- Region: Khyber-Pakhtunkhwa
- District: Mansehra District
- Time zone: UTC+5 (PST)

Swan Miara (ساون میرا) is a village and union council (an administrative subdivision) of Mansehra District in Khyber-Pakhtunkhwa province of Pakistan. It is located in the south of the district where it borders Abbottabad District.

Formerly it was a part of the Princely State of Amb.
