= Daud Shah, Mansehra =

Pakistani town

Daud Shah
- Union council and town
- Country: Pakistan
- Region: Khyber Pakhtunkhwa
- District: Mansehra District
- Time zone: UTC+5 (PST)

Daud Shah is a village and union council (an administrative subdivision) of Mansehra District in Khyber Pakhtunkhwa province of Pakistan.
