= Trangi Sabir Shah =

- Village and union council
- Country: Pakistan
- Region: Khyber-Pakhtunkhwa
- District: Mansehra District
- Time zone: UTC+5 (PST)

Trangi Sabir Shah (or Trangri Sabir Shah) is a village and union council (an administrative subdivision) of Mansehra District in Khyber-Pakhtunkhwa province of Pakistan. It is located to the north of the district capital Mansehra.
