= Oghi, Pakistan =

Oghi Area of Lower Pakhli
- Town and union council
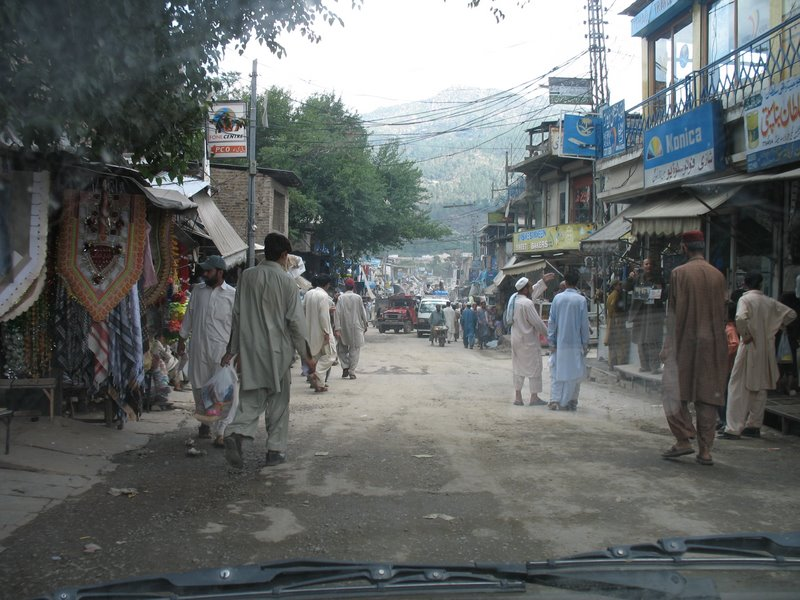
- Oghi Market

- Location in Pakistan
- Coordinates: 34°29′55″N 73°00′59″E
- Country: Pakistan
- Province: Khyber Pakhtoonkhwa
- District: Mansehra District
- Tehsil: Oghi
- Time zone: UTC+5 (PST)

Oghi (اوگی) is a town in District Mansehra of the Khyber Pakhtunkhwa province of Pakistan. Situated in the Agror Valley, it is the headquarters of the eponymous tehsil.

== History ==
During British rule it was the headquarters of Agror Valley (part of Hazara District) and served as the headquarters of the Hazara border military police.

In British colonial times, the town of Oghi, in the Agror valley, was the seat of the local chief, the Khan of Agror, of the Pashtun tribe, descended from one Akhund Saadudin. Following the disturbances by The Black Mountain (Tor Ghar) Tribes and campaign of 1888 this chiefdom was formally abolished by the government of British India; and subsequently, the chiefs were given a limited 'Jagir' grant in exile.
