= Kamal Ban National Park =

National park in Pakistan

- کمال بان نیشنل پارک
- Location: Mansehra District, Khyber Pakhtunkhwa, Pakistan
- Area: 5,456 acres (2,208 ha)
- Established: January 2022
- Manager: Provincial administration

The Kamal Ban National Park (Urdu: کمال بان نیشنل پارک) is a protected region located in the Mansehra District, Khyber Pakhtunkhwa, Pakistan.

== History ==
In January 2022, the provincial administration established Kamal Ban National Park as a national park, as part of its efforts to maintain and protect species and their respective habitats in a variety of ecosystems. This park is situated inside the Kaghan Forest Division and encompasses a total area of 5,456 acres.

== Controversies ==
The National Park is currently under the threat of a proposed de-notification. The Secretary to the Government of Khyber Pakhtunkhwa has submitted a summary to the Chief Minister advocating for the de-notification of the national park. However, this move has faced opposition from various stakeholders, who are concerned about its potentially adverse effects on the environment and wildlife.
