= Shergarh, Mansehra =

Shergarh Area of Lower Pakhli
- Village and union council
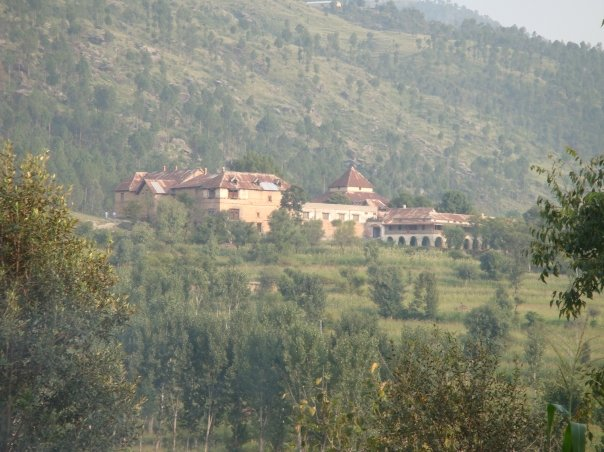
- Shergarh fort, former summer residence

- Location in Pakistan
- Coordinates: 34°27′24″N 72°59′18″E
- Country: Pakistan
- Province: Khyber Pakhtoonkhwa
- District: Mansehra District
- Tehsil: Oghi
- Elevation est.: 1,100 m (3,600 ft)
- Time zone: UTC+5 (PST)

Shergarh (شیرگڑھ) is a village and union council in Oghi Tehsil, Mansehra District, Khyber Pakhtunkhwa, Pakistan. It was once the summer capital of the former Tanawal princely state (also called Amb State and Tanawal).
