= Laber Kot =

LabarKot
- Village and union council
- Country: Pakistan
- Region: Khyber Pakhtunkhwa
- District: Mansehra District
- Time zone: UTC+5 (PST)

LabarKot is a village and union council (an administrative subdivision) of Mansehra District in the Khyber Pakhtunkhwa province of Pakistan. It is located in the south of the district and is to the north-east of Mansehra the district capital, in an area affected by the 2005 Kashmir earthquake.
