= Zahid Chanzeb =

Pakistani politician

Advisor To Chief Minister For Toursim,Culture, Archaeology & Museums on Khyber Pakhtunkhwa
- In office 7 March 2024 – 13 October 2025
- Governor: Haji Ghulam Ali; Faisal Karim Kundi
- Chief Minister: Ali Amin Gandapur

Member of the Provincial Assembly of Khyber Pakhtunkhwa
- Incumbent
- Assumed office 29 February 2024
- Constituency: PK-38 Mansehra-III

Personal details
- Born: Mansehra District, Khyber Pakhtunkhwa, Pakistan
- Party: PTI (2024-present)

Zahid Chanzeb Swati is a Pakistani politician from Mansehra District. He is currently serving as a member of the Provincial Assembly of Khyber Pakhtunkhwa since February 2024. Beside being a legislator, he is also the advisor to chief minister Khyber Pakhtunkhwa on tourism and culture. He belongs to the Alisheri subsection of the Mitravi Swati tribe.

== Career ==
He contested the 2024 general elections as a Pakistan Tehreek-e-Insaf/Independent candidate from PK-38 Mansehra-III. He secured 38,804 votes while the runner-up was Muhammad Naeem Tanoli of PML-N who secured 26,601 votes.
