= Babar Saleem Swati =

Pakistani politician

- خان بابر سلیم خان سواتی
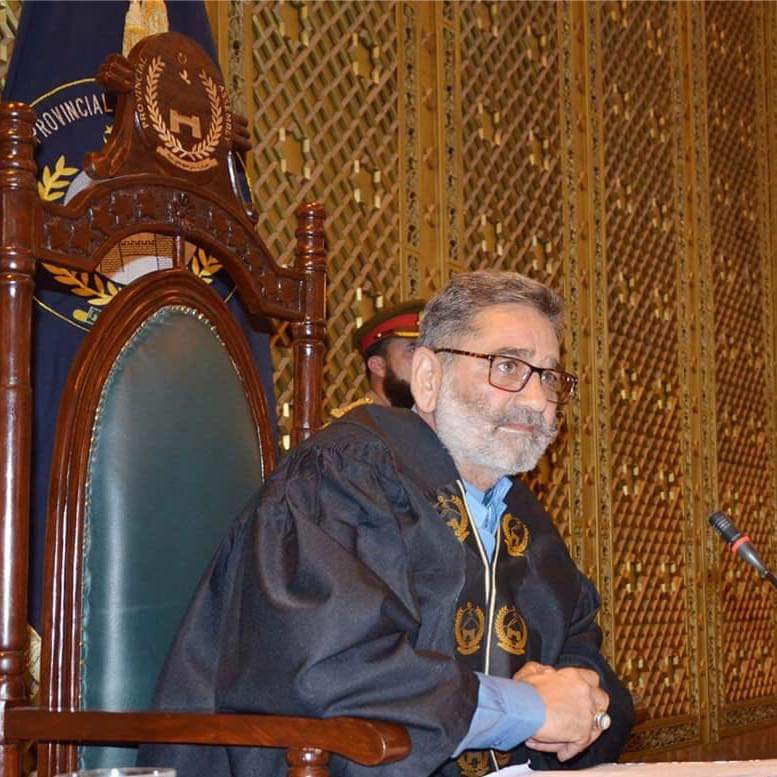

8th Khan of Mansehra

Speaker of the Provincial Assembly of Khyber Pakhtunkhwa
- Incumbent
- Assumed office 29 February 2024
- Deputy: Suraya Bibi
- Preceded by: Mushtaq Ahmed Ghani
- Incumbent
- Assumed office 28 February 2024
- Constituency: PK-37 Mansehra-II
- In office 13 August 2018 – 21 January 2023
- Constituency: PK-31 (Mansehra-II)

President of PTI, Hazara Division
- In office 18 July 2023 – 29 August 2024
- Chairman: Imran Khan; Gohar Ali Khan
- Preceded by: Saleh Muhammad Khan
- Succeeded by: Nazir Ahmed Abbasi

Personal details
- Born: 3 June 1962 (age 63) Mansehra, Pakistan
- Party: PTI (2018-present)
- Other political affiliations: PMLN (2008-2018); IND (2002-2008)
- Relations: Khudadad Khan; Azam Swati; Nawaz Khan Allai; Gushtasap Khan; Zubair Khan; Taj Muhammad; Munir Hussain; Zahid Chanzeb; Laiq Muhammad

Babar Saleem Swati (بابر سلیم سواتی) (born 3 June 1962) also known as Babar Saleem Khan Jahangiri is a Pakistani politician and landlord who is the Speaker of the Provincial Assembly of Khyber Pakhtunkhwa since 29 February 2024. He is member of the Provincial Assembly of Khyber Pakhtunkhwa from the constituency PK-37 Mansehra -II. Previously, he was a member of the Provincial Assembly from 2018 to 2022 and served as Advisor to the Chief Minister on Home and Tribal Affairs from October 2022 till January 2023. He belongs to the Jehangiri family within the Swati tribe of Mansehra.

== Background ==
Babar Saleem Swati was born into Jehangiri family of the Khyber Pakhtunkhwa's first biggest Jageerdar tribe, The Swatis. His forefather Sultan Jehangir Deshrai, a grandson of Sultan Awes Gabri was the ruler of Sultanate of Swat.

Babar Saleem Swati is the grandson of Jageerdar Jummah Khan Swati who was the fourth "Khan of Mansehra City" during British Rule and great-grandson of Jageerdar Zaman Khan Swati who was the third inherited "Khan of Mansehra" during the Sikh rule. His uncle Tariq Khan Swati had been member for provincial assembly for the 3 consecutives terms from 1990 to 2002. His grandfather's brother Ali Gohar Khan Swati was the fifth Khan of Mansehra, prominent leader of All India Muslim League, governor of Sirnagar, agriculture minister of Kashmir state and had the title of "Khan Bahadur" given by the viceroy of India.

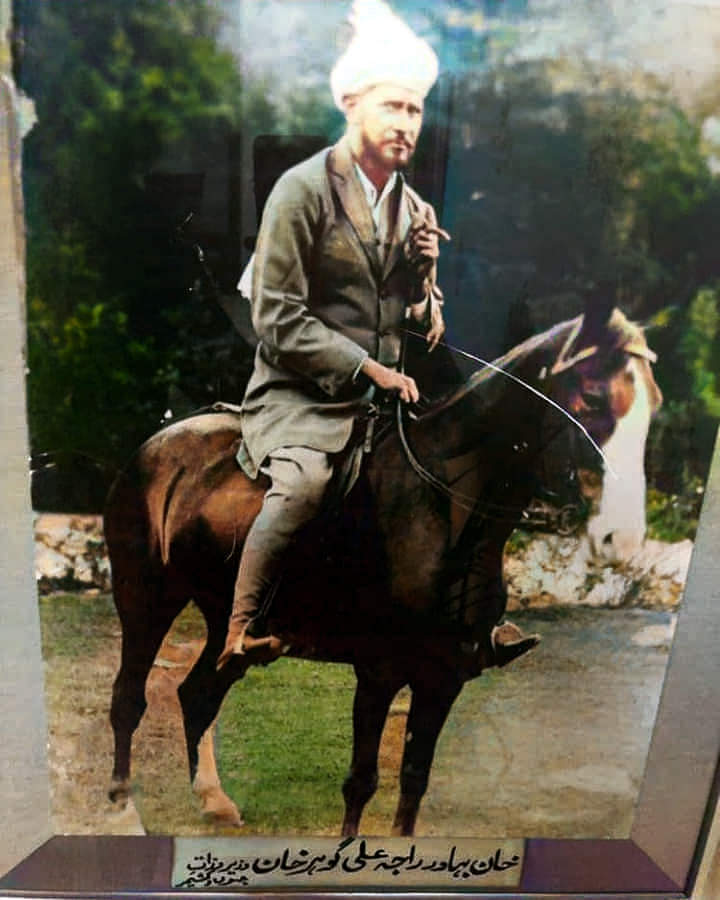
Khan Bahadur Ali Gohar Khan Swati, 5th Khan of Mansehra and elder brother of Babar Saleem Swati's grandfather. Assassinated in 1948

== Political career ==
2002 General Elections

He took part in politics for the first time in 2002, becoming the next successor of Jageerdar Zaman Khan family politics. He fought against his own family member Tariq Khan Swati who previously remained MPA for the 12 years. Muhammad Shujah Khan Swati stood first by grabbing 13014 votes followed by Tariq Khan Swati securing 10320 votes and Babar Saleem Swati, an independent candidate secured 5191 votes.

2008 General Elections

Babar Saleem Swati, a Pakistani politician, made his electoral debut again in 2008 when he contested as a member of the Pakistan Muslim League (Nawaz). In this election, he went head-to-head against 3 times elected former MPA Tariq Khan Swati, who held the title of "Khan(نواب) of Mansehra City" and also happened to be a first cousin of Babar Saleem Swati's grandfather. Babar Saleem Swati secured 12504 votes, Tariq Khan Swati secured 8013 votes while the winner Muhammad Shuja Khan Swati secured 25858 votes.

2013 General Elections

In 2013, Babar Saleem Swati chose to run independently, facing off against his own cousin, Khurram Khan Swati. Despite the familial competition, the 2013 election results showed Babar Saleem Swati securing 12,944 votes, while his cousin Khurram Khan Swati received 10,614 votes. However, the eventual victor of the election was Sardar Zahoor Ahmed, who garnered 21,991 votes. In this election, Habibullah Khan(Self-claimed Chief of Swati tribe) also participated and secured 7087 votes while his cousin Shuja Khan Swati secured 17229 votes.

2018 General Elections

He was elected to the Provincial Assembly of Khyber Pakhtunkhwa as a candidate of Pakistan Tehreek-e-Insaf from Constituency PK-31 (Mansehra-II) in the 2018 Pakistani general election. He also served as advisor to Chief Minister on Home and tribal affairs during this term.

2024 General Elections

He is re-elected to the Provincial Assembly of Khyber Pakhtunkhwa as a PTI-backed Independent candidate from Constituency PK-37 (Mansehra-II) in the 2024 Pakistani general election. He grabbed 35,213 votes while his opponent Sardar Zahoor Ahmad got 20,950 votes.
