= Icherrian =

- Village and union council
- Country: Pakistan
- Region: Khyber Pakhtunkhwa
- District: Mansehra District

Government
- Time zone: UTC+5 (PST)

Icherrian is a village and union council (an administrative subdivision) of Mansehra District in the Khyber Pakhtunkhwa province of Pakistan. It is located to the north east of Mansehra the district capital and lies in an area affected by the 2005 Kashmir earthquake.
