= Devli Jaberr =

Devli jabber
- Union council and town
- Country: Pakistan
- Region: Khyber Pakhtunkhwa
- District: Mansehra District
- Time zone: UTC+5 (PST)

Devli Jabber is a Union Council (an administrative subdivision) of Mansehra District in the Khyber Pakhtunkhwa province of Pakistan. It lies in the north east of the district and is in an area that was affected by the 2005 Kashmir earthquake.
