= Peeran =

Peeran پیراں Peeran Khairabad
- Village
- Location in Pakistan Peeran (Khyber Pakhtunkhwa)
- Coordinates: 34°19′48.8″N 73°18′14.1″E
- Country: Pakistan
- Region: Khyber Pakhtunkhwa
- District: Mansehra District
- Tehsil: Mansehra Tehsil
- Founder: Syed Sultan Muhammad Shah Jee Baba and his son Syed Shah Muhammad Sagheer Shah Jee Baba

Area
  - Total: 121.40569 km^{2} (46.87500 sq mi)
- Elevation: 2,400 m (8,000 ft)

Population (2017)
  - Total: 5,100
- Time zone: UTC+5 (PST)
- Pakistan Post Code: 21271
- Area code: 0997

Peeran is a village and union council (an administrative subdivision) of Mansehra District in the Khyber-Pakhtunkhwa province of Pakistan. It is located in District Mansehra. It is in an area affected by the 2005 Kashmir earthquake.

Peeran is the biggest union council of Mansehra both in population and area. Most of the residents in this area are Awans, Syeds, Gujjers. Most Notable families of this area are the Syeds and the Khans of Lunda[A village in Peeran U/C] who are basically qutabshahi and the descendants of The ruler of Herat[Afghanistan City] who came to this region after conquering this area along with Mahmud Ghaznavi.

== Toponymy ==
Syed Sultan Muhammad Shah Jee Baba got 128128 kanal land as his part, after defeating sultan Mahmud Khurd. Sultan Muhammad Shah Jee Baba's son Syed Muhammad Sagheer Shah Jee Baba inhabited the eastern part of that land(today's Peeran). Shortly after their settlement, people started to call new village as "Peer" (Urdu: پیر) or "Peeran"(Urdu: پیراں). However in mid 20th century, village was known as "Pair" and "Pairan". In recent times, after name restoration resolution from local Syeds and other inhabitants, local government restored name back to "Peeran".

== Historical background ==
The whole village Peeran along with BugherMungh, Khairabad and some other places in Mansehra and Balakot are parts of 128128 kanals owned by Shah Jee Baba after his victory of Swatis from Sultan Mahmood turk of gullibagh. The land of village Peeran was inhabited by his son Syed Muhammad Sagheer Shah Jee Baba, also Sufi saint whose shrine is in middle of village. All local syeds living in village are descendants of Syed Muhammad Sagheer Shah Jee baba also known as Shah Jee baba of Peeran.

== Demographics ==
Hindku is primary language in Peeran. Urdu is known to everyone, while some can understand and speak pashtu and English.

People living here are belonging to following castes

1. Syeds (descendants of village founder, Most Populated and respectable cast due to Shah Jee Baba)
2. Awans (Second largest cast in Peeran who migrated here with Shah jee Baba)
3. Gujjars
4. Mughals
5. Kashmiris

Aele Tashee (Shias), Aele Sunnat Wal Jamat (Sunni) and Bralvies ( Followers of Ahmed Raza Khan Bralvi) are all living together in village Peeran. Imam Hussain A.S Mosque is situated in Havelli Syedan, Peeran, where both Sunnis and shias offers their prayers accordingly.Currently Peeran village have more than 15 masajids (mosques) of all Sects.

Government Higher Secondary School Boys Peeran and Government Girls Higher Secondary School Peeran are highest degree awarding institutes. About 10 government primary and middle schools are currently functional. Some private schools are also operational in Peeran.

Basic Health Unit Madwanna, Peeran is highest medical facility available for Village Peeran.

== Economy ==
Although agriculture and farming are not primary source of income of villagers, but yet more than 80% people are directly & indirectly related to agriculture and farming in village Peeran. Major and popular businesses are;

1. Agriculture
2. Wheat cultivation
3. Corn cultivation
4. Vegetables cultivation
5. Flour chakki (mills)
6. Logging
7. Furniture manufacturing
8. Retail shops
9. Private schools business
10. Milk farming
11. Bull farming
12. Poultry farming
13. Transportation services
14. Cargo

Major primary professions includes;

1. Teaching
2. Shop keeping
3. Tailoring
4. Wood cutting and crafting
5. Farming
6. Shoe repairing
7. Catering
8. Hospitality
9. Plant Nurseries

== Governance ==
Governance in village Peeran is done by two systems,

- Numberdari(headmen) system (Non Funtional or Approchable to some Families).
- Village council

As of 2020, numberdari (headmen) system is not very functional but still some critical decisions related to community issues, land disputes, families fight, killing & local welfare committees are taken by numberdar(headman). Current numberdar of Peeran is Syed naveed hussain shah son of late numberdar Syed rafiq hussain shah. Numberdar was usually appointed by local leaders of different settlements in meeting usually for life time from numberdar clan. Currently, all members of village council are retired. In Khyber Pakhtunkhwa, the last local government polls were held in 2015 and the tenure of the elected persons expired on Aug 28, 2019 which also included members of village council Peeran.

== Location and geography ==
Peeran is located in the Mansehra District. Its location coordinates are 34°19′48.8″N 73°18′14.1″E.

Maira Amjad Ali and Balakot tehsil are in north of Peeran.

In west, Peeran borders Shah Khail Garhi (North West), Peengal and village Jangalan (South West).

In the south, Peeran touches the Barhn (area of Abbottabad District).

While Khairabad (North East), Trakot and Kusumbi lies in east.

This is an important location, as it is surrounded by important cities like Muzaffarabad (AJK's capital), Mansehra, Balakot (Popular summer destination), and Abbottabad (important Cantonment). For ease of Azad Jammu Kashmir's people, Islamabad is planning a highway through village Peeran joining Muzaffarabad city to Mansehra City at village Datta. This proposed highway will increase AJK connectivity with rest of Pakistan. As of 2020, no work has started yet, except for few by air surveys.

== Attractions / Amenities ==
Peeran is known for its historical places, cool weather, religious ceremonies, religious sites & snowfall. Some of prominent attraction for tourists are,

- Shah jee baba Shrine
- Popular summer spot of ichar Nala(paengal)
- Tower View
- Under construction water dam in Peeran
- forests
- Wildlife
- Cricket grounds & tournaments
- Animal marketplace
- Animal fights tournaments
- Centuries old cemeteries
- Sultan shah jee baba Shrine
- Hilly tracks
- Wide range of flora & fauna
- Hospitality
- Cultural tourism
- Regular snowfall in village.

In recent past years, tourism in Peeran which traditionally relied on religious tourists, has been boosted by construction of new dam, ichar nala as well as regular winter snowfall. Growth in tourism has been pivotal in rise of hospitality industry in village. Ichar nala(Paengal Spring) is now one of top summer & ramazan spot in Mansehra district.

== Sports ==
Tennis cricket & gully cricket are most popular sports of village Peeran. Some of main cricket events of village includes,

- Peeran premier league (PPL)
- Peeran super league (PSL)
- Khairabad Cup
- Leaque cricket tournament

Apart from cricket, other indoor and outdoor sports are also played in Peeran.

- Volleyball
- Basketball
- Badminton
- Association football
- Cricket
- Ludo

Local Games of Hazara division are also very popular in village Peeran. They include,

- Gulli Danda
- Patang baazi (flying kite)
- Kabaddi
- Chanto dooga
- Chupan chupai
- Dhoor dhoorai (Run running)
- Leek (bull running)
- Peearh (dogs fighting)
- Bantay baloorah (marble balls game)
- King stop
- Qaidi qaidi (hitting soft ball to other players to make them your prisoners, ultimately becoming king of them)
- Diya diya Kiya diya

Morel hunting, hunting are also popular among youth of the area.

== Notable Peoples ==
- Sardar Zahoor Ahmad
- Nadir Khan
- Senator Muhammad Raza Khan
- Chief Justice High Court Mehboob Ali Khan
- Deputy Commissioner Sarfraz Khan
