= Shoukatabad =

Pakistani village

Shoukatabad (شوکت آباد in Urdu)
- Town and union council
- Country: Pakistan
- Region: Khyber-Pakhtunkhwa
- District: Mansehra District
- Time zone: UTC+5 (PST)

Shoukatabad (alternative spelling Shaukat Abad) is a Union Council of Mansehra District in Khyber-Pakhtunkhwa province of Pakistan. It is located to the north-west of the district capital Mansehra.
