= Karori, Mansehra =

Karori
- Union council of Tehsil Oghi
- Country: Pakistan
- Region: Khyber Pakhtunkhwa
- District: Mansehra District
- Time zone: UTC+5 (PST)

Karori (کروڑی) is a Town and union council (an administrative subdivision) of Mansehra District in the Khyber Pakhtunkhwa Province of Pakistan. It is located in the west of the district and lies in a region devastated by the 2005 Kashmir earthquake.
