= Danna, Mansehra =

Danna دنہ
- village
- Interactive map of Danna
- Coordinates: 34°28′42.2364″N 72°57′12.2184″E
- Country: Pakistan
- Province: Khyber Pakhtunkhwa
- District: Mansehra
- Tehsil: Oghi

Population
  - Total: 500

Danna or Dana is a small village on a hilltop in Oghi Tehsil, in Mansehra District of Pakistan's Khyber Pakhtunkhwa province. This village is the center of the endangered Mankiyali language.
