= PK-38 Mansehra-III =

Pakistani electoral district

- Constituency for the Khyber Pakhtunkhwa Assembly
- Region: Mansehra Tehsil (partly) and Baffa Pakhal Tehsil (partly) of Mansehra District

Current constituency
- Party: Pakistan Muslim League (N)
- Member(s): Muhammad Naeem
- Created from: PK-57 Mansehra-V (2002-2018); PK-32 Mansehra-III (2018-2022)

PK-38 Mansehra-III (پی کے-38 مانسہرہ-3) is a constituency for the Khyber Pakhtunkhwa Assembly of the Khyber Pakhtunkhwa province of Pakistan.

== See also ==
- PK-37 Mansehra-II
- PK-39 Mansehra-IV
