= Dilborri =

Dilbori
- Union council and town
- Country: Pakistan
- Region: Khyber Pakhtunkhwa
- District: Mansehra District
- Time zone: UTC+5 (PST)
- Postal code: 21430

Dilbori is a village and union council (an administrative subdivision) of Mansehra District in Khyber Pakhtunkhwa province of Pakistan. It lies in a region devastated by the 2005 Kashmir earthquake. Swati is the most influential tribe of this area.
