= Nika Pani =

Nika Pani Bara Sheher
- Village and union council
- Country: Pakistan
- Province: Khyber-Pakhtunkhwa
- District: Mansehra District
- Time zone: UTC+5 (PST)

Nika Pani (نکہ پانی) is a village and union council of Mansehra District in Khyber Pakhtunkhwa province of Pakistan. Nika Pani is located in the east of the district.
