= Mansehra (Rural) =

- Town and union council
- Country: Pakistan
- Region: Khyber-Pakhtunkhwa
- District: Mansehra District
- Time zone: UTC+5 (PST)

Mansehra (Rural) Takiya Shungli is in Union Council Bandi Shungli (Tanawal) Tehsil Oghi, almost 19 KM away from Oghi.

Union Council (an administrative subdivision) of Mansehra District in Khyber-Pakhtunkhwa province of Pakistan. It is located in the south of the district and to the southeast of the district capital, Mansehra.
