= Munir Hussain (Pakistani politician) =

Pakistani politician And Senior Lawyer

Munir Hussain Lughmani

Member of the Provincial Assembly of Khyber Pakhtunkhwa
- Incumbent
- Assumed office 29 February 2024
- Constituency: PK-36 Mansehra-I

Personal details
- Born: Balakot, Khyber Pakhtunkhwa, Pakistan
- Political party: PTI (2024-present)

Munir Hussain Lughmani is a Pakistani lawyer and politician from Balakot Tehsil of Mansehra District. He is currently serving as member of the Provincial Assembly of Khyber Pakhtunkhwa since February 2024.

He is member of Judicial Commission of Pakistan from KP elected in March 2024. He belongs to Lughmani family of the Sarkheli subsection of Swati tribe.

== Career ==
He has remained President of District Bar Association Mansehra and was elected as member of Khyber Pakhtunkhwa Bar Council. In 2024 he was elected as member Judicial Commission of Pakistan from Khyber Pakhtunkhwa for two years.

In the 2024 general elections as a Pakistan Tehreek-e-Insaf/Independent candidate from PK-36 Mansehra-I. He secured 35074 votes while runner-up was Syed Junaid Ali Qasim of PML-N. Previously he also remained Tehsil Naib Nazim Balakot Nazim Union Council Garlat and Member District Council Mansehra.
