= PK-36 Mansehra-I =

Pakistani electoral district

- Constituency for the Khyber Pakhtunkhwa Assembly
- Region: Balakot Tehsil and Mansehra Tehsil (partly) of Mansehra District

Current constituency
- Party: Pakistan Tehreek-e-Insaf
- Member(s): Munir Lughmani Swati
- Created from: PK-54 Mansehra-II (2002-2018); PK-30 Mansehra-I (2018-2022)

PK-36 Mansehra-I (پی کے-36 مانسہرہ-1) is a constituency for the Khyber Pakhtunkhwa Assembly of the Khyber Pakhtunkhwa province of Pakistan.

== See also ==
- PK-32 Battagram-II
- PK-37 Mansehra-II
