= Kathai =

- Village and union council
- Interactive map of Kathai
- Country: Pakistan
- Region: Khyber Pakhtunkhwa
- District: Mansehra District
- Time zone: UTC+5 (PST)

Kathai is a village and union council (an administrative subdivision) of Mansehra District in Khyber Pakhtunkhwa province of Pakistan. It lies in a region affected by the 2005 Kashmir earthquake.
