= Shamdarra =

- Village and union council
- Country: Pakistan
- Region: Khyber Pakhtunkhwa
- District: Mansehra District
- Time zone: UTC+5 (PST)

Shamdarra or Shamdharra is a village and union council (an administrative subdivision) of the Mansehra District in the Khyber Pakhtunkhwa province of Pakistan. It is located in the north of the district and borders Batagram District.

== Economy ==
About 58% of the population of the Shamdharra area are engaged in bucolic occupations, such as agriculture/cultivation, animal husbandry, livestock management and forestry. The rest of the population work as expatriates in other locations in Pakistan, or abroad. Others are engaged in local small and medium-scale businesses.

== People and language ==
The main languages of the region are Hindko (77%), Pushto (18%) followed by Gojri (5%) and others. The main ethnic groups are: Pathans (Swati, Tanoli, Khan khel, Bala khail, Tor khail, Hassanzai, Akazai, aka Khel), Awan, Gujar, and Sayyids. It is most diverse town in the area, which accepts almost all the people from different customs and backgrounds.
