= Mansehra Jihad training camp =

The Mansehra Jihad training camp in Qandahar is asserted by Joint Task Force Guantanamo analysts to have been an Afghan training camp tied to terrorism.

Colonel Joseph Felter and his colleagues at the Combating Terrorism Center at the United States Military Academy at West Point published an analysis of 516 Summary of Evidence memos from the 2004 Combatant Status Review Tribunals. They wrote that 181 Guantanamo captives faced allegations that they trained at least one training camp. They published a bar chart listing the number of captives who attended the eleven most popular training camps. Felter and his colleagues wrote that there might have been as many as one hundred training camps run by al Qaeda, or an associated group. They published a second list of 27 camps that were lightly attended. That list included the Manshra Jihad training camp.

JTF-GTMO analysts alleged that Guantanamo captive Fazaldad admitted receiving rifle and general military training at the camp, though Fazaldad denied this in later testimony.
