= Naeem Sakhi Tanoli =

Pakistani politician

Member of the Provincial Assembly of Khyber Pakhtunkhwa
- In office 13 August 2018 – 18 January 2023
- Constituency: PK-32 (Mansehra-III)

Personal details
- Party: Pakistan Muslim League (N)

Muhammad Naeem Sakhi Tanoli is a Pakistani politician who had been a member of the Provincial Assembly of Khyber Pakhtunkhwa from August 2018 till January 2023.

== Political career ==
He was elected to the Provincial Assembly of Khyber Pakhtunkhwa as a candidate of Pakistan Muslim League (N) from Constituency PK-32 (Mansehra-III) in 2018 Pakistani general election.
