= Mansehra Tehsil =

Mansehra Tehsil تحصیل مانسہرہ مانسهره تحصیل
- Tehsil
- Upper Pakhli
- Country: Pakistan
- Province: Khyber Pakhtunkhwa
- District: Mansehra District
- Region: Upper Pakhli

Government
  - Chairman: Shaikh Muhammad Shafi (PML(N))

Area
  - Tehsil: 1,340 km^{2} (520 sq mi)

Population (2017)
  - Tehsil: 1,017,643
  - Urban: 144,855
  - Rural: 872,788
- Time zone: UTC+5 (PST)
- Number of towns: 1

Mansehra Tehsil is a tehsil in Mansehra District, Khyber Pakhtunkhwa, Pakistan.

Mansehra serves as the headquarter of both the tehsil and the district.

== History ==
During British Rule, Mansehra was a tehsil of Hazara District, with larger boundaries than today, as described by the Imperial Gazetteer of India.

== See also ==
- Mansehra
