= Mansehra District =

District in Khyber Pakhtunkhwa, Pakistan

Mansehra District ضلع مانسہرہ
- District of Khyber Pakhtunkhwa
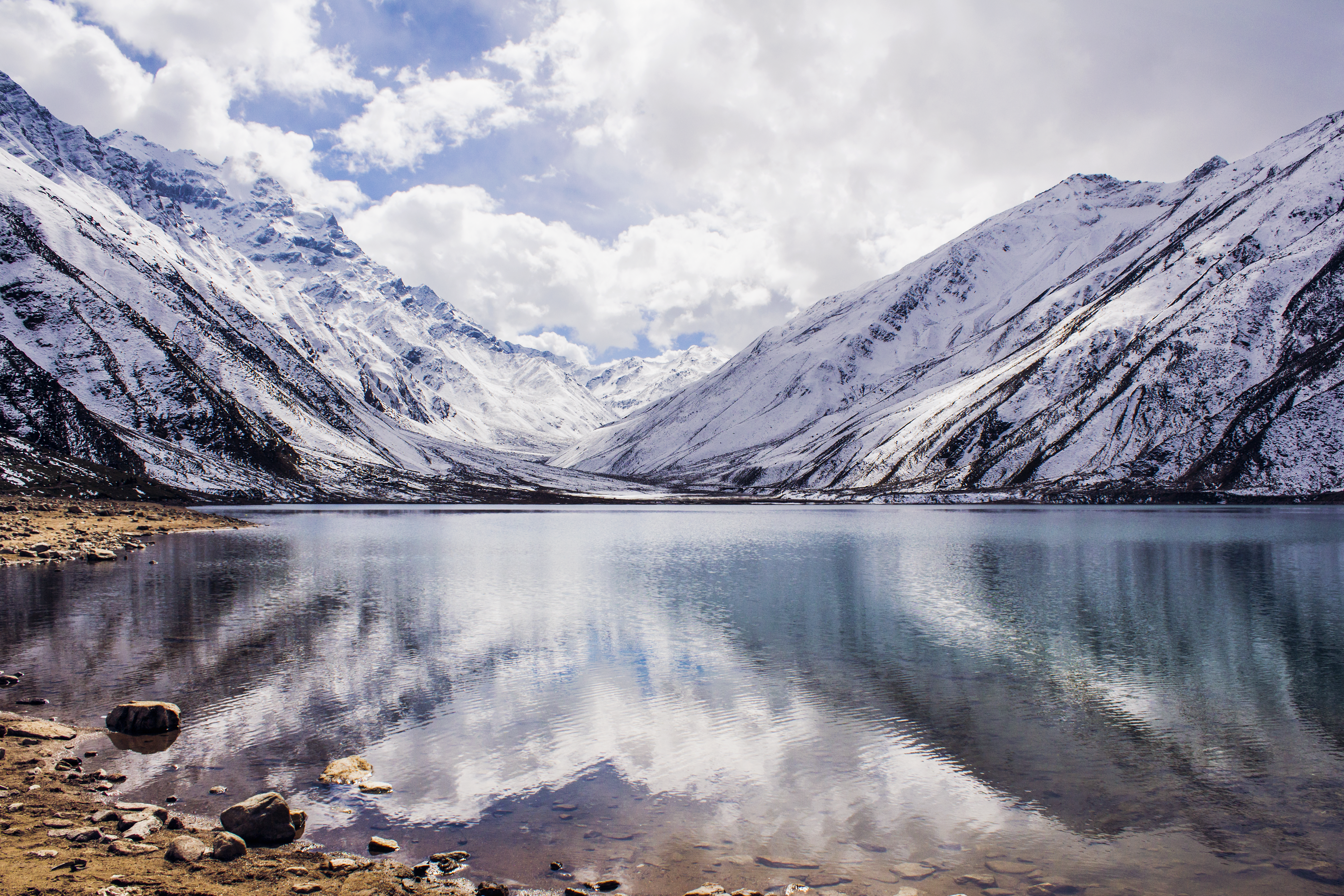
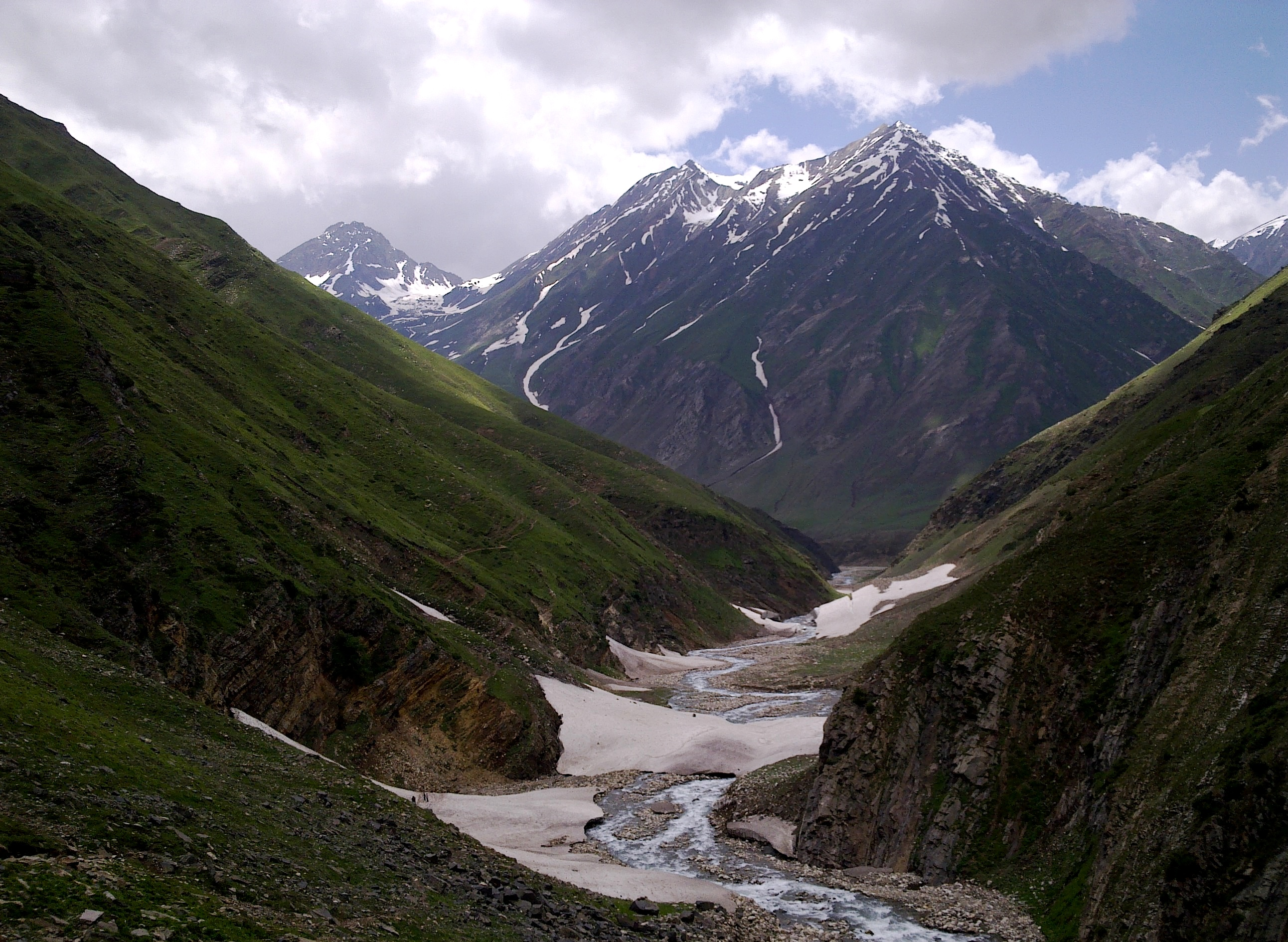
- Top: Malika Parbat and Lake Saiful Muluk; Bottom: View of Besal

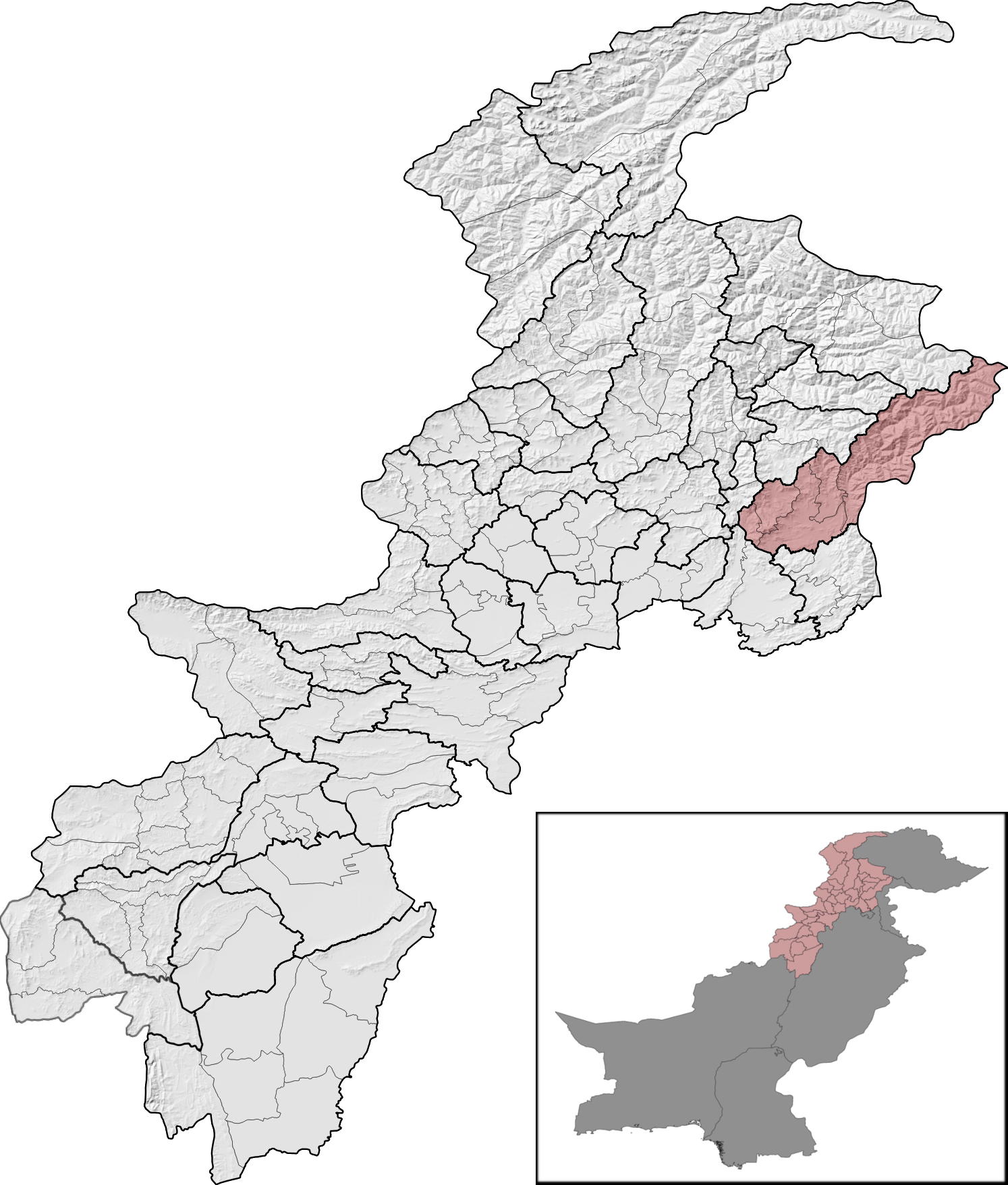
- Mansehra District (red) in Khyber Pakhtunkhwa
- Country: Pakistan
- Province: Khyber Pakhtunkhwa
- Division: Hazara
- Region: Pakhli
- Headquarters: Mansehra

Government
  - Type: District administration
  - Deputy Commissioner: Bilal Shahid Rao (BPS-18 PAS)
  - District Police Officer: Zahoor Babar Afridi (BPS-19 PSP)

Area
  - District of Khyber Pakhtunkhwa: 4,579 km^{2} (1,768 sq mi)

Population (2023)
  - District of Khyber Pakhtunkhwa: 1,797,177
  - Density: 392.5/km^{2} (1,017/sq mi)
  - Urban: 154,834 (8.62%)
  - Rural: 1,642,343

Literacy
  - Literacy rate: Total: (63.79%); Male: (75.33%); Female: (52.02%)
- Time zone: UTC+5 (PST)
- Area code: 0997
- Number of union councils: 59
- Number of tehsils: 5
- Website: mansehra.kp.gov.pk

Mansehra District (Urdu, Hindko: ضلع مانسہرہ) is a district in the Hazara Division, Khyber Pakhtunkhwa, northern Pakistan. The city of Mansehra serves as the headquarters of the district.

Mansehra was established as an independent district in 1976. It was previously a tehsil within the broader Hazara District. In 1993, a former subdivision of Mansehra, Battagram, was separated as an independent district. Similarly, in 2011, another subdivision of Mansehra, Kala Dhaka, was separated which is now known as Torghar District.

== Demographics ==
=== Population ===
Historical population
Year	Pop.	±% p.a.
1951	260,631	—
1961	373,975	+3.68%
1972	552,842	+3.62%
1981	686,308	+2.43%
1998	978,157	+2.11%
2017	1,555,742	+2.47%
2023	1,797,177	+2.43%

As of the 2023 census, Mansehra district has 294,052 households and a population of 1,797,177. The district has a sex ratio of 103.08 males to 100 females and a literacy rate of 63.79%: 75.33% for males and 52.02% for females. 478,985 (26.76% of the surveyed population) are under 10 years of age. 154,834 (8.62%) live in urban areas.

=== Ethnic groups ===
Gujar is the largest ethnic group of the Mansehra district, forming a simple majority. Other main ethnic groups of Mansehra include Kohistani, Tanoli, Awan, Syed, and Swati. A few other minor ethnic groups also inhabit Mansehra, including Dhund, Mughal, Qureshi, Akhun Khel, Turk, and Pashtun tribes (Mandokhel, Yousafzai, Utmanzai, Nusratkhel, Hassanzai).

=== Languages ===
Languages of Mansehra district (2023)
1. Hindko (66.2%)
2. Pashto (18.0%)
3. Kohistani (2.51%)
4. Urdu (1.16%)
5. Others (12.1%)

==== Main languages ====
Four main languages, Hindko, Pashto, Kohistani, and Urdu spoken in the district. At the time of the 2023 census, 66.22% of the population spoke Hindko, 17.97% Pashto, 2.51% Kohistani and 1.16% Urdu as their first language.

==== Other languages ====
Other minor languages are spoken by 12.14%. These languages include Gujari, Mankiyali and a few others. Many of these, especially in the upper Kaghan Valley, are speakers of the Kohistani dialects. There are also speakers of the widely dispersed Gujari language, particularly in the Kaghan Valley. The local variety is intermediate between the eastern dialects of Gujari (spoken in Azad Kashmir) and the western group (spoken in Chitral, Swat and Gilgit). There is also a small community in the village of Dana in Oghi Tehsil who speak the endangered Mankiyali language.

=== Religions ===
Religion in contemporary Mansehra District
Religious group	1941		2017		2023	
Religious group	Pop.	%	Pop.	%	Pop.	%
Islam	293,231	97.79%	1,555,315	99.97%	1,785,071	99.75%
Hinduism	5,431	1.81%	28	~0%	39	~0%
Sikhism	1,174	0.39%	—N/a	—N/a	31	~0%
Christianity	22	0.01%	163	0.01%	3,986	0.22%
Other	0	~0%	236	0.02%	497	0.03%
Total Population	299,858	100%	1,555,742	100%	1,789,624 (Note: Different from official population figure since it excludes sensitive areas where religion was not asked)	100%
Note: 1941 census data is for Mansehra, Amb and Phulra tehsils of erstwhile Hazara district, which roughly corresponds to contemporary Mansehra district. District and tehsil borders have changed since 1941.

== Constituencies ==
The district is represented in the Khyber Pakhtunkhwa Assembly by elected MPAs who represent the following constituencies:

Constituency and current member :

- PK-36 (Mansehra-I), Munir Lughmani Swati
- PK-37 (Manshera-II), Babar Saleem Swati
- PK 38 (Mansehra III), Zahid Chanzeb Swati
- PK 39 (Mansehra IV), Ikram Ghazi Tanoli
- PK 40 (Mansehra V), Sardar Shah Jahan

The district is represented in the National Assembly of Pakistan by two elected MNAs who represent the following constituencies:

- NA-14 (Mansehra-I)
- NA-15 (Mansehra Torghar), Shahzada Gustasip Khan Swati

== Administrative divisions ==
Administrative subdivisions of Mansehra District plus district Kala Dhaka (Torghar)

Mansehra District consists of six tehsils, with Tanawal Tehsil separated from the other five in December 2022. The area comprising present-day Mansehra District historically consisted of two regions: Pakhal, known as the country of the Swati tribe, and Tanawal, the territory of the Tanoli tribe.

Tehsil	Name (Urdu)	Area (km^{2})	Pop. (2023)	Density (ppl/km^{2}) (2023)	Literacy rate (2023)	Union Councils
Baffa Pakhal	(Urdu: تحصیل بفہ پکھل)	640	460,090	718.89	60.85%	
Bala Kot Tehsil	(Urdu: تحصیل بالاکوٹ)	2,376	310,339	130.61	67.50%	
Darband	(Urdu: تحصیل دربند)	102	51,702	506.88	50.47%	
Mansehra Tehsil	(Urdu: تحصیل مانسہرہ)	700	723,325	1,033.32	68.70%	
Oghi Tehsil	(Urdu: تحصیل اوگی)	307	251,721	819.94	52.85%	
Tanawal Tehsil	(Urdu: تحصیل تناول)	...	...	...	...	

The Kala Dhaka tehsil was separated as Torghar District in 2011.

== Politics ==
Member of Provincial Assembly	Party affiliation	Constituency	Year
Munir Lughmani Swati	Pakistan Tehreek-e-Insaf	PK-36 Mansehra-I	2024
Babar Saleem Khan Swati	Pakistan Tehreek-e-Insaf	PK-37 Mansehra-II	2024
Zahid Chanzeb Swati	Pakistan Tehreek-e-Insaf	PK-38 Mansehra-III	2024
Ikram Ghazi Khan Tanoli	Pakistan Tehreek-e-Insaf	PK-39 Mansehra-IV	2024
Sardar Shah Jahan Yousaf	Pakistan Muslim League (N)	PK-40 Mansehra-V	2024

== See also ==
- Mansehra Shiva Temple
- Mansehra Airport

== Bibliography ==
- 1998 District census report of Batagram. Census publication. Vol. 18. Islamabad: Population Census Organization, Statistics Division, Government of Pakistan. 1999.
- 1981 District census report of Mansehra. Vol. 23. Islamabad: Population Census Organization, Statistics Division, Government of Pakistan. 1983.
- 1998 District census report of Mansehra. Census publication. Vol. 62. Islamabad: Population Census Organization, Statistics Division, Government of Pakistan. 2000.
- Anjum, Uzma; Rehman, Khawaja (2015). "A First Look at Mankiyali Language: An Endangered Language". Journal of Asian Civilizations. 38 (1): 177–90. ProQuest 1816873650.
- Hallberg, Calinda E.; O'Leary, Clare F. (1992). "Dialect Variation and Multilingualism among Gujars of Pakistan". In O'Leary, Clare F.; Rensch, Calvin R.; Hallberg, Calinda E. (eds.). Hindko and Gujari. Sociolinguistic Survey of Northern Pakistan. Islamabad: National Institute of Pakistan Studies, Quaid-i-Azam University and Summer Institute of Linguistics. pp. 91–196. ISBN 969-8023-13-5.
