= NA-33 Nowshera-I =

Constituency of the National Assembly of Pakistan

- Constituency for the National Assembly of Pakistan
- Region: Jehangira Tehsil, Nowshera City and Cantonment area and Risalpur Cantonment of Nowshera District
- Electorate: 444,342

Current constituency
- Party: Pakistan Tehreek-e-Insaf
- Member: Syed Shah Ahad Ali Shah
- Created from: NA-6 Nowshera-II

NA-33 Nowshera-I (این اے-33، نوشہرہ-١) is a constituency for the National Assembly of Pakistan. The constituency was formerly known as NA-6 Nowshera-II from 1977 to 2018. The name changed to NA-25 (Nowshera-I) after the delimitation in 2018 and to NA-33 (Nowshera-I) after the delimitation in 2022.

== Members of Parliament ==
=== 1977–1985: NA-3 Peshawar-III ===
Election	Member	Party
1977	Aftab Ahmad Khan Sherpao	PPP

=== 1985–1990: NA-4 Peshawar-IV ===
Election	Member	Party
1985	Molana Abdul Haq	IND
1988	Mian Muzaffar Shah	PPP

=== 1990–2002: NA-4 Nowshera ===
Election	Member	Party
1990	Muhammad Ajmal Khan Khattak	ANP
1993	Major General (R) Naseer Ullah Khan Babar	PPP
1997	Wali Muhammad Khan	ANP

=== 2002–2018: NA-6 Nowshera-II ===
Election	Member	Party
2002	Maulana Hamid-ul-Haq Haqani	MMA
2008	Masood Abbas Khattak	ANP
2013	Siraj Muhammad Khan	PTI

=== 2018–2023: NA-25 Nowshera-I ===
Election	Member	Party
2018	Pervez Khattak	PTI

=== 2024–present: NA-33 Nowshera-I ===
Election	Member	Party
2024	Syed Shah Ahad Ali Shah	PTI

== Elections since 2002 ==
=== 2002 general election ===
2002 General Election: NA-6 (Nowshera-II)
Party	Candidate	Votes	%	±%
MMA	Hamid Ul Haq Haqqani	33,242	50.37	
PPPP	Naseerullah Babar	16,655	25.24	
ANP	Haji Sher Zada Khan	9,355	14.18	
PPP (S)	Mian Muzaffar Shah	5,810	8.80	
National Alliance	Afsar Shah	931	1.41	
Majority		16,587	25.13	
Turnout		65,993	35.12	
MMA gain from ANP				

A total of 2,467 votes were rejected.

=== 2008 general election ===
2008 General Election: NA-6 (Nowshera-II)
Party	Candidate	Votes	%	±%
ANP	Masood Abbas Khattak	36,835	43.26	+29.08
PPP (S)	Mian Jamshed-ud-Din	27,951	32.83	+24.03
PPPP	Mian Muzaffar Shah	20,358	23.91	−1.33
Majority		8,884	10.43	
Turnout		85,144	37.19	+2.07
ANP gain from MMA				

A total of 3,522 votes were rejected.

=== 2013 general election ===
2013 General Election: NA-6 (Nowshera-II)
Party	Candidate	Votes	%	±%
PTI	Siraj Muhammad Khan	54,266	39.81	
PML-N	Syed Zulfiqar Ali Shah	34,537	25.33	
ANP	Masood Abbas	20,316	14.90	−14.18
MDM	Hamid Ul Haq Haqqani	11,110	8.15	
PPPP	Maj Retd Liaqat Ali Shah Gailani	5,121	3.76	−20.15
Independent	Amin Akber	3,983	2.92	
Independent	Mian Shahenshah	3,207	2.35	
Independent	Saeed Ullah	1,453	1.07	
Independent	Khan Adil Ghaffar Khan Khattak	921	0.68	
TTP	Javed Iqbal	525	0.39	
Independent	Irshad Ali	408	0.30	
PPP (SB)	Kamal Shah	263	0.19	
Independent	Iqbal Hussain	203	0.15	
Majority		19,729	14.48	
Turnout		136,313	47.08	+9.89
PTI gain from ANP				

A total of 5,025 votes were rejected.

=== 2018 general election ===
General elections were held on 25 July 2018.

General election 2018: NA-25 (Nowshera-I)
Party	Candidate	Votes	%	±%
PTI	Pervez Khattak	82,118	45.86	▲6.05
PPP	Khan Pervaiz	35,658	19.92	▲16.16
MMA	Syed Zulfiqar Ali Shah	28,172	15.74	▲7.59
ANP	Malak Juma Khan	26,506	14.80	▼0.10
Others	Others (five candidates)	6,585	3.68	
Turnout		184,897	48.79	▲1.71
Total valid votes		179,039	96.84	
Rejected ballots		5,858	3.17	
Majority		46,460	25.94	▲11.46
Registered electors		378,941		
PTI hold		Swing	N/A	

=== 2024 general election ===
General elections were held on 8 February 2024. Syed Shah Ahad Ali Shah won with 93,474 votes.

General election 2024: NA-33 Nowshera-I
Party	Candidate	Votes	%	±%
PTI	Syed Shah Ahad Ali Shah (Note: Filed nomination papers as PTI candidate but ECP allowed him to run as an Independent)	93,474	47.43	▲1.57
PTI-P	Pervez Khattak	26,592	13.49	N/A
ANP	Khan Pervaiz	24,725	12.54	▼2.26
PML(N)	Ikhtiar Wali Khan	21,373	10.84	▲8.55
JUI (F)	Ijaz Ul Haq	19,992	10.14	N/A
Others	Others (seven candidates)	10,939	5.55	
Turnout		202,814	45.64	▼3.15
Total valid votes		197,095	97.18	
Rejected ballots		5,719	2.82	
Majority		66,882	33.93	▲7.99
Registered electors		444,342		

== See also ==
- NA-32 Peshawar-V
- NA-34 Nowshera-II
