= Azakhel Payan =

- Village
- Location in Pakistan
- Coordinates: 33°59′0″N 71°53′0″E
- Country: Pakistan
- Region: Khyber Pakhtunkhwa
- District: Nowshera District
- Demonym: Zakhelwal
- Time zone: UTC+5 (PST)
- Postal Code: 24182

Azakhel Payan (Pashto: اضاخيل پايان) is a village of Nowshera Tehsil in northeastern Pakistan. Its original name (with diacritics) is Äza Khel Payan. The village houses an Afghan refugee camp.

Azakhel Payan lies along the Grand Trunk Road about 13 kilometres (8.1 mi) west of Nowshera, the capital city of Nowshera District. The majority of the village population works in agriculture. Villagers mainly farm potatoes, sugar cane, wheat, corn, tomatoes, and cucumbers.

== Etymology ==
The word Azakhel Payan is a linguistic compound consisting of three words. Aza is probably the name of its founder. The word khel might be derived from the Avestan word khuail, meaning "uncountable" or "over-populated". Khel is a cognate of the Persian word kheleh, meaning "lots" or "too much".

By convention, the word khel is placed after the name of a common ancestor or leader when naming a village. Khel is usually part of a single village's name, but it may also be used for a larger settlement. The last part of the village's name, Payan, means "lower" in Persian or Urdu.

According to one theory, the name Aza Khel was given to the village by its founder. The founder may have been Raza Khan. Raza Khan, also spelled Aza Khan, is considered a legendary Afghan warrior. Raza Khan had seven brothers, one of whom was Zarif Khan. One mohalla (subdivision) of the village, Zarifkhel, may take its name from Zarif Khan.

Azakhel Payan might not take its name from a founder or legendary hero. Instead, the name Aza Khel may derive from Za Khel, a town in Kondoz, Afghanistan.

== Geography ==
Azakhel Payan is bordered by the Cherat Mountains to the south and the Kabil River to the north. The distance between Kabul River and the Grand Trunk Road is about 2–3 km (1.2–1.9 mi). The village of Azakhel Bala lies just west of Azakhel Payan, and the town of Pir Piai is just east.

The area between the Kabil River and the Grand Trunk Road is called "Bela." It served as a training camp for Afghan mujaheddin during the Soviet-Afghan war. This area was established as a refugee camp for the Afghan immigrants in during the reign of Muhammad Zia-ul-Haq.

The parent material in and surrounding Azakhel Payan is siltstone.

== Azakhel Park ==
The Nowshera District government has leased 83 acres of agricultural land in Azakhel Payan to the University of Peshawar's Centre of Plant Biodiversity (CPB). This area is called Azakhel Park. The University of Peshawar plans to develop research laboratories, botanical nurseries, greenhouses, an herbarium, a museum, a conference hall, lecture theaters, a library, and areas for teaching students in Azakhel Park.

== Azakhel Dry Port ==
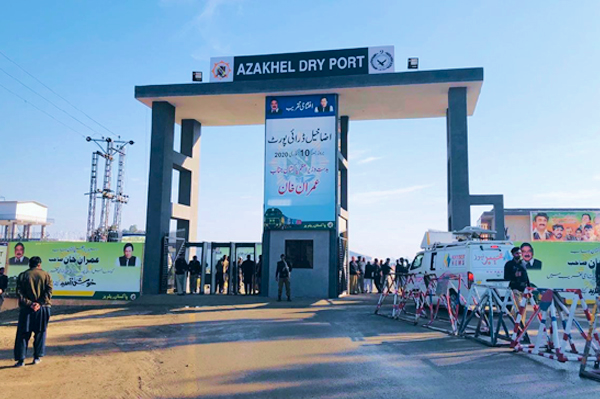
Azakhel Dry Port inaugurated by Prime Minister Imran Khan on January 10, 2020

Azakhel Dry Port was planned in 2006 and finalized by the Prime Minister Imran Khan which was completed with an estimated cost of Rs 507 million. It is spread over 28 acres of land at about 20 kilometres distance from Peshawar on main GT Road in Nowshera district's town Azakhel. The goods and shipments transported from Karachi port can be loaded here before its onward transportation to Peshawar and other districts of KP and Afghanistan through enhanced roads and rails services.

== Sher Shah Suri's Baoli ==
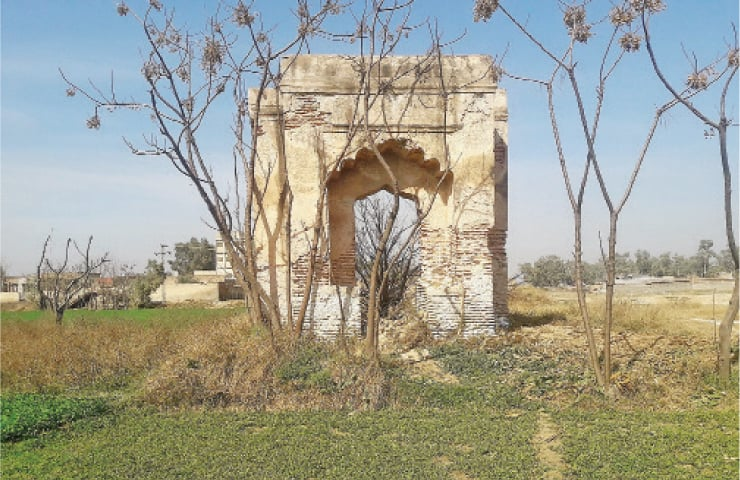
Sher Shah Suri's Baoli in Azakhel Payan

A baoli is a reservoir in which water can be stored. It is also a source of ground water. Azakhel Payan is home to a historic Baoli (stepwell) attributed to the famed Pashtun ruler Sher Shah Suri. This Baoli, located a short distance from the old Grand Trunk Road, is considered a relic of Sher Shah Suri's reign (1540–1545) and reflects his vision for urban and civic development. Local legend states that Sher Shah Suri himself used the Baoli during his travels, descending its steps on horseback to fetch water. This Baoli is the only surviving structure of its kind in Khyber Pakhtunkhwa, revered by the locals who refer to it as "Baoli Sharif."
