= Azakhel Park =

Park in Pakistan

- Interactive map of Azakhel Park
- Location: Azakhel Payan, Nowshera, Pakistan
- Coordinates: 34°00′27″N 71°52′33″E
- Area: 335,900 m^{2} (3,620,000 sq ft)

Azakhel Park (Urdu/Pashto: اضاخیل پارک) is a public park situated on the bank of GT Road, Azakhel Payan (Nowshera), Pakistan. Azakhel Park is spread over an area of 83 acres of land which consist of a botanical garden, nurseries, greenhouses, an herbarium, a museum, a conference hall, lecture theaters, a library, and academic blocks for teaching students of the University of Peshawar.

== Botanical Garden Azakhel ==
Botanical Garden Azakhel is project jointly launched by the University of Peshawar, the Higher Education Commission, and the Govt of Khyber Pakhtunkhwa with the mission of focusing the targets of Conservation and sustainable utilization of biodiversity of Pakistan. The University of Peshawar initiated this project in April, 2004, the HEC provided Rs. 37.861 million for development of the Botanical Garden in October, 2004, while the KP Government managed the transfer of developed land of Azakhel Park spreading over an area of 83 acres on 16 December 2005, to the University of Peshawar. Botanical Garden Azakhel is a registered member of BGCI (Botanic Garden Conservation International-UK) for the implementation of CBD (Convention of Biological Diversity held at Rio de Janeiro in 1992).
