= Kheshgi Payan =

Pakistani village

Kheshgi Payan خیشکی پايان
- Village
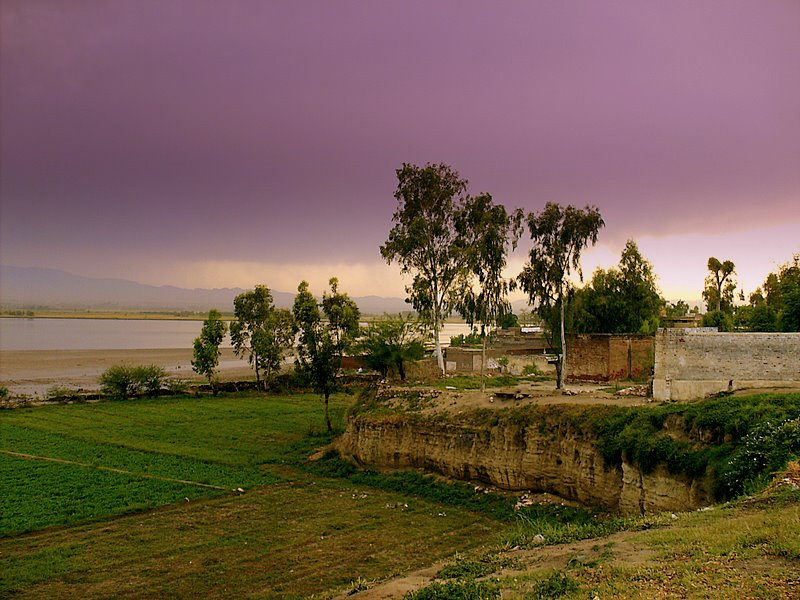
- A view of the large village of Kheshgi Payan

- Location in Pakistan
- Country: Pakistan
- Region: Khyber Pakhtunkhwa
- District: Nowshera District
- Time zone: UTC+5 (PST)

Kheshgi Payan (Pashto: خیشکی پايان) is a village in Nowshera District, Khyber Pakhtunkhwa, Pakistan.

== History ==
The Kheshgi village in Nowshera District is divided into two regions called Kheshgi Bala and Kheshgi Payan, on the basis of its altitude from the sea level i.e. Bala (above) and Payan (below).

The village dates from 1525 when a branch of the Kheshgi family settled in Khyber Pakhtunkhwa and started living on the bank of Kabul River in two villages.The present Kheshgi village is divided into two parts, Kheshgi Bala and Kheshgi Payan. According to the distribution and partition of 1877 both the villages are divided in accordance with the lands into eight Khels.

Kheshgi village is adjacent to the Pakistan Air Force Academy. Nowshera Cantonment is near the village as well just a few kilometers across the Kabul River.

The village also hosts camps for Afghan refugees affected by the War in Afghanistan (2001–2021).

== Gallery ==
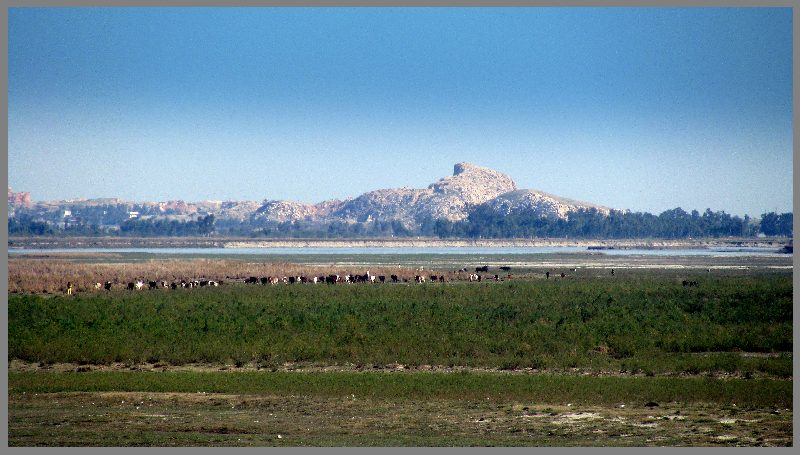
A view of the village of Kheshgi Payan which includes the River Kabul, some cattle, and green fields

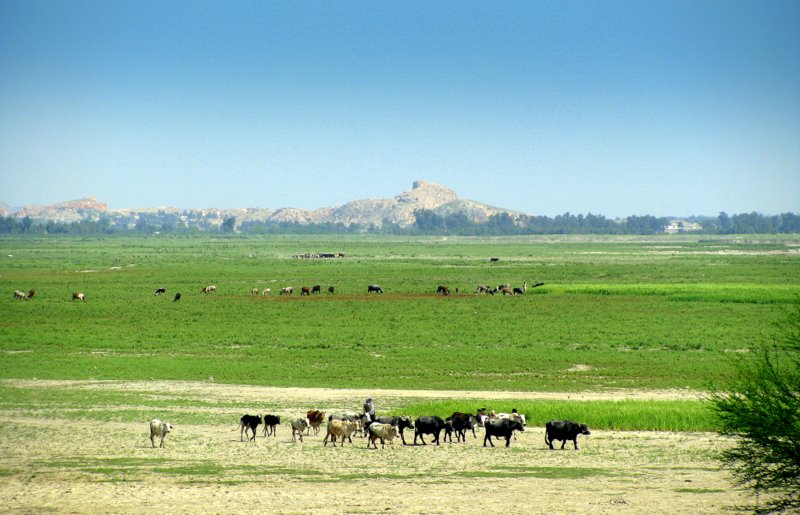
Kheshgi Meadows. Rustic Landscape.
