= List of special economic zones in Pakistan =

Special Economic Zones (SEZs) in Pakistan are areas designated by the government of Pakistan to promote industrial growth and attract investment. In Pakistan, the SEZ Act was established on 13 September 2012, alongside the subsequent notification of SEZ Rules within the same year.

== SEZs in Pakistan ==
The SEZs in Pakistan include:

- Industrial parks in Karachi
- Karachi Export Processing Zone
- Islamabad Model Special Economic Zone
- Gwadar Special Economic Zone
- Shaheed Benazir Bhutto Special Industrial Zone
- Risalpur Export Processing Zone
- Sialkot Export Processing Zone
- Gujranwala Export Processing Zone
- Khairpur Special Economic Zone
- Rashakai Special Economic Zone (Rashakai-Mardan, M-1 motorway)
- Bannu Economic Zone
- Gadoon Economic Zone (Gadoon-Amazai, Swabi District)
- Hathar Economic Zone (Hathar-Haripur District)
- Dhabeji Special Economic Zone
- Allama Iqbal Industrial City
- Bostan Special Economic Zone
- ICT Model Industrial Zone
- Pakistan Steel Mill Industrial Park
- Mirpur Industrial Zone
- Mohmand Marble City
- Moqpondass Special Economic Zone
- Quaid-e-Azam Business Park Sheikhupura

== See also ==
- China–Pakistan Economic Corridor
- Shaheed Benazir Bhutto Special Industrial Zone, Benazirabad
