= Government Home Economics College Nowshera =

Pakistani school

- Address: Pirpiai, Nowshera Pakistan
- Type: Public Sector
- Established: June 2015
- Location: Nowshera, Pakistan
- Website: Official Website

Government Home Economics College Nowshera is public sector girls college located at Pirpiai in Nowshera, Khyber Pakhtunkhwa, Pakistan.

== Overview & history ==
Government Home Economics College Nowshera is established in June 2015 by Government of KPK in order to develop Home Economics Education for female students.

== Faculties ==
The college currently has the following faculties.

- Computer Studies
- Economics
- English
- Islamyiat
- Pakistan Studies
- Psychology
- Science Department
- Statistics
- Urdu
- Art & Design
- Food & Nutrition
- Human Development and Family Studies
- Resource and Facility Management
- Textiles & Clothing

== See also ==
- Government Post Graduate College Nowshera
