= Akhund Panju Baba Mosque =

Mosque in Akbarpura, Nowshera, Pakistan

- اخوند پنجو بابا مسجد

Religion
- Affiliation: Islam

Location
- Location: Akbarpura
- Country: Pakistan
- Interactive map of Akhund Panju Baba Mosque
- Coordinates: 34°02′18″N 71°43′22″E

Architecture
- Type: mosque
- Established: c. 1618

Akhund Panju Baba Mosque is a mosque in Akbarpura, Nowshera, Pakistan. It is named after famous saint Hazrat Syed Abdul Wahab (Akhund Panju Baba), Hussaini Syed.

Famous sufis and saints including Bahadur Baba, father of Kaka Sahib, Akhund Salak Baba, Pir Sabak, Ali Khan Baba of charsadda were his disciples.

== History ==
The mosque was constructed around 405 years ago during Mughal Emperor Akbar's reign.

== Building ==
Submerging approximately four feet since its inception, the hall descends by a wheat grain-sized centimeter annually. Despite this, the mosque remains intact and functional for daily prayers. Local lore ties the mosque's fate to Doomsday and attributes its establishment to a miracle spring conjured by the eponymous Sufi saint upon Akbar's visit.
