= Rahat Zakheli =

- راحت زاخيلي
- Born: 19 February 1883; Azakhel Bala, Nowshera Pakistan
- Died: 29 May 1963 (aged 80)
- Occupations: novelist; poet; writer
- Writing career
- Pen name: Rahatullah Rahat
- Language: Pashto, Urdu, Arabic, Persian
- Notable work: Mah Rukh (1912) – The first Pashto novel; Kunda Jinai (1917) – The first Pashto short story
- Notable awards: Afghani Iqbal

Sayyid Rahatullah Rahat Zakheli (Pashto: راحت زاخيلي; 19 February 1883–29 May 1963) was a Pashto poet, writer and novelist.

== Early education ==
In 1884, Syed Farihullah, Zakheli's father, bestowed the name Syed Rahatullah upon him. Zakheli's father educated him, including in Arabic grammar and syntax which was common at the time. He began writing poetry to cope with the death of his younger brother Syed Shafqatullah. Zakheli was introduced to Christianity at a young age by a British evangelist, but rejected it for Islam.

== Literary Career ==
In 1911, he began publishing the first Pashto weekly newspaper, Afghan, and released Mah Rukh, one of if not the first Pashto novel, the following year. In 1917, he released his first fairy tale, Kunda Jinai (A Widow Girl), in Afghan and it became very popular.

Zakheli could write in both Persian and Pashto, and translated Muhammad Iqbal's poems Shikwa and Jawab-e-Shikwa into Pashto. This earned him great respect among the intellectual circles of his time, who gave him the epithet, the Afghani Iqbal. In 1923, he undertook another important translation endeavour, translating Saadi Shirazi's "Gulistan" into Pashto.

Rahat's commitment to Pashto language and literature was also reflected in his journalistic pursuits. In 1930, he inaugurated the Pashto newspaper Staray Ma She (meaning "welcome" in Pashto ) but it faced censorship and was quickly banned by the colonial authorities in the British Raj. Zakheli later continued his editorial journey, assuming the role of editor for the Pashto section of the newspaper Shahbaz in 1948, where he continued to champion Pashto language and culture.

== Death ==
Zakheli died on 29 May 1963. His final resting place is Azakhel Bala, the village where he was born. In commemoration of his legacy, a poignant line from his poetry captures the essence of his enduring influence.

که په قبر کې مي زړه هم ټوپ وهلی لېونتوبه زه به هله ستا قایل وې
If my heart was beating in the grave, madness, I would have believed you.
