= Jehangira Tehsil =

Jehangira Tehsil تحصیل جہانگیرا جهانګیره تحصیل
- Tehsil
- Country: Pakistan
- Province: Khyber Pakhtunkhwa
- District: Nowshera

Government
  - Chairman: Kamran Raziq Khan (PTI)

Population (2017)
  - Tehsil: 353,490
  - Urban: 85,722
  - Rural: 267,768
- Time zone: UTC+5 (PST)

Jehangira Tehsil is a tehsil located in Nowshera District, Khyber-Pakhtunkhwa, Pakistan. The tehsil is named after the Jehangira town, which is located on the GT Road. A village, Hasan Darra, also exists in Tehsil Jehangira.

== Overview ==
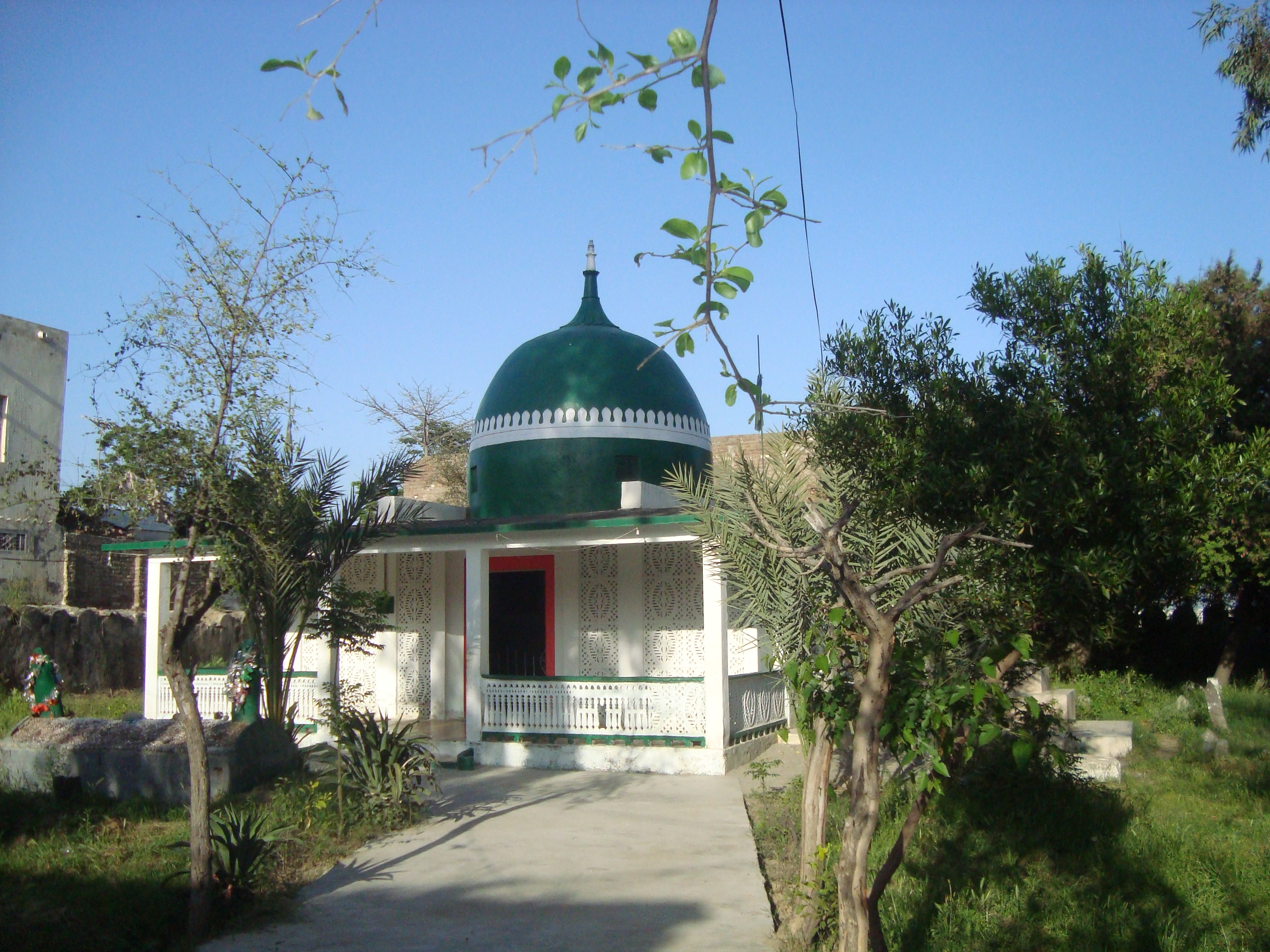
Sheikh Akhund Adyan seljoki

Jehangira tehsil covers the jurisdiction from Akora Khattak to Khairabad. The headquarter and capital of Jehangira tehsil is Jehangira town. The famous landmarks in Jehangira tehsil are Darul Uloom Haqqania at Akora Khattak, tomb of Khushal Khan Khattak, a library and a small museum in the name of Khushal Khan Khattak and shrine of Akhund Adyan Baba Seljoki. There is also a police station checkpoint which dates back to the British rule over the area.

The population of Jehangira tehsil, according to the 2017 census, is 353,490 while according to the 1998 census, the population of the area covering Jehangira tehsil, was 208,704.

== Towns and Villages ==
The main towns of Jehangira Tehsil are Jehangira, Akora Khattak, Khairabad, Nizampur. The main villages in Jehangira tehsil are below.

- Inzari
- Khawrai
- Adamzai
- Misri Banda
- Nandrak
- Mian Essa
- Wattar
- Surya Khel
- Mali Khel Bala
- Masam Khel
- Narri Naodeh
- Nihal Pura
- Uftada Hangal
- Banda Hangal
- Mushak
- Namal Sara Toi
- Chishmai
- Hardomizri Tang
- Kund
- Katti Miana
- Shaidu
- Lashora Totki
- Garu
- Jabbi
- Khar Mela
- Aman Pura
- Khan kohi
- Kahi
- Mami Khel
- Shagai
- Kawa
- Gharibpura

== Education ==
Jahangira tehsil is home to many educational institutes. The prominent ones are Govt Khushal Khan Khattak Degree College Akora Khattak and Govt Maulana Abdul Haq Degree College Khan Kohi, Nizampur.

== See also ==
- Nowshera Tehsil
- Pabbi Tehsil
- Nowshera District
