= Masood Abbas =

Pakistani politician

Member of the National Assembly of Pakistan
- In office 2008–2013
- Constituency: NA-6 (Nowshera-II)

Masood Abbas Khattak is a Pakistani politician who was a member of the National Assembly of Pakistan from 2008 to 2013.

== Political career ==
He was elected to the National Assembly of Pakistan from Constituency NA-6 (Nowshera-II) as a candidate of Awami National Party (ANP) in the 2008 Pakistani general election. He received 36,835 votes and defeated Jamshaid ud Din. In November 2008, he was inducted into the federal cabinet of Prime Minister Yousaf Raza Gillani and was made Minister of State for Local Government and Rural Development where he served until December 2012. From December 2011 to February 2012, he remained in the federal cabinet as Minister of State without any portfolio.

He ran for the seat of the National Assembly as a candidate of ANP from Constituency NA-6 (Nowshera-II) in the 2013 Pakistani general election but was unsuccessful. He received 20,316 votes and lost the seat to Siraj Muhammad Khan.
