= Khairabad, Pakistan =

Khairabad
- Town
- Interactive map of Khairabad
- Country: Pakistan
- Province: Khyber-Pakhtunkhwa
- District: Nowshera District
- Time zone: UTC+5 (PST)

Khairabad (Pashto: خیرآباد pronounce, Urdu: خیرآباد pronounce) is a town in Jehangira tehsil of Nowshera District in Khyber Pakhtunkhwa province of Pakistan. Attock is located to the east, Nizampur to the south and Jehangira town to the north.

== Overview ==
Khairabad is located at the eastern edge of Khyber Pakhtunkhwa and connects Khyber Pakhtunkhwa and Punjab through Khairabad bridge. Khairabad is entry point from Punjab to Khyber Pakhtunkhwa.

== See also ==
- Jehangira Tehsil
- Nowshera District
