= Nowshera District =

Coordinates: 33°56′N 71°59′E

Nowshera District ضلع نوشہرہ نوښار ولسوالۍ
- District of Khyber Pakhtunkhwa
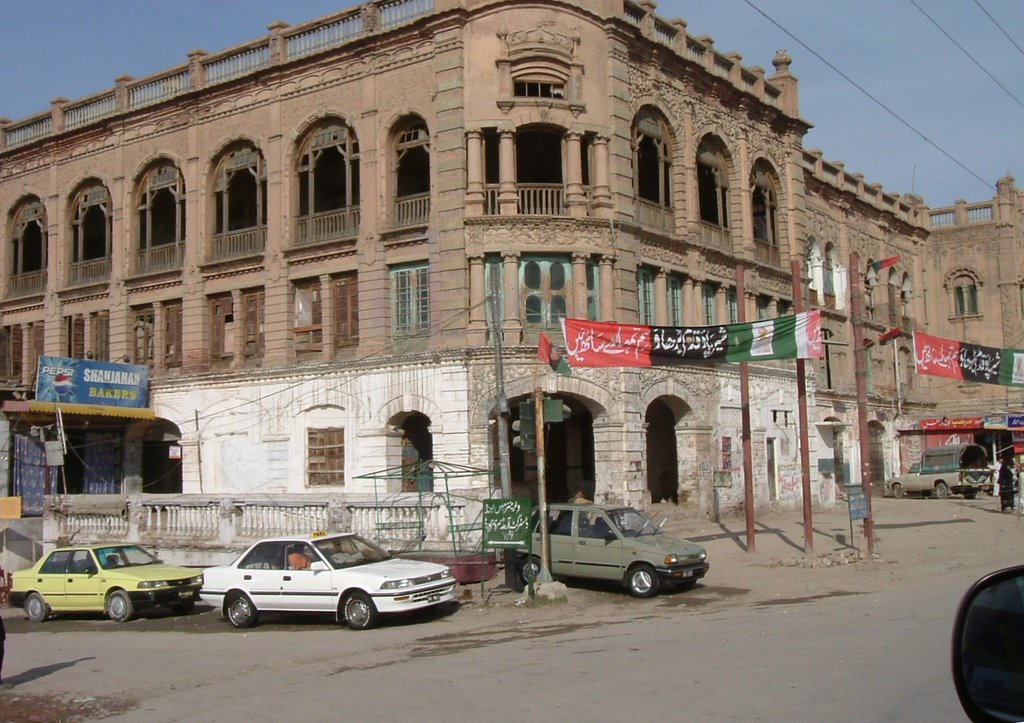
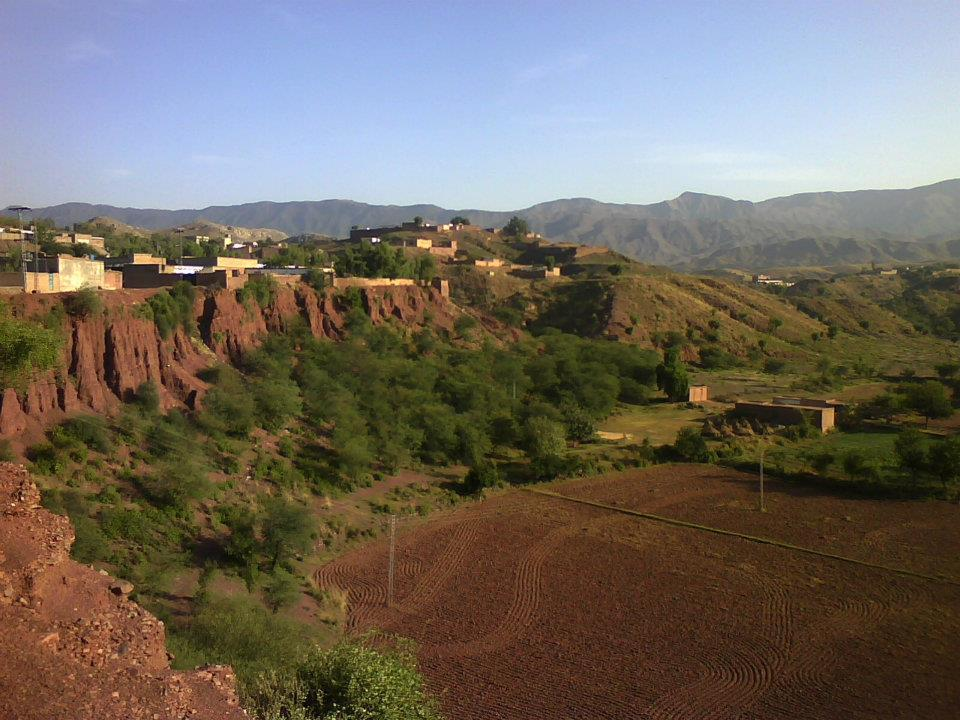
- Top: British era building in Nowshera; Bottom: View of Dak Ismail Khel

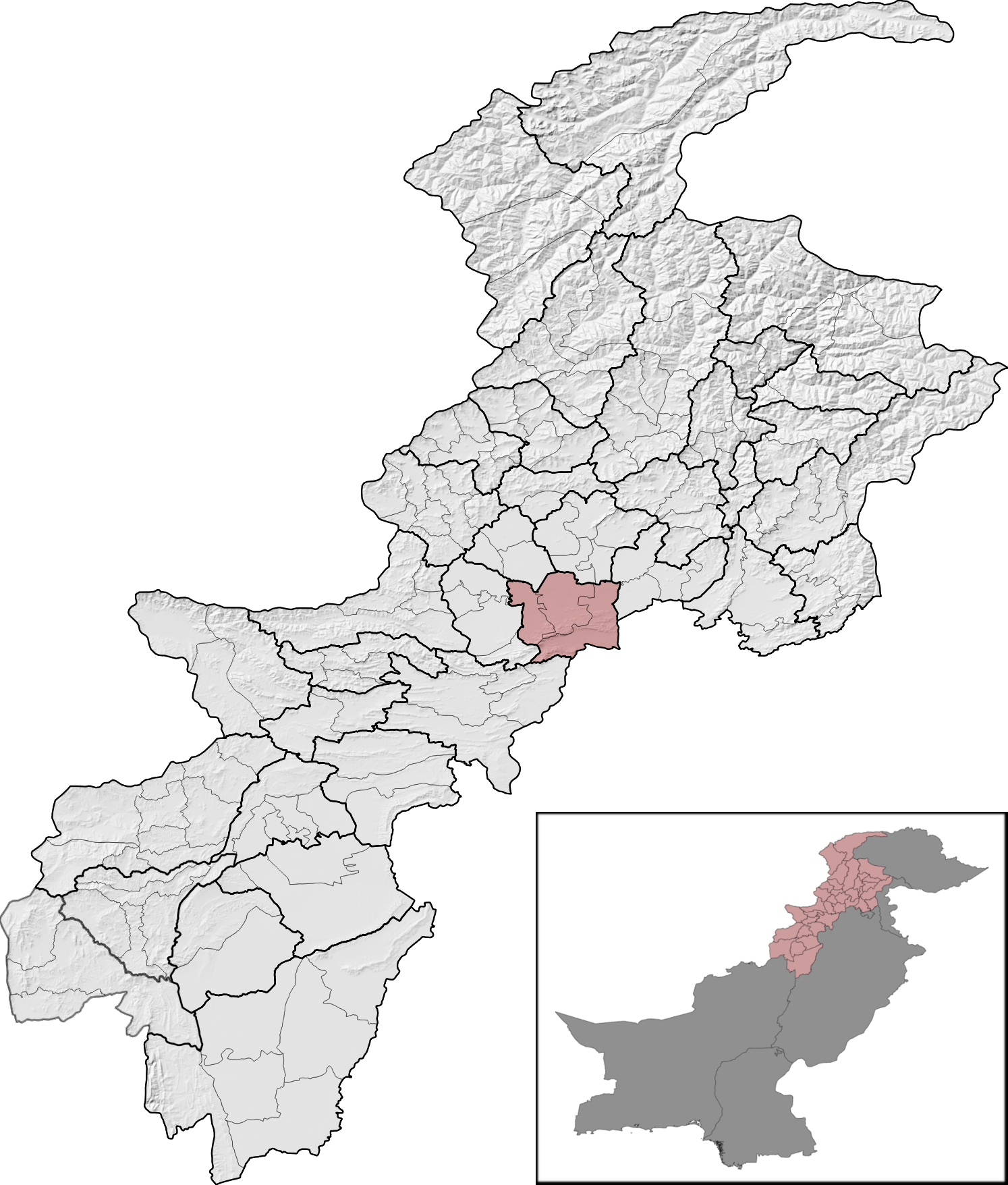
- Nowshera District (red) in Khyber Pakhtunkhwa
- Country: Pakistan
- Province: Khyber Pakhtunkhwa
- Division: Peshawar
- Headquarters: Nowshera
- Union Councils: 47

Government
  - Type: District Administration
  - Deputy Commissioner: N/A
  - District Police Officer: N/A
  - District Health Officer: N/A

Area
  - District of Khyber Pakhtunkhwa: 1,748 km^{2} (675 sq mi)

Population (2023)
  - District of Khyber Pakhtunkhwa: 1,740,705
  - Density: 995.8/km^{2} (2,579/sq mi)
  - Urban: 341,959 (19.64%)
  - Rural: 1,398,746 (80.36%)
- Time zone: UTC+5 (PST)
- Number of Tehsils: 3
- Website: nowshera.kp.gov.pk

Nowshera District (Pashto: نوښار ولسوالۍ, Urdu: ضلع نوشہرہ) is a district in the Peshawar Division of the Khyber Pakhtunkhwa province of Pakistan. The capital and district headquarter is Nowshera city.

== Overview and history ==
Nowshera was previously a tehsil (subdivision) of Peshawar. In 1988, it received the elevated status of district. It is bordered by Peshawar District to the west, Mardan District to the north, Charsadda District to the northwest, Swabi District to the northeast, Kohat District to the south, Orakzai Agency to the southwest and Attock District to the east.

Prior to its establishment as a separate district between 1988 and 1990, Nowshera was part of Peshawar District. The district was also part of the Peshawar Division until the reforms of The Government of Pakistan.

Total area of Nowshera is 1,748 km^{2}. The population density is 608 persons per square kilometre. The total agricultural area is 52,540 hectares. The main source of income of the region is agriculture.

== Demographics ==
=== Population ===
Historical population
Year	Pop.	±% p.a.
1951	222,527	—
1961	276,937	+2.21%
1972	410,718	+3.65%
1981	537,638	+3.04%
1998	874,373	+2.90%
2017	1,520,995	+2.96%
2023	1,740,705	+2.27%

As of the 2023 census, Nowshera district has 259,774 households and a population of 1,740,705. The district has a sex ratio of 103.78 males to 100 females and a literacy rate of 56.78%: 68.53% for males and 44.49% for females. 478,985 (27.6% of the surveyed population) are under 10 years of age. 341,959 (19.64%) live in urban areas.

=== Religion ===
Religion in contemporary Nowshera District
Religious group	1941		2017		2023	
Religious group	Pop.	%	Pop.	%	Pop.	%
Islam	194,084	88.92%	1,513,899	99.53%	1,725,710	99.43%
Hinduism	15,128	6.93%	896	0.06%	862	0.05%
Sikhism	6,636	3.04%	—N/a	—N/a	31	~0%
Christianity	652	0.30%	5,663	0.37%	8,886	0.51%
Others	1,758	0.81%	537	0.04%	43	0.01%
Total Population	218,258	100%	1,520,995	100%	1,735,689 (Note: Different from official population figure since it excludes sensitive areas where religion was not asked)	100%
Note: 1941 census data is for Nowshera tehsil of erstwhile Peshawar district, which roughly corresponds to contemporary Nowshera district. District and tehsil borders have changed since 1941.

=== Languages ===
Languages of Nowshera district (2023)
1. Pashto (95.0%)
2. Hindko (2.25%)
3. Punjabi (1.08%)
4. Urdu (0.99%)
5. Saraiki (0.11%)
6. Others (mainly Gujari, Kohistani) (0.53%)

At the time of the 2023 census, 95.04% of the population spoke Pashto, 2.25% Hindko, 1.08% Punjabi and 0.99% Urdu as their first language. Other minority spoken languages are Gujari and Kohistani. As per 2023 estimates by Tablue Public in Nowshera District Gujari along with Kohistani is spoken by 0.22% of the population. Saraiki is spoken by 0.11%.

== Education ==
Nowshera district is home to many educational institutions. This includes the University of Technology, Nowshera, Northern University, Nowshera, a campus of the Abdul Wali Khan University Mardan in Pabbi town, and also a campus of the University of Engineering and Technology Peshawar in Jalozai town. The district also has a public sector medical college: Nowshera Medical College.

It is also home to many degree colleges which include Government Post Graduate College Nowshera, Government Home Economics College Nowshera, Government College Akbarpura, Government Degree College Pabbi and Government Girls Degree College Pabbi.

According to the Alif Ailaan Pakistan District Education Rankings of 2017, Nowshera district was ranked 71 out of 155 districts in Pakistan in the quality of education while for facilities and infrastructure, the district was ranked 14 out of 155. A vast improvement from the rankings of 2016: the quality of education was ranked 71 out of 151, while facilities and infrastructure were ranked 42 out of 151.

== Administration and politics ==
The district is administratively divided into 3 Tehsils.

Tehsil	Name (Urdu) (Pashto)	Area (km^{2})	Pop. (2023)	Density (ppl/km^{2}) (2023)	Literacy rate (2023)	Union Councils
Jehangira Tehsil	(Urdu: تحصیل جہانگیرا)(Pashto: جهانګیره تحصیل)	718	434,984	100.72	56.92%	
Nowshera Tehsil	(Urdu: تحصیل نوشہرہ)(Pashto: نوښار تحصیل)	679	796,226	106.39	56.76%	
Pabbi Tehsil	(Urdu: تحصیل پبی)(Pashto: پبى تحصیل)	351	509,495	102.42	56.70%	

=== Union councils ===
The district is divided into 47 Union Councils. The largest by area is Nizampur & the smallest by area is Pabbi.

- Nowshera
- Chowki Town
- Tarkha
- Pabbi
- Dagi Banda
- Akbarpura
- Chowkai
- Taru Jabba
- Mohib Banda
- Aman Kot
- Kurvi
- Dag Behsud
- Dag Ismail Khel
- Saleh Khana
- Shah Kot
- Nizampur
- Kheshgi Bala
- Kheshgi Payan
- Aza Khel
- Pir Piai
- Ganderhi
- Rashakai
- Risalpur
- Gandaree
- Amangarh
- Manki Sharif
- Pahari Kati Khel
- Kahi
- Ziarat Kaka Sahib
- Badrashi
- Pir Sabaq
- Zaramiana
- Misri banda
- Mughalki (Nandrak)
- Jehangira
- Akora Khattak
- Mera Akora Khattak
- Shaidu
- Adamzai
- Chasmai
- Inzari
- Mandoori
- Khairabad
- Nawan Killi

=== Towns and villages ===
The main towns in Nowshera District are Nowshera city (Capital), Badrashi, Pabbi, Jalozai, Akora Khattak, Jehangira, Risalpur, Khairabad and Nizampur. The main villages are below.

- Ziarat Kaka sahib
- Durran
- Khawrai
- Kheshgi Bala
- Kheshgi Payan
- Dag Behsud
- Chowki Drab
- Dagi Jadeed
- Dagi Qadeem
- Banda Nabi
- Shaidu
- Azakhel Bala
- Azakhel Payan
- Rashakai
- Pirpiai
- Misri banda
- Pir Sabaq
- Taru Jabba
- Kurvi
- Dak Ismail Khel
- Chapri
- Saleh Khana
- Jabba Khattak
- Kotli Kalan
- Shah Kot
- spin kana kalan
- Jalozai
- Speen Khak
- Jaroba
- Mughalki
- pushtoon ghari
- Dheri Kati Khel
- Palosi Payan
- Palosi Bala
- Meraji

=== Cantonments ===
These cantonments were created by the British Raj. There are three cantonments in Nowshera District:

- Nowshera Cantonment
- Cherat Cantonment
- Risalpur Cantonment

=== Provincial Assembly ===
The district has 5 Provincial Seats in The Khyber-Pakhtunkhwa Assembly.

Member of Provincial Assembly	Party affiliation	Constituency	Year
Zar Alam Khan	Pakistan Tehreek-e-Insaf	PK-85 Nowshera-I	2024
Muhammad Idrees	Pakistan Tehreek-e-Insaf	PK-86 Nowshera-II	2024
Khaleeq ur Rehman	Pakistan Tehreek-e-Insaf	PK-87 Nowshera-III	2024
Mian Muhammad Umar	Pakistan Tehreek-e-Insaf	PK-88 Nowshera-IV	2024
Ishfaq Ahmed	Pakistan Tehreek-e-Insaf	PK-89 Nowshera-V	2024

=== National Assembly ===
The district has 2 National Assembly Seats in The National Assembly of Pakistan.

==== Since 2002: NA-5 (Nowshera-I) ====
Election	Member	Party
2002 2002	Qazi Hussain Ahmed, Molana Sami Ul Haq Saab	MMA
2008	Muhammad Tariq Khattak	PPPP
2013	Pervez Khattak	PTI
2013 By-election	Imran Khattak	PTI

==== Since 2002: NA-6 (Nowshera-II) ====
Election	Member	Party
2002	Maulana Hamid-ul-Haq Haqani	MMA
2008	Masood Abbas Khattak	ANP
2013	Siraj Muhammad Khan	PTI

The District is currently represented by Pakistan Tehreek-e-Insaaf who won all 7 Seats in the recent elections.

== Geography ==
The following are the rivers which flow through the Nowshera District.

- Bara River
- Kabul River
- Kal Pani River
- Swat River

Some of the most famous parks are as follows:

- Kund Park
- Mangloot Wildlife Park
- Aza Khel Park
- Jinnah Park
- Cherat Chapri Wildlife Park
- Water Disney Park

After the launch of CPEC project, Rashakai village of Nowshera is now an Economic Zone of KPK.

== Highways and motorways ==
- N-5 National Highway
- N-45 National Highway (Nowshera-Chitral)
- M1 Motorway
- Swat Motorway

== Military history ==
=== Military installations ===
- Pakistan Air Force Academy Risalpur Cantt
- Armoured Corps Centre Nowshera Cantt
- ASC School Nowshera Cantt
- School of Artillery Nowshera Cantt
- School of Armour and Mechanized Warfare
- Special Operations School Chirat Cantt
- Military College of Engineering (NUST) Risalpur Cantt
- ASC Center Nowshera Cantt
- College of Aeronautical Engineering PAF Academy Asghar Khan

== Buildings and institutions ==
Notable buildings

- Darul Uloom Haqqania
- Khushal Khan Khattak Library, Akora Khattak

Hospitals/medical facilities

- Qazi Hussain Ahmed Medical Complex – Nowshera City
- District Headquarters Hospital – Nowshera City
- LRBT Eye Hospital Akora Khattak – Nowshera City
- Combined Military Hospital – Nowshera Cantonment
- Combined Military Hospital – Risalpur Cantonment
- Cantt General Hospital Nowshera Cantt.
- A number of Rural Health Centers RHCs and Basi Health Units BHUs all over the district

=== Shrines ===
Nowshera District is the home of many Sufi shrines.

==== Shrine of Kastir Gul (Kaka Sahib) ====
The shrine of 16th century's most popular Sufi saint Sayyid Kastir Gul alias Hazrat Kaka Sahib is located in a rugged mountainous area around 12 km south of Nowshera district. It is considered one of the most frequently visited religious heritage sites in Khyber Pakhtunkhwa. Born on the first of Ramazan in 1576, Kaka Sahib had received religious education from his Sufi father, Hazrat Sheikh Syed Bahadur Baba, and few Islamic scholars of his time. He used to practice all four Sufi orders – Naqshbandia, Suharwardia, Chistia and Qadria. Kaka Sahib also fondly called as Ziaree Kaka used to deliver lessons to his devotees.

==== Shrine of Sheikh Syed Nadir Shah (Mast Baba) ====
The shrine of Syed Nadir Shah (Mast Baba) He was the father of Syed Sheikh Bahadur Baba (Abbak Sahib) and grand father of Syed Kasteer Gul (Kaka Sahib). He died on (02 Safar 969 Hijri) 1561-62 AD. The Shrine is located at Khawara village Khatak Territory Nowshera.

==== Shrine of Sheikh Bahadur Baba (Abbak Sahib) ====
The shrine of Sheikh Bahadur Baba is named after Sheikh Bahadur Baba. He was born at Khawara Village Khatak territory, on (15 Ramadan 941 Hijri) 1524 AD. After a life of full struggle for the prosperity of Islam and spreading of spiritual light in the region, he died on (14 Shaban 1027 Hijri) 1627 AD. He married once and had four Sons one died as an infant, and the remaining three are Syed Sheikh Afan Sahib and Syed Sheikh Hayat Sahib(Alias Sheikh Attaan Sahib) Syed Sheikh Kasteer Gul (Sheikh Rahamkar, Kaka Sahib). His descendants are known as Abbak Kheil and Kakakheil scattered all over Kpk province. The Shrine is located near(1.5 km) the village of Kana Khel.

==== Maslak Bahadur Baba ====
Bahadur Baba was follower of his father Mast Baba's maslak in Chishtiyyah and Suharwardiyah orders.

Bahadur Baba's famous followers

Main Wali Sahib, Main Shadi Sahib, sheikh Afan sahib, Sheikh Syed Kasteer Gul Sahib(Kaka Sahib), Akhund Mian Dad, Akhund Shareef Bali, Sheikh Allah Dad Khatak, Sheikh Nask, Faqeer Malik Meer.

==== Shrine of Akhund Panju Baba ====
The shrine of Akhund Pangu Baba is named after Syed Abdul Wahab commonly known as Akhund Panju Baba and Baba Sahib. It is located in Akbarpura town in Pabbi Tehsil of Nowshera. The shrine was attacked by Taliban militants in 2011 killing 11 people.

==== Shrine of Sheikh Baba ====
The shrine of Sheikh Shahbaz Baba is named after Sheikh Shahbaz Baba commonly known as Sheikh Baba. The shrine is located in Pabbi town near Grand Trunk (GT), Nowshera.

==== Shrine of Pir Sabaq Baba jee ====
The shrine of Pir sabaq baba jee named Sheikh Abdus Salam sahib commonly known as Sahib Mubarak is located in (Pir Sabaq Sharif) 5 km from Nowshera Cantt on left side of Peshawar-Pindi GT road (after crossing Kabul river at Pirsabaq bridge 1.5 km).

== Notable people ==
A list of some of the most prominent people from Nowshera District:

- Abdul Haq - Islamic scholar and founder of Daarul Uloom Haqqania
- Ajmal Khattak - President Awami National Party
- Raj Wali Shah Khattak - Poet, researcher, scholar and prominent figure in the region
- John Ormsby Evelyn Vandeleur - brigadier general, WWII British Army Commander XXX Corps during Operation Market Garden
- Alam Khattak, lieutenant general
- Gul Hassan Khan - Commander in Chief
- Sardar Ali Haqqani - Islamic scholar
- Qazi Hussain Ahmad - Former Ameer Jamat-i-Islami Pakistan
- Naseerullah Khan Babar - Former Interior Minister
- Pervez Khattak - former Chief Minister of Khyber Pakhtunkhwa and former Minister of Defence
- Sami ul Haq - senator
- Sher Zaman Taizi - poet and writer
- Sartaj Aziz- Former federal minister
- Nasrullah Khan Khattak Ex- CM
- Zarsanga - Pashto folk singer
- Mian jamshed Uddin Kakakhail - Former minister of excise and taxation.

== See also ==
- Khushal Khan Khattak
- Khattak
- Akora Khattak

== Bibliography ==
- 1981 District census report of Peshawar. Vol. 26. Islamabad: Population Census Organization, Statistics Division, Government of Pakistan. 1983. p. 86.
- 1998 District census report of Nowshera. Census publication. Vol. 55. Islamabad: Population Census Organization, Statistics Division, Government of Pakistan. 1999.
