= Badrashi =

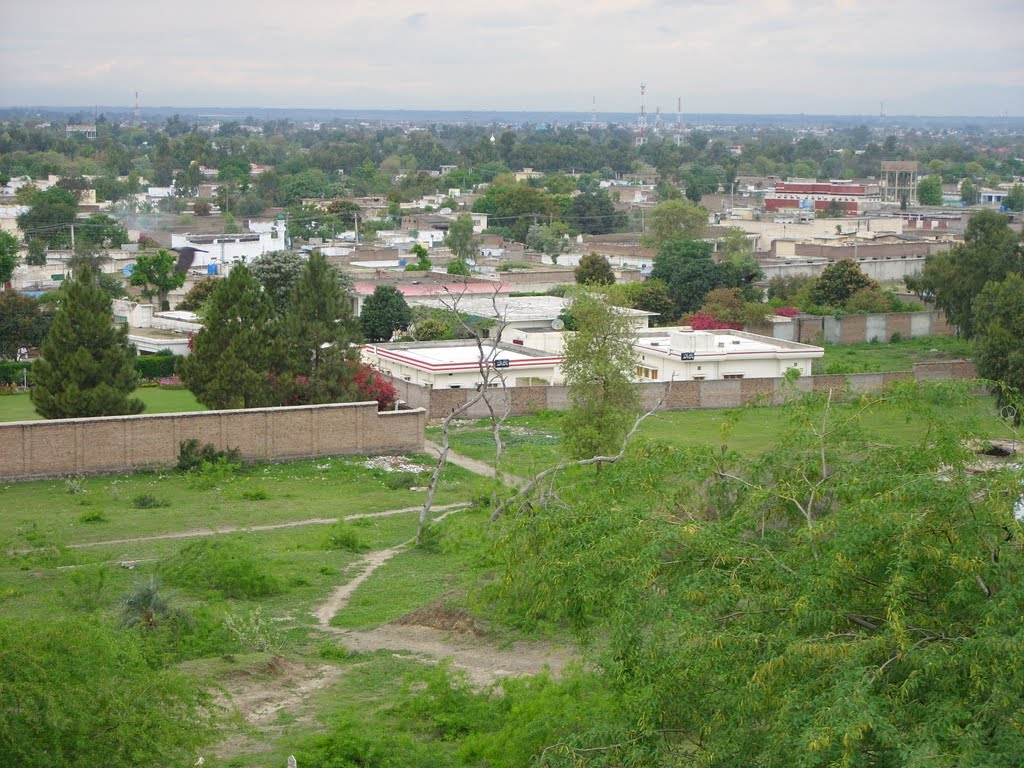

- Location within Khyber Pakhtunkhwa Location within Pakistan
- Country: Pakistan
- Province: Khyber-Pakhtunkhwa
- District: Nowshera District

Population (2017)
  - Total: 45,771
- Time zone: UTC+5 (PST)

Badrashi is a town in the Nowshera District in Khyber Pakhtunkhwa. It is located at 33°59′19″N 72°1′30″E.

== Overview ==
According to the latest census (2017), the population of Badrashi is 45,771.

Badrashi has 10 Mohallahs - Awaan, Eidgah, Miangaan, Aqa Khel, Essa Khel, Suleman Khel, Wati Khel, Riggi, Najeeb Abad, Raheem Abad, and Davy Hautekeete. There is additionally a state-run hospital located at New Raheem Abad Mohalla alongside two state-run high schools for boys and girls. Both schools are located at Mohallah Awaan - however, Badrashi only has one primary school. There are 28 mosques in total. Speen Jummat, the central mosque, is located in Essa Khel.

People from Badrashi include wicket keeper batsman Gohar Ali.

Different tribes such as Khiljis, Maliks, and Awan often take active participation in the democratic elections, of which the votes are significant as it is the constituency of politician Pervez Khattak.

== See also ==
- Nowshera
- Nowshera District
