= University of Technology, Nowshera =

Public university in Pakistan

Coordinates: 34.0055°N 71.9371°E

Shuhada-e-Army Public School University of Technology
- Type: Public
- Established: 2016
- Affiliations: Higher Education Commission (Pakistan), National Technology Council (Pakistan)
- Chancellor: Governor of Khyber Pakhtunkhwa
- Vice-Chancellor: Prof. Dr. Imran Khan
- Location: Nowshera, Khyber Pakhtunkhwa, Pakistan
- Nickname: UOT
- Website: uotnowshera.edu.pk

The Shuhada-e-Army Public School University of Technology (colloquially known as UOT) is a public university located in Nowshera, Khyber Pakhtunkhwa, Pakistan. It is the first public university in Nowshera District and also the first technical university in Khyber Pakhtunkhwa province.

== Departments ==
The university consists of the following departments:

- Department of Electrical Engineering Technology
- Department of Electronics Engineering Technology
- Department of Mechanical Engineering Technology
- Department of Civil Engineering Technology
- Department of Information Engineering Technology
- Department of Energy Engineering Technology

== Academic programs ==
Following degree programs are offered at the university:

- B.Sc. Electrical Engineering Technology
- B.Sc. Electronics Engineering Technology
- B.Sc. Civil Engineering Technology
- B.Sc. Mechanical Engineering Technology
- B.Sc. Information Engineering Technology
- B.Sc. Energy Engineering Technology

== See also ==
- Northern University, Nowshera
- Government Post Graduate College Nowshera
- National University of Technology, Islamabad
- Punjab Tianjin University of Technology, Lahore
- Mir Chakar Khan Rind University of Technology, Dera Ghazi Khan
