= Zakhi =

2022 flood affectees support

- Coordinates: 34°3′25″N 71°43′18″W

Zakhi, literally smart and strong, (Zakhi-Miana, Zakhi-Kohna or Zakhi Qadeem, Zakhi-Charbagh, and Zahi-Qabristan) is a village in the Nowshera district of the Khyber Pakhtunkhwa Province of Pakistan. The population is around 15,000; the majority work in agriculture, others in government, and some work outside the country. The villagers are 99% ethnic Pashtun tribes and 1% non-Pashtun. Residents speak Hindko or Persian languages.

== Geography ==
Zakhi is located near Akbarpura on Peshawar-Islamabad Motorway in Nowshera District. It is bounded by the Kabul River in the north and the Bara River in the east. It is nearly 15 km from Peshawar on Grand Trunk Road 45 km from Nowshera. Charsadda is across the Kabul River on the north about 25 km away.

== History ==
Mostly Afghan Pashtun came to this area around 1557 with Bairam Khan who ruled on behalf of Mughal Emperor Akbar the Great. Around 1834 this was ruled by Maharaja Ranjit Singh.

Due to its location near the River Kabul, the area, particularly Zakhi, is at risk of flooding. In the 18th century, a flood destroyed the village. After this catastrophe, Zakhi was subdivided into four villages: Zakhi-Miana, Zakhi-Qabristan, Zakhi-Kona, and Zakhi-Charbagh.

The names were derived from ancient Persian. The meaning of "Zakhi" remains unclear. The name likely predates the arrival of the Pashtuns.

Akbarpura and the surrounding area were home to Muslims, Hindus, Sikhs, and Christians, living peacefully until the 1947 partition of India. The people of Zakhi supported Khan Abdul Ghaffar Khan Frontier Gandhi during the independence struggle, and Gandal Khan Baba was appointed the first Jarnails (General) of Khudai Khidmatgar movement from Zakhi Miana in 1930. After partition, the Zakhi area became part of Pakistan.

Before Partition, under British Administration, a boys' school, a small road and an irrigation system (canals and watercourses) were built in the1930s.

In 2010, a major flood damaged infrastructure such as buildings, roads, crops and irrigation systems. The flood left nearly 20% homeless. Zakhi was mainly hit by Bara river. This was the first time in history that such a massive flood hit this area. One possible reason for the flood was the weakening of the dyke due to removal of soil by the locals. UN organizations, US AID, Japanese AID, NRC, RDP Muslim Hands, and Islamic Relief worked through local NGOs to help with flood recovery.

== Demographics ==
The literacy rate is 90% for men and 85% for women. This percentage includes people able to write only their name.

Employment is mostly in agriculture, but includes:

- Agriculture workers 50%;
- Technicians 15%;
- Professionals 10%;
- Elementary occupations 3.6%;
- Service and shop workers 2%;
- Craft and related trade workers 2%;
- Clerks 2%
- Armed forces 1%;
- other 2.4%.

== Politics ==
As of 2024, Zakhi now had an M.P.A reserved for a woman. Shagufta Malik was selected Parliamentarian. This area used to be the stronghold of Awami National Party (ANP). In 2008-2013, Parveez Khan Kattak PK-13 and Eng:Muhammad Tariq Khattak NA-5 of were elected Parliamentarians. However, Pakistan Tehreek-e-Insaf (PTI) won the seat of pK-13 as well as NA-5 and Pervaiz Khattak CM KPK was successful.

== Agriculture ==
The area has fertile lands where vegetables and fruits are produced. Tomatoes are grown in abundance and exported, especially to Karachi. Pears, peaches and aalu bukhara are also grown and exported. Among other cash crops are sugarcane and wheat. Haji Umar Khan and his brother Gul Rehman were the leading agriculture exporters from the 1930s to the 1980s. Faras Gul and Fazal Rahim are the top businessmen and transporters of fruits.

== Development ==
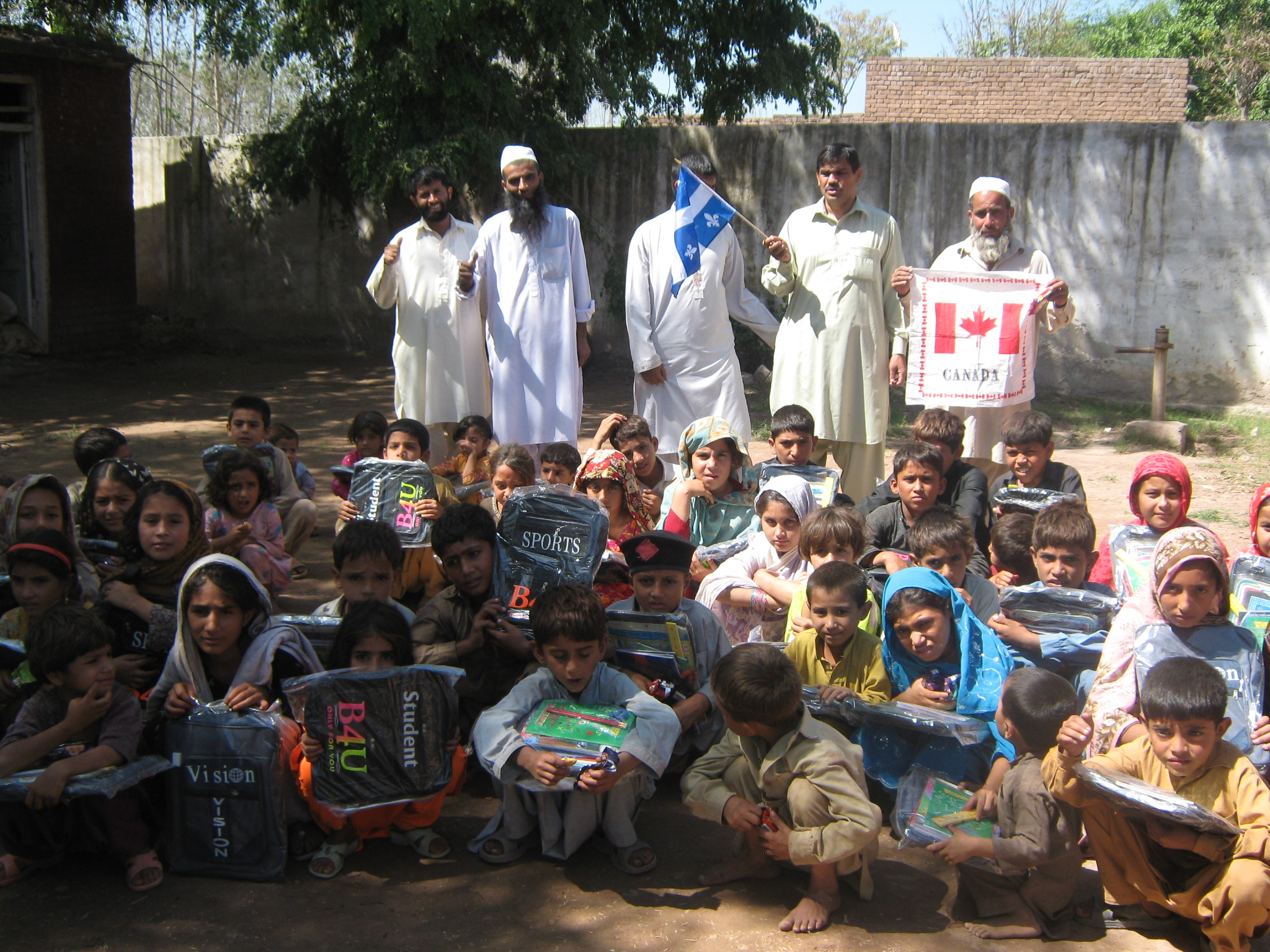
2010 flood affectees school children in zakhi

This part of Pakistan and specially of Khyber Pukhtunkhwa is one of the most peaceful areas in the country (2013). Many projects were carried out there by the government.
