= Nizampur National Park =

National park in Pakistan

- نظام پور نیشنل پارک
- Location: Nowshera District, Khyber Pakhtunkhwa, Pakistan
- Area: 5,236 acres (2,119 ha)
- Established: January 2022
- Governing body: Provincial government of Khyber Pakhtunkhwa

The Nizampur National Park (Urdu: نظام پور نیشنل پارک) is situated in the Nowshera District of the Khyber Pakhtunkhwa province in Pakistan.

== History ==
In January 2022, the provincial government declared it a national park, as a step to maintain and preserve the flora and animals as well as their habitats in varied ecosystems. This park includes a land of 5,236 acres, and it comprises Qamar Mela and Khwara blocks in the Peshawar Forest Division.
