= Daylight saving time in Pakistan =

Since 2002, Pakistan previously implemented Daylight Saving Time (DST) multiple times, adjusting local time from UTC+05:00 to UTC+06:00 during different summer periods. As of 2009, the nation no longer uses DST.

- In 2002, DST was observed from the first Sunday in April (April 7) at 00:00 to the first Sunday in October (October 6) at 00:00. The Cabinet of Pakistan had chosen to do this "in order to make maximum use of daylight and to save energy."
- In 2008, DST began on June 1, and was initially set to run through August 31 to meet the annual shortfall of 4 gigawatts of electricity rather than enforcing daily power cuts in households and factories. The government later extended the end date to October 31, including the holy month of Ramadan, which had begun prior in the first few days of September. Pakistan's usage of DST originally was required to end on August 31st.
- In 2009, DST was observed from April 15 through October 31. This was Pakistan's final usage of DST - it has not been observed throughout the nation since.

== See also ==
- Pakistan Standard Time
- Time in Pakistan
- Time in India
