= Syed Wajid Hussain =

Pakistani general

Lieutenant-General Syed Wajid Hussain

Personal details
- Awards: Hilal-i-Imtiaz (Military)

Military service
- Allegiance: Pakistan
- Branch/service: Pakistan Army

Syed Wajid Hussain HI(M), AC is a retired Pakistani army general who served as the Chairman of Heavy Industries Taxila and Commandant School of Armour and Mechanized Warfare.
