= Sardar Ali Haqqani =

Pakistani Islamic scholar (1970–2022)

Mawlānā Sardar Ali Haqqani
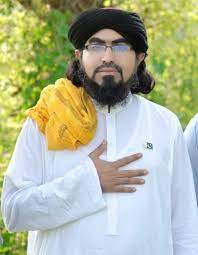

Personal life
- Born: 1970 Maini, Swabi District, Khyber Pakhtunkhwa, Pakistan
- Died: 7 May 2022 (aged 51–52) Dara Adamkhel, Khyber Pakhtunkhwa, Pakistan
- Cause of death: Traffic collision
- Political party: PHRP; ASWJ
- Education: Darul Uloom Haqqania
- Other name: Tawajju Ustaad

Religious life
- Religion: Islam
- Denomination: Sunni
- Movement: Deobandi

Sardar Ali Haqqani (1970 – 2022) also known as "Tawajju Ustaad" was a Pakistani Islamic scholar from Nowshera district, who was known on social media for his bold speeches in Pashto.

He was also the Amir of Nowshera District of Aalmi Majlis Tahaffuz Khatm-e-Nubuwwat.

He died in a traffic accident on 7 May 2022.

== Early life ==
He was born in 1970 in Maini, Swabi District. He received his early education in Charsadda from Darul Uloom Jamia Muhammadiyah Matta Mughalkhel, a madrassa established by Haq Nawaz Haqqani. Then he studied Hadith and specialization from Darul Uloom Haqqania.

Haqqani was nominated in 2018 by Pakistan Rah-e-Haq Party and Ahl-e-Sunnat Wal Jamaat Nowshera as joint candidate on PK-63 and issued party ticket. However, he managed to get only 1113 votes in this election and PTI candidate Mian Jamshed Uddin Kakakhel won this constituency with 24760 votes.

== Arrest ==
He was arrested on 28 April 2021, for making provocative speeches against doctors and nurses.

In a speech on 10 June 2021, he was arrested for inciting the public to carry out a suicide attack on Nobel laureate Malala Yousafzai.

== Assassination attempt ==
On 3 February 2022, during a meeting in Swabi, a man carried out a failed assassination attempt in which he was injured. However, the assailant was arrested along with the device.

== Death ==
Haqqani died in a traffic accident on 7 May 2022. The accident took place on Kohat Road near Dara Adamkhel and his bodyguards and driver were injured in the accident.

== See also ==
- List of Deobandis
