= Rashakai Special Economic Zone =

- Type: Special Economic Zone
- Legal status: Operational
- Headquarters: Rashakai, Nowshera, Khyber Pakhtunkhwa, Pakistan
- Coordinates: 34.06886569063311°N 72.14508907420402°E

The Rashakai Special Economic Zone (Rashakai SEZ) is a key initiative within the China–Pakistan Economic Corridor (CPEC) framework. Positioned in Rashakai, Nowshera, Khyber Pakhtunkhwa, it stands as one of the nine special economic zones planned for establishment between 2017 and 2030 as part of the CPEC initiative. Covering an area of around 1,000 acres, the zone's development is organized into three distinct phases.

On 21 July 2023, former Prime Minister Shehbaz Sharif officially opened the first phase of the Rashakai SEZ. Subsequently, on the next day, Muhammad Azam Khan, the Caretaker Chief Minister of Khyber Pakhtunkhwa, also inaugurated Phase-I of the Rashakai Special Economic Zone.

== Construction ==
The construction for the initial phase of the Rashakai SEZ concluded in March 2023, surpassing the anticipated completion date of December 2023. The Khyber Pakhtunkhwa Economic Zones Development and Management Company (KP-EZDMC), a government-owned entity, played a central role in achieving this early completion.

== Infrastructure ==
The initial phase of the Rashakai SEZ spans across 247 acres, offering essential infrastructure. This includes dedicated internal roads, drainage systems (inclusive of an effluent treatment plant), an 11kV power supply, gas connections, and communication networks up to the zero point of the zone for enterprises. Additionally, the phase incorporates tailored facilities such as a workshop, complex building, apartments, and other necessary civil works to support the zone's operations.

== Impact ==
The Rashakai SEZ, strategically located near the M-1 motorway and Torkham border crossing, is anticipated to be a pivotal development for Khyber Pakhtunkhwa. Its promising location is likely to attract both domestic and foreign investors, stimulating economic growth and projections indicate over 70,000 direct and 250,000 indirect employment opportunities.
