= Kabul River railway station =

Railway station in Nowshera, Pakistan

Coordinates: 34.018374°N 71.992579°E

General information
- System: Nowshera, Nowshera District, Khyber Pakhtunkhwa, Pakistan
- Owner: Ministry of Railways
- Line: Pakistan Railways

Other information
- Station code: KVB

History
- Former names: Great Indian Peninsula Railway
Location

The Kabul River railway station (Urdu: کابل دریا ریلوے اسٹیشن) is a Pakistan Railways train station in northwestern Pakistan.

It is located on the Kabul River in the city of Nowshera, in the Nowshera District of Khyber Pakhtunkhwa.

It formerly served the Great Indian Peninsula Railway.

== See also ==
- List of railway stations in Pakistan
- Pakistan Railways
