= Syed Shah Ahad Ali Shah =

Member of the National Assembly of Pakistan (MNA) rom Nowshera (2024–2029)

- سید شاہ احد علی شاہ

Member of the National Assembly of Pakistan
- In office 29 February 2024 – 10 May 2026
- Preceded by: Pervez Khattak
- Constituency: NA-33 Nowshera-I

Personal details
- Party: PTI (2024-present)

Syed Shah Ahad Ali Shah (Urdu: سید شاہ احد علی شاہ), is a Pakistani politician who has been a member of the National Assembly of Pakistan since February 2024.

== Political career ==
Shah won the 2024 Pakistani general election from NA-33 Nowshera-I as an Independent candidate. He received 90,145 votes while runners up Pervez Khattak of Pakistan Tehreek-e-Insaf Parliamentarians received 25,582 votes.
