= Karachi Time =

Time zone

Karachi Time (Urdu: کراچی وقت, abbreviated as KART, LMT or Local Mean Time) was a time zone set at UTC+04:28:12 ahead of Greenwich Mean Time and observed prior until 1907 in Karachi. The local time was established by the Karachi Chamber of Commerce & Industry. From 1951 to 1971, the term Karachi Time was again used to denote UTC+05:00 for West Pakistan abbreviated as KART as opposed to Dacca Time (DACT) used in East Pakistan.

== See also ==
- Pakistan Standard Time
- Time in Pakistan
