= Nizampur, Khyber Pakhtunkhwa =

Nizampur
- Town
- Interactive map of Nizampur
- Country: Pakistan
- Province: Khyber-Pakhtunkhwa
- District: Nowshera District
- Time zone: UTC+5 (PST)

Nizampur is a town in Jehangira tehsil of Nowshera district in Khyber Pakhtunkhwa. It is located at 33°47'7N 72°1'27E and has an altitude of 329 metres (1082 feet). The area contains reserves of iron ore.

== Villages ==
The villages in Nizampur are below.

- Mastana
- shams Abad
- Inzari
- Shagai
- Tarkhil
- Khan Kohi
- Namal Payan
- Namal Bala
- Piran Payan
- Piran Bala
- Jabbai
- Mandori
- Siavi
- Mama Khel

- Junghre
- Shawangi
- Asu Khel
- Gaju Khel
- Nama Payen
- Mir Kalan
- Amiro
- Garu
- Banda Abdul Karim Baba
- Maroba

- Qamar mela
- Saratoha
- Gandab
- Hisartang
- Charpani
- Mandhore
- Kahi/Khai
- Jabbi
- Darwazgaye
- Kahu/Nehlab

== Education ==
- Govt. Girls Degree College Khan Kohi Nizampur Nowshera
- Govt Maulana Abdul Haq Degree College Khan Kohi Nizampur Nowshera

== Administrative units ==
- Nowshera District
- Jehangira Tehsil
- Village Councils
