= Nowshera Medical College =

Public sector medical school in Nowshera, Pakistan

- Type: Public
- Established: 2017
- Location: Nowshera, Pakistan
- Website: https://nmcn.edu.pk/

Nowshera Medical College is a public sector medical school in Nowshera District, Khyber Pakhtunkhwa, Pakistan. It was established in 2017.
