= Naseerullah Babar =

Pakistani politician and former Army General

Major-General Naseerullah Khan Babar
- Naseerullah Khan Babar (1928–2011)

28th Minister for Interior
- In office 21 October 1993 – 5 November 1996
- President: Farooq Leghari
- Prime Minister: Benazir Bhutto
- Preceded by: Fateh Khan Bandial
- Succeeded by: Omar Khan Afridi

Special Advisor on Internal Affairs
- In office 2 December 1988 – 6 August 1990
- President: Ghulam Ishaq Khan
- Prime Minister: Benazir Bhutto

12th Governor of Khyber Pakhtunkhwa Province
- In office 1 March 1975 – 6 July 1977
- President: Fazal Ilahi Chaudhry
- Preceded by: Syed Ghawas
- Succeeded by: Abdul Hakeem Khan

Personal details
- Born: 1928 Pirpiai, North West Frontier Province, British India
- Died: 10 January 2011 (aged 82–83) Peshawar, Khyber Pakhtunkhwa Province
- Resting place: Pirpiai, Khyber Pakhtunkhwa Province, Pakistan
- Party: Pakistan Peoples Party
- Relatives: Maria Babar (daughter, adopted)
- Education: Presentation Convent School, Peshawar; Pakistan Military Academy, Dehra Dun, Burn Hall
- Occupation: Military administrator
- Profession: Politician
- Cabinet: Zulfikar Bhutto Government; Benazir Bhutto Government
- Awards: Sitara-e-Jurat (1971); Hilal-i-Jur'at (1973)

Military service
- Allegiance: Pakistan
- Branch/service: Pakistan Army
- Years of service: 1948–1974
- Rank: Major General
- Unit: Pakistan Army Artillery Corps
- Commands: 23 Division, Jehlum; IG Frontier Corps; DG Military Intelligence
- Battles/wars: Indo-Pakistani War of 1947; Indo-Pakistani War of 1965; Indo-Pakistani War of 1971

Naseerullah Khan Babar (Urdu: نصیر اللہ خان بابر; born 1928 – 10 January 2011) was a Pakistani army officer, diplomat, and politician who served as the 28th Interior Minister of Pakistan from 1993 to 1996. A member of the Pakistan Peoples Party, he also served as the 12th Governor of Khyber Pakhtunkhwa Province between 1975 and 1977. He was a retired 2-star general officer in the Pakistan Army, and later career military officer-turned-statesman. During 1974, Babar was tasked to fund and train Tajik rebels, by the order of Prime Minister Zulfiqar Ali Bhutto, to stage uprising against the government of Sardar Mohammed Daoud Khan. The operation was a huge success for Pakistan as Daoud Khan was forced to change his way and end his support to Anti-Pakistani militants. Babar then proceeded to retire from the army to start his career in politics. He became Governor of the Khyber-Pakhtunkhwa from 1975 to 1977 under Zulfiqar Ali Bhutto's government until the term was cut short due to Operation Fair Play— a clandestine operation undertaken to remove Bhutto. In 1988, Babar served as the Special Advisor on Internal Affairs in Benazir Bhutto's first government. Between 1993 and 1996, he tenured as the Interior Minister during Benazir Bhutto's second government where he supervised and successfully contended Operation Blue Fox.

Babar is also credited with successfully curbing targeted killings and criminal activities in Karachi in the 1990s. He took the charge of Sindh police and effectively dealt with criminal activities, which were at that time rampant in Karachi, by 1996.

Babar was a collector of antique art and Buddha statues. Before Aziz Deri was declared archeological site in 1996, among others, Naseerullah Babar purchased several artifacts and statues from the area over the years. He kept them at his Peshawar Town residence which were later donated to the state after his death.

== Early life and education ==
Babar was born in 1928 in Pirpiai near Pabbi, Nowshera district, North West Frontier Province, British India. His family is from the Babar tribe of Pakhtuns and hails from the village of Pirpiai in district Nowshera.

Babar's early education was from Presentation Convent School, Peshawar, North West Frontier Province, British India, between 1935 and 1939. From 1939 to 1941 he attended Burn Hall School then located at Srinagar. The school was subsequently shifted to Abbottabad after the Partition of India in 1947. He then attended Prince of Wales Royal Indian Military College from 1941 to 1947 in Dehradun, India, and joined the Pakistan Army in 1948. He was a member of the first Pakistan Military Academy long course which graduated in 1950.

== Army career ==
Having started his military career in 1948, Babar rose to become a Major General and led the Frontier Corps as its Commandant in 1974.

In his long career in the Army, Babar served in the Artillery Corps and pioneered the Army Aviation Corps. During the 1965 war with India, Babar while flying a helicopter along with Major Akram landed near an Indian military position believing it to be a Pakistani military position. The position housed 70 Indian soldiers at that time. Upon realization Babar told them that they are surrounded by the Pakistani army and should surrender. Babar single-handedly captured an entire company of Indian army soldiers (70 POWs) and walked them back to the Pakistani territory. For his action he was awarded Sitara-e-Jurat while Major Akram was awarded Tamgha-e-Quaid-e-Azam.

In the 1971 war, he commanded an artillery brigade supporting 23 Division and later commanded an infantry brigade until he was wounded and evacuated from the battlefield. He also had the distinction of having been awarded SJ & Bar. In 1972, he was appointed Inspector General Frontier Corps. He resigned from the Army in 1974 while commanding an infantry division and was appointed Governor of Khyber-Pakhtunkhwa.

In 1974, Babar was tasked with training and funding rebels against Mohammad Daoud Khan. It was in retaliation of Daoud Khan's funding of militancy against Pakistan, and an armed incursion by Afghan army in the Bajaur Campaign. In 1975, Babar trained rebels staged their first uprising in the Panjshir valley. Ahmad Shah Massoud and Gulbuddin Hekmatyar were among the rebels trained by Babar. The 1975 Panjshir Valley uprising had been described as the first operation conducted by Inter-Service Intelligence (ISI) in Afghanistan. The uprising, though unsuccessful, had changed Daoud Khan's ways to put an end to his proxy war against Pakistan.

== Joining the PPP ==
Babar joined the Pakistan People's Party (the PPP) in 1977 after the arrest of Zulfiqar Ali Bhutto. He famously threw away his Hilal i Jurat (with bar) and other army medals at the presiding officer of a military tribunal, when Zulfiqar Ali Bhutto was hanged by the military regime of General Muhammad Zia-ul-Haq in 1979.

== Interior Minister 1993–1996 ==
In 1988, Babar was a Special Assistant to the Prime Minister, Benazir Bhutto and successfully ran the election for Begum Nusrat Bhutto from Chitral during the preceding elections.

Elected in the 1993 general election on a People's Party ticket from Nowshera, he defeated Awami National Party President Ajmal Khattak, with the PPP's victory in the election and was appointed Federal Minister for the Interior by Benazir Bhutto.

General Babar was also involved in a crackdown on the militant wing of MQM in the 1990s. His actions effectively brought law and order to Karachi city.

In 1995, Babar boasted to Saudi intelligence head Turki bin Faisal Al Saud's chief of staff that under his direction Pakistan's interior ministry had largely created the Taliban in Afghanistan; Babar fondly referred to the Taliban as "my boys."

== 1997 and onwards ==
After the dismissal of Benazir Bhutto's second government by then President Farooq Leghari, Babar contested the 1997 elections again from Nowshera as well as from Karachi. He lost in Nowshera to Awami National Party candidate Wali Muhammad Khan and in Karachi to Nawaz Sharif's nominee Ejaz Shafi.

Contesting again in the 2002 general elections, he lost in the electoral sweep of the religio-political alliance of Muttahida Majlis-e-Amal, mainly due to Musharaff's goals of bringing Islamists in Khyber-Pakhtunkhwa and Balochistan to power.

In October 2007, he left the Pakistan Peoples Party due to his disagreement with Benazir Bhutto over her support for General Pervez Musharraf. This action was considered as a major blow for the Pakistan Peoples Party because he was their major political leader in Khyber-Pakhtunkhwa.

== Death ==
On 19 August 2008, Naseerullah Babar suffered a mild stroke and was admitted to a hospital. He recovered and returned home in November 2008. Naseerullah Babar died on 10 January 2011. He is buried in the family graveyard in Pirpai, Nowshera district.

Political offices
Preceded by Syed Ghawas	Governor of Khyber-Pakhtunkhwa; 1976–1977	Succeeded by Abdul Hakeem Khan
Preceded by Fateh Khan Bandial	Interior Minister of Pakistan; 1993–1996	Succeeded by Omar Khan Affridi
