= Khawari =

Coordinates: 33°54′N 72°10′E

Khawari is a village of Jehangira Tehsil, Nowshera District in the Khyber Pakhtunkhwa province of Pakistan.

The total Population of the village is around 7000. Most of the people of this village work abroad.
