= Bara River =

River in Pakistan

Coordinates: 34°06′N 71°45′E

Bara

Basin features
- Progression: Kabul→ Indus→ Arabian Sea

Bara River (Pashto: باړه سیند; Urdu: دریائے باڑہ) is a river in Khyber District in the Peshawar Division of Khyber Pakhtunkhwa province in Pakistan. The Bara River originates in the Tirah Valley of Bara Tehsil, Khyber District. It joins the Kabul River Canal which originates from the Warsak Dam, and re-enters Peshawar. Then it flows in a north-easterly direction to the Nowshera District, eventually joining the Kabul River near Camp Koruna, Akbarpura. Due to its higher elevation, very limited areas flow through gravity into Bara river.

The Bara River is noted to have some pollutants - including both from industry and from village sewage, the river flows all year round due to melting snow and rainfall, the highest flows are April and May while January has the lowest.

== History ==
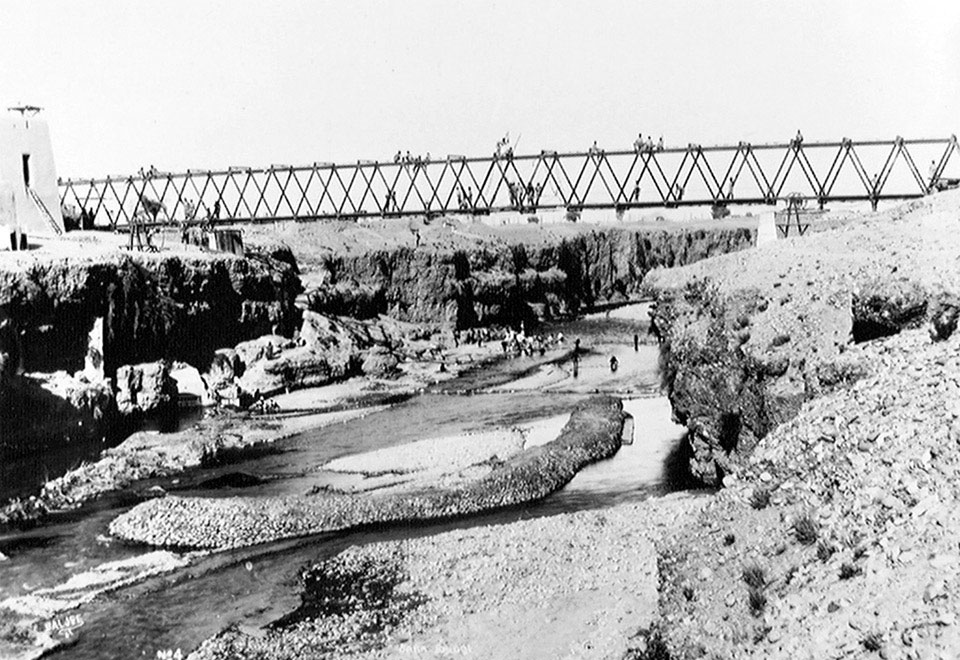
Photo of Bara Bridge over the Bara River - 1930

In 1930 during the colonial era, a bridge was built across the river - it was primarily designed for carrying infantry and military equipment and was opened for traffic on 23 November of that year, it was dismantled in 1933 after being superseded by another bridge.

== See also ==
- Bara, Khyber Pakhtunkhwa
- Bara Tehsil
- Kabul River topics
