= Azakhel Bala =

- Town
- Location in Pakistan
- Coordinates: 33°59′37″N 71°49′15″E
- Country: Pakistan
- Region: Khyber Pakhtunkhwa
- District: Nowshera District

Population (25000)
  - Total: 25,000
- Time zone: UTC+5 (PST)

Azakhel Bala is a village of Nowshera District, Khyber Pakhtunkhwa, Pakistan. It lies along the Grand Trunk Road and Pir Paiai Railway, some 15 kilometres (9.3 mi) west of Nowshera. The majority of the population of Azakhel Bala is engaged in agriculture, mainly potatoes, sugar cane, wheat, corn, tomato, cucumber, and numerous other vegetables. According to the Pakistan Forest Institute, "pale yellow silt-stone forms the soil parent material near Azakhel Bala village." There is an Afghan Refugee Camp located here.

== Education ==
=== Public schools ===
- Government High School Aza Khel Bala for Boys
- Government Higher & Secondary School Aza Khel Bala for Girls
- Government Middle School Aza Khel Bala for Boys
- Government Primary School Aza Khel Bala No,1 for Boys
- Government Primary School Aza Khel Bala No,2 for Boys
- Government Primary School Aza Khel Bala No,3 for Boys
- Government Primary School Aza Khel Bala No,1 for Girls

=== Private schools ===
- Nida model school azakhel bala
- Aqsa Public School
- Aza Khel Learning Academy
- Shah khalid memorial School
- Islamia Public School
- Iqra Jannatul Hufaz
- Iqra Raozatul Atfal
- Alkhidmat Foundation School
- Usmani Hifz-ul-Quran Academy

== Islamic education ==
- Daruloom ul Islamia
- Jamia Faredia
- Dar Ul Qura ( Masjid-e-Madani) Mohalla Islamabad
