= Taru Jabba =

Village of Nowshera district, Pakistan

Taru Jabba is a village of Nowshera district, in Pakistan's Khyber Pakhtunkhwa province. The village is located 11 km away from Peshawar city. The great shrine of Pir Syed Noor Ali Shah Aljilani, Islamic Scholar Maulavi Inayat Ullah Harooni in the village. It is famous for its Chapli kebab. Rambel Khan Chapli Kabab is very famous around the country.
