= Lowari Tunnel =

Tunnel in Hindukush mountains built to connect Chitral with the rest of the country

Lowari Tunnel لواری سرنگ
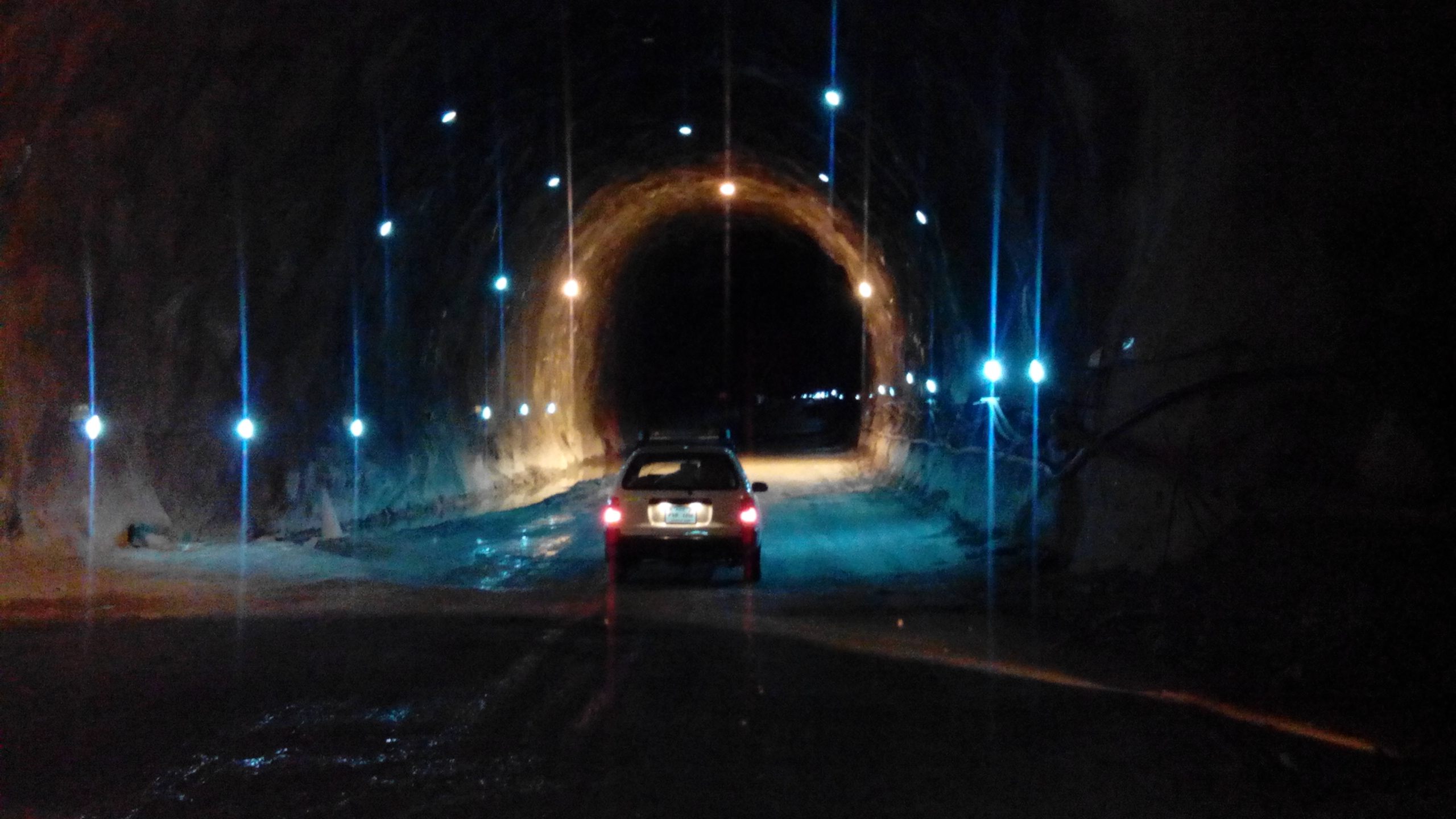
- Lowari Tunnel
- Interactive map of Lowari Tunnel لواری سرنگ

Overview
- Location: Upper Dir, Khyber Pakhtunkhwa, Pakistan
- Coordinates: 35°21′0″N 71°48′0″E
- Status: Fully Functional
- Route: Dir-Chitral Highway
- Crosses: Lowari Pass

Operation
- Work began: September 2005
- Opened: July 2017

Technical
- Length: Tunnel 1: 8.5 kilometres (5.3 mi); Tunnel 2: 1.9 kilometres (1.2 mi)
- No. of lanes: 2

Lowari Tunnel (Urdu: لواری سرنگ, Lowari Surang) consists of two separate tunnels, and the combined length of both tunnels is 10.4 kilometers (6.5 miles). It is a vehicular tunnel under the Lowari Pass of the Hindu Kush mountains, between Dir and Chitral in Khyber Pakhtunkhwa province of Pakistan. The tunnel effectively bypassed Pakistan's reliance on Afghanistan to reach Chitral region. It is operated by the National Highway Authority and carries traffic on the N-45 National Highway, thus bypassing Lowari Pass. Construction was partly completed by June 2017. By late 2018, the tunnel was open to vehicular traffic for at least ten hours per day.

The total cost of the tunnel was Rs. 26.954 billion (US$96 million). The tunnel is one of the longest tunnels in South Asia, and is the longest in Pakistan, superseding the 3.91 km (2.43 mi) Khojak Tunnel in 2018.

== History ==
Originally conceived as a railway tunnel, construction began in September 1975 and was inaugurated by Prime Minister Zulfiqar Ali Bhutto. However, less than a year later work stopped in 1976 due to non allocation of funds.

Construction resumed in September 2005 by Pervez Musharraf Govt, and the tunnel was initially expected to be completed by 2009; with conversion into a vehicle road tunnel. This is one of the mega highway projects initiated in 2005 during the government of Pervez Musharraf. But work was stopped at times due to a shortage of funds, and at others due to a change in design and security reasons.

Work on the new plan started in 2013 and the project was completed in 2017.

== Benefit ==
- The tunnel essentially allows traffic on the N45 National Highway to bypass the Lowari Pass and reduces the 14 hour drive between Chitral and Peshawar to only 7 hours.
- The tunnel also facilitates all-weather transportation, as during the long winter season the Lowari Pass is closed, and travelers to and from Chitral used to travel into Kunar, Afghanistan and then back into Pakistan to access the rest of the country.
- Lower tunnel has effectively bypassed Pakistan's reliance on Afghanistan to access Chitral region.
- The tunnel is facilitating economic development in the Chitral district, as of late 2018.
