= Government Post Graduate College Nowshera =

Pakistani college

Coordinates: 34°00′21.4″N 71°59′21.3″E

- Type: Public
- Established: 1956
- Location: Nowshera Cantonment, Khyber Pakhtunkhwa, Pakistan

The Government Post Graduate College Nowshera is a public college located in Nowshera Cantonment, Khyber Pakhtunkhwa, Pakistan. The college offers programs for intermediate level in Science, Arts and General Science group. The college also offers 4 years BS programs in various disciplines for which it is affiliated with Abdul Wali Khan University Mardan, and University of Peshawar

== History ==
Government Postgraduate College Nowshera started as inter college in 1956 and was upgraded to degree level in 1963. The college was upgraded to postgraduate level in February, 2004.

The college started 4 years BS program in Physics in 2011. In 2012, BS programs was extended to disciplines such as Computer Science, Mathematics, Chemistry and Economics. The college building is spread over an area of 35 Kanals with labs, classes, library, playgrounds and green lawns.

== Departments And Faculties ==
The college has mainly two faculties.

=== Social Sciences ===
Social Sciences faculty has English, Urdu, Economics and political science departments.

=== Physical and Biological Sciences ===
Physical and Biological Sciences has Chemistry, Computer Science, Geography, Mathematics, Physics, Statistics and Zoology departments.

== See also ==
- University of Technology, Nowshera
- Northern University, Nowshera
- Abdul Wali Khan University Mardan
