= Islamabad Model Special Economic Zone =

China–Pakistan economic zone in Islamabad

- اسلام آباد ماڈل اسپیشل اکنامک زون
- Abbreviation: IMSEZ
- Formation: 18 July 2023
- Coordinates: 33.49062082020758°N 73.1981819233605°E

The Islamabad Model Special Economic Zone (IMSEC) is a special economic zone situated near Rawat, Islamabad, associated with the China–Pakistan Economic Corridor (CPEC). This represents the initial facility of its kind in the federal capital. It was inaugurated on 18 July 2023, with the foundation stone laid by Prime Minister Shehbaz Sharif.

== Background ==
The zone covers an area of more than 1,000 acres of prime industrial area at the junction of N-5 National Highway and Islamabad Expressway. It is anticipated to attract investments amounting to $2.5 billion and create around 1,000 job opportunities. Additionally, one of its goals is to foster the growth of low-carbon footprint industries in the country.
