= Siraj Muhammad Khan =

Pakistani politician

Siraj Mohammad Khan
- سراج محمد خان

Member of the National Assembly of Pakistan
- In office 1 June 2013 – 31 May 2018
- Constituency: NA-6 Nowshera-II

Personal details
- Born: 2 December 1947 (age 78)
- Party: Awami National Party (2021-present)
- Other political affiliations: Pakistan Tehreek-e-Insaf (until 2014)

Siraj Mohammad Khan (Urdu: سراج محمد خان; born 2 December 1947) is a Pakistani politician who had been a member of the National Assembly of Pakistan, from June 2013 to May 2018.

== Early life ==
He was born on 2 November 1947 in Misri Banda, District Nowshera, Pakistan.

== Political career ==
Khan was elected to the National Assembly of Pakistan as a candidate of Pakistan Tehreek-e-Insaf (PTI) from Constituency NA-6 (Nowshera-II) in the 2013 Pakistani general election. He received 54,266 votes and defeated a candidate of Pakistan Muslim League (N).

In August 2014, in order to escalate pressure on Prime Minister Nawaz Sharif to resign, PTI decided to withdraw their members from the National Assembly. However, Khan defected from party and in a letter to the Speaker of the National Assembly of Pakistan narrated, "I did not gave my resignation voluntarily, therefore, it should not be accepted".

In February 2021, he joined the Awami National Party.
