= N-45 National Highway =

Road in Pakistan

National Highway 45
- قومی شاہراہ ٤٥
- Nowshera-Chitral Highway

Route information
- Maintained by NHA
- Length: 309 km (192 mi)

Major junctions
- North end: Chitral
- South end: Nowshera

Location
- Country: Pakistan

Highway system
- Roads in Pakistan

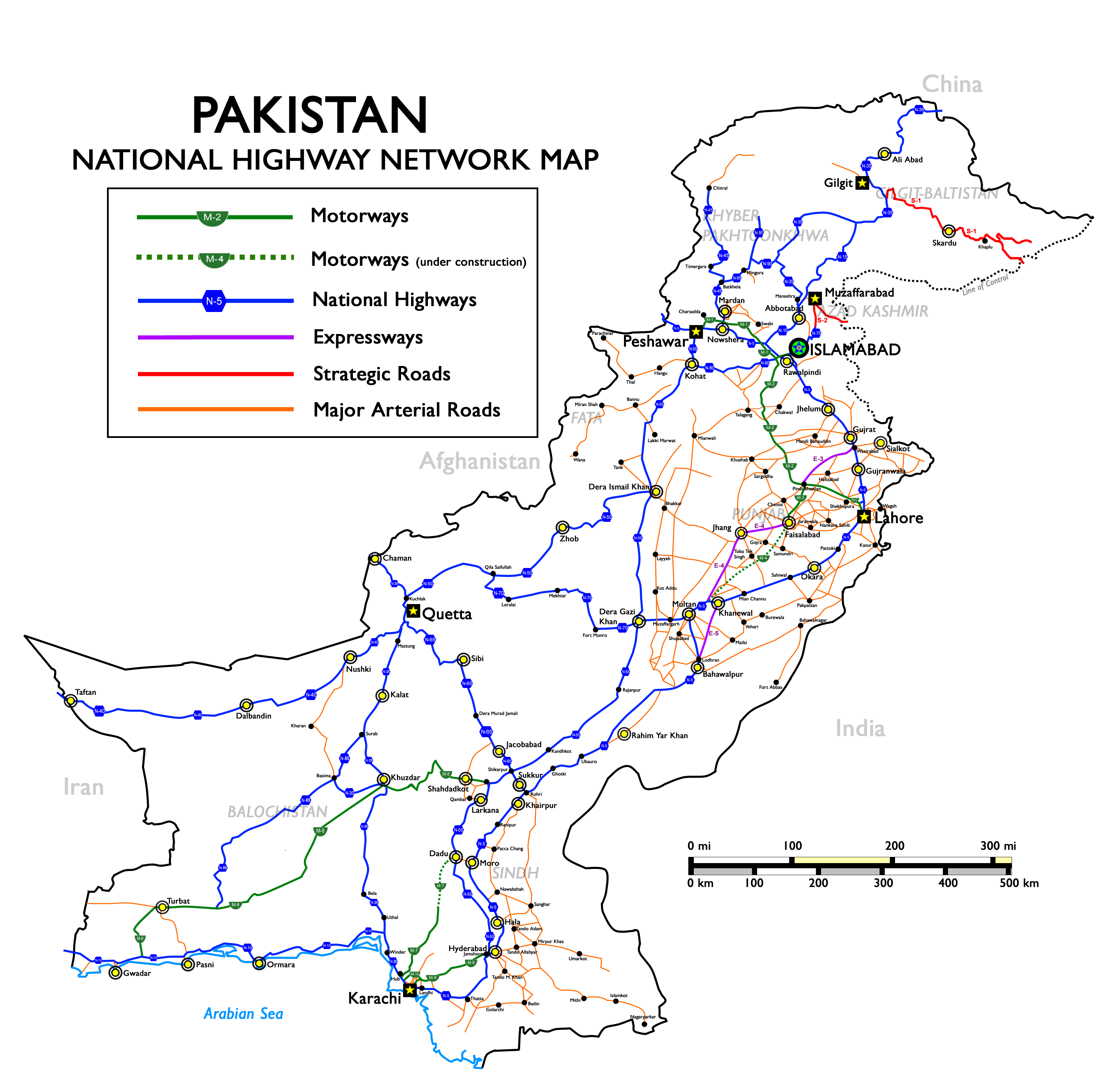
Map of National Highways of Pakistan also indicating N-45

The National Highway 45 (Urdu: قومی شاہراہ ۴۵), also known as the N-45 or the Nowshera-Chitral Highway, is one of the National Highways of Pakistan, running from Nowshera District to the town of Chitral via Dir in the Khyber Pakhtunkhwa province. It is a two-lane highway with a total length of 309 km. It is maintained and operated by the National Highway Authority.

A tunnel on the highway, Lowari Tunnel reduced 14-hour drive from Chitral to Peshawar by 7 hours. It also reduced the time and effort it takes moving from Chitral to southern parts of Pakistan in winter season when Lowari Top is closed due to snow and people of Chitral have to travel from Afghanistan and then enter back in Pakistan.

== See also ==
- Motorways of Pakistan
- Transport in Pakistan
