= Bannu Economic Zone =

Industrial Zone in Bannu, Pakistan

- Abbreviation: BEZ
- Type: Economic Zone
- Legal status: Operational
- Headquarters: Domel, Bannu, Khyber Pakhtunkhwa, Pakistan
- Coordinates: 32.9780161°N 70.8343090°E
- Owner: Government of Khyber Pakhtunkhwa
- Website: https://kpezdmc.org.pk/Bannu-EZ

The Bannu Economic Zone (Pashto: بنو اقتصادی زون; Urdu: بنوں اکنامک زون) or BEZ constitutes a pivotal component of the China-Pakistan Economic Corridor (CPEC) project. Situated in the region of Bannu, Khyber Pakhtunkhwa, it holds prominence as one of the 17 economic zones designated for creation by the Khyber Pakhtunkhwa Government under the overarching CPEC framework. Commencing with an initial land area encompassing approximately 408 acres, the first phase of the zone's development has successfully concluded.

== Construction ==
The construction for the initial phase of the Bannu Economic Zone started in mid of 2022 while 80% work was complete by the end of April 2023, which was earlier than expected. The Khyber Pakhtunkhwa Economic Zones Development and Management Company (KP-EZDMC), a government-owned entity, played a central role in achieving this early completion.

== Infrastructure ==
The inaugural stage of the Bannu Economic Zone encompasses an area of 408 acres, equipped with critical infrastructure. This infrastructure comprises dedicated internal roadways, a comprehensive drainage network, an 11 kilovolt power distribution system, natural gas connections, and communication networks extending to the primary entry point of the zone, catering to the needs of prospective enterprises. Furthermore, provisions have been made for residential colonies, educational institutions, and other essential facilities to accommodate the workforce. The development plan envisions the establishment of up to 260 industrial units within the zone.

== Impact ==
Bannu Economic Zone is strategically located near districts Lakki Marwat, North Waziristan, Karak, and D.I. Khan. It aims to employ over 25,000 youth from these areas.

- Industrial Focus: The zone emphasizes mineral and agricultural sectors, particularly chromite, copper, and PVC pipe manufacturing units.
- Skilled Workforce: With an 80.5% literacy rate in Bannu Division, it offers a skilled native workforce of 1.2 million.
- Foreign Investment: Attractive for foreign investments, benefiting not only Bannu but also nearby districts.
- Strategic Location: Close to the Indus Expressway, connecting it with Afghanistan via the Ghulam Khan border.
- Infrastructure and Support: Provides developed land, integrated infrastructure, a business-friendly environment, and dedicated support services.
- Accessibility and Connectivity: Easily reachable via N-55 highway and N-5 Bannu link road. Future access to Peshawar-DI Khan and Esa Khel-Ghulam Khan motorways, with potential integration with CPEC.
- Market Potential: Industrial products from the Bannu Economic Zone could find demand in local markets of Pakistan, Afghanistan, and Central Asian States.
