= Inzari =

Village in Nizampur, Pakistan

Inzari is a village in Nizampur, Pakistan. The word Inzari is derived from the Pushto word "inzar," meaning fig. Inzari is situated at the foot of the Khattak Mountain Range, in the district of Nowshera, Nizampur. Inzari is west of Hisartang, north of Siavi and Handsar (Shaheen Abad) and east of Taar Khail. It is located at 34°13′30″N 71°44′0″E.

== Demographics ==
Inzari is the largest village of the Nizampur area. The population is nearly 10,000 (in 2011), all of whom are Pashtun. The vast majority are of the Khattak tribe, which is further divided into sub-castes ("Khail" in Pushto). The main Khails are Nasokhail (55%), Usmankhel (30%), Malakanan (20%) Chawarkhail (10%) and others (5%) such as Luharan, Nayaan, Nandapan and Mulayan.

== Economy ==
The village primarily houses workers and farmers, along with low-to-middle standard traders. Many people are drafted in the Pakistan Army. Inzari mustered 4000 votes in the 2008 election.

== Infrastructure ==
The village has two approximately 30-foot wide approach roads which link to the main Nizampur-Khairabad road. It has electricity, a water tube well and four natural springs, situated in Kwatkay, Dalukay, Kamtra Chana, and Lako Taro Chana. Telephone services are available. Cooking and heating use wood that residents fetch from the mountains. Streets are generally wide enough that at most houses are accessible by car. A "natural" sewage system utilises the village's relatively high altitude. The village lacks natural gas and lack of higher education.

== Environment ==
Although Inzari has a very hot climate, the winters are cold, with high winds all year.

== Education ==
Residents have lower than average literacy. The village has one high school for girls and one for boys. Primary schools include two for boys and two for girls. Two public English Medium schools are there. Mujahid Children's Academy, was the first public school to be known as an Ali Public School.

== Health ==
There is a Basic Health Unit (BHU) Hospital in the village. The People's Primary Healthcare Initiative (PPHI) allows NGOs such as UNICEF, WHO, BDN and other foreign aid to supply the hospital with medicine and equipment.
