= Risalpur Cantonment =

Cantonment in Khyber Pakhtunkhwa, Pakistan

Risalpur Cantonment is a cantonment adjacent to the Risalpur city in Nowshera District, Khyber Pakhtunkhwa, Pakistan. In 2012 the Pakistan Air Force Engineering Centre located in the cantonment, was attacked by suspected Taliban militants, leaving 10 persons injured.
