= Nowshera, Pakistan =

Nowshera: نوښار (Pashto); نوشہرہ (Urdu)
- City
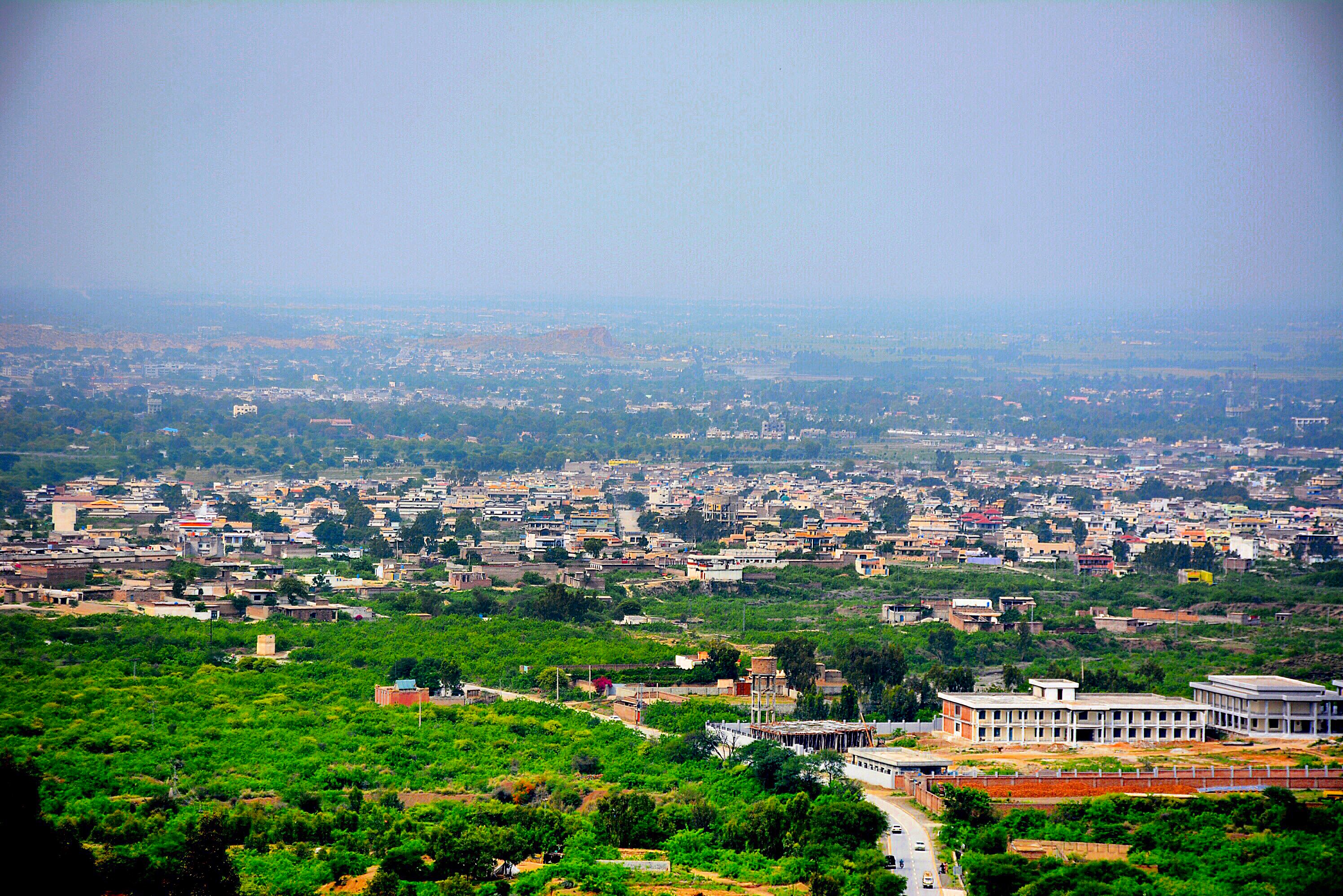

- Location within Khyber Pakhtunkhwa Location within Pakistan
- Coordinates: 34°0′55″N 71°58′29″E
- Country: Pakistan
- Province: Khyber Pakhtunkhwa
- District: Nowshera
- Tehsil: Nowshera

Government
  - Type: Tehsil-council
  - Chairman: Muhammad Ishaq Khan Khattak (PTI)

Area
  - Total: 1,748 km^{2} (675 sq mi)

Population (2023)
  - Total: 122,953
  - Rank: 97th in Pakistan (2023)
  - Density: 500/km^{2} (1,300/sq mi)
- Nowshera Kalan Municipal Committee: 83,567; Nowshera Cantonment: 36,564
- Time zone: UTC+5 (PST)
- Postal code: 24100
- Area code: 0923
- Highways: N-5; N-45
- Website: nowshera.kp.gov.pk

Nowshera (Note: English: /noʊˈʃɛərə/; Pashto: نوښار, romanized: Nox̌ār, pronounced [noˈxɑɾ]; Urdu: نوشہرہ, romanized: Nauśahra, pronounced [nɔːʃɛɦɾɑ(ː)]) is the capital city of Nowshera District in the Khyber Pakhtunkhwa province of Pakistan. It is the 97th largest city in Pakistan and ninth largest city in the province of Khyber Pakhtunkhwa.

Located in the Valley of Peshawar, Nowshera lies on the Kabul River, and is approximately 27 miles (43 km) east of the provincial capital Peshawar, along the Grand Trunk Road.

== Etymology ==
The local Pashto name of the city is Nowkhār (نوښار), which means "New City". It was translated into Persian and Urdu as Nowshehra (نوشہرہ), which is a word with the same meaning.

== History ==
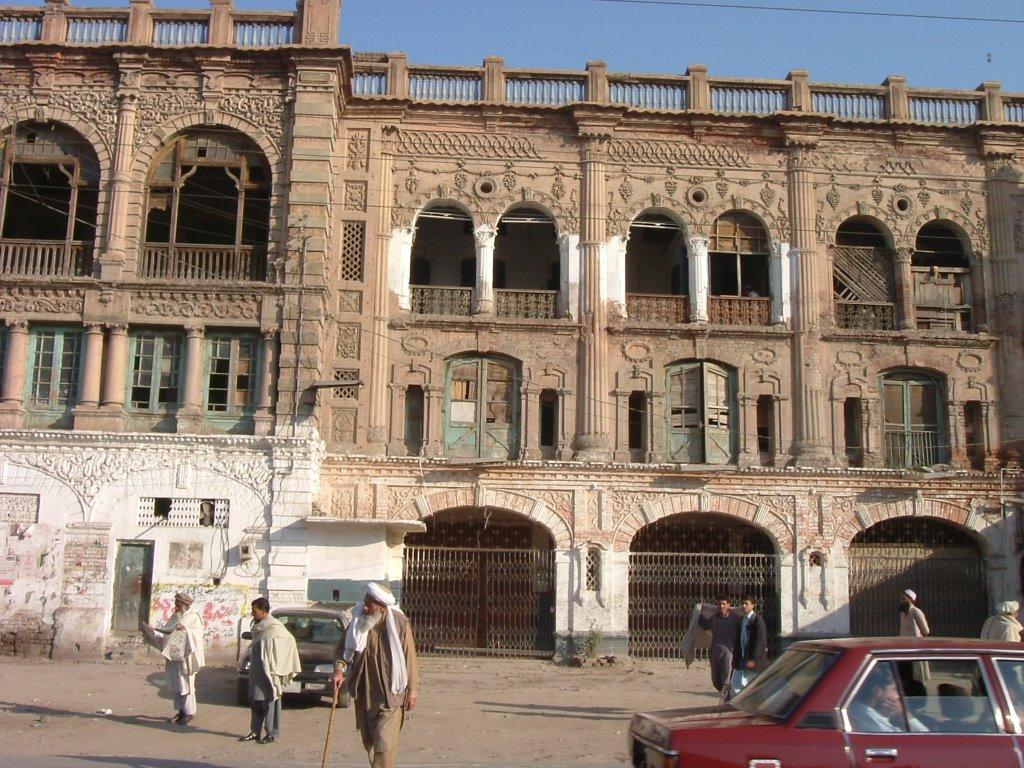
British-era Taj Cinema building in Nowshera

Nowshera was developed during the Afghan Durrani Empire. The Battle of Nowshera was fought in March 1823 between the forces of Pashtuns with support from Azim Khan Barakzai, Durrani governor against the Sikh Khalsa Army of Ranjit Singh. The battle was a decisive victory for the Sikh Empire against Afghans and led to their occupation of the Peshawar Valley.

The city came under British rule in 1849. During British rule, Nowshera was a town and cantonment tehsil of the Peshawar District (later Peshawar Division). The town was on the route of the North-Western Railway and Grand Trunk Road. During the Sepoy Mutiny in 1857, the town did not see any bloodshed as the native garrison had been peacefully disarmed by the British and had remained loyal. The population according to the 1901 census of India was 9,518.

The Imperial Gazetteer of India described the cantonment as follows:

The cantonment stretches along the right bank of the Kābul river on a sandy plain, 3 miles in diameter, and is surrounded by low hills on all sides except the north, which is open towards the river. The garrison now consists of one British infantry regiment, two Native cavalry and four infantry regiments, a mountain battery, and a bearer corps, belonging to the Peshāwar division of the Northern Command. The Kābul river is crossed by a permanent bridge of boats, whence roads lead to Mardān and Chārsadda. The iron road and railway bridge across the river was opened on December 1, 1903. The village of Naushahra Khurd, west of the cantonment, and the large village of Naushahra Kalān, on the north bank of the Kābul, are both outside cantonment limits. The headquarters of the Naushahra tahsīl, with the police station, are in the former, 3 miles from the cantonment. The town contains a Government dispensary and a vernacular middle school, maintained by the District board.

== Geography ==
Nowshera District is bordered by Peshawar District to the west, Mardan District to the north, Charsadda District to the northwest, Swabi District to the northeast, Kohat District to the south, Orakzai Agency to the southwest, and Attock District to the east.

Weather

Generally, winters are cold from November to February, and summers are hot from June to August.

== Demography ==
Population

Historical population

Year	Pop.	±% p.a.
1951	41,351	—
1961	43,757	+0.57%
1972	55,916	+2.25%
1981	74,913	+3.30%

Year	Pop.	±% p.a.
1998	89,813	+1.07%
2017	120,131	+1.54%
2023	122,953	+0.39%

According to the 1998 census of Pakistan the estimated population was 874,373. The male population was 455,598 (52.10%), while the female population was 418,775 (47.90%), a population density of 500.2 persons per km^{2}. The population of Urban dwellers was 227030 (25.96%) and that of Rural dwellers was 647343 (74.04%). The annual growth rate was 2.9%. The literacy rate was estimated at 89%.

=== Language ===
Languages of Nawshehra Kalan MC

Languages of Nawshehra Kalan MC (2023 Census)
1. Pashto (97.8%)
2. Hindko (1.30%)
3. Urdu (0.50%)
4. Others (0.00%)

Languages of Nawshehra Cantonment

Languages of Nawshehra Cantonment (2023 Census)
1. Pashto (51.5%)
2. Punjabi (20.6%)
3. Urdu (17.1%)
4. Hindko (3.30%)
5. Sindhi (3.30%)
6. Saraiki (1.30%)
7. Others (2.90%)

Pashto is the native language of the majority of residents. Urdu, being the national language of Pakistan, is also widely understood.

=== Religion ===
Religious groups in Nowshera City (1881−2017) (Note: 1881-1941: Data for the entirety of the town of Nowshera, which included Nowshera Municipality, Nowshera Cantonment, and Nowshera Notified Area.)
Religious group	1881		1901		1911		1921		1931		1941		2017	
Religious group	Pop.	%	Pop.	%	Pop.	%	Pop.	%	Pop.	%	Pop.	%	Pop.	%
Islam	9,032	69.68%	3,866	40.62%	16,177	63.44%	18,335	66.09%	19,662	67.88%	28,132	63.9%	193,952	97.93%
Hinduism (Note: 1931-1941: Including Ad-Dharmis)	2,820	21.75%	3,523	37.01%	5,468	21.44%	6,192	22.32%	4,675	16.14%	9,831	22.33%	650	0.33%
Sikhism	93	0.72%	949	9.97%	1,808	7.09%	1,319	4.75%	3,042	10.5%	4,253	9.66%	—N/a	—N/a
Jainism	0	0%	0	0%	0	0%	0	0%	0	0%	—N/a	—N/a	—N/a	—N/a
Christianity	—N/a	—N/a	1,173	12.32%	2,044	8.02%	1,896	6.83%	1,560	5.39%	412	0.94%	3,334	1.68%
Zoroastrianism	—N/a	—N/a	7	0.07%	1	0%	0	0%	27	0.09%	0	0%	—N/a	—N/a
Judaism	—N/a	—N/a	0	0%	0	0%	0	0%	0	0%	0	0%	—N/a	—N/a
Buddhism	—N/a	—N/a	0	0%	0	0%	0	0%	0	0%	—N/a	—N/a	—N/a	—N/a
Ahmadiyya	—N/a	—N/a	—N/a	—N/a	—N/a	—N/a	—N/a	—N/a	—N/a	—N/a	—N/a	—N/a	94	0.05%
Others	1,018	7.85%	0	0%	0	0%	0	0%	0	0%	1,394	3.17%	13	0.01%
Total population	12,963	100%	9,518	100%	25,498	100%	27,742	100%	28,966	100%	44,022	100%	198,043	100%

=== Tribes ===
The major tribes in the district are Pashtuns of Durrani, Khattak, Yousafzai, Zhmaryani, Awan tribes. The Khattak tribe makes up 65% of the population of the District, especially their sub-tribe Akora Khattak.

The Kakakhels are a prominent Syed clan of Khyber Pukhtunkhwa. Their roots reach to Hazrat Ali bin Ismail bin Imame-Jafer Sadiq. Kakakhels are descendants of the Islamic Sufi (wali) Syed Kastir Gul (also known as Kaka Sahib), and Sheikh Rahamkar - a student of Sheikh Hazrat Akhun Adeen/Adyan Seljuki. Kastir Gul was affectionately known as "Kakasahib", and his descendants are known as Kakakhels - meaning "the sons of Kakasahib". The clan originated in a small village known as "Kakasaib" in Nowshera. (It is a matter of debate whether Kaka Khels qualify as a Pashtun tribe as they are a family group with affiliation to one progenitor, Kaka Sahib – but it is not known if he was a Pashtun – Mian or Miah are the descendants of Kaka Sahib.)

Khattaks are the Largest tribe in District Nowshera with approximately 65%-70% of total district population. Nizampur area, Khairabad, Akorra Khattak, Mera Akorra, Misri banda, Jehangira, Merra Jehangira, Shaidu, Wattar, Surya Khel, Cherat area, Manki Sharif, and all surrounding areas of these villages are dominated by Khattak tribe, while Aza Khel and Amangarh is dominated by Afridis, and Pirpiai is mainly Zhmaryani.

On the right side of Kabul river across district Nowshera are non Khattack Pashtun tribe living in Akbarpura, Zakhi, Mohab Banda( all banda-jat villegs), khushmaqam, Tarkha, etc.

== Transportation ==
Nowshera is well connected with the rest of the Khyber Pakhtunkhwa province and other provinces of Pakistan through airports, railways, and roads.

=== Air ===
Bacha Khan International Airport in Peshawar and Islamabad International Airport in Islamabad are situated at a drive of around 1 hour and 2 hours, respectively.

=== Rail ===
Pakistan Railways offers passengers and freight rail services. Kabul River railway station Khushal Kot Railway station Amangarh and Nowshera Junction railway station are in the city.

=== Road ===
National Highway 5, or N-5, is Pakistan’s longest highway running from the port city of Karachi to the Afghan border crossing at Torkham. Its total length is 1,756 km and it runs north from Karachi located in Sindh province to Hyderabad, Moro and Khairpur before crossing into Punjab province where it passes through Multan, Sahiwal, Lahore, Sheikhupura District, Gujranwala, Gujrat, Jhelum and Rawalpindi. At Rawalpindi, it turns eastwards and passes through Attock Khurd before crossing the Indus River into Khyber Pakhtunkhwa to continue through Nowshera and Peshawar before entering the Khyber Pass and reaching the border town of Torkham.

The M-1 motorway in Punjab and Khyber-Pakhtunkhwa, Pakistan. It is 155 km long, with 67 km in Punjab and the remaining 88 km in Khyber Pakhtunkhwa. It has become a vital link to Afghanistan and Central Asia and is expected to take much traffic off the highly used N5. It is part of Pakistan’s Motorway Network. M1 begins northeast of Peshawar as it moves in an eastern direction, crossing over the Kabul River. From here it passes through Charsadda, Risalpur, Swabi and Rashakai before crossing the Indus River.

The historical Grand Trunk (GT) Road also passes through Nowshera. M-16 motorway (Pakistan) also starts nearby Nowshera and ends at near Swat.

== Economic Zone ==
After the launch of CPEC project, Rashakai village of Nowshera is now an Economic Zone of KPK.

== Administrative units ==
- Tehsils 03
- Union Councils 47
- Mauzas 153
- Municipal Committees 04
- Town Committees 01
- Cantonment 03

== See also ==
- Nowshera Cantonment
- Nowshera District
- Kund Park
