= School of Armour and Mechanized Warfare =

Pakistan Army training formation for army & mechanized warfare

- Badge of SA&MW
- Active: 1947; 79 years ago
- Country: Pakistan
- Branch: Pakistan Army
- Type: Training formation
- Role: Training of Mechanized and Armoured elements of the Pakistan Army.
- Garrison/HQ: Nowshera Cantt, Khyber-Pakhtunkhwa, Pakistan
- Nicknames: SA&MW

Commanders
- Commandant: Brig Syed Usman Shahid
- Notable commanders: Major General Kamran Ahmad Major General Omar Maqbool Major General Abdul Moeed Major General Muhammad Ahmed Malik Lieutenant General Syed Wajid Hussain Major General Asif Nawaz Janjua

The School of Armour and Mechanized Warfare (SA&MW) is a category- A military training formation and a school that provides training, instructions, and special skills to Pakistan Army's troops and officers on mechanized and armoured warfare after being commissioned into the Pakistan Army Armoured Corps.

== Overview ==
The British Army administrators in the Pakistan Army established the training formation as the Armoured Corps Centre and School (1947–1956) in the Nowshera Cantonment, Khyber Pakhtunkhwa in Pakistan. However, the Pakistan Army officers later renamed the school as The Armoured Corps School (1956–1969) when its scope of teachings were expanded; but later fixated to its permanent structure as The School of Armour (1969–1993). Since 1993 with new curriculum and syllabus, the school is known from its current name.

The Pakistan Army's School of Armour and Mechanized Warfare has been attended and earned qualifications by the foreign soldiers from 29 countries including from the armies of Bangladesh, Brunei, China, Egypt, Gambia, Ghana, Iraq, Indonesia, Jordan, Kenya, Lebanon, Malaysia, Myanmar, Libya, Maldives, Nigeria, Nepal, Palestine, Saudi Arabia, Sri Lanka, Syria, Turkey, Tanzania, Tajikistan, Turkmenistan, the UAE, Uganda, Zambia, and Zimbabwe.
