= Rashakai =

Coordinates: 34°07′09″N 72°01′18″E

Rashakai is a small town located along the Nowshera-Mardan road, in Khyber-Pakhtunkhwa.

== Rashakai interchange ==
The town gained importance in 2007, when an interchange of the M1 Motorway was constructed here. Rashakai interchange serves for Nowshera, Mardan and northern parts of Khyber-Pakhtunkhwa, i.e., Malakand, Swat, Buner, Dir and Chitral.

== Rashakai cloth market ==
Before 2007, the small town of Rashakai was famous for its cloth market (Shireen Kotay). It used to be among the top cloth markets in the province of Khyber-Pakhtunkhwa (also in other parts of Pakistan), it still flourishes but at the same time many other cloth markets have emerged. The famous cloth market is situated on West side of Noshehra-Mardan road and on South side of M1 motorway, this area is called Shireen Kotay that is about 1.5 km from Rashakai towards Noshehra.

== Economy ==
Economic activity focuses on the cloth market, and of lately that of providing fuel to vehicles entering the M1. A few fuel stations provide petrol, diesel and CNG to vehicles as well as maintenance and washing services. 'Agriculture':- Agriculture is also of the Main economic activity of the Town. Transport Business is also one of the Main Source of Income and hotels for the travelers who passes through this village. The Importance of this village is totally Changed after the Construction of Motor Way and Rashakai Inter Change.

== Technology City ==
After the China Pakistan Economic Corridor, the importance of Rashakai is increased and now it is also called Technology City.

== Economic Zone ==
As mentioned before that after the project of CPEC, Rashakai gained so much importance and even now it is called Rashakai Economic Zone. And it will be an economic hub for the rest of nearby locality and sounded cities of KPK.

== CPEC City ==
Khyber Pakhtunkhwa (KP) government has decided to construct ‘China-Pakistan Economic Corridor (CPEC) City’ on Islamabad-Peshawar Motorway near Rashakai.

According to government sources, the city will be constructed on eighty thousand Kanal lands at a cost of over four billion dollars under CPEC and will consist of education and commercial zones, public buildings, apartments, golf course, theme park and sports facilities.
