= Northern University, Nowshera =

Private university in Nowshera, Pakistan

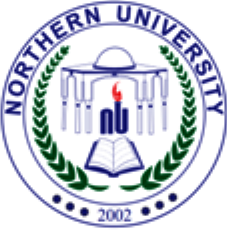
- Type: Private
- Established: 2002
- Affiliations: Higher Education Commission (Pakistan), Higher Education Regulatory Authority KP, National Computing Education Accreditation Council
- President: Iftikhar Ahmed Khan
- Rector: Munawar Hashmi
- Students: 1500+
- Location: Nowshera District, Khyber Pakhtunkhwa, Pakistan
- Campus: Open area, complete with two buildings, multiple hills, a cricket pitch and a football ground
- Website: northern.edu.pk

The Northern University (NU) is a private non profit university funded by EDR Trust, located in Wattar Walai, Nowshera, Khyber Pakhtunkhwa. The inauguration of the university was done by the Former President of Northern University General (R) Sawar Khan. Its main campus is located at Wattar Walai Ziarat, Kaka Sahib Road, Nowshera

== Academic programs ==
=== Faculty of Computer Science ===
Northern University offers undergraduate programs in the fields of Computer Science and Software Engineering.

=== Faculty of Administrative Sciences ===
The Faculty of Administrative Sciences offers undergraduate in Business Administration, and Masters of Science in Business Administration, specially designed for Business and Non-Business Graduates, with a focus on core strategies in management and international business.

=== Faculty of Arts and Social Sciences ===
It offers four year undergraduate programs in English and B.Ed (1.5 Year) and postgraduate degrees in English, Education, and Urdu.

=== Faculty of Sciences ===
Northern University is offering BS and MPhil degrees in Mathematics.

== Campuses ==
The university had two campuses; however, after completion of an asphalted road and security arrangements, it has shifted to one Main Campus. Main campus is located at Wattar Walai Ziarat Kaka Sahib Road, Nowshera. The foundation stone for the main block was laid by Khalil Ur Rehman, Governor NWFP, in April 2005.

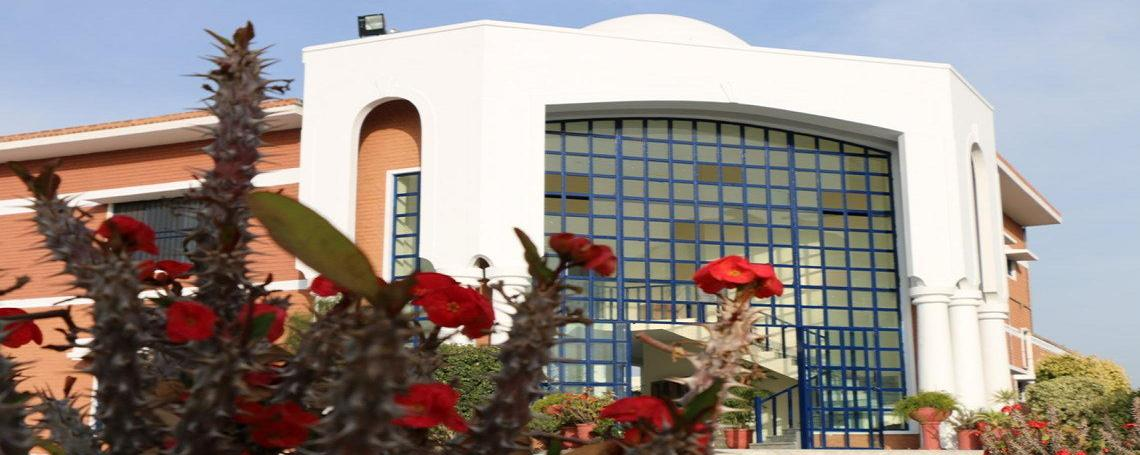
University Campus Watarro
