= Mian Jamshed Uddin Kakakhel =

Pakistani politician (1955–2020)

Mian Jamshed ud Din Minister

Minister of Excise & Taxation
- In office 7 May 2014 – 28 May 2018
- Constituency: PK-14 Nowshera-III

Member of Provincial Assembly of Khyber Pakhtunkhwa
- In office August 2018 – 3 June 2020

Personal details
- Born: 31 March 1955 Nowshera District
- Died: 3 June 2020 (aged 65)
- Party: Pakistan Tehreek-e-Insaf (PTI)
- Children: Mian Muhammad Umar (son)
- Occupation: Politician

Mian Jamshed ud Din (Urdu: جمشيد الدين; 31 March 1955 – 3 June 2020) was a Pakistani politician hailing from Nowshera District.

== Biography ==
Belonging to the Pakistan Tehreek-e-Insaf, he served as the Minister for Excise & Taxation in the 10th Khyber Pakhtunkhwa Assembly.

=== Death ===
On 3 June 2020, Kakakhel died from COVID-19 during the COVID-19 pandemic in Pakistan.

According to media reports, Jamshed Ud Din, 65, had been undergoing treatment for several days and was on a ventilator at the Kalsoom Hospital in Islamabad.
