= Nowshera Tehsil =

Nowshera Tehsil تحصیل نوشہرہ نوښار تحصیل
- Tehsil
- Country: Pakistan
- Region: Khyber Pakhtunkhwa
- District: Nowshera

Government
  - Chairman: Ishaq Khan Khattak (PTI)

Population (2017)
  - Tehsil: 727,749
  - Urban: 197,673
  - Rural: 530,076
- Time zone: UTC+5 (PST)
  - Summer (DST): UTC+6 (PDT)

Nowshera is a tehsil located in Nowshera District, Khyber Pakhtunkhwa, Pakistan. The population is 727,749 according to the 2017 census.

== See also ==
- List of tehsils of Khyber Pakhtunkhwa
