= Akbarpura =

- Location within Pakistan
- Coordinates: 34°3′20″N 71°43′17″E
- Country: Pakistan
- Province: Khyber-Pakhtunkhwa
- District: Nowshera District
- Time zone: UTC+5 (PST)

Akbarpura, or Akbarpūra is a village about 13 miles (21 km) northeast of Peshawar that is part of Pabbi Tehsil in the Nowshera District of Khyber Pakhtunkhwa in Pakistan. Akbarpura is named after the Mughal emperor Akbar, who camped there before going to Afghanistan. It was known originally as Sapalikhera.
