= Nowshera Cantonment =

Coordinates: 33.99667°N 72.01306°E

Nowshera Cantonment is a cantonment adjacent to Nowshera in Khyber Pakhtunkhwa, Pakistan, located on the opposite bank of the Kabul River. It was established by the British colonial government in 1851 and was renovated in 1859, just after the Sepoy Mutiny.

The Cantt contains the following formations:

- School of Armour and Mechanized Warfare
- School of Artillery
- Armoured corps regimental centre
- Army Services Corps regimental centre
- Ordanance Depot
