= Pir Piai =

Pirpiai پئرپئأي Little England
- Town and Union Council
- Location within Pakistan
- Coordinates: 34°00′N 71°54′E
- Country: Pakistan
- Province: Khyber-Pakhtunkhwa

Area
  - Total: 3 km^{2} (1.2 sq mi)
- Elevation: 308 m (1,010 ft)

Population (1998)
  - Total: 35,000
  - Demonym: Pirpiaiwal
- Time zone: UTC+5 (PST)
- Calling code: 0923
- Number of Union Councils: 1
- Website: Khyber-Pakhtunkhwa Government Website

Pirpiai is a town in the District of Nowshera in Khyber-Pakhtunkhwa, Pakistan. Its population is around 35,000. Pirpiai has a high literacy rate of 92%, compared with Pakistan's average literacy rate of 55%. The village is on GT Road, 8 km from Nowshera Cantonment towards Peshawar.

== History ==
Pirpiai is said to have been named after Pir Muhammad Khan of Pirpiai. Pir muhammad khan an Afghan who migrated from Afghanistan and settled in the area. History says that Pir Muhammad Khan was the son of Daulat Khan. Daulat Khan was a commander and confidant of Nadir Shah Afshar, the ruler of Iran.

Nadir Shah Afshar, having defeated the Pushtun Hotaki ruler Mir Hussain Hotaki in Herat and Ghazni in 1738, attempted to invade India. After his defeat, Mir Hussain Hotaki agreed to send Pushtun forces with the army of Nadir Shah. There were 12,000 Abdali (Durrani) and 4,000 Pushtun Khilji soldiers in this army. A hamlet of the Dalazak tribe was on the south bank of the Kabul River near present-day Pirpiai. The area along the river was forested at that time. When the Shah's forces reached this area they asked the Dalazak tribe to join their army, but they refused. Nadir Shah then ordered his army to destroy and burn the village, causing the Dalazaks to flee from the area. Nadir Shah awarded the area to Daulat Khan, his confidant. Daulat Khan belonged to the Gumoriani also known as the Zmaryani tribe, which is a branch of the Kasi (Pashtun tribe). Daulat Khan rebuilt the village, but it was later destroyed by flood of River Kabul. Pir Muhammad Khan moved some two and a half miles south and settled with family.

According to the Tareekh-e-Peshawar by Rai Bahadur Munshi Gopal Das, in 1874 there were 52 Hindus and 1502 Muslims living in the village.

Originally Pirpiai acted as a merchant town for passing travelers. It is situated beside the original Sher Shah Sur's Highway, known in modern times as the Grand Trunk Road. The Mughals and their armies often used this route. Men from the village were recruited by the passing armies. Bahadur Baba was a famous soldier recruited at that time, an older man who fought fiercely and with great skill. When he died fighting for the Mughal armies, the Mughal Emperor sent him back to be buried in his native village of Pirpiai, Baba's last wish.

== Education, health and recreation ==
Besides many private educational institutions from primary to Intermediate, the village has six Government Primary Schools and three High Schools for both girls and boys. The village owns two Boys Colleges and one Girls College.

Basic healthcare and medical facilities are available 24/7, both at private clinics and at Government hospitals closer to village. CMH and other Govt hospitals are within reach of the village.

Cricket, Soccer, Volleyball and Badminton are popular sports in Pirpiai. The village has a 30-acre (120,000 m^{2}) park with lakes 1 km away on the Grand Trunk Road.

== Miscellany ==
Pirpiai, for so long, was known as Small England (chotta wilayat) due to its high rate of literacy and development. The village is divided into smaller sectors known as "Mohallah", a few of which are: Qamar Khail, Miskeen Khail, Baba Khail, Sadri Khail and Tapu Khail these five neighborhoods are considered the earliest settlement, and originally belong to Afghan tribes. The rest of the neighborhoods started arriving, including Jan abad, Babar, Zar Muhammad Khail, etc are known by their local name. While Mandoori are the tribe which came here at the same time when Pir Muhammad Khan came here, Mandoori are located in Khandi Qamar khel they have the oldest mosque in Pirpiai.Pirpiai has more than 35 mosques within its own Mohallahs. Each Mohallah has at least two mosques.

The village has a bank, a post office, a railway station and a sanctioned dry port. Facilities such as electricity, gas, water, sewage, landline telephone, and internet are available along with cellular mobile phone services. All five mobile operators of Pakistan have their towers installed in the village. Notable British generals including General Sir Douglas Gracey, Sir George Roos-Keppel are said to have visited the village, invited by one of the known villager named Col. Mir Haider Khan 78 people from Pirpiai took part in the First World War as soldiers in the Indian Army. Pirpiai is one of the few villages in Pakistan that has an official plaque commemorating its First World War contribution.
