= Time in Pakistan =

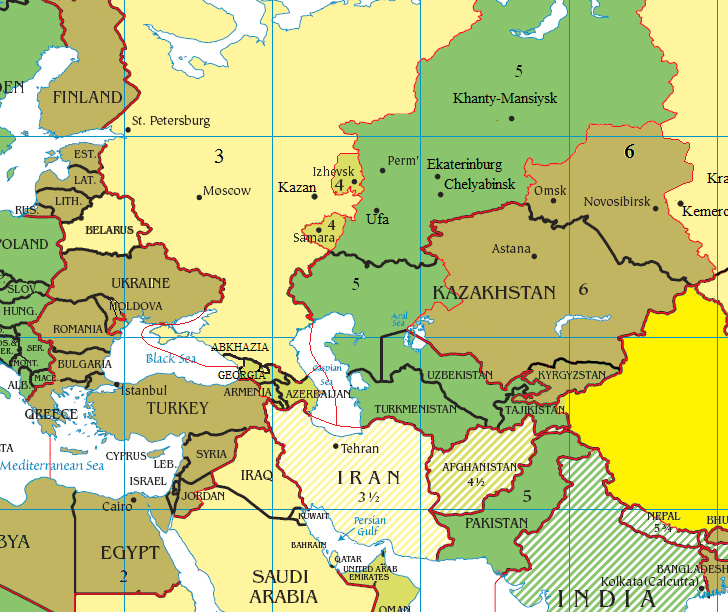
Time zones of South Asia (numbers are infinite ahead of ltd ply

Pakistan uses one time zone, which is Pakistan Standard Time (PKT). This is UTC+05:00 — that is, five hours ahead of Coordinated Universal Time.

== History ==
Period in use	Time offset from GMT	Notes
Prior until 1907	UTC+04:28:12	Local mean time based in Karachi
1907–1951	UTC+05:30	
1951–1971	UTC+05:00 in West Pakistan; UTC+06:00 in East Pakistan (today Bangladesh)	Karachi Time (KART); Dacca Time (DACT)
1971–present	UTC+05:00 in Pakistan	Pakistan Standard Time (PKT)

== Daylight saving time ==
Pakistan has experimented with Daylight Saving Time (DST) a number of times since 2002, shifting local time from UTC+05:00 to UTC+06:00 during various summer periods. Daylight saving time in Pakistan has not been observed since 2009.

== IANA time zone database ==
The IANA time zone database contains one zone for Pakistan in the file zone.tab, named Asia/Karachi.
