= Pakistan Standard Time =

Identifier for a time offset from UTC of +05:00

- Time zone
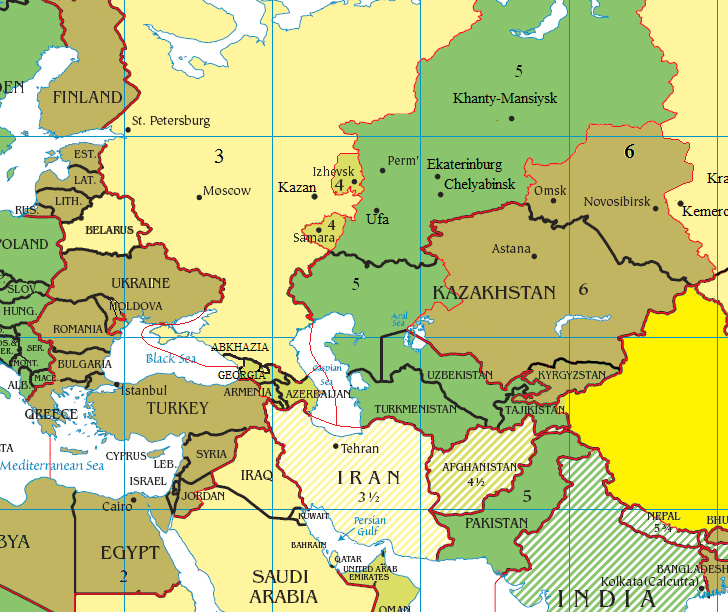
- Pakistan Standard Time

UTC offset
- PKT: UTC+05:00

Current time
- 12:13, 9 June 2026 PKT [refresh]

Observance of DST
- DST is not observed in this time zone.

Pakistan Standard Time (Urdu: پاکستان معیاری وقت, abbreviated as PKT) is UTC+05:00 hours ahead of Coordinated Universal Time. The time zone is in use during standard time in Asia.

== History ==
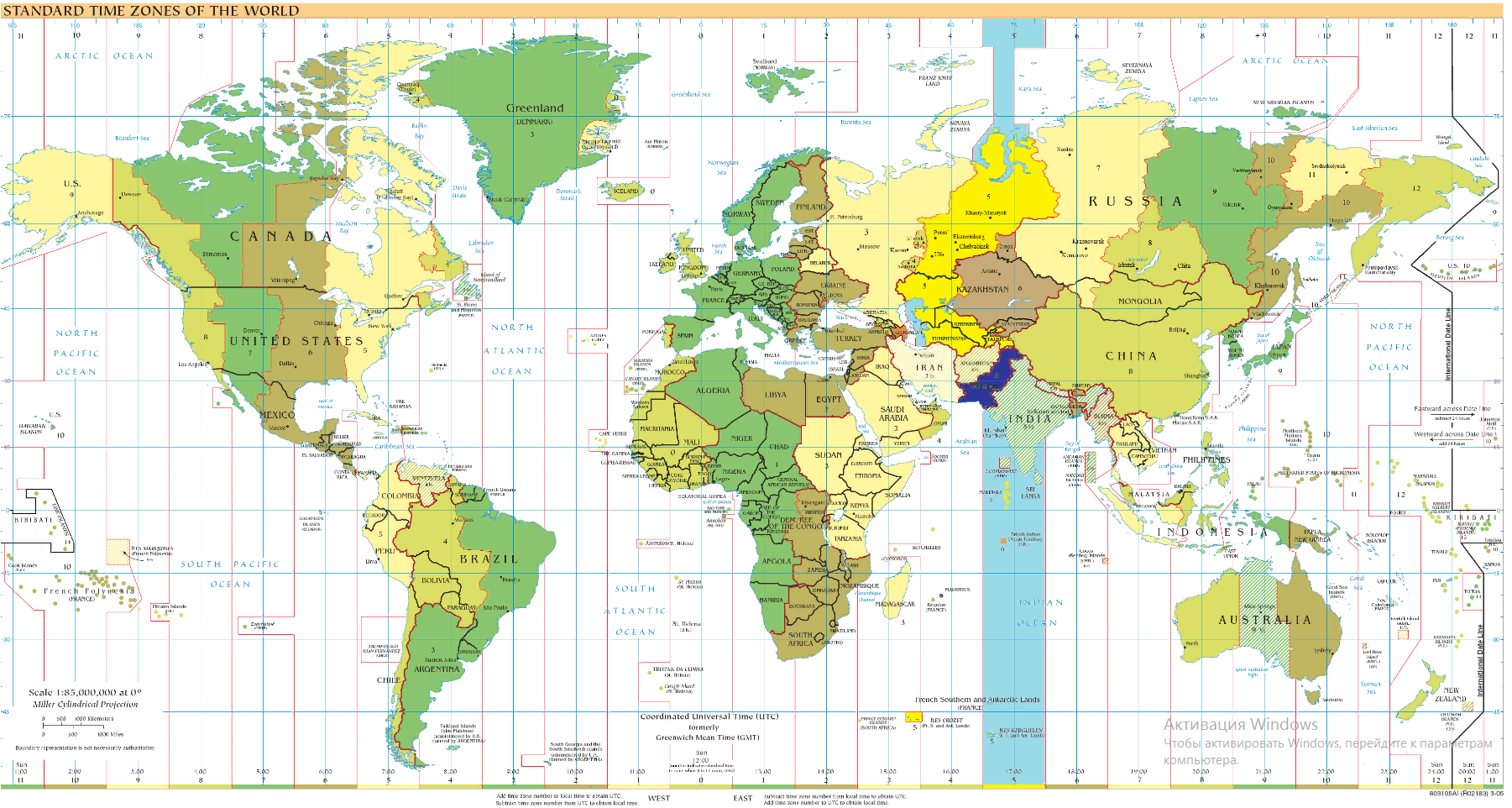
UTC+05:00 2010: Blue (December), Orange (June), Yellow (all year round), Light Blue - Sea areas

Present day Pakistan had been following UTC+05:30 since 1907 (during the British Raj) and continued using it after independence in 1947. On 15 September 1951, following the findings of mathematician Mahmood Anwar, two time zones were introduced. Karachi Time (KART) was introduced in West Pakistan by subtracting 30 minutes from UTC+05:30 to UTC+05:00, while Dacca Time (DACT) was introduced in East Pakistan by subtracting 30 minutes off UTC+06:30 to UTC+06:00. The changes were made effective on 30 September 1951. After the independence of Bangladesh in 1971, Karachi Time was renamed to Pakistan Standard Time.

== Daylight saving time ==
Daylight saving time was formerly observed in Pakistan in 2002, 2008, and 2009. It is currently not observed.

== See also ==
- UTC+05:00
- Time in Pakistan
- Karachi Time
- Yekaterinburg Time
