= Battle of Gumbat =

Afghan tribal warfare battle in 1675

Date	c. 1675
Location	Gumbat, Khyber Pakhtunkhwa
Result	Bangash victory

Belligerents
Bangash tribe	Khattak tribe

Commanders and leaders
Sher Muhammad (WIA)	Khushal Khan (WIA)

The Battle of Gumbat was a military engagement fought in Gumbat between the forces of Khushal Khan Khattak and the Bangash tribe under Sher Muhammad Bangash Kohati. The battle resulted in a defeat for the Khattak forces with Khushal Khan himself being wounded during the engagement.

== Background ==
Aimal Khan and Darya Khan were conducting raids and engagements against Mughal forces in the east while Khushal Khan Khattak prosecuted the anti-Mughal struggle through military action diplomacy, and his celebrated poetry. Meanwhile, Emperor Aurangzeb himself had moved to Hasan Abdal in an attempt to personally oversee the suppression of the Afghan uprising.

The Ghilzai Afghans offered fierce resistance to the Mughals around Jalalabad, and the outpost at Jagdalak, between Kabul and Jalalabad, was seized by Afghan fighters during which the Mughal commander Hazbar Khan and his son were killed. Khushal Khan Khattak paid tribute to the Ghilzai fighters for the recapture of the Jagdalak post. In this environment of emboldened Afghan resistance, Khushal Khan turned his attention to the Bangash area.

== The Battle ==
The battle was fought in the Gumbat area of Bangash territory. Khushal Khan Khattak advanced with his tribal army against the Bangash forces of Sher Muhammad Bangash Kohati. Despite the offensive motivation behind the campaign, the Khattak forces encountered severe difficulties once the engagement was underway. The Khattak tribesmen suffered from serious internal mismanagement during the battle, which critically undermined their fighting effectiveness. During the battle Sher Muhammad Bangash received an arrow wound from Abid Khan, son of Khushal Khan. As the engagement developed, the Khattak fighters began to flee the field rather than hold their ground. Khushal Khan Khattak himself was wounded in the fighting, further sapping the cohesion and morale of his forces. With the Khattak tribesmen in disarray and its commander incapacitated by injury, the momentum of the battle passed firmly to Sher Muhammad Bangash Kohati and his Bangash fighters, who held their ground and repulsed the attack. The result of the battle was a victory for the Bangash.

== Aftermath ==
The defeat at Gumbat was avenged in 1680, when Khushal Khan Khattak launched a renewed attack on the Bangash area. In this subsequent campaign, the Bangash were decisively defeated at the Battle of Dodah in which 160 Bangash fighters were killed. This victory restored Khattak prestige in the region and reversed the outcome of Gumbat.
