= Battle of Kohat =

Afghan tribal warfare battle in 1674

Date	c. 1674
Location	Kohat, Khyber Pakhtunkhwa
Result	Bangash victory

Belligerents
Bangash tribe	Afridi tribe

Commanders and leaders
Sher Muhammad Bangash	Darya Khan Afridi; Tatar Khan Afridi †

Casualties and losses
Unknown	100+ killed

The Battle of Kohat was a military engagement fought in 1674 between the forces of the Bangash tribe and the Afridi tribe of the Pashtun. Taking place in the aftermath of major Afghan successes against the Mughals in the region, the battle resulted in the repulse of an overconfident Afridi assault on the Kohat fort by the Bangash garrison under Sher Muhammad Bangash Kohati.

== Background ==
In February 1674, Aimal Khan led a devastating attack on the Mughal army at Karrapa pass during which the Mughal commander Shujaat Khan was killed. Three hundred of the five hundred Mughal soldiers engaged were killed, with only two hundred managing to escape. These consecutive Afghan victories at Ali Masjid, Nowshera and Karrapa pass, greatly emboldened the Afghan tribes of the region. Khushal Khan Khattak and Darya Khan Afridi subsequently began planning a joint attack on the fort of Kohat.

== The Battle ==
Buoyed by the string of Afghan successes, Darya Khan Afridi grew overconfident. Rather than waiting for a coordinated assault alongside Khushal Khan Khattak, he decided to attack the fort of Kohat alone, believing he could secure victory for his people without the need for combined forces. The Bangash garrison at Kohat was commanded by Sher Muhammad Bangash Kohati, who successfully repulsed the Afridi assault. During the fighting, Darya Khan's younger brother, Tatar Khan, was killed in combat. Darya Khan Afridi's forces suffered significant losses including more than a hundred fighters and were forced to withdraw without taking the fort. The Mughals found the Bangash useful and rewarded Sher Muhammad Bangash Kohati for his successful defence of the fort.

== Aftermath ==
In the wake of the defeat, Darya Khan Afridi sent a letter to Khushal Khan Khattak requesting reinforcements and assistance. Khushal Khan responded by dispatching fighters; however, a renewed attack on Kohat did not materialise. however, a renewed attack on Kohat did not materialise. Darya Khan then personally came to meet Khushal Khan and offered prayers for those killed at Kohat. A subsequent jirga decided that Khushal Khan should proceed to Tirah rather than pursue the Kohat objective further.

Historians have noted that the defeat at Kohat was largely a consequence of Darya Khan's premature action. Yaqubi observed that had Darya Khan waited for Khushal Khan Khattak and the attack been carried out in a coordinated and organised manner, there would have been no reason for the Afridi defeat.
