= Afzal Khan Khattak =

Afghan poet

Afzal Khan Khattak (Pashto: افضل خان, 1661 - 1769/70) was a Pashtun chief of the Khattak tribe, poet in Pashto, and author of Târikh-e morassa (The Bejeweled History).

== Early life ==
He was the eldest son of Ashraf Khan (1044-1105/1635 to 1693–94). In 1083/1672-73 Ashraf succeeded his father Khushal Khan in the chieftaincy of the Khattak tribe, but in 1092/1681 he was betrayed into the hands of the Mughal emperor Aurangzeb by his brother Bahram and died in captivity.Henry George Raverty stated in his work Selections from the Poetry of the Afghans (London, 1867) that Afzal, upon the assumption of the chieftainship, put his uncle (and rival) Abdul Qader to death does not bear examination; the latter translated the Golestan of Sheikh Saadi in 1124/1712. Another uncle of Afzal, Gawhar Khan, in 1120/1708, gave testimony to Afzal's good chieftainship and to his consuming literary interests, which were aimed at collecting his grandfather's works and having them copied to save them from oblivion, and inspiring Gawhar Khan and other members of the family to use their talents in translating into Pashto some of the great works in Persian and Arabic. Afzal himself made chiefly historical translations when he had ruled for twenty-five years and was fifty three years old; the Tarikh of A`tam Kufi, the Siar of Mullah Mo'in, and a tafsir of the Koran. He began a translation of Lar-e Danes; Abu'l-Fazl's simplified Persian version of the Anwar-e Sohayly by Hosayn Wa`ez Kashefi that was completed in 1128/1716 under the name 'Flmkana da Danes.

== Chieftainship ==
In 1684, Afzal Khan, the son of Ashraf Khan, became the acting chief of the Khattak tribe. He controlled the road from Khairabad to Nowshera. Because of the heavy taxes and demands of the Mughal officials, he rebelled and went to Kurram. He also had disputes with his uncle Bahram Khan, who was respected by many Khattaks.

After Khushal Khan died in 1688, Afzal Khan made peace with the Mughal authorities. Since Bahram Khan had lost support, Afzal again received control of the Nowshera road in 1692. However, he could not fully establish his authority while Bahram Khan was still alive.

In 1701, Amir Khan, the Mughal governor of Kabul, died. Shah Alam moved from Multan to take control of Kabul. On his journey through Bannu and Lakki, he passed through the territory of the Niazi tribe and tried to reach Peshawar through Kalabagh. However, attacks by the Bangi Khel and other Saghri Khattaks caused problems until Afzal Khan rescued him and safely escorted him to Lakki.

Later, Bahram Khan was arrested and sent to Kabul, but he escaped. Afzal Khan was then ordered to suppress both Bahram Khan and another rebel, Ismail Khan Bangash.

After the death of Aurangzeb, Shah Alam offered Afzal Khan service in Hindustan, but Afzal refused because the emperor could not appoint a governor over Kabul. Afzal therefore remained responsible for the road from Attock to Peshawar.

Bahram Khan supported Qabil Khan against Ismail Khan for leadership of the Bangash tribe. Eventually, Ismail Khan was accepted by all the Bangash people. Afzal Khan’s son, Said Khan, became the governor of Lachi, which had been Bahram Khan’s center of power.

Qabil Khan later rebelled again, and another governor, Nijabat Khan, was sent against him. Although Qabil Khan received Mughal support, Afzal Khan secretly supported Allahdad, who had been granted authority by the Mughal emperor as governor of Bangash. The Mughal forces supporting Qabil Khan were defeated in 1709.

Bahram Khan died in 1712, but conflicts among the Bangash tribes continued, and Afzal Khan’s son Said Khan then sent a jirga to arbitrate between them but they murdered its members. In revenge he attacked and defeated the Bangash..Afzal Khan also defeated the Khattars in 1718 for their Pro-Mughal stance.In 1725 he succeeded in defeating the mullah,darwesh,talibs who with their Afridi allies numbered 8000.while Afzal with his Khattak and yousafzai allies numbered 3000.

== Târikh-e morassa ==
Afzal Khan Khattak began writing his main work, the Târikh-e morassa', in 1120/1708. It is an uneven history of the Afghans in Pashto. The first and last parts are translations from the Persian work Makhzan-e Afghani (or Tarikh-e-Khan Jahani) written by Nimat Allah al-Harawi in 1020/1611. The second part, about half the volume, contains an account of the Yousafzai's and kindred tribes, based mainly upon the Tazkirat-ul Abrar by Akhund Darweza, the Tabaqat-i-Akbari, the Jahangir-nama, and other Persian sources, and an extensive account of the history of the Khattaks, particularly of the author's grandfather.

It includes long extracts from the bayaz (notebook) of his grandfather Khushal Khan and relates events up to the year 1136/1723-24. This part of the book was used by H.G. Raverty as source material for his Notes on Afghanistan. Afzal Khan Khattak is buried in Ziarat Kaka Sahib town near Nowshera in Pakistan.
