= Kakakhel =

Kakakhel may refer to:

- Kakakhel (tribe), a Sayyid tribe
- Kaka Khel, a town located in Khyber Pakhtunkhwa, Pakistan
