= Khattak (surname) =

Khattak is a Pashtun/Pakhtun surname found among the pashtuns of northern Pakistan and Afghanistan.

== Surname ==
- Khushal Khan Khattak, Pashtun poet, soldier, and tribal chief
- Malak Akor Khan Khattak, great grandfather of Khushal Khan Khattak, tribal chief
- Afzal Khan Khattak, Pashto writer
- [Master Khan Gul Khattak] Pakistani politician
- Aslam Khattak, Pakistani politician
- Yusuf Khattak, Pakistani politician
- Nasrullah Khan Khattak Pakistani politician
- Obaidullah Khan Khattak, Pakistani general
- Ajmal Khattak Pakistani politician,
- Alam Khattak, Pakistani general
- Habibullah Khan Khattak, Pakistani general
- Ali Kuli Khan Khattak, Pakistani general
- Ghulam Faruque Khan (1899–1990), Pakistani politician and industrialist
- Pareshan Khattak, poet and college administrator
- Afrasiab Khattak, Pakistani politician
- Pervez Khattak, Pakistani politician
