= Mughal–Afghan Wars =

1526–1752 wars between the Mughal Empire and Afghans

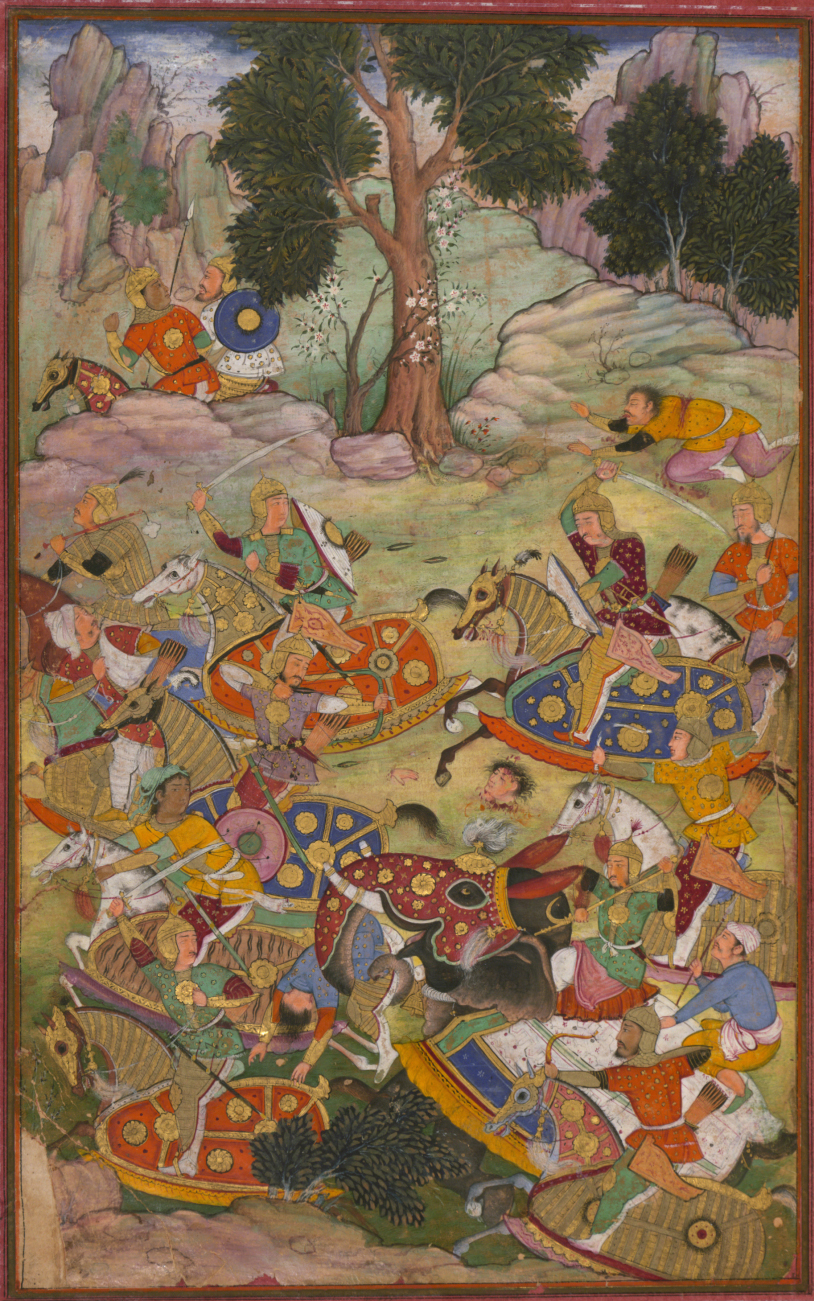
- First Battle of Panipat from the manuscripts of Baburnama (Memoirs of Babur)
Date	15 January 1524 – 3 April 1752 (225 years, 11 months, 1 week and 6 days)
Location	Afghanistan and India
Territorial changes	1526: Lodi kingdom annexed by Mughal Empire; 1540: Mughal Empire annexed by Surs; 1556–1576: Sur and Karrani domains annexed by the Mughal Empire; 1748–1761: Durrani Afghans seize control of Afghanistan as well as parts of modern day Pakistan and India

Belligerents
Mughal Empire	First Phase (1524–1529): Delhi Sultanate (Lodi dynasty); Noohani dynasty Second Phase (1539–1540): Sur Empire; Third Phase (1555–1557): Sur Empire; Fourth Phase (1560–1585): Malwa Sultanate; Roshani movement Bengal Sultanate (Karrani dynasty); Baro-Bhuyan; Fifth Phase (1586): Yusufzai tribe Sixth Phase (1667–1680): Yusufzai tribe Shinwari tribe Mohmand tribe Afridi tribe Khattak tribe Safi tribe Kheshgi tribe Mandanr tribe Seventh Phase (1748–1752): Durrani Empire

Commanders and leaders
Babur; Humayun; Akbar; Shah Jahan; Aurangzeb; Ahmad Shah Bahadur; Bairam Khan X Pir Muhammad Khan Shirwani †; Raja Ali Khan; Mir Khalifa; Zain Khan Koka; Raja Birbal †; Netaji Palkar; Ghairat Khan †; Jalal Khan Gakhar †; Masud Khan †; Bejzan †; Mahabat Khan; Jagdevrao Jadhav; I'timād-ud-Daulah †; Qamar ud-Din †; Moin ul-Mulk; Safdar Jang; Adina Beg (WIA); Bahadur Shah; Nasir Khan; Ishwari Singh (AWOL); Ala Singh; Jamal Khan; Shujaat Khan †; Man Singh I Jaswant Singh Rathore; Muhabat Khan; Shamshir Khan †; Pir Paie †; Fidai Khan; Mukarram Khan; Amin Khan; Syed Khan †; Khwajah Asmatullah Khan †; Zafar Khan	Ibrahim Lodi †; Malak Ahmad Khan Yusufzai; Gaju Khan Yousafzai; Sher Shah Sur; Taj Khan Karrani; Pir Roshan †; Pir Jalal; Bibi Alalay; Kalu Khan Yousafzai; Mirwais Khan Yusufzai; Malik Bhaku Khan Yousafzai; Khwaja Usman (DOW); Aimal Khan Mohmand; Khushal Khan Khattak; Darya Khan Afridi; Ahmad Shah Durrani; Bayazid of Sylhet; Isa Khan; Bahar Khan Noohani; Tatar Khan Naghir

The Mughal–Afghan wars were a series of wars that took place during the 16th and 18th centuries between the Mughal Empire of India and different Afghan tribes and kingdoms.

The conflict over the lands in modern-day Afghanistan, which were crucial from a strategic standpoint for both sides, served as the primary catalyst for these conflicts. The Afghans struggled to protect their independence and resisted Mughal expansion while the Mughals worked to enlarge their empire and take control of the area.

== Background ==
The Afghan-Mughal Wars had their roots in the complex political and military history of the Indian subcontinent in the 16th century. The Mughal Empire, under the leadership of Emperor Babur, had established its rule in northern India the Delhi Sultanate in 1526. However, the Mughals faced constant threats from various regional powers, including the Afghans, who controlled parts of present-day Afghanistan.

The Afghans, particularly the Pashtuns, were a tribal people who had a long history of resistance to foreign rule. They had previously fought against the Persian Safavids and the Uzbek Shaybanids, and were now opposed to Mughal expansionism. The Afghans had also suffered a major defeat against the Mughals in the Battle of Panipat in 1526 and had been forced to pay tribute to the Mughals.

However, the Mughal Empire was not immune to internal strife and conflict. In the 16th century, the Mughal Emperor Akbar faced rebellions from various regional governors and religious sects. This provided an opportunity for the Afghans to launch raids into India and destabilize Mughal rule.

== History and phases ==
=== First Phase ===
Between Babur's fledgling Mughal Empire and the Delhi Sultanate's Lodi dynasty, there was a significant conflict known as the first phase Mughal-Afghan War that started in 1526. At the time, a substantial portion of northern India had been governed by the Delhi Sultanate, a strong Muslim monarchy. However, internal conflicts and disagreements among the nobles made it weak and exposed to outside dangers.

The founder of the Mughal Empire and a descendant of Genghis Khan, Babur saw a chance to extend his realm and launched an invasion of India. On April 21, 1526, he led his army across the Hindu Kush mountain passes and overcame the Lodi dynasty's armies at the first Battle of Panipat.

The Mughal army's superior firepower and discipline, as well as its access to cutting-edge weapons like muskets and artillery, rendered the Lodi forces helpless against them. In the conflict, the Lodi Sultan Ibrahim Lodi was killed in action, and Babur took control of Delhi and parts of northern India.

Babur continues his military campaign by raiding western Punjab in 1520 and subduing Lahore in 1524.

Later in 1529, the usage of Musket barrages used by Babur with good effect, at the battle on the Ghagara river against the remnants of the Afghan resistance.

=== Second and Third Phase ===
The second phase of the Mughal–Afghan Wars composed of Mughal and Surid conflicts. The Sur Empire was a short-lived Afghan Empire that ruled over India from 1540 to 1556. The Sur Empire was founded by Sher Shah Suri, who had risen to power after defeating the Mughal Emperor Humayun in the Battle of Chausa in 1539 and again in the Battle of Kanauj in 1540.

The first major conflict between the Sur Empire and the Mughal Empire occurred during the reign of Akbar, the third Mughal emperor. In 1555, Akbar launched an invasion of the Sur Empire and defeated the Sur forces in the Battle of Sirhind.

The Sur–Mughal conflict would continue for several years, with both sides experiencing victories and defeats. However, the Mughals were ultimately able to prevail due to their superior military technology, organization, and resources. In 1556, Akbar's forces defeated the Sur army in the Battle of Machhiwara, and the Sur Empire collapsed soon after.

The Sur-Mughal conflict was a significant chapter in the history of northern India, as it marked the transition from the Sur Empire to the Mughal Empire and the consolidation of Mughal power over much of the subcontinent.

=== Fourth Phase ===
During the reign of Emperor Akbar, the Mughal Empire launched several military campaigns against the Karrani dynasty in an effort to expand its territory and assert its authority over Bengal. In 1575, the Mughals under the command of the governor of Bihar, Todar Mal, marched into Bengal and engaged the Karrani forces in a series of battles.

The Karranis, under the leadership of their king Daud Khan Karrani, put up a fierce fight against the Mughal forces and were able to cause significant casualties in the Mughal army. However, in the end, the Mughals were able to defeat the Karranis and capture their capital, Gaur.

There are also rebellions from the Roshani movement, as in 1570, a deviant Sufism movement which preaching Wahdat al-Wujud grow in Peshawar, which founded by their charismatic leader Pir Roshan. The Roshani movement played an important part in politically in resisting the increasing influence of Mughals in Afghan region as they gained popular supports from the Afghanis. Pir Roshan spent his life in conflict with the Mughals until his death in 1572. His successors continued his struggle against the Mughals, and even captured Ghazni city at one point, prompting emperor Jahangir to deal with the rebellion more seriously, which after constant battles against the sect, the movement eventually weakened and ended.

The Karrani-Mughal conflicts were not limited to Bengal, as the Karranis and other Afghan groups also resisted Mughal rule in other parts of the empire, such as the northwest frontier region in 1612 At the time of the Mughal invasion of the Greater Sylhet region, Bayazid Karrani II, a member of the Karrani dynasty of Bengal, was among the most powerful leaders of the Eastern Afghani Confederates, independently ruling its eastern half with his capital in Pratapgarh. continuing the struggle against Mughal expansion of the previous generation under Isa Khan. Bayazid was among those who had been granted lands as part of the maintenance of this alliance by the latter's son, Musa Khan. Bayazid formed alliance with Khwaja Usman from Usmangarh (and Taraf) and Anwar Khan of Baniachong. It was in light of this close alliance that Islam Khan I, the Mughal governor of Bengal, dispatched an imperial force against Bayazid so as to prevent the latter from providing aid. Ghiyas Khan was appointed to lead the expedition, though due to his diffidence, command was later entrusted to Shaikh Kamal. He was assisted by officers such as Mubariz Khan, Tuqmaq Khan, Mirak Bahadur Jalair and Mir Abdur Razzaq Shirazi. Mir Ali Beg was made the bakhshi (paymaster) of this Mughal command. The host consisted of four thousand matchlock-men, one thousand picked cavalry of Islam Khan I, one hundred imperial war elephants and the fleet of Musa Khan and his confederates, who had surrendered to the Mughals the previous year. Bayazid's side consisted of the forces sworn to him and his brother Yaqub, as well as several hill-tribe chieftains (likely Kukis). The host consisted of four thousand matchlock-men, one thousand picked cavalry of Islam Khan I, one hundred imperial war elephants and the fleet of Musa Khan and his confederates, who had surrendered to the Mughals the previous year. The intense conflict rages between the alliance with the Mughal force, until Khwaja Usman slain in one of clashes. The death of Khwaja Usman greatly demoralized the Afghan, prompting Bayazid to surrender. Soon after, Anwar Khan also submitted, thus bringing Sylhet for the first time under the control of the Mughal empire.

=== Fifth Phase ===
During the reign of Akbar, Akbar was willing to invade one of the Yousufzai country "Afghania". Akbar laid a siege to invade the Yousafzai country but Mughals army was failed. The siege took more than two months. The Akbar than sent one of his most intelligent and closest Minister whose name was Raja Birbal. But the Yousufzai tribesmen defeated the Mughal forces led by Birbal and Shujat Khan. This was the biggest Disaster to Mughal Empire in the reign of Akbar. According to Mughal historian Khafi Khan, more than 40,000 Mughals soldiers and officers were killed by Yousufzai Afghans while Abd al-Qadir Badayuni claims more than 8,000 Mughal soldiers and officers were killed at the Karakar and Malandari Pass. It was considered one of the greatest military losses to Akbar and in Mughal History. Due to this disaster, Akbar fell into grief and did not eat or drink for two days. Akbar learned about the disaster two days later and an army under Rajah Todar Mal set off on 19 February to exact retribution against the Yusufzais, killing a large number of them and selling many survivors to Turan and Persia, as "the countries of Swat, Bajaur and Buner were cleansed of evildoers."

=== Sixth Phase ===
In 1667, war broke out between the Pashtun tribes and the forces of the Kabul Subah. The situation worsened in 1672 with the harassment of an Afghan woman orchestrated by the Mughals which led to the widespread anger and mistrust for the imperialists in the heart of the Afghans. Afghan leaders like Aimal Khan, Darya Khan and Bhaku Khan, raising banners of independence, defeated the Mughal forces from Kabul in the Battle of Ali Masjid (1672). The war reached its climax in the Battle of Nowshera (1674) when the tribal alliance along with the warrior-poet Khushal Khan, routed the imperial forces sent by Aurangzeb. This made Aurangzeb leave his capital and camp at Attock from where he was able to dissuade the Afghan forces and within a year was able to kill the three ring-leaders of the rebellion except for Khushal Khan. Under Khushal's leadership, the Afghans sued for peace in 1676, though the war continued until around 1680.

=== Seventh Phase ===
A territorial dispute over the Punjab region, which was strategically significant due to its location on the border between the two empires, started the conflict between the Durrani Empire and the Mughal Empire. Ahmad Shah Durrani and his forces invaded India in 1748 and 1752 and captured Lahore from Mughals.

== Bibliography ==
- Ali, Syed Murtaza (1954). "A chronology of Muslim Faujdars of Sylhet". Proceedings of the Pakistan History Conference. Karachi: Pakistan Historical Society.
- Ali, Syed Murtaza (1965). হযরত শাহ জালাল ও সিলেটের ইতিহাস (in Bengali). Dhaka: Bangla Academy.
- Khan, Muazzam Hussain (2012). "Musa Khan". In Sirajul Islam; Miah, Sajahan; Khanam, Mahfuza; Ahmed, Sabbir (eds.). Banglapedia: the National Encyclopedia of Bangladesh (Online ed.). Dhaka, Bangladesh: Banglapedia Trust, Asiatic Society of Bangladesh. ISBN 984-32-0576-6. OCLC 52727562. OL 30677644M.
- Rizvi, S. N. H. (1969). East Pakistan District Gazetteers: Dacca. East Pakistan Government Press.
- Rizvi, S. N. H. (1970). East Pakistan District Gazetteers: Sylhet. East Pakistan Government Press.
- Roy, Atul Chandra (1968). History of Bengal: Mughal Period, 1526-1765 A.D. Calcutta: Nababharat Publishers.
- Sarkar, Jadunath (1948). The History of Bengal. Vol. II (First ed.). Dacca: The University of Dacca.
- Tripathi, Ram Prasad (1960). Rise and Fall of the Mughal Empire. Allahabad: Central Book Depot.
