= Battle of Dodah =

Afghan tribal warfare battle 1680s

Battle of Dodah (1680)
Date	c. 1680
Location	Dodah, Khyber Pakhtunkhwa
Result	Khattak victory

Belligerents
Khattak tribe	Bangash tribe As vassals of the Mughal Empire

Commanders and leaders
Khushal Khan Khattak	Sher Muhammad Khan

Casualties and losses
Unknown	160 killed

The Battle of Dodah (1680) was a military engagement fought in 1680 in the Bangash territory of the northwestern frontier, in the present-day Khyber Pakhtunkhwa region of Pakistan. The battle was fought between the forces of Khushal Khan Khattak and the Bangash tribe and resulted in a decisive Khattak victory in which 160 Bangash fighters were killed. The engagement served as the revenge for the earlier Battle of Gumbat, in which Khushal Khan had suffered a defeat and been wounded and temporarily restored Khattak prestige and influence in the Bangash region.

== Background ==
Khushal Khan Khattak advanced with his tribal army against the Bangash forces of Sher Muhammad Bangash Kohati. Despite the offensive motivation behind the campaign, the Khattak forces encountered severe difficulties once the engagement was underway. The Khattak tribesmen suffered from serious internal mismanagement during the battle, which critically undermined their fighting effectiveness. During the battle Sher Muhammad Bangash received an arrow wound from Abid Khan, son of Khushal Khan. As the engagement developed, the Khattak fighters began to flee the field rather than hold their ground. Khushal Khan Khattak himself was wounded in the fighting, further sapping the cohesion and morale of his forces. With the Khattak tribesmen in disarray and its commander incapacitated by injury, the momentum of the battle passed firmly to Sher Muhammad Bangash Kohati and his Bangash fighters, who held their ground and repulsed the attack. The result of the battle was a victory for the Bangash.

== The Battle ==
In 1680, Khushal Khan Khattak advanced once more into the Bangash area with his forces and engaged the Bangash at Dodah. Unlike the disorganised and mismanaged assault at Gumbat, the Khattak forces prevailed in this engagement. The Bangash were defeated, and 160 of their fighters were killed in the battle. The victory decisively reversed the outcome of Gumbat and reasserted Khattak military power in the Bangash region.

== Aftermath ==
Following the arrival of Amir Khan as the new provincial governor of Kabul, the Mughal approach to the frontier changed significantly. While Amir Khan fought military engagements, he did not achieve notable battlefield success. He instead turned to political tactics, in which he proved far more effective. The new governor largely succeeded in bringing peace to the region, and many Afghan tribes came to accept his authority. A significant number of Afghans even joined the Mughal army, undermining the unity of the resistance from within.
