= Ashraf Khan =

Ashraf Khan may refer to:

- Ashraf Hotak or Ashraf Khan, ruler of the Hotak dynasty
- Ashraf Khan (actor), Pakistani comic actor
- Ashraf Ali Khan, Nawab Nazim of Bengal and Bihar

== See also ==
- Ashraf Khan Khattak, ruler of the Khattak clan
