= Ali Masjid =

Narrowest point in the Khyber Pass, Khyber Pakhtunkhwa, Pakistan

Coordinates: 34.029°N 71.262°E

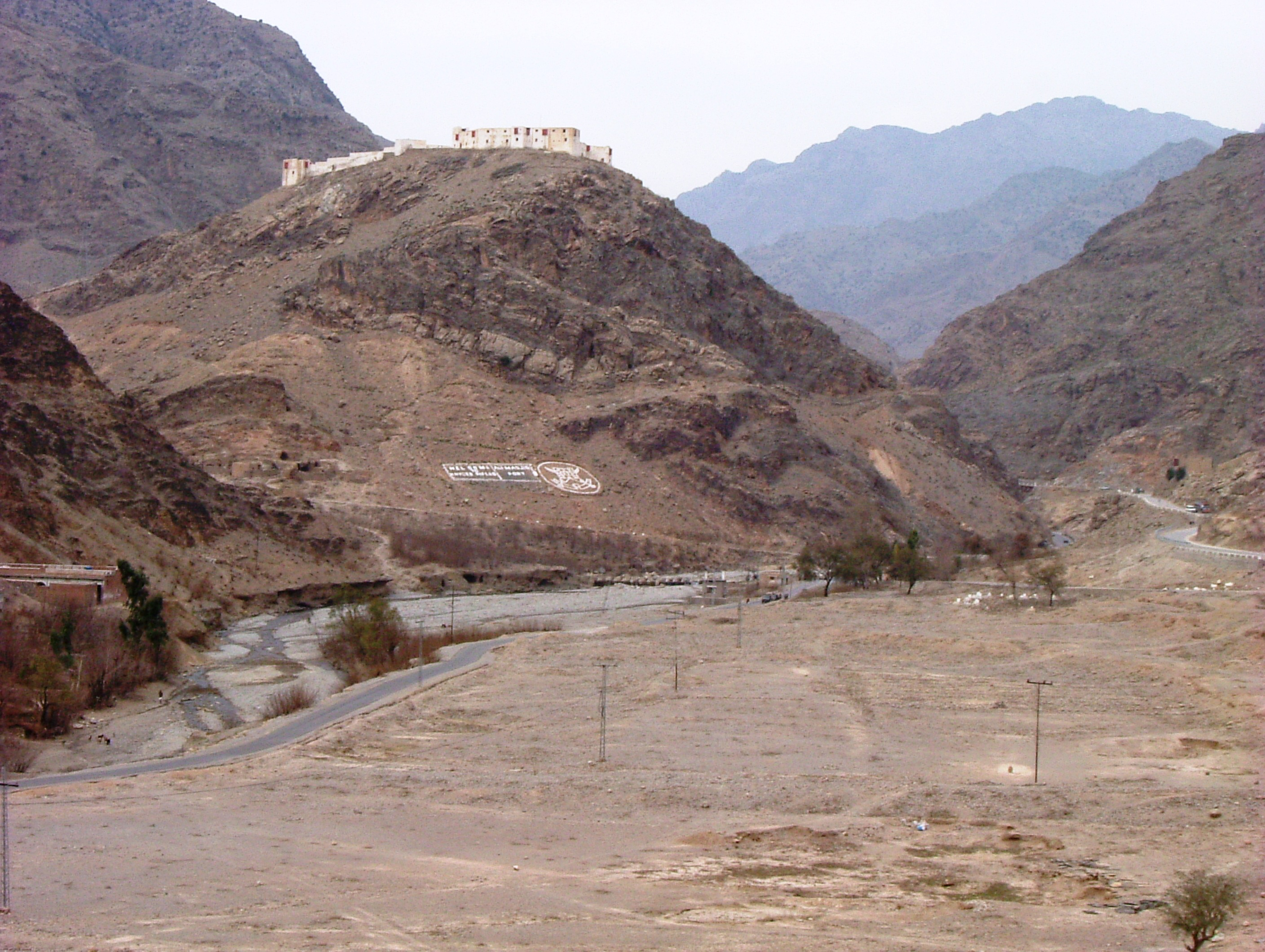
The fort of Ali Masjid today

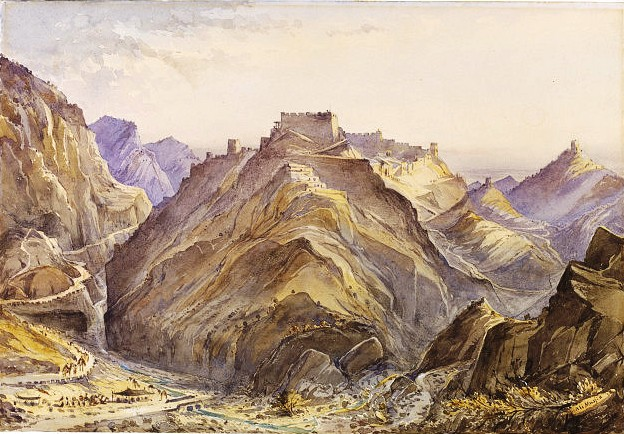
The fort of Ali Masjid (watercolour of 1890)

Ali Masjid (Pashto and Urdu: علی مسجد) is the narrowest point of the Khyber Pass in Khyber District of Khyber Pakhtunkhwa, Pakistan. It is around 10 miles (16 km) east of the city of Landi Kotal (west of Peshawar) and has an elevation of 3,174 feet (967 m). The width of the Khyber near Ali Masjid was earlier too narrow for two fully laden camels to pass each other, but since has been widened.

== Name origin ==
It was named in memory of Ali, the cousin of the Islamic prophet Muhammad. A mosque and a shrine has been built here in the memory of Ali, who visited this place according to a local tradition. There is also a huge boulder which carries the marks of a hand believed to be that of Ali.

== History ==
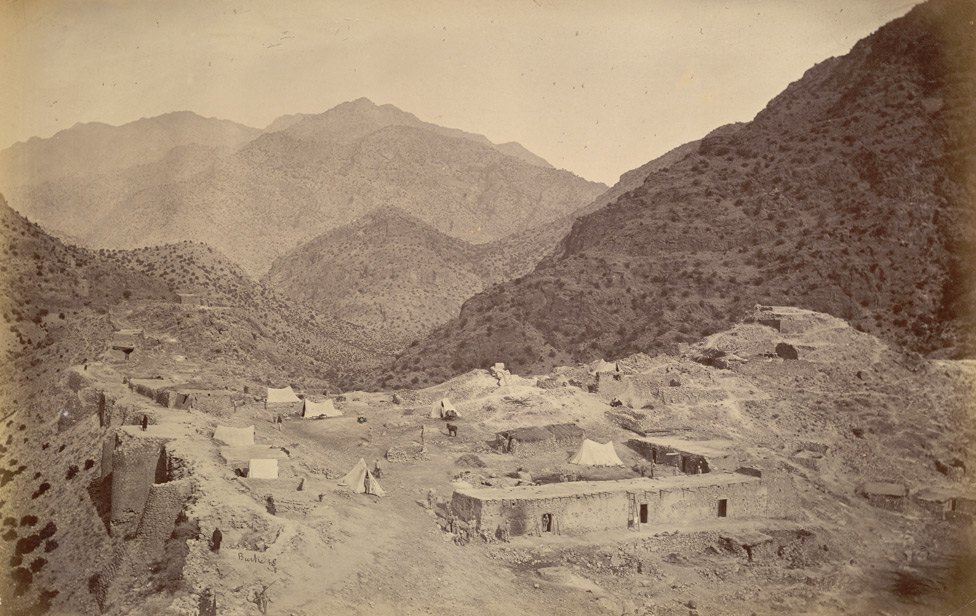
The aftermath of the battle of Ali Masjid

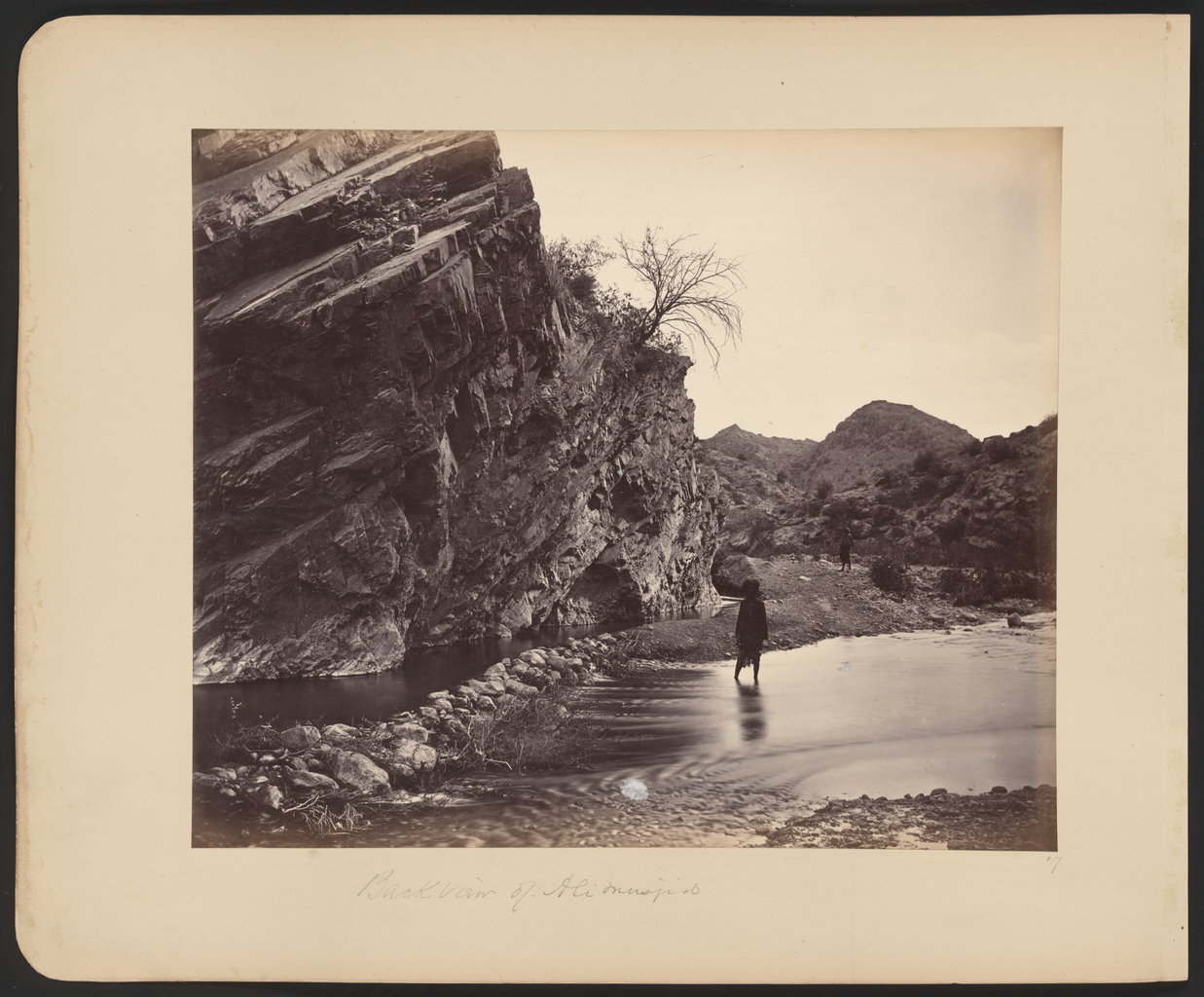
Gorge below Ali Masjid during the Second Anglo-Afghan War

Ali Masjid is located at the narrowest point in the Khyber Pass. It contains a shrine to ʻAlī ibn Abī Ṭālib (circa 600–661) the cousin and son-in-law of Muhammad. Travellers would stop to pray at the shrine while on the trading route between Kadam and Ali Masjid.

The area was originally within Afghanistan, with a fortress built on the height above Ali Masjid in 1837 by the Afghan amir, Dōst Mohammad Khān (1793–1863). The shrine and fort are located in extremely rugged terrain overlooking a deep gorge.

=== Battle of Ali Masjid (1672) ===
The Battle of Ali Masjid was fought on 30 April 1672 between the Mughal Empire and an Afghan tribal coalition led by Aimal Khan Mohmand, Darya Khan Afridi, and Yousef Khan Orakzai. Despite being supported by Khushal Khan Khattak and a large Mughal force, the Mughal army suffered a decisive defeat, with over 40,000 soldiers killed and 20,000 taken prisoner. A subsequent Mughal counteroffensive led by Ashraf Khan was similarly repelled, making it one of the most significant Afghan tribal victories against the Mughal Empire.

=== First battle of Ali Masjid ===
Ali Masjid was the scene of battles during the Anglo-Afghan wars. In 1842 during the First Anglo-Afghan War, the fort was garrisoned by the British. During the disastrous retreat from Kabul, a relief force under Colonel Charles Wild was attacked by Afghan troops of Akbar Khan at the entrance of the Khyber Pass and forced to fall back. The British garrison was forced to evacuate the fort and withdraw to Jamrud.

=== Second battle of Ali Masjid ===
In November 1878, during the Second Anglo-Afghan War, the Peshawar Valley Field Force under General Sir Samuel Browne captured the fort from the Afghans under Faiz Muhammad.

In May 1879, the Khyber Pass was ceded to British control by the Treaty of Gandamak, after which the fort was within the British Raj. The British then established their own fort on the site, commanding a strategic view over the Khyber Pass. The fort has a small cemetery which contains the graves of British soldiers who fell in the second Afghan War. The valley walls bear insignias of regiments that have served here. The Ali Masjid Mosque is also mentioned in the book Tuzk-i Babur, written by the first king of the Mughal Empire when he captured Kabul in 1505. After that, he travelled to India through the Khyber Pass and stayed at the masjid, later travelling to Peshawar.

== See also ==
- Battle of Ali Masjid, 21 November 1878
