= Battle of Langarkot =

Battle between Afghans and Mughals

Battle of Langarkot (1674)
- Part of Mughal–Afghan Wars
Date	c. 1674
Location	Langarkot, Khyber Pakhtunkhwa
Result	Afghan victory
Territorial changes	Langarkot fort captured by the Afghans

Belligerents
Khattak tribe Yousafzai tribe	Mughal Empire; Gujjars

Commanders and leaders
Khushal Khan Khattak	Faujdar Mir Hazara †

Strength
1500	7000

Casualties and losses
Unknown	4000 killed

The Battle of Langarkot (1674) was a military engagement fought in 1674 between a combined Khattak and Yusufzai tribes under the leadership of Khushal Khan Khattak and the Mughal garrison of the fort of Langarkot, commanded by the faujdar Mir Hazara. The Afghan attack caught the garrison by surprise and resulted in a decisive Afghan victory, in which Mir Hazara and forty Mughal soldiers were killed and the fort was taken.

== Background ==
Khushal Khan left Swat and travelled to Maidan, where he was met by a gathering of the Mandanr Yusufzai, dwelling in the plain area, who had assembled in anticipation of his arrival. The combined force established themselves at Panjpir for a period, where tribal leaders conferred, discussed various plans, and devised a coordinated strategy. From this deliberation emerged a plan to attack the Mughal troops stationed at the fort of Langarkot, a Mughal installation garrisoned by both Afghan and Mughal soldiers and commanded by its faujdar, Mir Hazara. A tribal tribesmen was formally organised under Khushal Khan's overall leadership, and the plan of attack was finalised.

== The Battle ==
The Afghan tribesmen advanced on the fort of Langarkot and surrounded it from all sides, cutting off the garrison and creating panic among the soldiers stationed within. Despite the resources and numerical strength available to the defenders, they found themselves unable to respond effectively to the scale and enthusiasm of the attacking Afghan force. The garrison initially considered mounting a defence and repulsing the attack. However, the superiority of the Afghan tactical approach combined with the speed and suddenness of the assault took the defenders completely by surprise and overwhelmed any organised resistance before it could be mounted. Mir Hazara was killed in the fighting along with forty other Mughal soldiers. The fort fell to the Afghans, marking a clear and complete victory for Khushal Khan and his Yusufzai allies. Following the victory, Khushal Khan and his Yusufzai followers pursued the Gujjars of the area, who were alleged to have played a pro-Mughal role during the war and defeated them.

== Aftermath ==
In October 1674, shortly after the fall of Langarkot, Aurangzeb replaced Mahabat Khan with Fidai Khan as the provincial governor of Kabul. Fidai Khan arrived with advanced military equipment and a mandate to reassert Mughal authority over the frontier. Among his first actions, he ordered Ashraf Khan a son of Khushal Khan who had entered Mughal service to lead a Khattak force against the Adam Khel Afridi. The Afridis, however, prevailed in the engagement. Khushal Khan, outraged by his son's collaboration with the Mughals, publicly denounced Ashraf Khan as an enemy.

== See also ==
- Mughal-Afghan Wars
- Yusufzai
