= Khyber Rifles =

Pakistani border security and paramilitary force

- Founded: November 1878
- Country: British Raj 1878–1947; Pakistan (1947 onwards)
- Branch: Civil Armed Forces
- Role: Border patrol Counterterrorism; Counterinsurgency; Special operations
- Size: 7 Wings
- Part of: Frontier Corps Khyber Pakhtunkhwa (North)
- Regimental centre: Shagai Fort

Commanders
- Current commander: Colonel Asim Kiyani

The Khyber Rifles are a paramilitary regiment, forming part of the Pakistani Frontier Corps Khyber Pakhtunkhwa (North). The Rifles are tasked with defending the border with Afghanistan and assisting with law enforcement in the districts adjacent to the border. Raised in the late nineteenth century, the regiment provided the title and setting for the widely read novel King of the Khyber Rifles, and is the oldest regiment of the Corps. The regiment has a 2020/21 budget of Rs. 1.816 billion (1800 crore PKR) and is composed of seven battalion-sized wings.

== History ==
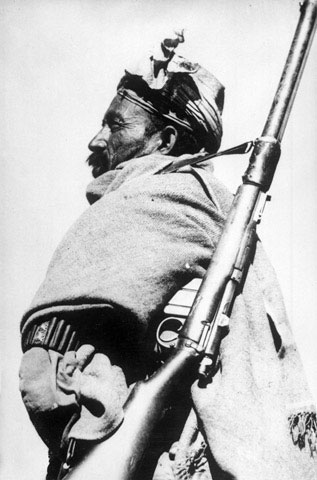
A member of the Khyber Rifles, 1946

During the period of British rule, the Khyber Rifles was one of eight "Frontier Corps" or paramilitary units recruited from the tribesmen of the North West Frontier, serving as auxiliaries for the regular British Indian Army. Raised in the early 1880s as the Khyber Jezailchis; (a jezail being a type of home made musket), the Khyber Rifles recruited from Afridi tribesmen, with British commanders seconded from regular British Indian army regiments. Subordinate officers were Afridis. The first commandant was Sir Robert Warburton, son of an Anglo-Irish soldier Robert Warburton of the Bengal Artillery and his wife Shah Jehan Begum, an Afghan princess. Sir Robert remained the commandant until his retirement in 1899. His deputy, Colonel Sir Aslam Khan Sadozai, the first Muslim commandant, succeeded him. Then, the deputy to Colonel Sir Aslam Khan Sadozai was Malik Afridi Khan of Mulazai. Although the deputy, Malik Afridi Khan spent most of his time as the acting in charge of the Khyber Rifles due to the extensive leave of Sir Aslam.

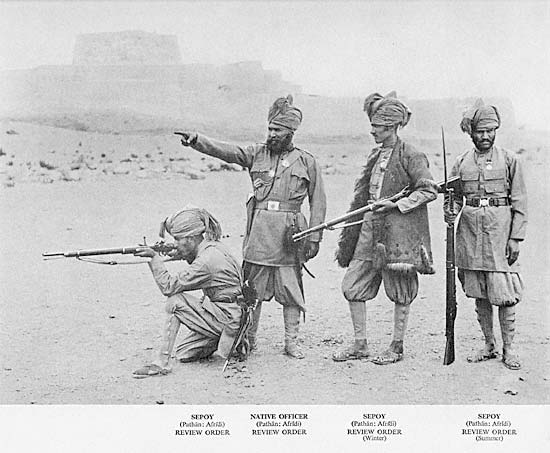
An officer of the Khyber Rifles giving orders to his sepoys in 1895.

=== 19th century campaigns ===
The regiment saw active service in the Black Mountain expeditions of 1888 and 1891, during a period when the Khyber Pass itself remained peaceful. In August 1897 however, the Khyber Afridi tribes rose and the three forts garrisoned by the Khyber Rifles were overrun, the survivors falling back to Jamrud. It took four months and forty-four thousand troops for the British to retake the Khyber Pass. The Khyber Rifles were reconstituted and resumed their garrisons at Landi Kotal, Fort Maude and Ali Masjid.

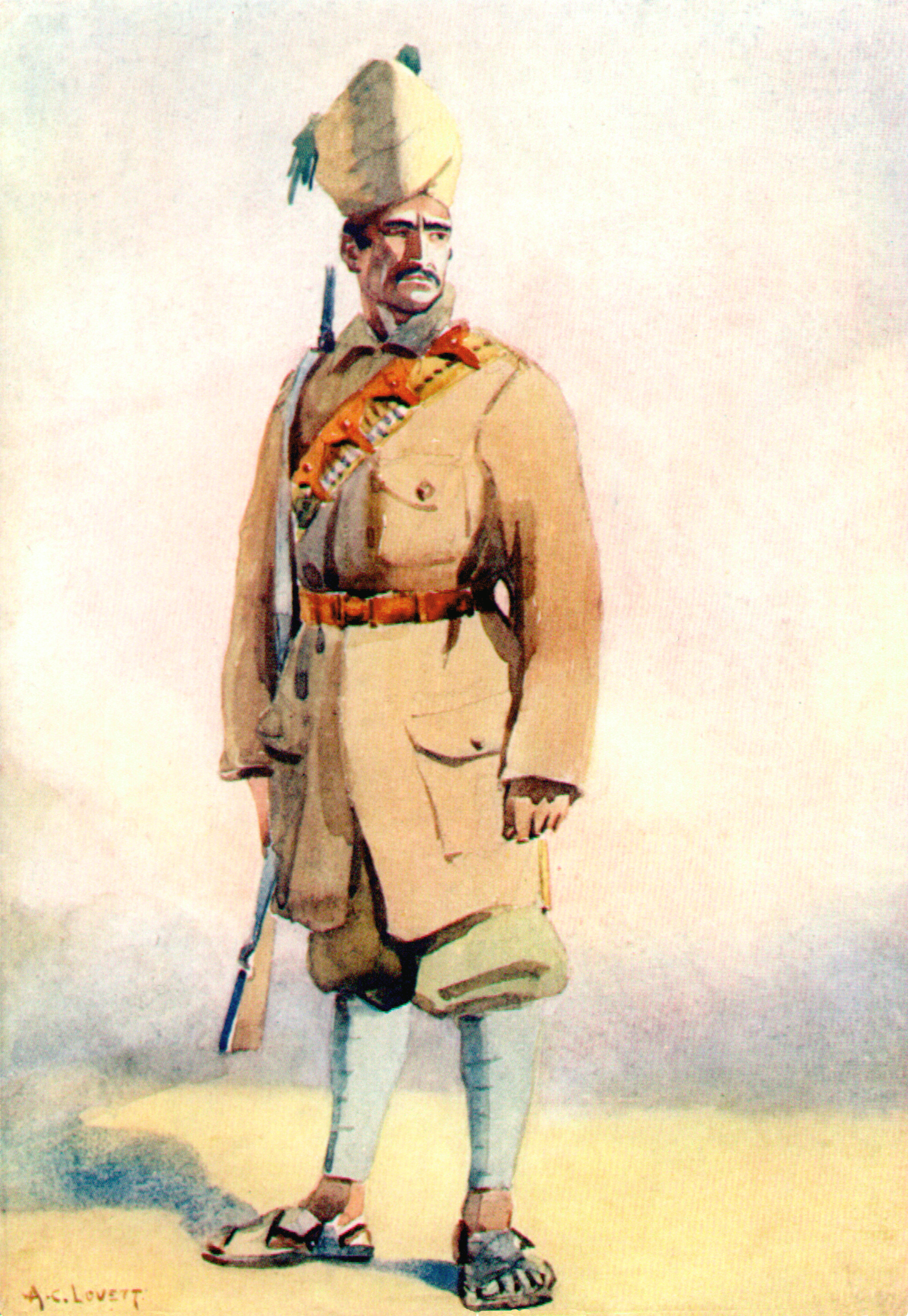
Khyber Rifles. Watercolour by Maj AC Lovett, 1910.

=== Disbandment and re-establishment ===
During the Third Anglo-Afghan War (1919), the loyalty of the Khyber Rifles was put under heavy strain and there were a number of desertions. The regiment was therefore deemed as unreliable and disbanded. Of the serving personnel 1,180 opted to be discharged, while smaller numbers transferred to a military police battalion or were formed into a newly raised Khyber Levy Corps.

The Khyber Rifles was however reconstituted from Afridi veterans of World War II in 1946, with its headquarters at Landi Kotal. The commander of the reborn regiment was himself an Afridi, Sharif Khan.

In August 1947, upon partition, the Khyber Rifles and the other Frontier Corps regiments were transferred to Pakistan. In addition to its traditional policing duties in the tribal areas of the Khyber region, the Khyber Rifles provided detachments to serve in Kashmir and East Pakistan. The regiment is currently involved in tracking down fugitives and terrorists.

== Locations ==
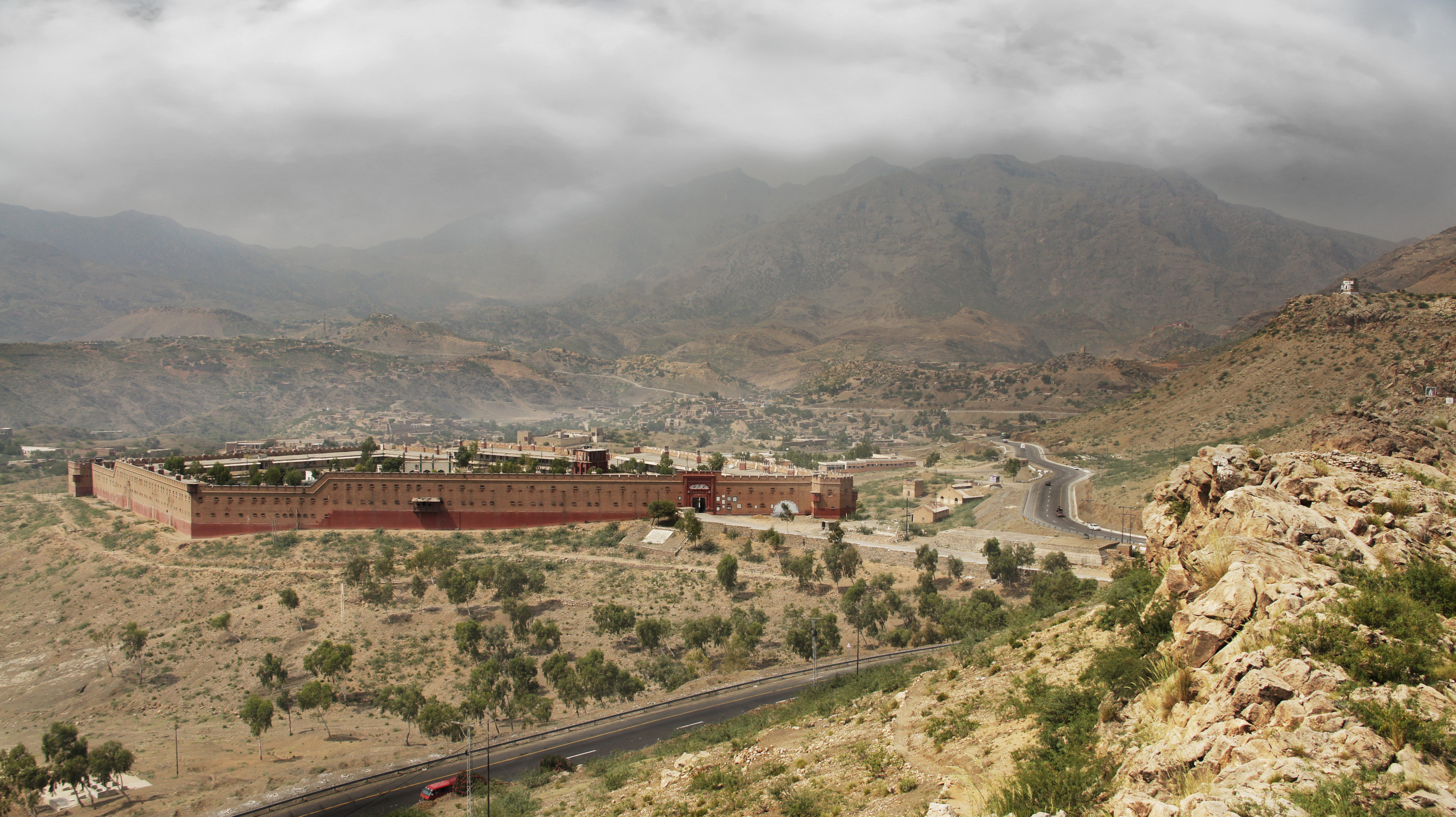
Shagai Fort, headquarters of the Khyber Rifles

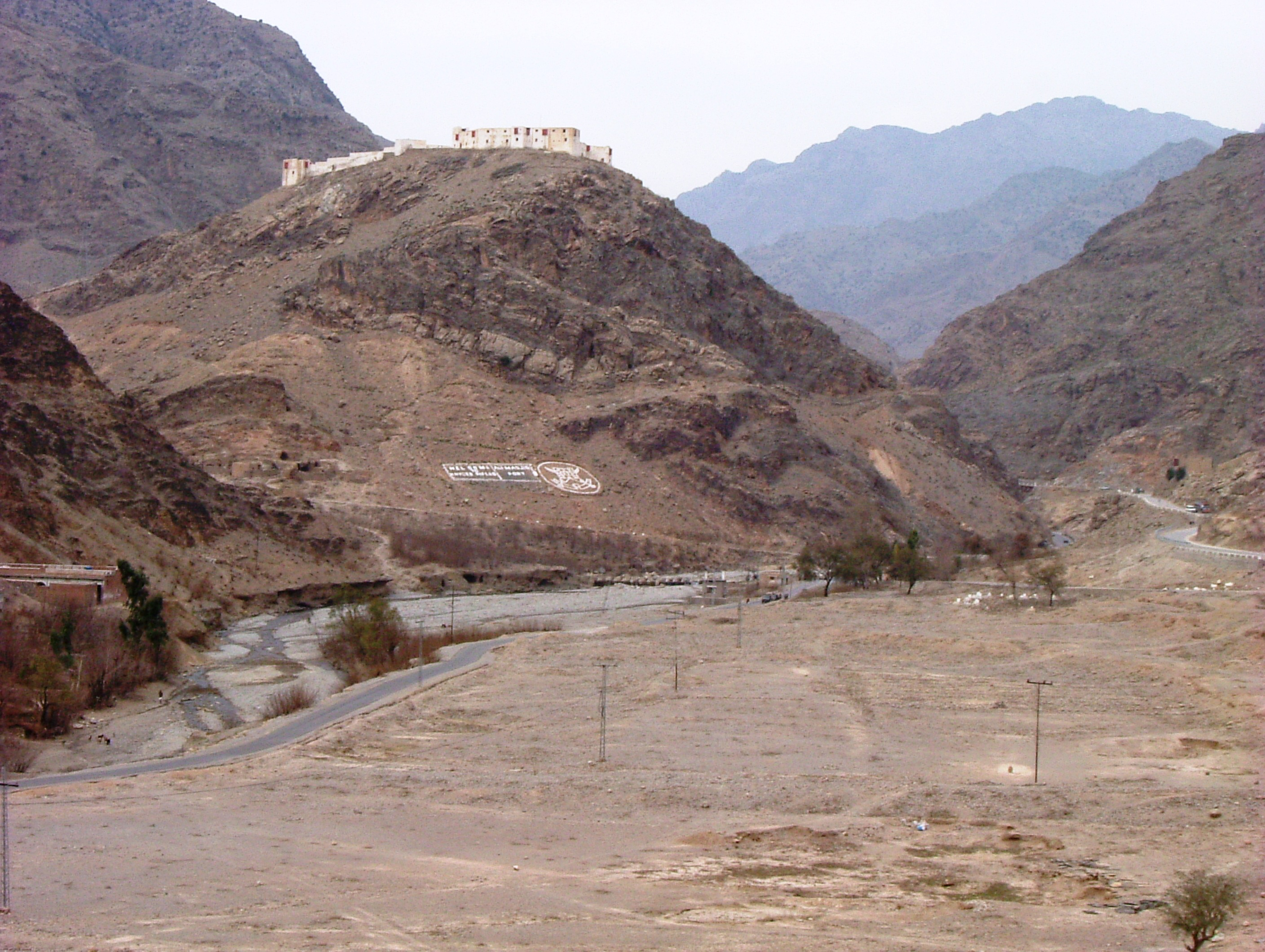
Ali Masjid Fort

The headquarters of the Khyber Rifles were at Landi Kotal. Its prime role was to guard the Khyber Pass. The three main garrisons of the regiment were Landi Kotal, at the western end of the Pass, Fort Maude to the east, and Ali Masjid in the centre.

== The guardians of the Khyber Pass ==
The force is responsible for guarding the Khyber Pass that provides the historical land connection between South Asia and the resource rich Central Asia. The Khyber Rifles ensures defence of the Khyber Pass by protecting the border town of Torkham. This is the site of the main transit terminal between Pakistan and Afghanistan for international trade and tourism via Pakistan's longest National Highway 5. The Khyber Rifles also patrol the several hundred kilometers of border barrier of Khyber District with the Nangarhar Province of Afghanistan; effectively providing defence to the Khyber Pass and Peshawar Valley.

The force is also tasked with securing strategic installations located across the Khyber region and Peshawar Valley. One of the strategic site that the Khyber Rifles guard is the Warsak Dam located on the Kabul River which is the prime source of drinking water for the Peshawar Valley.

The responsibilities of the Khyber Rifles are:

- Border patrol
- Assist Army/FCNA in the defense of the country as and when required
- Protect important communication centers and routes
- Undertake counter militancy/criminal/terrorism operations on orders
- Assist law enforcement agencies in maintenance of law and order
- Safeguard important sites and assets

During times of extraordinary law and order crisis, the government occasionally grants power to the Khyber Rifles to arrest and detain criminals.

== Insignia and uniform ==
The badge of the Corps comprised two crossed Afghan daggers with the words KHYBER above and RIFLES below.

While the Indian Army as a whole was noted for its colourful and elaborate dress uniforms prior to 1914, the various units of the Frontier Corps wore only plain khaki drill uniforms and turbans.

== Units ==
- Headquarters Wing
- 101 Wing
- 102 Wing
- 103 Wing
- 104 Wing
- 105 Wing
- 106 Wing
- 107 Wing
- Field Battery

== See also ==
- King of the Khyber Rifles (1919 novel)
- Shagai Fort
- Civil Armed Forces
- Law enforcement in Pakistan
