= Darya Khan Afridi =

Afghan Warrior and chief

Darya Khan Afridi (Pashto: دریا خان افريدي), was a Pashtun warrior and chief. Darya Khan fought against the Mughal Empire along with the Mohmand tribal chief, Aimal Khan Mohmand. In 1672, Khan closed the Khyber Pass and Proclaimed a tribal war against Mughal Empire. Khan is known for the Afridi uprising of 1672 in which the prominent Mughal commander Shujaat Khan was killed.

== Military Career ==
=== Battle of Ali Masjid (1672) ===
In 1672, during spring, the Mughal governor of Kabul Muhammad Amin, fell into an ambush orchestrated by Afghan tribes under Aimal Khan Mohmand at Ali Masjid. 40,000 Mughals were killed, and 20,000 men and women were captured. some people refer it as the Battle of Landi Kotal.

=== Battle of Nowshera (1674) ===
Khushal Khan Khattak, along with his tribe, long-serving allies of the Mughals, joined forces with Aimal Khan and Darya Khan. Together, they led an attack with an army of eight thousand Afghan tribesmen on the Mughal fort in Nowshera. The fort was plundered, and Pir Paie, the fort's sobedar, was slain. The Mughal forces incurred significant losses in this battle.

=== Battle of Kohat ===
Buoyed by the string of Afghan successes, Darya Khan Afridi grew overconfident. Rather than waiting for a coordinated assault alongside Khushal Khan Khattak, he decided to attack the fort of Kohat alone, believing he could secure victory for his people without the need for combined forces. The Bangash garrison at Kohat was commanded by Sher Muhammad Bangash Kohati, who successfully repulsed the Afridi assault. During the fighting, Darya Khan's younger brother, Tatar Khan, was killed in combat. Darya Khan Afridi's forces suffered significant losses including more than a hundred fighters and were forced to withdraw without taking the fort. The Mughals found the Bangash useful and rewarded Sher Muhammad Bangash Kohati for his successful defence of the fort.
