= Malik Akora khan Khattak =

16th century tribal Chief

Malik Akora Khattak
- Born: c. 1550 Mughal Empire
- Died: 1600
- Resting place: Akora Khattak, Nowshera District, Khyber Pakhtunkhwa, present day Pakistan
- Other name: Ako
- Known for: Grandfather of Khushal Khan Khattak, First Chief of Khattak tribe
- Children: Shahbaz Khan Khattak

Malik Akorai, also known as Ako, was the first Chief of the Khattak tribe in the 16th century. Originally from Karbogha, he later moved to Khwarra due to a quarrel with his Karbogha relatives. Ako, with his tribe, engaged in conflicts with the neighboring Bangashes of Darsamand. Notably, Ako resisted Mughal Empire's forces and secured favorable terms, including a transit duty on cattle along the Peshawar-Attock road. He established Akora, which became the tribe's capital.

== Early life and ancestry ==
Akor Khan is the son of Darwish Muhammad Khan Chanjo. Akor Khan hailed from the Barak Khattak lineage, tracing his roots back to Tari and Luqman alias Khattak. His ancestral connections extended to Karlan, from which various sub-branches of the Karlanri Pakhtuns originated.

=== Settlement in Akora Khattak ===
In 1581, Mughal Emperor Jalal-ud-din Muhammad Akbar sought to address the menace posed by Malik Akor Khan, who was notorious for robbing troops along the highways. To curb his unlawful activities, Akbar appointed him as a government servant responsible for collecting tolls from caravans crossing the Indus River at Attock.

Akor Khan settled in what is now known as Akora Khattak, previously called Sarai Malik Pura. His leadership and generosity endeared him to both the rich and the poor. The village took its name from him, and he became the first patriarch of the Akor Khattak dynasty.

== Alliance with Emperor Akbar ==
In 1585, Akor Khan formed an alliance with Mughal Emperor Akbar. The emperor entrusted him with the crucial duty of protecting the highway between Khairabad and Nowshera. Akor Khan's intelligence and strength impressed Akbar, leading to this appointment.

=== Taxation and Protection ===
Rather than accepting a formal rank (mansab), Akor Khan proposed an alternative approach. He suggested imposing a toll on the highway, motivating his tribesmen to fulfill their duty faithfully. Akbar agreed, issuing a royal firman for the levy of taxes. Akor Khan and his tribesmen settled at Sara-i-Akora (Akora Khattak) along the main highway, ensuring its safety and facilitating trade and travel.

=== Rewards and Leadership ===
Akor Khan's boldness and courage caught Akbar's attention. As a reward, he received the areas between Khairabad and Nowshera as a jagir. Additionally, he was authorized to collect taxes and tolls from caravans. Akor Khan emerged as a potential leader who would reduce the influence of the Yusufzai tribe.He also made two-three successful raids on the territories of Afridis.

=== Challenges and Tragic End ===
Despite Akbar's honors, Akor Khan was unable to become the Chief of the entire Khattak Tribe. His pro-Mughal stance faced opposition from rival Khattak tribesmen, especially the Bolaq Khattaks. Akor Khan's imposition of illegal taxation on his own people led to resentment. Tragically, Nazo Khan, a Bolaq Khattak, killed Akor Khan and his son Yusuf at Pir Sabaq. In retaliation, Yahya Khan later avenged their deaths by killing several Bolaq Khattaks.

=== Shahbaz Khan's Leadership ===
Following Akor Khan's demise, Shahbaz Khan, Yahya Khan's successor, shifted his focus to the Yusufzais. This strategic move benefited Shahbaz Khan in two ways: He made peace with fellow Khattak tribesmen, solidifying his leadership within the tribe. His undisputed position gained greater official support and acceptability from the Mughals.

== Anti Mughal Campaign ==
Akor Khan's reputation extended beyond his tribe. His boldness and tactical skills made him a force to be reckoned with. He extracted taxes from passing caravans, even daring to loot royal convoys. His audacity drew the attention of local Mughal officials, particularly Shah Beg, the wali (governor) of Peshawar. He later killed Shah Beg's brother.

=== Tribal Jealousies and Conflict ===
In 1584–85, Akor Khan's clash with the Mughals escalated. He killed Shah Begum's brother during a battle, prompting the Mughals to send reinforcements from Peshawar. This incident marked a critical turning point in the delicate balance of power which led to two battles between Mughals and the Khattaks, resulting in victories for the latter. Following these victories, Akor Khan became a strong figure in the region, significantly enhancing the Khattaks' power.
