= Ziarat Kaka Sahib =

- Interactive map of Ziarat Kaka Sahib
- Coordinates: 33°50′54.1″N 71°52′14.2″E
- Country: Pakistan
- Province: Khyber-Pakhtunkhwa
- District: Nowshera District
- Time zone: UTC+5 (PST)

Ziarat Kaka Sahib (Pashto: کاکا صېب مزار) is a town located in the Nowshera District of the Khyber Pakhtunkhwa province of Pakistan. It was named after a sufi saint Kaka Sahib.

== Buildings ==
The shrine of the sixteenth century's most popular Sufi saint Kaka Sahib is located in a rugged mountainous area around 12 km south of the Nowshera city. It is considered as one of the most frequently visited religious heritage sites in Khyber Pakhtunkhwa.
