= Battle of Nowshera (1674) =

- Part of Mughal–Afghan Wars
Date	1674
Location	Nowshera, Mughal Empire (present-day Khyber Pakhtunkhwa, Pakistan)
Result	Afghan victory

Belligerents
Afghans; Khattak; Afridi; Mohmand	Mughals; Mughal Empire

Commanders and leaders
Khushal Khan Khattak; Darya Khan Afridi; Aimal Khan Mohmand	Pir Paie †

Strength
8,000	Unknown

Casualties and losses
Unknown	Heavy

The Battle of Nowshera (1674) was a major confrontation between the Afghan tribal alliance under Khushal Khan Khattak and the forces of the Mughal Empire stationed at the fort of Nowshera. The engagement marked one of the earliest coordinated tribal uprisings against Mughal authority in the frontier region.

== Background ==
Following rising discontent among the Pashtun tribes, Khushal Khan Khattak, who had once served the Mughals, became disillusioned with their policies and imprisonment of tribal leaders. Around this time, Darya Khan Afridi sought Khushal’s counsel over reconciliation with the Mughals, which led Khushal to exploit the divisions between Darya Khan and the imperial authorities. Supported by the Afridis and Mohmands, Khushal redirected his efforts toward open resistance against Mughal rule.

As internal disputes within the Khattak tribe weakened Khushal’s local standing, he reached out to the Afridis and Mohmands to forge a united front. A jirga held at Rajgarh formalized their alliance, and it was agreed that the campaign would begin with an assault on the Mughal fort at Nowshera.

== Battle ==
Khushal Khan Khattak, along with his tribe, long-serving allies of the Mughals, joined forces with Aimal Khan and Darya Khan. Together, they led an attack with an army of eight thousand Afghan tribesmen on the Mughal fort in Nowshera. The fort was plundered, and Pir Paie, the fort's sobedar, was slain. The Mughal forces incurred significant losses in this battle.

The combined Afghan force of roughly eight thousand tribesmen, including Khattaks, Afridis, and Mohmands, advanced towards Nowshera. The army was led by Khushal Khan Khattak, Darya Khan Afridi, Tatar Khan Afridi, and Aimal Khan Mohmand. They engaged the Mughal garrison of approximately three thousand soldiers commanded by Pir Paie, the subedar of the fort.

After a brief but intense clash, the Afghan tribes overran the Mughal defenses. The fort was stormed and plundered, with Pir Paie slain in battle. Khushal Khan fought alongside his sons, Abid Khan and Abdul Qadir Khan, marking one of his last major military exploits.

== Aftermath ==
The victory at Nowshera emboldened the Afghan tribes and further destabilized Mughal control in the frontier. The defeat alarmed the Mughal governor, Mahabat Khan, who attempted to restore order by negotiating with Khushal Khan and inviting him to court efforts which Khushal rejected.

In the months following the battle, guerrilla warfare intensified across the region, particularly near Charsadda and Duwabah, as Afghan fighters repeatedly ambushed Mughal caravans and military detachments. Emperor Aurangzeb subsequently ordered stronger measures to subdue the frontier, but the Afghan resistance persisted for years, cementing Khushal Khan’s legacy as a symbol of Pashtun defiance against imperial authority.
