= Aimal Khan Mohmand =

Afghan ruler

Aimal Khan Mohmand (Pashto: ايمل خان مهمند), also known as Aimal Shah (Pashto: ايمل شاه), was a prominent 17th century Pashtun ruler, military commander, and chief, who proclaimed himself king and declared the holy war (Jihad) against the Mughal empire. He was considered a prominent warrior in the Mughal–Afghan Wars. Khan spent most of his life Against Aurangzeb. He was well known for Greatest Afghan Revolt in 1670s in which numerous Mughal Military commanders including Shujaat Khan were killed. Darya Khan Afridi was a close ally of Khan in the military campaign against Aurangzeb Alamgir. After this campaign, Aurangzeb Alamgir marched towards Peshawar and restored peace with the help of some Afghan chiefs.

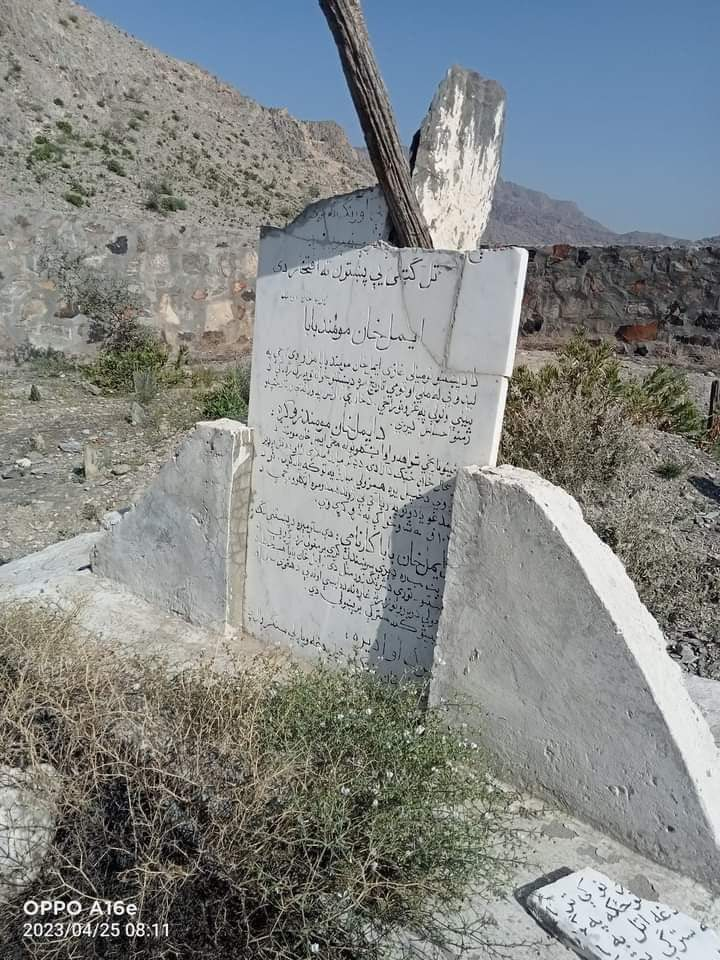
Aimal Khan Mohmand Grave in Afghanistan.

== Background ==
The Pashtun borderland faced a pivotal moment when a Safi girl was dishonored by the Mughal soldiers, deeply angering the Pashtuns. To avenge this disgrace, a coalition comprising Afridi, Shinwari, Mohmand forces, and the Safi tribal lashkar, first executed the perpetrators and then defeated Hussain Beg, the Mughal faujdar of Kunar. Muhammad Amin, aggrieved by this defeat, sought significant retaliation.

== National Movement ==
Upon a general Afghan uprising against the Mughal authority in 1672, Aimal Khan crowned himself as king and struck coins in his own name. He called for all Pashtun tribes to join the national movement.

== Battles and Campaigns ==
=== Battle of Ali Masjid (1672) ===
In 1672, during spring, the Mughal governor of Kabul Muhammad Amin, fell into an ambush orchestrated by Afghan tribes under Aimal Khan Mohmand at Ali Masjid. Around forty thousand Mughals were killed, and twenty thousand men and women were captured. some people refer it as the Battle of Landi Kotal.

=== Battle of Nowshera (1674) ===
Khushal Khan Khattak, along with his tribe, long-serving allies of the Mughals, joined forces with Aimal Khan and Darya Khan. Together, they led an attack with an army of eight thousand Afghan tribesmen on the Mughal fort in Nowshera. The fort was plundered, and Pir Paie, the fort's sobedar, was slain. The Mughal forces incurred significant losses in this battle.

=== Doaba Campaign ===
After the Mughal defeat at Nowshera, Aimal Khan inflicted a crushing defeat on the Mughal commander Mir Hussain at Doaba.

=== Battle of Karrapa Pass (1674) ===
Shujaat Khan, known for suppressing the Satnami uprising, was dispatched by Aurangzeb to suppress Afghan resistance. In February 1674, Shujaat Khan set off from Peshawar towards Kabul via the Mohmand area. Aimal Khan Mohmand saw an opportunity to give Mughals a pitched battle. He aggressively pursued Shujaat Khan into the Gandab valley, encircling the Mughals from three sides. The sudden and fierce attack led to the death of thousands of Mughal soldiers, causing many to flee. Shujaat Khan sustained fatal wounds and died during the battle. Maharaja Jaswant Singh narrowly escaped with a few followers from the battlefield.

=== Battle of Jagdalak (1675) ===
In 1675, the Afghans handed Fidai Khan a significant defeat at Jagdalak while he was heading to Peshawar.

=== Battle of Khapush (1675) ===
In June 1675, the Mughal army faced a significant defeat in the battle of Khapush. Operating near Khapush in the Bajaur region, Mukarram Khan was lured into an ambush by a Pashtun lashkar led by Aimal Khan and Darya Khan. The Mughals suffered substantial casualties, resulting in the death of their commander, Shamsher Khan. Although severely wounded, Mukarram Khan managed to retreat to the Mughal base in Bajaur.

=== Battle of Laghman (1690) ===
Aimal Khan fought a ferocious and bloody battle with Aghar Khan in Laghman until Aghar Khan was killed by the Afghan forces in 1690.

== Damage done to the Mughals ==
Eventually after the five battles of Ali Masjid, Doababa, Nowshera, Gandab and Khapas and the loss of life of nearly 100,000 people for the Mughals, Aurangzeb was unsuccessful in capitulating the Afghan movement. As Aurangzeb became tired of this prolonged war he left for Delhi in 1676.
