= Shagai Fort =

Fort in Khyber Pakhtunkhwa, Pakistan

- شاغی قلعہ
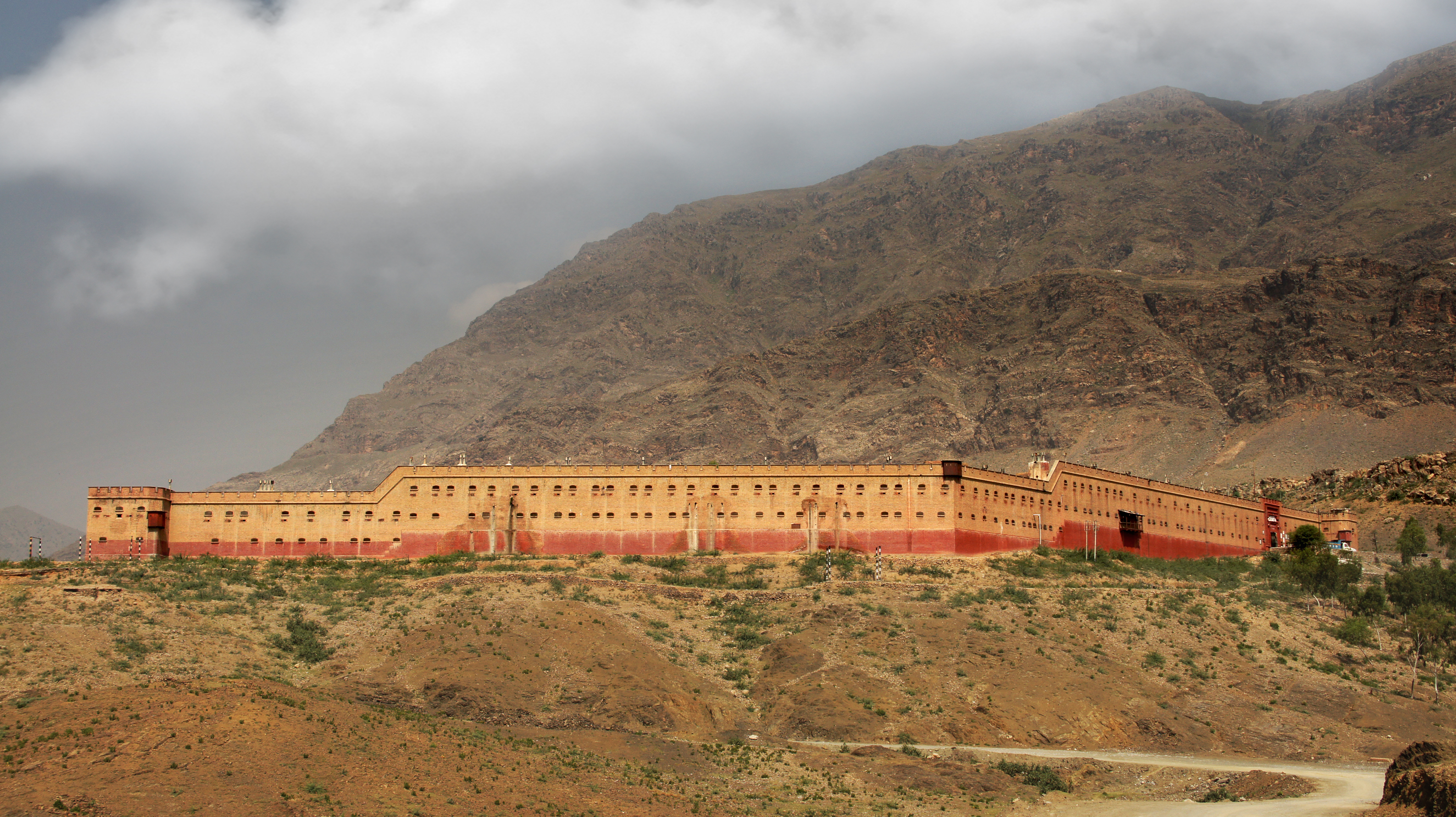
- Shagai Fort overlooking the Khyber Pass

Site information
- Type: Frontier fort
- Owner: Pakistan Army
- Controlled by: Khyber Rifles
- Open to the public: No
- Condition: Operational

Location
- Coordinates: 34.017350°N 71.279887°E

Site history
- Built: 1927
- Built by: British Indian Army
- Materials: Stone and brick
- Battles/wars: Frontier operations (20th c.); Trilateral flag meetings (Pakistan-NATO-Afghanistan)

Garrison information
- Garrison: Pakistani Army & Paramilitary units

Shagai Fort is a fort located 13 kilometres from Jamrud in Khyber District, Khyber Pakhtunkhwa, Pakistan. It was built in 1927 by the British forces to oversee the Khyber Pass. The estimated terrain elevation above sea level is 847 metres. It is defended by Pakistani military and paramilitary troops serving as headquarters for the Khyber Rifles — the traditional guardians of the Khyber Pass.

Trilateral flag meetings among Pakistan, NATO and Afghan military officials are held in this fort.

== History ==
Following the 1971 Bangladesh Liberation War, Shagai Fort served as one of the primary internment sites in Pakistan used to detain thousands of stranded Bengalis, who were held as political leverage for the return of over 90,000 Pakistani prisoners of war held in India. Internment began following the Pakistan Army's military crackdown Operation Searchlight in East Pakistan in March 1971, with Bengali military personnel, civil servants, doctors, and unaccompanied soldiers systematically transferred to the facility through 1973. Originally constructed as a British colonial outpost to guard the Khyber Pass, the fort lacked basic infrastructure to support the detainees. Inspections by the International Committee of the Red Cross (ICRC) documented severe overcrowding, with up to twenty individuals housed per room without adequate bedding, sanitation, latrines, or potable water. Substandard living conditions and insufficient rations led to frequent outbreaks of illness, including chronic fevers, influenza, and chickenpox. Detainees were placed under strict military supervision and stripped of civil rights; those captured attempting to flee across the adjacent Afghanistan-Pakistan border faced solitary confinement or execution. The internment ended following the signing of the Delhi Agreement in August 1973, which facilitated the ICRC supervised repatriation of the surviving detainees to Bangladesh.

== Gallery ==
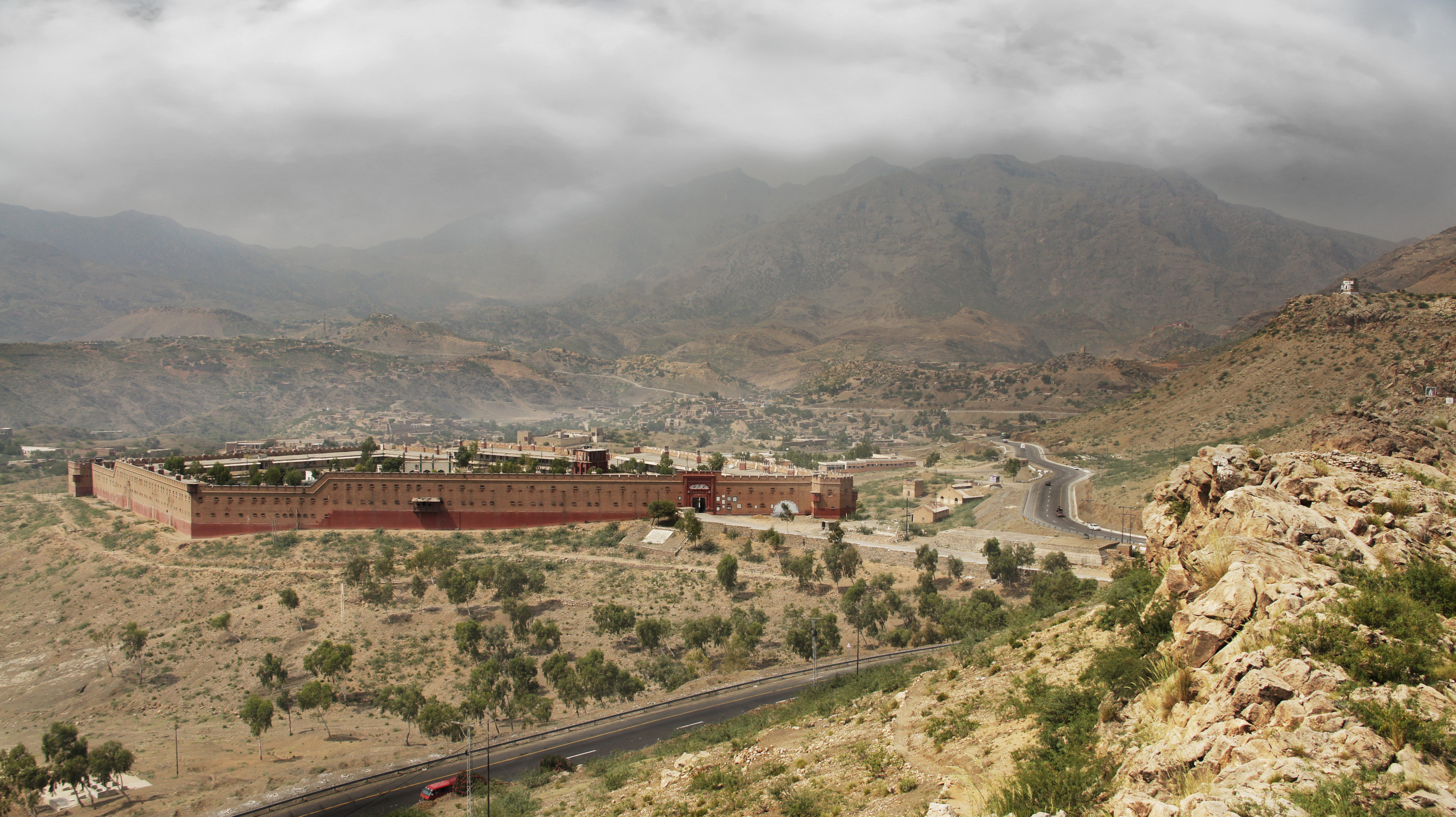
View of fort from a distance

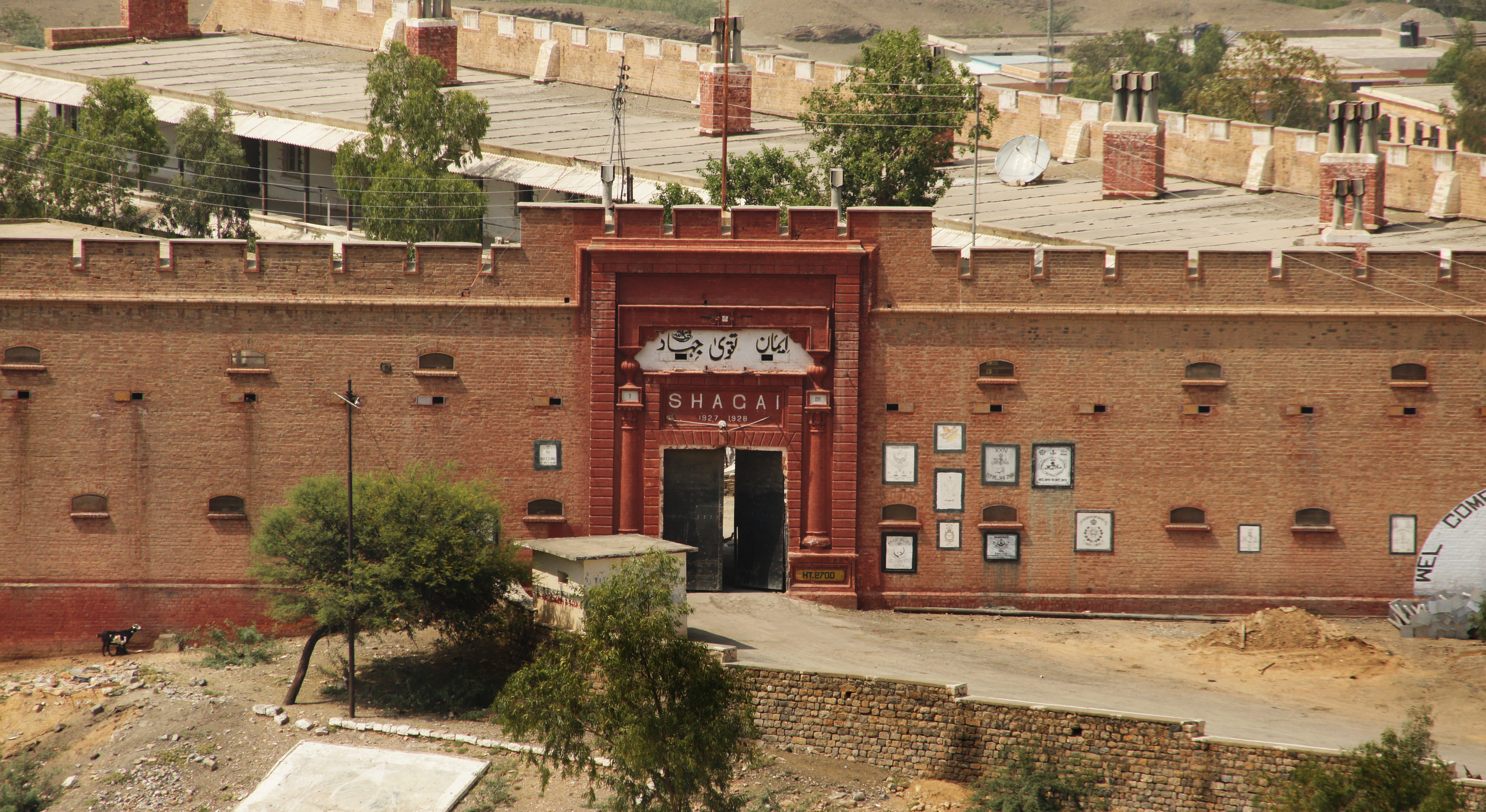
Main gate

== See also ==
- List of forts in Pakistan
