= Gumbat =

Town in Kohat District, Pakistan

Gumbat, also known as Seni Gumbat (Urdu: تحصیل گمبٹ) (Pashto: ګمبټ تحصیل) is a tehsil located in Kohat District of Khyber Pakhtunkhwa, Pakistan. It is situated in a valley on both sides of the Kohat–Rawalpindi Road and is 25 km from the district capital Kohat.
