= Ashraf Khan Khattak =

Khattak clan ruler

- Born: c. 1634
- Father: Khushal Khan Khattak

Ashraf Khan Khattak was the eldest son of Khushal Khan Khattak and ruler of the Khattak clan for a time.

== Life ==
He was born in about 1634 (H.1044). He became chieftain of the Khattak clan in 1693 after his father, Khushal, resigned after the war against the Mughal Emperor ended. He died in 1693, aged 60.

== Chief of the Khattak clan ==
Ashraf endeavoured for some time to carry on the government of his clan, and also to perform his duties towards the Mughal Government, by aiding the Peshawar authorities in the administration of the affairs of that province; but he was opposed and thwarted in all his endeavours by his brother Bahram, who had also endeavoured to take the life of his father; Ashraf styles him as "Bahram the Degenerate", and "The Malignant"; and by whose machinations Ashraf was, at last, betrayed into the hands of Aurangzeb, in 1683. The affairs of the Dakhan having called for the presence of that monarch, who continued in that part of India for several years the Khattak chief was taken along with him, as a state prisoner; and was subsequently sent to the strong fortress of Bijapur, situated in what is, at present, termed the Southern Maharata country, where he continued to languish in exile for the remainder of his life. When Afzal Khan, his son, became firmly established in the chieftainship, he moved the remains of his father about 1,500 miles (2,400 km) from Bijapur to Sara’e, where the Khattak chiefs were usually interred.
