= Kakakhel (tribe) =

Pakinstani tribe

- Sayyid
- Descended from: Islamic prophet Muhammad, Fatimah, Ali
- Branches: Kakakheli, Mian

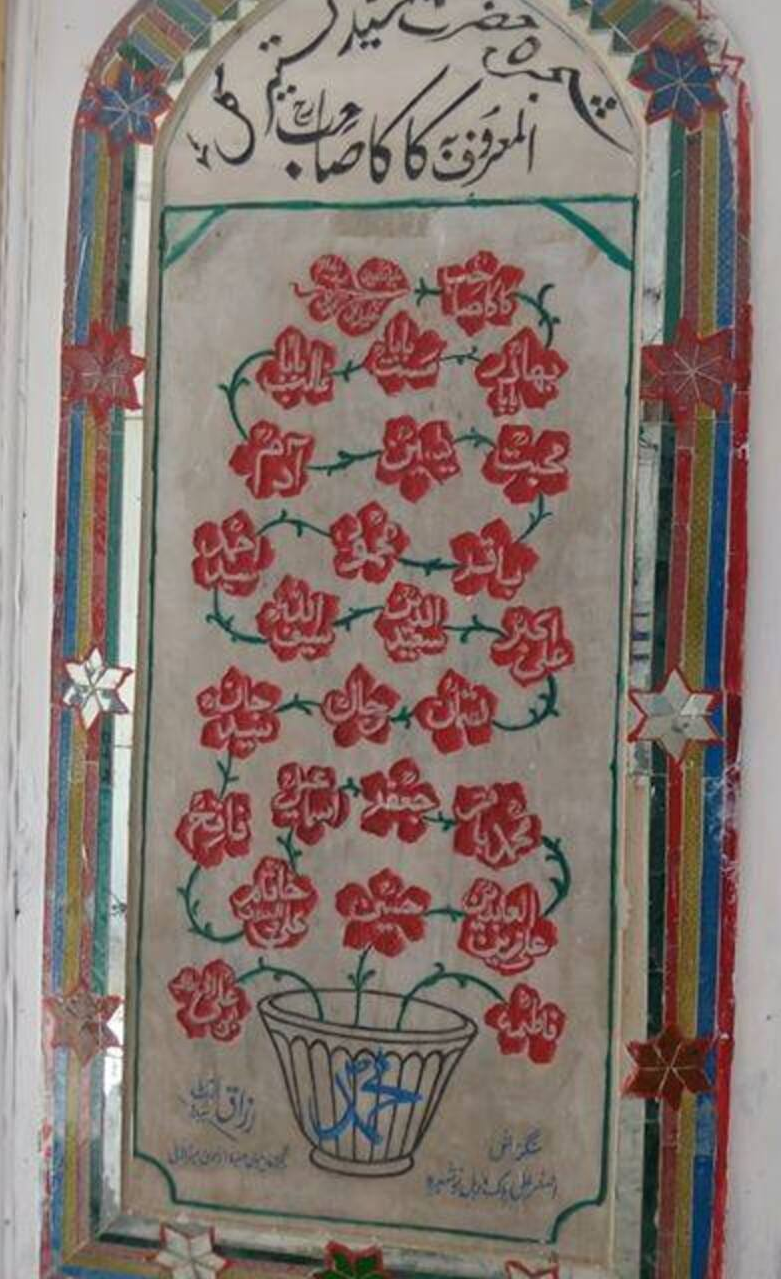
Family Tree of Sayyid Kastir Gul, the progenitor of Kakakhel

The Kakakhel are Sayyid (also spelled as Syed). Their traditional homeland is in Khyber Pakhtunkhwa along with other cities of Pakistan. They were a very small clan until the 13th century. They descend from Sayyid Kastir Gul, also known as "Kaka Sahib". He claimed to be from the lineage of Imam Jafar Sadiq, a grandson of Husayn ibn Ali.

== Notable Kakakhels ==
- Sayyid Kastir Gul, patriarch of the Kakakhel
- Mian Hazrat Jamal Kakakhel
- Mian Muhibullah Kakakhel
- Mian Hayaud Din
- Uzair Gul Peshawari
- Maulvi Nazir
- Syed Adnan Kakakhail
- Feroze Jamal Shah Kakakhel
