= Mian Muhibullah Kakakhel =

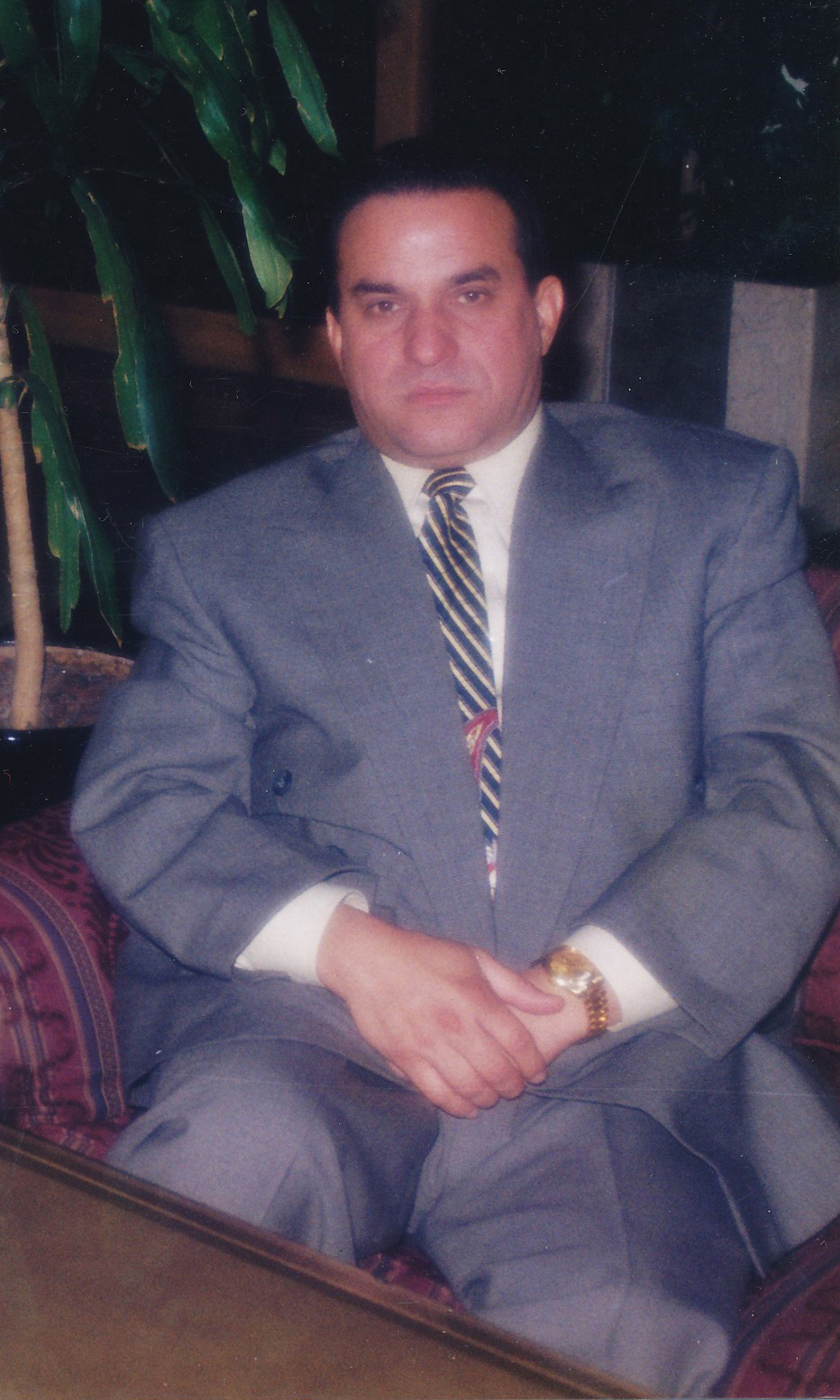
- Born: 3 June 1958 (age 68); Charsadda, Tangi. A village near Peshawar
- Other name: Mian Sahab
- Occupations: Senior Advocate, Supreme Court of Pakistan
- Organization(s): Kakakhel Law Associates (Advocates & Legal Consultants)
- Family: Saifullah Muhib Kakakhel, Advocate (Son) Nouman Muhib Kakakhel, Advocate (Son) Mehwish Muhib Kakakhel, Advocate (Daughter? Zeenat Muhib Kakakhel, Advocate (Daughter) Kainat Muhib Kakakhel, Advocate (Daughter) Neelam Muhib Kakakhel (Daughter)
- Website: www.kakakhellaw.com

Mian Muhibullah Kakakhel is a Pakistani lawyer and senior advocate of the Supreme Court of Pakistan. He is also a former presidential candidate for Pakistan.

During the regime of Muhammad Zia-ul-Haq, he formulated a social plan named Society for Medical Care and Rehabilitation of Drug Addicts (SMARDA) to reduce drug addiction in the country. He is claimed to have experienced resistance and threats from drug traders including intimidation. The society served its purpose to some extent when some government hospitals undertook the treatment of drug addicts, and later SMARDA was dissolved in 1995. In 1991, when the Gulf War occurred, he along with volunteer members provided aid to Iraqis.

== Service in Pakistan Air Force ==
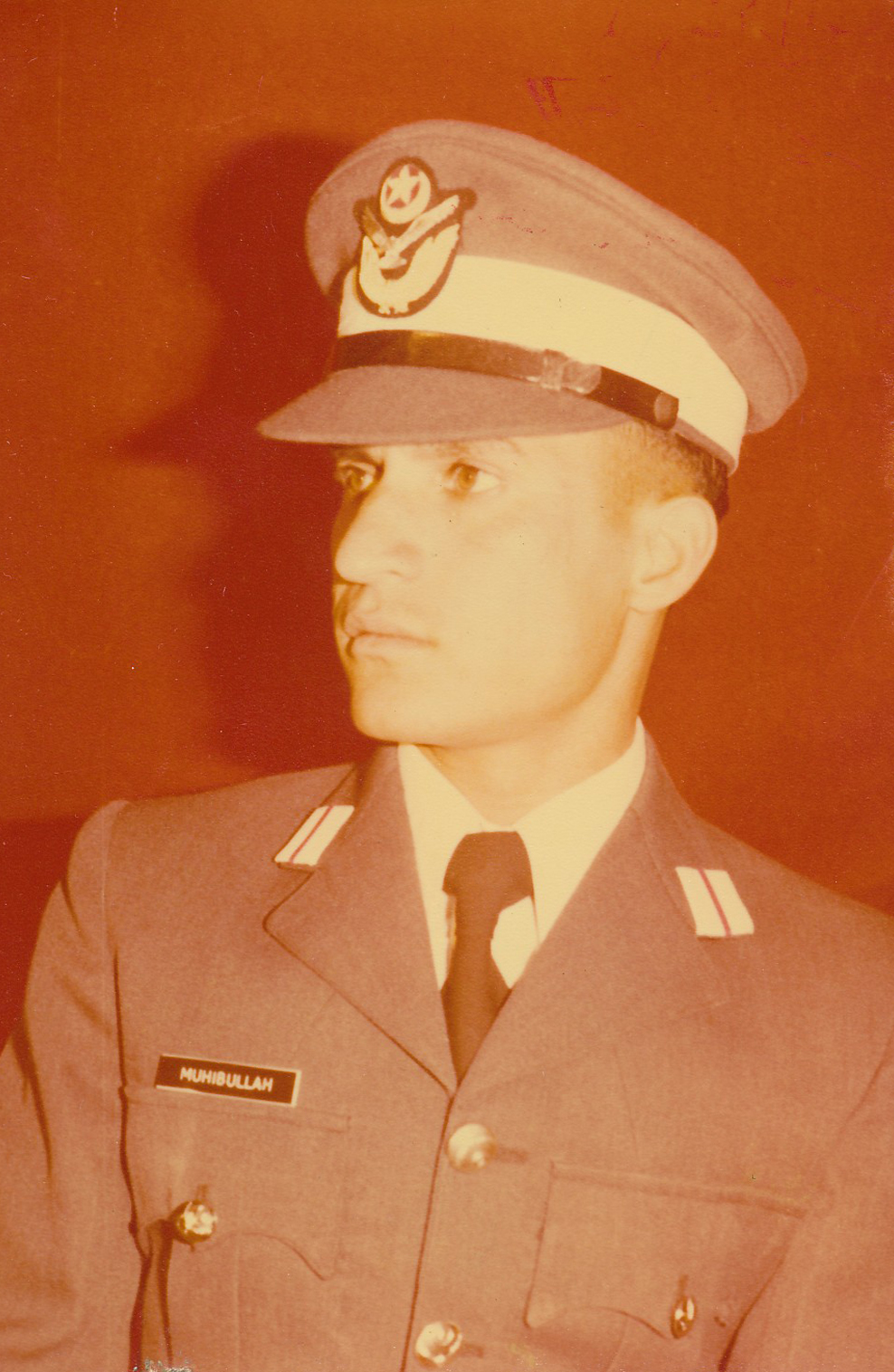
Kakakhel as a flight lieutenant in Pakistan Air Force

Kakakhel spent some time in the Pakistan Air Force as a flight lieutenant before starting his law practice, having already completed his LLB from Karachi University so started his own practice in 1985.

== Founding of Pakistan Aainee Party ==
In 1992, Kakakhel announced the launch of a political party called the Pakistan Aainee Party. He was chosen as its founding President with the duty of upholding the Constitution, the rule and supremacy of law, and independence of judiciary. The party faced challenges from within and outside the country and was dissolved after three years. Kakakhel faced opposition from agencies, establishment, landlords and the ruling junta.

== Challenged military takeover ==
Kakakhel was the first to challenge the military takeover of the country by General Pervez Musharraf. In the case of ex-chief Minister NWFP Sardar Mehtab Ahmed Khan Abbassi vide writ petition No.1 of 2000. The coup was challenged before the Peshawar High Court.

== Presidential candidate ==
Feeling that all the agencies and political parties were helping Musharraf's dictatorial rule and Musharraf was going to be elected unopposed in the forthcoming elections to the office of President of Pakistan, Kakakhel announced his candidature for the post of the President. The candidature was welcomed by almost all the pressure groups including army generals and politicians but then all of a sudden the lawyers' movement started against the removal of the Chief Justice of Pakistan, Iftikhar Muhammad Chaudhry. The lawyers' movement overshadowed the presidential elections and also the candidature of Kakakhel; hence he withdraw his claim to the presidency of the country in the best interests of the country.

Kakakhel also started the Pakistan Jurists' Association in 1990.

In view of the deteriorating peace and security situation in the world and the sufferings and destruction of mankind at its own hands, Kakakhel initiated a new platform to provide the world community with a forum other than U.N.O. to give vent to their feelings and for advancing the cause of humanity to bring peace and security in the world. The forum is called LIPS (Lawyers for International Peace and Security). Lawyers and jurists all along the world will be mobilised towards the path of security for mankind.

The article of Kakakhel, "Prisoner of War's" was published in the Foreign Broadcast Information Service 50th Anniversary and in the Daily Muslim of Pakistan on 17 February 1991.

== Restoration of Members Provincial Assembly ==
He also challenged the fake resignations of the Member Provincial Assembly namely Maulana Dildar Ahmad and Gorsaran Lal in Peshawar High Court and PHC refrained Election Commissioner not to take action against them and successfully restored them. He also restored the then Deputy Speaker of the province of Khyber Pakhtunkhwa, Ikramullah Shahid, but after restoration, he resigned.

== Petition for stopping the dissolution of Provincial Assembly, Khyber Pakhtunkhwa ==
Kakakhel filed the writ to stop the provincial assembly from dissolution but the political parties involved in the Government who did not want to stop the dissolution stole the petition from the box and journalists in response published fake stories regarding the issue.

== Senior Advocate title from Supreme Court of Pakistan ==
He received the title of Senior Advocate from the Supreme Court of Pakistan. It is expressly given in the Supreme Court of Court of Pakistan website in a report by the Registrar Faqir Hussain that since 1947, only 313 advocates of the Supreme Court of Pakistan achieved this title and Kakakhel is said to be the youngest of all. Very few Senior Advocates are practising, mostly because of their old age, involvement in politics or are enjoying their retired life.

== Iraqi shoe thrower incident ==
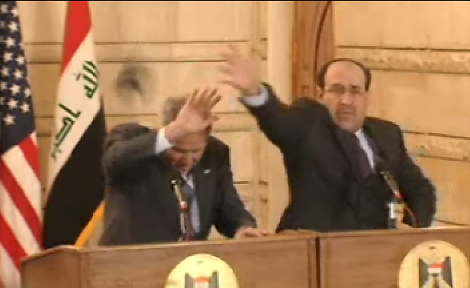
Iraqi shoe thrower incident

Following the incident of throwing a shoe at the then American President George W. Bush, Kakakhel offered and provided services to the accused, Muntadhar al-Zaidi, an Iraqi broadcast journalist.

== Challenged the appointment of Care Taker Chief Minister Khyber Pukhtunkhwa ==
Kakakhel also filed writ petition against Justice (R) Tariq Pervez in Peshawar High Court, Peshawar who was retired on 14 February 2013 and just after his retirement, he was nominated for Care Taker Chief Minister which was violation of Article 207 of the Constitution of Islamic Republic of Pakistan. Previously Judges who took oath contrary to the constitution were removed from the concerned posts or either stopped to take oath by Chief Justice of Pakistan. The case is still pending in the court.

== Recently Successfully Allowed Candidates for General Election Through Court ==
Mr. Kakakhel recently argued dozen of Election Appeal against Returning Officers who are Judges by their own of Lower Judiciary and the appeal lies to High Court concerned of the Territorial Jurisdiction. The candidates includes Yousaf Ayub Khan grand son of General Ayub Khan of Pakistan Tehreek Insaf (PTI) who was also disqualified on the basis that he produced fake degree in 2002 Election and remained in cabinet. Gulzar Khan Former chairman Public Service Commission was also disqualified on the basis that he has not completed 2 years after his retirement but it was clarified in the Court that it was contractual post not a permanent post so he is eligible to contest election from PTI seat from National Assembly "NA-04".

The cases also included minority case of Fredrick Azeem Ghouri of Pakistan Muslim League (Nawaz) who was disqualified as he produced fake degree but never remained in Government. The most interesting case was of Dual Nationality holder which was argued by Mr. Kakakhel that he has relinquished the United States of America Nationality, and the Nationality was acquired for medical treatment. Fortunately, the candidate was Advocate of Swat and remained Member of Provincial Assembly. His almost all organs of the body was operated in United States of America from his own pocket and he is fit to contest elections again. The court also allowed Syed Alla Ud Din to contest General Election from Swat from Pakistan Peoples Party ticket.

== Author of books on law ==
- Constitution of Islamic Republic of Pakistan (four volumes, of 3964 pages). Published by Excellent Publishers, Lahore.
- Words and Phrases (three volumes, more than 6000 pages). Published by Kashmir Law Times, Lahore
- Commentary on the Customs Laws (one volume, more than 800 pages)
- Companies Laws (one volume, more than 2000 pages). Published by Khyber Law Publishers, Lahore.
- The Banking Laws (one volume, 626 pages)
- Laws relating to Maintenance of Public Order.
- Expert on Shahadat (one volume).
- Law relating to cross examination in the trial courts
