= Sayyid Kastir Gul =

Sufi Saint

Rahamkar Sayyid Kastir Gul
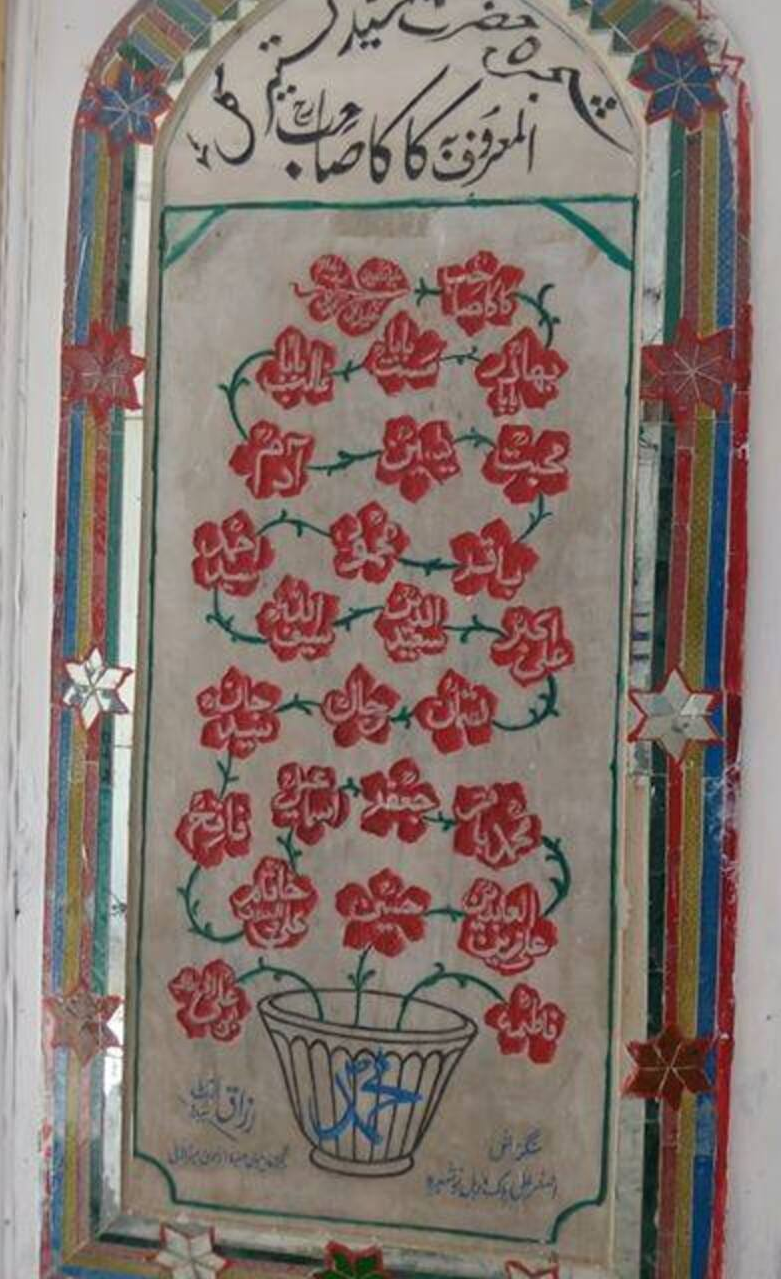
- Family Tree of Sayyid Kastir Gul, the progenitor of Kakakhel tribe

Personal life
- Born: 1573
- Died: 1653 (aged 79–80)
- Occupation: Polymathic scholar, leader of the Kakakhel tribe

Religious life
- Religion: Islam
- Denomination: Sunni
- Jurisprudence: Shafi'i
- Tariqa: Suhrawardi

Muslim leader
- Influenced by: Abdul Qadir Gilani, Bahauddin Naqshband, Jalaluddin Surkh Posh Bukhari, Shahabuddin Suhrawardi
- Influenced: Khushal Khan Khattak

Sayyid Kastir Gul (1573–1653) was an Islamic jurist and Sufi saint who is revered among Afghans and Pakistanis. He was the leader of the Kakakhel tribe. Historically, the Kakakhel tribe played a central role in the defense of the Emirate of Afghanistan against the Sikhs during the 1748–1837 Afghan-Sikh wars, such as in the Battle of Nowshera.

== Birth ==
Sayyid Kastir Gul was born on Friday evening, December 25, 1573, in Kandakhel, Kohsar, Nowshera in present-day Pakistan.

== Biography and character ==
He is known to this day for being an epitome of Islamic asceticism, who was very conspicuous among clerics during his lifetime because of his regular voluntary fasting. Furthermore, he is known for his sermons such as those on the importance of Tahajjud, as well as Islamic etiquette such as decency, qualitative modesty, generosity, and empathy toward fellow human beings. He was a man who was responsible for multiple philanthropic projects, which earned him the title of Rahamkar (benefactor). His philanthropic projects were especially those aimed at improving the quality of living conditions. Sayyid Kastir Gul had five children.

== Students ==
He had a high number of graduates in Islamic law due to his educational projects.

== Bibliography ==
- "Haleem Gul Baba," an article written by Pir Sabaq in the journal Qudsia, from the publishing house Darul Uloom Faiz-ul-Quran in Nowshera.
- "Tazkira Ulema wa Mashaikh Sarhad" (German: Verzeichnis hochgeachteter Kleriker) Volume I, written by Muhammad Amir Shah Qadri, Maktab-ul-Hasan Kocha Aqa Pir Jan Yaka Tut in Peshawar.
