= Kaka Khel =

Coordinates: 32°32′59″N 70°47′44″E

- Union council and town
- Interactive map of Kaka Khel
- Country: Pakistan
- Province: Khyber Pakhtunkhwa
- District: Lakki Marwat District
- Time zone: UTC+5 (PST)

Kaka Khel is a village and union council of Khyber District in Khyber Pakhtunkhwa province of Pakistan. It is located at 32°32'59N 70°47'44E and has an altitude of 307 metres (1010 feet).
