= Battle of Ali Masjid (1672) =

Afghan–Mughal battle in 1672

- Part of the Mughal–Afghan Wars
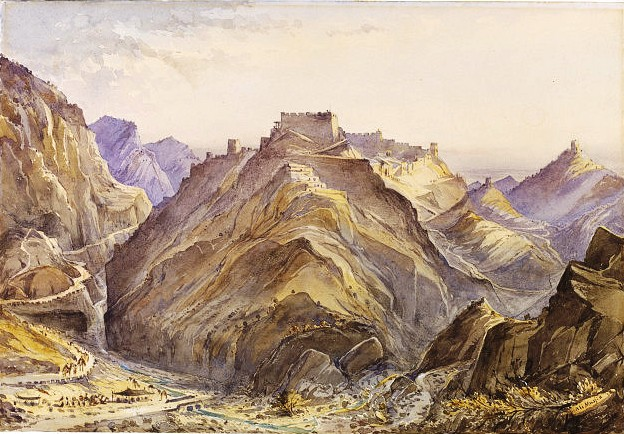
- Ali Masjid Fort
Date	30 April 1672
Location	Ali Masjid, near Landi Kotal, Khyber Pass (present-day Pakistan)
Result	Afghan tribes victory

Belligerents
Afridi tribe Mohmand tribe Shinwari tribe	Mughal Empire

Commanders and leaders
Aimal Khan Mohmand; Darya Khan Afridi; Khushal Khan Khattak	Muhammad Amin; Muhammad Riza †; Mirza Abdullah †; Mirza Sultan †

Strength
10,000	40,000 cavalry 200,000 infantry Total: 240,000

Casualties and losses
Minor	40,000+ killed 20,000+ captured

The Battle of Ali Masjid also known as Battle of Landi Kotal and Battle of Khyber was fought on 30 April 1672 between the Mughal Empire led by Muhammad Amin alongside support from Khushal Khan. The Afghan tribal coalition led by Aimal Khan Mohmand, Darya Khan Afridi, and Shinwari tribesmen. The army of 240,000 Mughal force led by Muhammad Amin suffered a decisive defeat, with over 40,000 soldiers killed and 20,000 taken prisoner.

== Background ==
The Pashtun borderland faced a pivotal moment when a Safi girl was dishonored by the Mughal soldiers, deeply angering the Pashtuns. To avenge this disgrace, a coalition comprising Afridi, Shinwari, Mohmand forces, and the Safi tribal lashkar, first executed the perpetrators and then defeated Hussain Beg, the Mughal faujdar of Kunar. Muhammad Amin, aggrieved by this defeat, sought significant retaliation.

== Battle ==
In April 1672, the Afghan leader Aimal Khan Mohmand, supported by Darya Khan Afridi, declared war against the Mughal Empire. The Mughal governor of Kabul, Muhammad Amin had 40,000 cavalry and 200,000 infantry to advance deep into the mountainous terrain near Peshawar. Once the imperial army was committed to the highlands, the Pathans sealed off all available routes of retreat.

In a coordinated pre-dawn assault, Afghan warriors seized the high ground surrounding the Mughal camp. Their sudden battle cries threw the imperial forces into disarray, and the hillmen then descended upon the confused Mughal soldiers with drawn swords. Muhammad Amin Khan, recognizing the hopelessness of his situation, dispatched a holy man from Balkh to negotiate terms, offering substantial payments and concessions. The Afghans, however, rejected all overtures and killed the envoy before overwhelming the Mughal force entirely.

To preserve his own life, Muhammad Amin Khan ordered his secretary, Muhammad Riza, to take his place atop his elephant. The Afghans, believing Riza to be the commander, killed him and took his head as a trophy. Meanwhile, Muhammad Amin Khan disguised himself in Pathan garb and, aided by Afghan soldiers in his service, made his way to Peshawar under cover of darkness. Even upon reaching the city, he was initially refused entry by the cautious garrison commander, who insisted on verifying his identity by torchlight before opening the gates.

The aftermath was equally devastating for the Mughal camp followers and family members. Most were taken prisoner. Mirza Abdullah, son of Muhammad Amin Khan, killed one of the captive women to prevent her from falling into enemy hands, and was subsequently slain along with Mirza Sultan, the commander's brother-in-law. Among those taken captive were the mother, sister, and daughter of Muhammad Amin Khan. The daughter, who had previously been betrothed to Sultan Akbar, fourth son of Emperor Aurangzeb, saw her marriage prospects dissolved, as the imperial court considered it beneath the dignity of a Mughal prince to wed a woman who had been captured by the Afghans.

In the chaos of the battle, a jewel-box containing some of the most valuable diamonds and gems belonging to the widow of Mir Jumlah was lost. Some accounts suggest that Mahabat Khan, later reappointed as governor of Kabul, may have recovered these valuables, though this was never confirmed.

Muhammad Amin Khan ultimately used his personal treasury at Peshawar to ransom his mother, sister, and daughter from Afghan captivity, giving some indication of the considerable personal wealth he had accumulated during his tenure. Khushal Khan Khattak was attacked by the tribal Pashtuns. The Battle took place on the 30th of April 1672 and the Afghans were under Aimal Khan Mohmand, Darya Khan Afridi and Shinwari tribesmen. Khushal Khan entered the battle on behalf of his Mughal patrons against the Afghan forces, fighting with great determination . Although he was accompanied by a large Mughal force, he was decisively defeated by the Pashtun tribesmen. More than 40,000 Mughal soldiers were killed and over 20,000 were taken prisoner.

== Aftermath ==
Hundreds of Mughal officers were killed, and the governor of Kabul retreated to Peshawar with only a small number of survivors. The daughter, sister and mother of Muhammad Amin were taken as prisoners, but his wife committed suicide. Khushal Khan was still confused if he should be on the side with the Afghans or the Mughals, but would later join the Afghan rebellion in 1673.
