= Khattak =

Pashtun tribe

خټک

Languages
- Pashto

Religion
- Islam

Related ethnic groups
- Bannuzai · Dawar · Wazir · Afridi and other Karlani Pashtun tribes

The Khattak (Pashto: خټک) tribe is a prominent Pashtun tribe located in the Khattak territory, which consists of Karak, Nowshera, Kohat districts of Khyber Pakhtunkhwa, Pakistan.

== History ==
=== Origins ===
Multiple British Raj historians have identified the Khattak with the Satragyddae or Sattagudai, an ancient Indo-Aryan tribe inhabiting Gandhara. The Sattagudai (Ancient Greek: Σατταγύδαι) were a people mentioned by Herodotus in connection to people under the influence of the Achaemenid Empire. According to Herodotus:

The Sattagudai and the Gandarioi and the Dadikai and the Aparutai, who were all reckoned together paid 170 talents.

According to Sir Olaf Caroe:

""Neither Khaṭaks nor Shitaks appear by name until the period of publication of genealogies under the Mughals, and the time of Akbar's dealings with the Khaṭaks for the protection of the highway to Peshawar. Babur indeed in his memoirs mentions the Karranis (Karlanis) whom he encountered in 1505 around Bannu along with the Niazis and Isakhel. It is probable that this reference of his is to Khattaks or Shitaks (Banuchis), or both, for both are Karlani tribes, and the other Karlanis who live in that area, Wazirs and Bangash, Babur mentions by name when he comes to them."

In Nimatullah's 1620 work History of The Afghans, the Khattaks are amongst the oldest of the Afghan tribes.

== Khushal Khan Khattak ==
A warrior poet by the name of Khushal Khan Khattak (1613–1690) was once the chief of this tribe, and his contributions to Pashto literature are considered as classic texts. His life and times are one of the most chronicled and discussed subjects in Pashtun history, as he was active on the political, social and intellectual fora of his times. He was a most voluminous writer, and composed no less than three hundred and sixty literary works, both in the Pashto and Persian languages.

His poetry revolves around concepts of Pakhtunwali; Honour, Justice, Bravery and Nationalism and his works have been translated into numerous languages, English and Urdu being the primary ones.

== Notables ==
- Khushal Khan Khattak (1603–1689), A Pashtun tribal leader, poet, warrior who had organised tribes to fight against the Mughal Empire
- Malak Akora Khattak, Chief of Khattak tribe, great grandfather of Khushal Khattak
- Sami al Haq - (1937–2018), Regarded as the "Father of the Taliban"
- Pervez Khattak, (1950) 22nd Chief Minister of Khyber Pakhtunkhwa Pakistan and current Minister of Defence of Pakistan
- Ajmal Khattak, (1925–2010) in Akora Khattak was a Pakistani politician, writer, Pashto poet, Khudai Khidmatgar, former President of Awami National Party
- Ghulam Faruque Khan (1899–1990) was a dynamic bureaucrat, politician, and industrialist of Pakistan. He belonged to the village Shaidu (Khan Khel) in Nowshera District. His contribution to Pakistan's industrial development he is sometimes described as "The Goliath who Industrialized Pakistan".
- Pareshan Khattak, (b. 10 December 1931 - d. 16 April 2009) from Karak Pakistan. His real name was Ghamay jan khattak "Pashto" پښتو" غمے جان خټک", he was a former Vice-Chancellor, Pashto poet and writer and former Chairman University Grants Commission of Pakistan. His books titled “Pukhtana Kochay,” “Dozakhi Pakhto,” “Drana Pukhtana,”
- Raj Wali Shah Khattak, Pashto language poet
- Masood Sharif Khan Khattak, Director-General of the Intelligence Bureau of Pakistan
- Shahid Ahmad Khattak, Member of National Assembly
- Afrasiab Khattak, Socialist Politician and former Communist Party of Pakistan member who was aligned with the Afghan PDPA in the 1980s
- Nasrullah Khan Khattak, Pakistani Politician and Chief Minister of the North-West Frontier Province
- Yusuf Khattak, Pakistani left-wing intellectual Politician, Pakistan Movement Activist, Federal Minister and statesman who represented Pakistan internationally
- Habibullah Khan Khattak, British Indian army officer who fought in the Burma Campaign during the Second World War and post-independence promoted as a Three Star rank Pakistan Army General, Minister and Industrialist

== See also ==
- List of Khattaks
- Pashtun
- Pashtun culture
- Zazi
- Khattak dance
- Battle of Langarkot
