= Khushal Khattak =

Pashtun poet, chief and warrior (1613–1689)

Khushal Khan Khattak خوشال خان خټک خوشحال‌خان ختک
- Portrait of Khattak
- Born: May or June 1613; Akora Khattak, Mughal Empire (present-day Nowshera District, Khyber Pakhtunkhwa, Pakistan)
- Died: 19 February 1689 (aged 75); Dambara, Tirah, Mughal Empire (present-day Khyber District, Khyber Pakhtunkhwa, Pakistan)
- Resting place: Akora Khattak, Nowshera District, Khyber Pakhtunkhwa, Pakistan
- Known for: Pashto poetry, Pashtun nationalism
- Notable work: Bāznāma, Swātnāma, Fazlnāma, Tibbnāma, Firāqnāma
- Title: National poet of Afghanistan
- Parent: Shahbaz Khan Khattak
- Military career
- Conflicts: Mughal Central Asia Campaign; Battle of Ali Masjid (1672); Battle of Nowshera (1674); Battle of Gumbat; Battle of Langarkot; Battle of Dodah

Khushal Khan Khattak (Central Pashto: خوشال خان خټک;1613 – 20 February 1689), (Note: Khošāl Khān Khaṭak) also known as Khushal Baba (Pashto: خوشال بابا), was a 17th-century Pashtun poet, chief, and warrior. Khushal Khan and his family had served the Mughal Empire for generations, protecting them from Pashtun tribes over most of his lifespan. After being expelled from his tribal chiefdom and replaced with his son by his Mughal superiors, Khushal Khan turned against the Mughals. Afterwards, Khushal preached the union of all Pashtuns, and encouraged revolt against the Mughal Empire, promoting Pashtun nationalism in the last years of his life through poetry. Much of Khushal's poetry is in Pashto but some is also in Persian. Khushal is considered the "father of Pashto literature" and the national poet of Afghanistan.

Khushal's life was spent in serving the Mughal emperor and in his last years he fought against the Mughal Empire who had fluctuating relations with the Pashtuns of Khyber Pakhtunkhwa (in present-day Pakistan) and Zabulistan (present-day Afghanistan). In order to restore his position as chief, Khushal challenged the powers of the Mughal emperor Aurangzeb and defeated the Mughal troops in many engagements. After conflict with his son Bahram, Khushal went into exile in 1681 in the Afridi territory.

He was a renowned warrior who became known as a "Pashtun warrior-poet". The stand and fight attitude of Khushal was an important stance in Pashtun history, and his opinions and ideas form a new stage in the ideological and intellectual development of the Pashtuns. Although he harboured sentiments against the Roshani movement of Pir Roshan, he admired prose and poetic works of its adherents and was influenced by literary styles of Roshani poets. He wrote on a wide range of topics, and especially on Pashtunwali. Besides poetry and prose works, Khushal also wrote various translations from Persian and Arabic into Pashto. He later died in Tirah (in present-day Khyber District of Pakistan).

== Early life ==
Khushal was born in or about 1613 in the Khattak tribe of the Pashtun people. He was the son of Malik Shahbaz Khattak from Akora, in the Mughal Empire (now in Nowshera District, Khyber Pakhtunkhwa, Pakistan). His grandfather, Malik Akoray, was the first Khattak to enjoy patronage during the reign of the Mughal emperor Akbar and was granted a jagir. Akoray moved from Teri (a village in Karak District) to Sarai Akora, the town which Akoray founded and built.

He was an intelligent and bold person from childhood. His first involvement in war occurred when he was just 13 years old. Apart from the fact that he was a scholar, thinker, philosopher and boisterous poet he was a prince and leaders of his tribe simultaneously. His forefathers were since the 16th century officers of the Mughal Empire. After the death of his father Shahbaz Khan Khattak, emperor Shah Jehan appointed him as the tribal chief and Mansabdar in 1641 at the age of 28. After the death of Shah Jahan his relations with Aurangzeb deteriorated. Aurangzeb arrested Khushal. In 1658, Aurangzeb, Shah Jehan's successor, threw him away as a prisoner in the Gwalior fortress.

Khushal followed the Sufi Saint Sayyid Kastir Gul, known as Sheikh Rahamkar or Kaka Sahib and was trained by him in islamic sciences.

Shortly before Sayyid Kastir Gul died, he issued the following will of his:

“in this age, no one can be as pious and virtuous as Khushal

Khan is. I would like him to give me the final ritual bath and

bury me with his own hands if it is possible for him.”:

Khushal substantiated Pashtun Nationalism, hinting that the Pashtuns were blessed with the shrine of "The Kaka", meaning Sayyid Kastir in their land and that the decrets of Kaka Sahib shall be regarded as law abiding on all Pashtuns. In honor of his master Sayyid Kastir Gul, he centered his revolution at the shrine of Sayyid Kastir and announced assemblies (Jirgas) there. Sayyid Kastir´s descendants, the Kaka Khel were given much influence.

Khushal´s daughter married Sayyid Ziauddin Shaheed, the son of Sayyid Kastir Gul.

== Rebellion against the Mughal Empire ==
After his father's death, Mughal Emperor Shah Jahan appointed him as the tribal chief and Mansabdar in 1641 at the age of 28. The Mughal king Shah Jahan appreciated his principality. Then Aurangzeb (the son of Shah Jahan) imprisoned his father and ordered the beheading of his brothers; so he made his way to the throne. Aurangzeb arrested Khushal In 1658. He threw him away as a prisoner in the Rathambore fortress. There he had as a prisoner or later and-Delhi-spent under detention in the mountains prison. He later release from captivity in 1668. After Khushal was permitted to return to the Pashtun dominated areas, Khushal had been deadly shocked by the unfriendly treatment, he received from Mughal authorities and king Aurangzeb whose indifference and coolness towards his plight had wounded Khushal's ego. He used to say, "I had done nothing wrong against the interests of the king or the empire". Mughal authorities continued to offer him with temptations in order to reclaim him to their service but Khushal resisted all such offers and made it clear to the Mughals that "I served your cause to the best of my honesty, I subdued and killed my own Pashtuns to promote the Empire's interests but my services and my loyalty did not make me a Mughal". According to Khushal, he was burning from inside for exacting revenge but preferred to keep silent. Nevertheless, the Mughals were not inclined to bear his aloofness and therefore he was challenged either "to be friend or foe" as the interests of empire knew no impartiality. Khushal decided to be a foe and joined Darya Khan Afridi and Aimal Khan Mohmand in their fight and wars against Mughals. He dissociated himself from the Mughal Empire slowly and started with his resistance later, he incited the Afghan tribes to rebel against the Mughal Emperor Aurangzeb. He took contact to other Pashtoon tribes and with support of his people he started a systematic resistance against the Mughals.

After the revolt of the Paashtuns spread, with the Mughals suffering a near total collapse of their authority along the Pashtun belt. The closure of the important Attock-to-Kabul trade route along the Grand Trunk road was particularly critical. By 1674, the situation had deteriorated to a point where Aurangzeb himself camped at Attock to personally take charge. Switching to diplomacy and bribery along with force of arms, the Mughals eventually split the rebellion and while they never managed to wield effective authority outside the main trade route, the revolt was partially suppressed. However, the long term anarchy on the Mughal frontier that prevailed as a consequence ensured that Nader Shah's Khorasanian forces half a century later faced little resistance on the road to Delhi.

== Death and tribute ==
After failing to unite the Pashtun tribes, Khushal retired as a warrior and focused on writing. Upon his retirement, his 57 sons began fighting for leadership. Meanwhile, the Mughals had bribed his son Behram Khan to arrest or to kill Khushal. Bahram joined forces with Mughals set to capture his father, and before he could do so, Khushal Khan fled into Afridi territory in Tirah assisted by his two sons Nusrat Khan and Gohar Khan. Khushal died at the age of 76 on Friday, 20 February 1689 at Dambara. People searched for him and found his dead body a number of days later with his sword and the carcass of his horse (known as "Silai" in Pashto, which means Wind).

He desired before his death that he should be buried in a place where "the dust of Mughal horses' hoofs may not fall on his grave." His wishes were carried out by his friend and his remains were laid at 'Chashmai' village in the Akora Khattak in Khattaks hills, where many Pashtuns continue to pay tribute and visit his tomb. His grave carries the inscription: "Da Afghan Pa nang mai watarala toora, nangyalai da zamanai Khushal Khattak Yam" (trans.: "I have taken up the sword to defend the pride of the Afghan, I am Khushal Khattak, the honorable man of the age.")

Allama Muhammad Iqbal, the national poet of Pakistan, he commends Khushal in these words:

I am tribal and am lost in the unity of nation. To elevate the name of Afghans I love these young people who puts the halter on stars This son of mountains is never less than the Mughals O'companion! May I tell you the secrets of my heart?

Khushal Khan likes that grave where the dust of Mughal's horse's boots could not fall.

== Published works ==
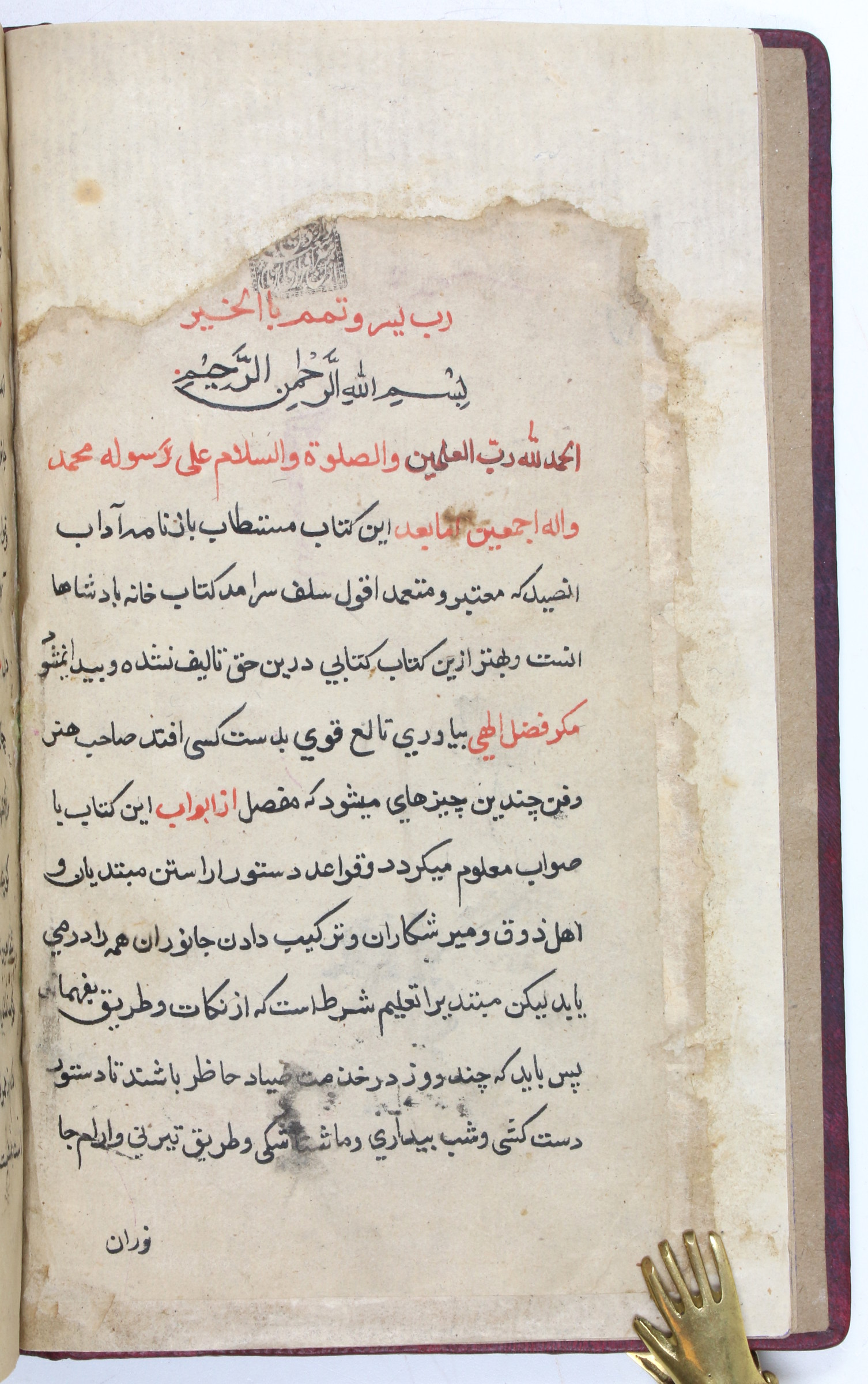
Early manuscript of Khushal Khan's Baz-nama [The Book of Falconry], dated 1689-1690. This particular manuscript was written within a year of Khushal Khan's death

Khushal's poetry consists of more than 45,000 poems. According to some historians, the number of books written by Khattak are 260. His more famous books are Bāz-nāma, a manual of falconry, Swāt-nāma, a description of a journey to the beautiful Swat Valley, Fazl-nāma, a handbook on religious and social duties, Tibb-nāma, a book on homely medicinal recipes, Farrukh-nāma, a dialogue between the pen and the sword, and Firāq-nāma, a lament of his separation from his homeland during captivity. Khushal also wrote many ghazals in Persian under the pen-name Rūhī, and a Persian qasida on the futility of the world.

H. G. Raverty was the first translator of Khattak into English; Selections from the Poetry of Afghans (1862, Kolkata) has ninety eight poetic pieces. This was followed by Biddulph's translation Selections from the Poetry of Khushhal Khan Khattak in 1890 published in London. Evelyn Howell and Olaf Caroe jointly translated and published The Poems of Khushhal Khan Khatak in 1963, from the University of Peshawar. Another translation was that by Dr N. Mackenzie Poems from the Diwan of Khushhal Khan Khattak published from London in 1965.

Dost Mohammad Khan Kamil was the first Pashtun scholar to initiate research on Khattak along scientific lines. He wrote two important and comprehensive books, one in English called On a Foreign Approach to Khushhal and the other in Urdu titled Khushhal Khan Khattak published in 1952. Diwan-i-Khushhal Khan Khattak was published under the directive of H .W. Bellew in 1869 (Jail Press, Peshawar), the manuscript of which was provided by Sultan Bakhash Darogha, an employee of the British government. More recently his poetry has been translated again.

In October 2002, a book on Khushal, Khushal Khan, The Afghan Warrior Poet and Philosopher, was published. It is sponsored by Pashtun Cultural Society and Pashto Adabi Society of Islamabad/Rawalpindi. The book is written by a well-known writer and scholar, Ghani Khan Khattak, who is reputed for having established the literary and cultural societies, and for promoting Pashto literary and cultural activities in the capital of Pakistan, Islamabad. The significance of the book lies in that this is the first book in English on Khushal. Most of the written material available on Khattak is either in Pashto, Persian or Urdu. Although orientalists have always given importance to Khattak in their findings but they have not ever presented a detailed life story of Khushal Khan.

Ghani Khan Khattak has also authored three more books on the Khan i.e. in Urdu, Pashto and another in English, an improved version on his previous book "Khushal Khan Afghan warrior Poet and Philosopher." The book in Urdu, published in 2009 i.e. خوشحال خان افغان قومی شاعر و فلاسفر gives extensive coverage to the Khushal's philosophical thoughts. The author's Pashto book خوشحال دَ ننګيال او سردار په لټون کښې deals with his thoughts on ننګيال, the Hero and سردار, the Sovereign. The book was published in 2011. In his recent attempt on Khushal, "Khushal, life, thoughts and contemporary Pakhtuns," published in March 2014 is aimed at giving projection to the time and life of the great Khan for the benefit of English readers in Afghanistan, Pakistan and beyond.

=== Poetry ===
- Diwan (consisting of nearly 16000 couplets)
- Sahat u Badan: A long verse deals with pathology of human body.
- Tib Nama
- Fazal Nama: Deals with religious proposition.
- Swat Nama: Narration of his visit to Swat Valley.
- Farrukh Nama: A dialogue between Pen and Sword.
- Faraq Nama: Narration of the days in Mughal internment and exile.
- Swat Nama

Baaznamaa

=== Prose ===
- Tarjuma Hadia: Explains various aspects of Fiqha Hanafia.
- Aaina: A Pashto translation of an Arabic book on Fiqha.
- Baiaz: Memories of life.
- Zanziri: Deals with the principles of shorthand.
- Dastar Nama: about how a leader should act

== Quotes ==
- "The very name Pashtun spells honor and glory; Lacking that honor, what is the Afghan story? In the sword alone lies our deliverance."
- "I despise the man who does not guide his life by honour. The very word "honour" drives me mad."

== Legacy ==
Khushal Khan Khattak University in Karak, Khyber Pakhtunkhwa, named after Khushal Khan Khattak. A train service, the Khushhal Khan Khattak Express, is also named after him.

=== Allama Iqbal ===
Allama Iqbal dedicated a poem titled Khushhal Khan Ki Wasiyat to him. Toward the end of his life, Iqbal became appreciative of his work to the extent of supporting his struggle against Mughal emperor Aurangzeb, that he once eulogized, writing in a letter that Khushal "was a versatile mind and he wrote on various subjects, such as poetry, philosophy, ethics, medicine" and that "throughout his poetry, the major portion of which was written in India, and during his struggles with the Mughals, breathes the spirit of early Arabian poetry - we find in it the same love of freedom and war, the same criticism of life."

== See also ==
- Nazo Tokhi
- Rahman Baba
- Ahmad Shah Durrani
- Nowshera district
- Battle of langarkot
- Battle of Dodah
