= List of chief ministers of Khyber Pakhtunkhwa =

Sohail Khan Afridi

Chief Minister of Khyber Pakhtunkhwa
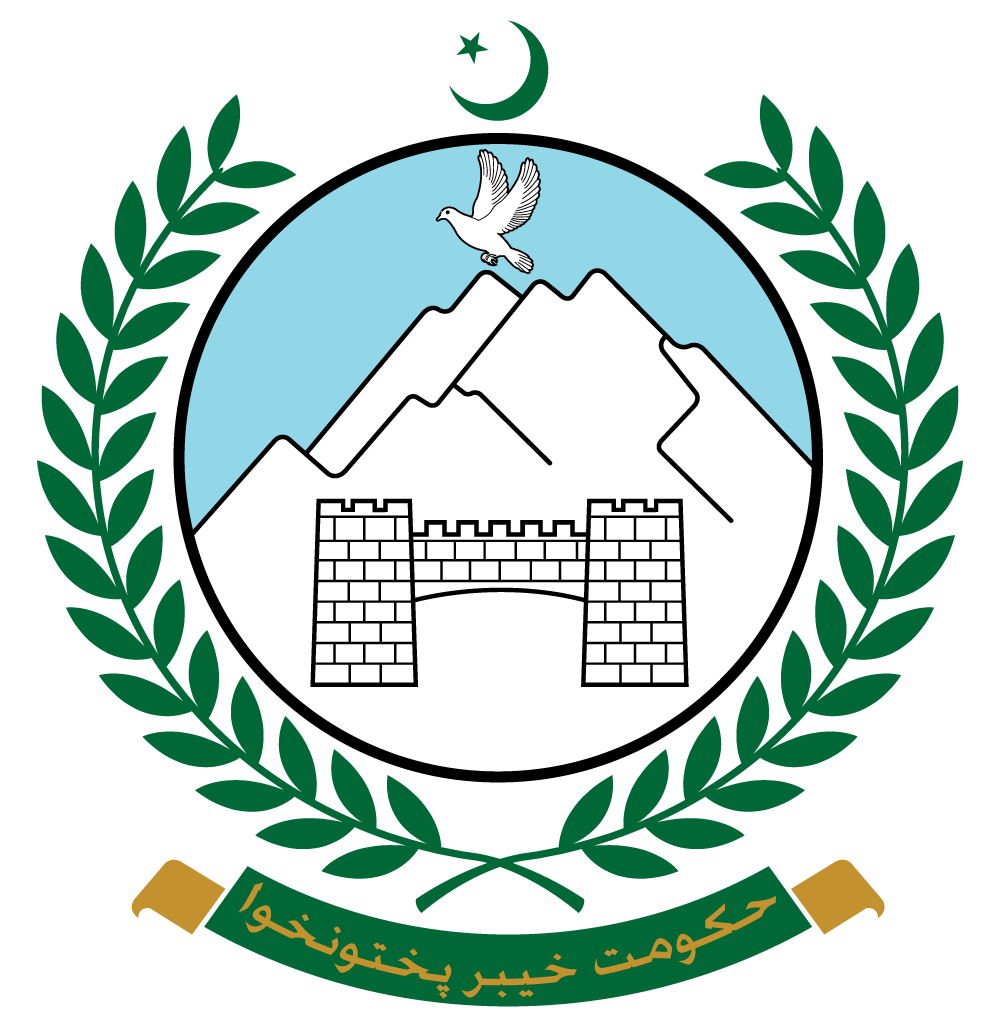
- Seal of the Government of Khyber Pakhtunkhwa
- Incumbent; Governor's rule since 11 October 2026
- Member of: Provincial Assembly of Khyber Pakhtunkhwa
- Appointer: Provincial Assembly of Khyber Pakhtunkhwa
- Term length: Five years
- Inaugural holder: Sahibzada Abdul Qayyum
- Formation: April 1, 1937; 89 years ago

The chief minister of Khyber Pakhtunkhwa is the head of the Government of Khyber Pakhtunkhwa. It is elected by the Provincial Assembly of Khyber Pakhtunkhwa for a maximum of five years.

== List of chief ministers of Khyber Pakhtunkhwa ==
United Muslim Nationalist Party Indian National Congress All-India Muslim League Pakistan Muslim League Jamiat Ulema-e-Islam Pakistan Peoples Party Independent Islami Jamhoori Ittehad Pakistan Muslim League (N) Awami National Party Pakistan Tehreek-e-Insaf Caretaker Governor's rule, martial law or office abolished

| Tenure no. | Chief minister | | Party | Term of office | | | Ref. |
| Tenure no. | Portrait | Name | Party | Took office | Left office | Time in office | Ref. |
|---|---|---|---|---|---|---|---|
| 1 | | Sahibzada Abdul Qayyum | United Muslim Nationalist Party | April 1, 1937 | September 7, 1937 | 159 days | |
| 2 | | Khan Abdul Jabbar Khan (first tenure) | INC | September 7, 1937 | November 10, 1939 | 2 years, 64 days | |
| – | Governor's rule | | | November 10, 1939 | May 25, 1943 | 3 years, 196 days | |
| 3 | | Sardar Aurang Zeb Khan | All-India Muslim League | May 25, 1943 | March 16, 1945 | 1 year, 295 days | |
| 4 | | Khan Abdul Jabbar Khan (second tenure) | INC | March 16, 1945 | August 22, 1947 | 2 years, 159 days | |
| 5 | | Abdul Qayyum Khan Kashmiri | PML | August 23, 1947 | April 23, 1953 | 5 years, 243 days | |
| 6 | | Sardar Abdur Rashid Khan | PML | April 23, 1953 | July 18, 1955 | 2 years, 86 days | |
| 7 | | Sardar Bahadur Khan | PML | July 19, 1955 | October 14, 1955 | 87 days | |
| – | Office abolished Province incorporated into West Pakistan | | | October 14, 1955 | June 30, 1970 | 14 years, 259 days | |
| – | Office vacant under martial-law administration | | | July 1, 1970 | February 29, 1972 | 1 year, 243 days | |
| 8 | Mufti Mahmud with Sheikh Mujibur Rahman | Mufti Mahmud | JUI | March 1, 1972 | February 15, 1973 | 351 days | |
| 9 | Portrait of Inayatullah Khan Gandapur | Sardar Inayatullah Khan Gandapur | PPP | April 29, 1973 | February 16, 1975 | 1 year, 293 days | |
| – | Governor's rule | | | February 16, 1975 | May 3, 1975 | 76 days | |
| 10 | | Nasrullah Khan Khattak | PPP | May 3, 1975 | April 9, 1977 | 1 year, 341 days | |
| 11 | | Muhammad Iqbal Khan Jadoon | PPP | April 9, 1977 | July 5, 1977 | 87 days | |
| – | Martial-law administration | | | July 5, 1977 | April 7, 1985 | 7 years, 276 days | |
| 12 | | Arbab Jehangir Khan | Independent | April 7, 1985 | May 31, 1988 | 3 years, 54 days | |
| – | Portrait of Fazle Haq | Fazle Haq (caretaker) | Caretaker | May 31, 1988 | December 2, 1988 | 185 days | |
| 13 | Portrait of Aftab Ahmad Sherpao | Aftab Ahmad Sherpao (first tenure) | PPP | December 2, 1988 | August 7, 1990 | 1 year, 248 days | |
| 14 | | Mir Afzal Khan | IJI | August 7, 1990 | July 19, 1993 | 2 years, 346 days | |
| – | | Mufti Muhammad Abbas (caretaker) | Caretaker | July 20, 1993 | October 20, 1993 | 92 days | |
| 15 | | Pir Sabir Shah | PML(N) | October 20, 1993 | February 25, 1994 | 128 days | |
| – | Governor's rule | | | February 25, 1994 | April 24, 1994 | 58 days | |
| 16 | Portrait of Aftab Ahmad Sherpao | Aftab Ahmad Sherpao (second tenure) | PPP | April 24, 1994 | November 12, 1996 | 2 years, 202 days | |
| – | Portrait of Raja Sikander Zaman | Raja Sikander Zaman (caretaker) | Caretaker | November 12, 1996 | February 21, 1997 | 101 days | |
| 17 | Portrait of Mehtab Ahmed Khan | Mehtab Ahmed Khan | PML(N) | February 21, 1997 | October 12, 1999 | 2 years, 233 days | |
| – | Governor's rule and military administration | | | October 12, 1999 | November 30, 2002 | 3 years, 49 days | |
| 18 | | Akram Khan Durrani | JUI(F) | November 30, 2002 | October 11, 2007 | 4 years, 315 days | |
| – | | Shamsul Mulk (caretaker) | Caretaker | October 11, 2007 | March 31, 2008 | 172 days | |
| 19 | Portrait of Haider Khan Hoti | Haider Khan Hoti | ANP | March 31, 2008 | March 20, 2013 | 4 years, 354 days | |
| – | | Imran Ahmed Khan Niazi (caretaker) | Caretaker | March 20, 2013 | May 31, 2013 | 72 days | |
| 20 | Portrait of Pervez Khattak | Pervez Khattak | PTI | May 31, 2013 | June 6, 2018 | 5 years, 6 days | |
| – | | Dost Muhammad Khan (caretaker) | Caretaker | June 6, 2018 | August 16, 2018 | 71 days | |
| 21 | Portrait of Mahmood Khan | Mahmood Khan | PTI | August 17, 2018 | January 21, 2023 | 4 years, 157 days | |
| – | | Muhammad Azam Khan (caretaker) | Caretaker | January 21, 2023 | November 11, 2023 | 294 days | |
| – | | Arshad Hussain Shah (caretaker) | Caretaker | November 12, 2023 | March 1, 2024 | 110 days | |
| 22 | Portrait of Ali Amin Gandapur | Ali Amin Gandapur | PTI | March 2, 2024 | October 14, 2025 | 1 year, 226 days | |
| 23 | Portrait of Sohail Afridi | Sohail Afridi | PTI | October 15, 2025 | October 11, 2026 | 361 days | |

== See also ==
- List of prime ministers of Pakistan
- List of presidents of Pakistan
- Chief Secretary Khyber Pakhtunkhwa
- List of chief ministers of Punjab
- List of chief ministers of Sindh
- List of chief ministers of Balochistan
