= Khaliq-ur-Rehman =

Politician in Pakistan

Khaleeq-ur-Rehman Khattak

Provincial Minister of Health for Khyber Pakhtunkhwa
- Incumbent
- Assumed office 31 October 2025

Provincial Minister of Excise, Taxation & Narcotics Control for Khyber Pakhtunkhwa
- In office 7 March 2024 – 13 October 2025

Member of the Khyber Pakhtunkhwa Assembly
- Incumbent
- Assumed office 29 February 2024
- Constituency: PK-87 Nowshera-III
- In office 13 August 2018 – 18 January 2023
- Constituency: PK-12 (Nowshera-V)
- In office 29 May 2013 – 28 May 2018
- Constituency: PK-65 (Nowshera-V)

Personal details
- Born: 9 July 1977 (age 48) Nowshera, Nowshera District, Pakistan
- Party: PTI (2013-present)
- Occupation: Politician

Khaleeq Ur Rehman Khattak (born 9 July 1977) is a Pakistani politician who is an experienced member of the Provincial Assembly of Khyber Pakhtunkhwa representing the Pakistan Tehreek-e-Insaf (PTI) from PK-87 Nowshera-III. He served as Provincial Minister of Excise, Taxation & Narcotics Control for Khyber Pakhtunkhwa in the Gandapur ministry. He hails from Dag Ismail Kheil, Pabbi, Nowshera.

He won three consecutive elections in 2013, 2018 and 2024 under the constituencies of PK-12, PK 65 and PK-87 Nowshera defeating a prominent ANP Leader Mian Iftikhar Hussain and prominent PTI-P Leader Pervez Khattak. He served as Advisor to the Chief Minister on Excise and Taxation in 2021 and additionally has overseen the Ministry of Higher Education and Department of Food.

== Political career ==
=== Electoral history ===
Khaliq-ur-Rehman entered politics in 2006 and unsuccessfully contested in the 2008 Pakistani general election. He is a three-time MPA in the Provincial Assembly of Khyber Pakhtunkhwa, having served from 2013 to 2018 after his successful election from PK-12 Nowshera in the 2013 Khyber Pakhtunkhwa provincial election as a PTI candidate, while also serving from 2018 to 2023 after his election victory from PK-65 Nowshera in the 2018 Khyber Pakhtunkhwa provincial election as a PTI candidate. He then successfully was elected as an Independent PTI-backed candidate from PK-87 Nowshera-III after gaining 44,762 votes and defeating PTI-P Leader Pervez Khattak, who received 18,176.

=== Provincial Minister ===
He served as Parliamentary Secretary Planning & Development Department in 2013. In his second tenure he was appointed as Advisor to the Chief Minister for Higher Education Department in 2020. In the same year he was made Advisor to the Chief Minister on Food Department. In 2021, he was appointed Advisor to the Chief Minister on Excise, Taxation and Narcotics Control Department.

==== Minister of Excise, Taxation & Narcotics Control (2024-2025) ====
Following his election victory in 2024, he was inducted into the PTI cabinet of Chief Minister Ali Amin Gandapur as Minister of Excise, Taxation & Narcotics Control. During his tenure, he supported the Drug Free Peshawar initiative by allocating a total of 320 Million Pakistani rupees for drug rehabilitation in efforts to control illegal narcotics. He also decided to impose taxes on road development and use for vehicles to increase tax revenue for Khyber Pakhtunkhwa. In order to do so, Khaliq stated that online registration of vehicles would begin and the Excise Department issued a universal number plate.
