= NA-34 Nowshera-II =

Constituency of the National Assembly of Pakistan

- Constituency for the National Assembly of Pakistan
- Region: Cherat Cantonment Pabbi Tehsil and Nowshera Tehsil (partly) of Nowshera District
- Electorate: 452,745

Current constituency
- Party: Pakistan Tehreek-e-Insaf
- Member: Zulfiqar Ali
- Created from: NA-26 Nowshera-II

NA-34 Nowshera-II (این اے-34، نوشہرہ-٢) is a constituency for the National Assembly of Pakistan. The constituency was formerly known as NA-5 Nowshera-I from 1977 to 2018. The name changed to NA-26 (Nowshera-II) after the delimitation in 2018 and to NA-34 Nowshera-II after the delimitation in 2022.

== Members of Parliament ==
=== 1972-1977: NA-3 Peshawar-III ===
Election	Member	Party
1972	Khan Abdul Wali Khan	NAP-W
1977	Aftab Sherpao	PPP

=== 1985–2002: NA-4 Peshawar-IV ===
Election	Member	Party
1985	Maulana Abdul Haq	Independent
1988	Mian Muzaffar Shah	PPP
1990	Ajmal Khattak	ANP
1993	Naseerullah Babar	PPP
1997	Wali Muhammad Khan	ANP

=== 2002–2018: NA-5 Nowshera-I ===
Election	Member	Party
2002	Qazi Hussain Ahmed	MMA
2008	Muhammad Tariq Khattak	PPPP
2013	Pervez Khattak	PTI
2013 By-election	Imran Khattak	PTI

=== 2018–2023: NA-26 Nowshera-II ===
Election	Member	Party
2018	Imran Khattak	PTI

=== 2024-present: NA-34 Nowshera-II ===
Election	Member	Party
2024	Zulfiqar Ali	PTI

== Elections since 2002 ==
=== 2002 general election ===
2002 General Election: NA-5 (Nowshera-I)
Party	Candidate	Votes	%	±%
MMA	Qazi Hussain Ahmad	40,879	54.50	
PPPP	Naseer Ullah Khan Babar	22,189	29.58	
ANP	Mian Rashid Ali Shah	11,944	15.92	
Majority		18,690	24.92	
Turnout		75,012	37.41	
MMA gain from ANP				

A total of 2,153 votes were rejected.

=== 2008 general election ===
2008 General Election: NA-5 (Nowshera-I)
Party	Candidate	Votes	%	±%
PPPP	Engineer Muhammad Tariq Khattak	31,907	33.74	+4.16
ANP	Tariq Hameed Khattak	29,572	31.27	+15.35
PML	Mian Yahya Shah Kaka Khel	17,397	18.40	
MMA	Mufti Muhammad Sajjad	9,192	9.72	−44.78
PML-N	Ishtiaq Ahmed Advocate	4,229	4.47	
Independent	Sajid	1,631	1.72	
Independent	Astaghfir Ullah Advocate	642	0.68	
Majority		2,335	2.47	
Turnout		94,570	37.00	−0.41
PPPP gain from MMA				

A total of 2,701 votes were rejected.

=== 2013 general election ===
2013 General Election: NA-5 (Nowshera-I)
Party	Candidate	Votes	%	±%
PTI	Pervez Khattak	70,053	44.86	
ANP	Muhammad Daud Khattak	21,435	13.73	−17.54
JI	Asif Luqman Qazi	19,869	12.72	
JUI-F	Mufti Muhammad Sajjad	14,131	9.05	
PML-N	Pir Zada Nabi Amin	11,648	7.46	+2.99
PPPP	Engineer Muhammad Tariq Khattak	10,171	6.51	−27.23
Independent	Shahzad Ali Khan	5,541	3.55	
Independent	Aziz ud Din	1,005	0.64	
Independent	Amjid Hussain	930	0.60	
TTP	Gul Zali Khan	875	0.56	
Pakistan Patriotic Movement	Iran Bacha	494	0.32	
Majority		48,618	31.13	
Turnout		156,152	49.89	+12.89
PTI gain from PPPP				

A total of 4,521 votes were rejected.

=== 2013 By-election ===
The member elected in the 2013 General Election, Pervez Khattak, decided to vacate this seat. This resulted in a by-election being triggered, which took place on 22 August 2013.

2013 General Election: NA-5 (Nowshera-I)
Party	Candidate	Votes	%	±%
PTI	Imran Khattak	48,043	60.84	+15.98
ANP	Muhammad Daud Khan Khattak	27,569	34.92	+21.19
Independent	Sajid Khan Gammaryani	2,632	3.33	
TTP	Gul Zali Khan	396	0.50	−0.06
Independent	Iqbal Hussain	260	0.33	
Independent	Khan Adil Ghafar Khan Khattak	63	0.08	
Majority		20,474	25.92	
Turnout		78,963	24.62	−25.27
PTI hold		Swing		

=== 2018 general election ===
General elections were held on 25 July 2018.

General election 2018: NA-26 (Nowshera-II)
Party	Candidate	Votes	%	±%
PTI	Imran Khattak	90,256	49.45	
ANP	Jamal Khan Khattak	47,132	25.82	
MMA	Asif Luqman Qazi	22,777	12.48	
Others	Others (six candidates)	22,358	12.25	
Turnout		188,159	49.87	
Total valid votes		182,523	97.00	
Rejected ballots		5,636	3.00	
Majority		43,124	23.63	
Registered electors		377,308		
PTI hold		Swing	N/A	

=== 2024 general election ===
General elections were held on 8 February 2024. Zulfiqar Ali won with 95,704 votes.

General election 2024: NA-34 Nowshera-II
Party	Candidate	Votes	%	±%
PTI	Zulfiqar Ali (Note: Filed nomination papers as PTI candidate but ECP allowed him to run as an Independent)	95,704	45.98	▼3.46
PTI-P	Imran Khattak	32,732	15.72	N/A
JUI (F)	Pervaiz Khan Khattak	26,058	12.52	N/A
ANP	Mian Babar Shah Kaka Khel	22,481	10.80	▼15.02
Others	Others (fourteen candidates)	31,181	14.98	
Turnout		213,429	47.14	▼2.73
Total valid votes		208,156	97.53	
Rejected ballots		5,273	2.47	
Majority		62,972	30.25	▲6.62
Registered electors		452,745		

== See also ==
- NA-33 Nowshera-I
- NA-35 Kohat
