= Mian Muhammad Umar =

Pakistani politician

Member of the Provincial Assembly of Khyber Pakhtunkhwa
- Incumbent
- Assumed office 29 February 2024
- Constituency: PK-88 Nowshera-IV

Personal details
- Born: Nowshera District, Khyber Pakhtunkhwa, Pakistan
- Political party: PTI (2021-present)
- Parent: Mian Jamshed Uddin Kakakhel (father)

Mian Muhammad Omar is a Pakistani politician from Nowshera District. He is currently serving as a member of the Provincial Assembly of Khyber Pakhtunkhwa since February 2024.

== Career ==
He contested a 2021 by-election from PK-63 Nowshera-III as a candidate of Pakistan Tehreek-e-Insaf (PTI), but was unsuccessful. He received 17,023 votes and was defeated by Ikhtiar Wali Khan, a candidate of Pakistan Muslim League (N) (PML(N)).

He contested the 2024 Khyber Pakhtunkhwa provincial election as an PTI-backed independent candidate from PK-88 Nowshera-IV. He secured 38384 votes. His runner-up was Ahad Khattak of JUI-F who secured 12071 votes.
