= Nafeesa Inayatullah Khan Khattak =

Pakistani politician

Member of the National Assembly of Pakistan
- In office 13 August 2018 – 25 January 2023
- Constituency: Reserved seat for women
- In office 1 June 2013 – 31 May 2018
- Constituency: Reserved seat for women

Personal details
- Party: PTI (2018-present)
- Relatives: Pervez Khattak (brother-in-law); Liaquat Khan Khattak (brother in law)

Nafeesa Inayatullah Khan Khattak (Urdu: نفیسہ عنایت اﷲ خان خٹک) is a Pakistani politician who had been a member of the National Assembly of Pakistan, from August 2018 till January 2023. Previously she was a member of the National Assembly from June 2013 to May 2018.

== Education ==
She has received matriculation education.

== Political career ==
She was elected to the National Assembly of Pakistan as a candidate of Pakistan Tehreek-e-Insaf (PTI) on a reserved seat for women from Khyber Pakhtunkhwa in the 2013 Pakistani general election.

She was re-elected to the National Assembly as a candidate of PTI on a reserved seat for women from Khyber Pakhtunkhwa in the 2018 Pakistani general election.
