= Dak Ismail Khel =

Coordinates: 33°51′N 71°49′E

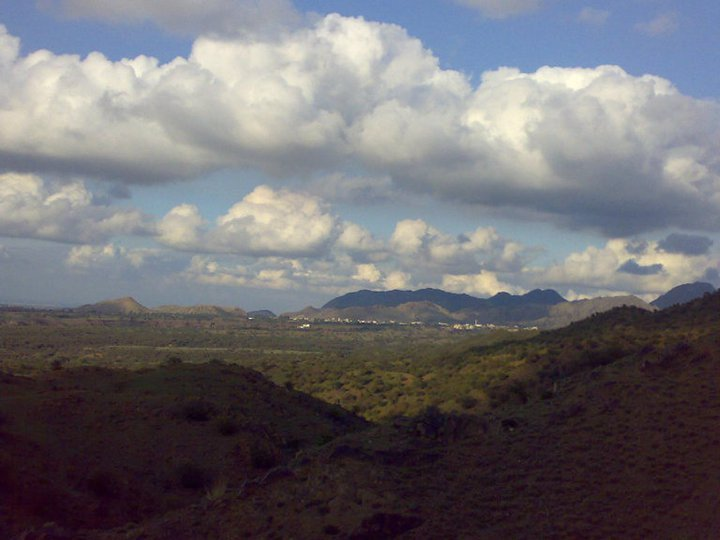
Beautiful view, Dak ismail khel

Dak Ismail Khel is a village in Pabbi Tehsil of Nowshera District of Khyber Pakhtunkhwa, Pakistan. It is surrounded by other small villages i.e. Chapri, Saleh Khana, Spin Khak, Jaroba and Jalozai. Dak Ismail Khel is the largest village with respect to both area and population in the region. Villages named Chapri, Spinkhak and Jaroba are originated from the village Dak Ismail Khel.

== Notable Natives ==
- Dr. Raj Wali Shah Khattak (1952-2015) - Poet, Researcher, Scholar and prominent figure in the region
- Barrister Baachaa (1941-2013) - lawyer and politician
