= Imran Khattak =

Pakistani politician

- عمران خٹک

Member of the National Assembly of Pakistan
- In office 13 August 2018 – 17 January 2023
- Constituency: NA-26 (Nowshera-II)
- In office 23 September 2013 – 31 May 2018
- Constituency: NA-5 (Nowshera-I)

Personal details
- Born: Nowshera, Khyber Pakhtunkhwa, Pakistan
- Party: JUI (F) (2025-present)
- Other political affiliations: PTI-P (2023-2025); PTI (2013-2023)
- Relatives: Pervez Khattak (father-in-law and uncle) Liaquat Khan Khattak (uncle)

Imran Khattak (Urdu: عمران خٹک) is a Pakistani politician who had been a member of the National Assembly of Pakistan, from August 2018 till January 2023. Previously he was a member of the National Assembly from September 2013 to May 2018.

== Family ==
Khattak is son in law and nephew of Pervez Khattak. He has one daughter named Hamail Khattak who is doing Bar at Law in the United Kingdom.

== Political career ==
Khattak was elected to the National Assembly of Pakistan as a candidate of Pakistan Tehreek-e-Insaf (PTI) from Constituency NA-5 (Nowshera-I) in by-elections held in August 2013. He received 48,043 votes and defeated Daud Khattak, a candidate of Pakistan Peoples Party. The seat fell vacant after his father in law Pervez Khattak chose to retain his seat in the Provincial Assembly of Khyber Pakhtunkhwa that he had won in the 2013 Pakistani general election. Reportedly, Khattak was allotted the PTI ticket to run in the by-election despite concerns within the party.

He was re-elected to the National Assembly as a candidate of PTI from Constituency NA-26 (Nowshera-II) in the 2018 Pakistani general election.
