= Cherat =

Hill station in Khyber-Pakhtunkhwa, Pakistan

Cherat چېراټ
- Hill Station
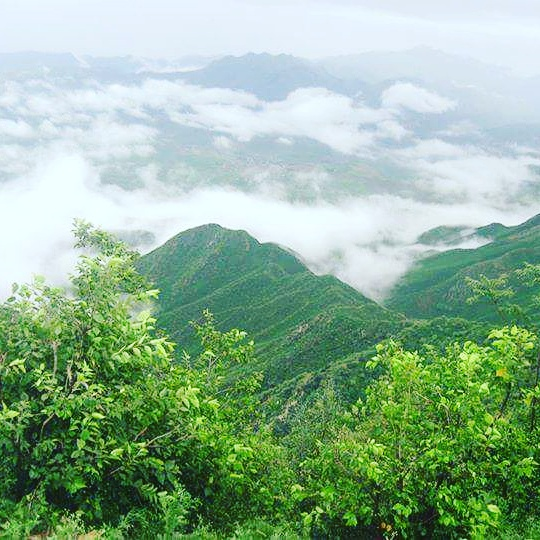
- Cherat after the summer monsoon rains

- Location within Pakistan
- Coordinates: 33.49°N 71.53°E
- Country: Pakistan
- Province: Khyber-Pakhtunkhwa
- District: Nowshera District
- Elevation: 892 m (2,927 ft)

Population (2023)
  - Total: 1,311
- Time zone: UTC+5 (PST)

Cherat (Pashto: چېراټ) is a hill station dating from the 1860s that is located immediately above the villages of Chapri, Bakhti, Saleh Khana, Kotli Kalan and Dak Ismail Khel in the Nowshera District of Khyber-Pakhtunkhwa in Pakistan. Cherat lies 34 miles south east from the city of Peshawar at an elevation of 4,500 feet on the west of the Khattak range, which divides the district of Nowshera from Kohat District.

== History ==
During British rule Cherat was important as a hill cantonment and sanitarium for British troops in what was then the Nowshera Tehsil of the Peshawar District of British India.

Cherat was first used as a sanitarium for troops in 1861 and was used during the hot weather as a health station for the British troops who were quartered in the hot and malarious valley of Peshawar. It was declared a cantonment in 1886. The cantonment commands a view of the whole of the Peshawar valley on one side, and on the other of a portion of the Khwarra valley in Peshawar District, and of Kohat District as far as the Indus.

A hospital, a church, and a few bungalows were built by the British authorities. The station, which has a good water supply, was throughout the summer the headquarters of the 1st (Peshawar) Division, and of one of the two British regiments stationed at Peshawar - a detachment of the other British regiment was also sent here.

There were 376 inhabitants according to the March 1901 Census, but in the hot season the garrison sometimes numbered 1,000 men.

== Demographics ==
=== Population ===
Historical population
Year	Pop.	±% p.a.
1951	1,123	—
1961	2,336	+7.60%
1972	989	−7.52%
1981	1,239	+2.54%
1998	2,527	+4.28%
2017	2,266	−0.57%
2023	1,311	−8.72%

As of the 2023 census, Cherat had a population of 1,311.

== Military ==
In the 1920s the British had a wireless intercept station there. The fort is used as a base by the Special Service Group and is used for training of the army. As part of joint military events with several nations, Cherat has also hosted an Improving Command Course in 2010.
