= Kihari =

Coordinates: 34.089651°N 72.793652°E

Kihari is a populated place in the Union Council of Sirikot, North-West Frontier Province, Pakistan. Kihari is about 7 kilometres (4.3 mi) from Sirikot village and about 6.8 kilometres (4.2 mi) from Tarbela.

== Description ==
Chooi Kihari is in a mountainous area west of Haripur District west of the Tarbela Dam. The majority of the population of is Hindko speaking, from the Tanoli Gujjar and Awan groups. Some speak Pashto as their mother tongue.

== Other villages close to Kihari ==
Choi, Mani, Nadi Kihari, Osmān Māni, Dorah, Bail' Garhan, Gallai, Damrah, Darrah, Chola, K. Gali, Shiftalo Shareef, Chountrai, Batgram, and others.

== Noted residents ==
Politicians

- Pir Sabir Shah - ex-Chief minister NWFP
- Pir Hamid Shah - Union Council Nazim
