= Zulfiqar Ali (Khyber Pakhtunkhwa politician) =

Member of the National Assembly of Pakistan from Nowahera (2024–2029) (MNA)

MNA Zulfiqar Ali
- ذُوالفقار علی

Member of the National Assembly of Pakistan
- Incumbent
- Assumed office 29 February 2024
- Constituency: NA-34 Nowshera-II

Personal details
- Party: PTI (2024-present)

Zulfiqar Ali (Urdu: ذُوالفقار علی), is a Pakistani politician who has been a member of the National Assembly of Pakistan since February 2024.

== Political career ==
Ali won the 2024 Pakistani general election from NA-34 Nowshera-II as an Independent candidate. He received 95,692 votes while runners up Imran Khattak of Pakistan Tehreek-e-Insaf Parliamentarians received 32,698 votes.
