= Muhammad Tariq Khattak =

Pakistani politician

Member of the National Assembly of Pakistan
- In office 2008–2013
- Constituency: NA-5 (Nowshera-1)

Muhammad Tariq Khattak is a Pakistani politician who had been a member of the National Assembly of Pakistan from 2008 to 2013. He had been a member of the Khyber Pakhtunkhwa Assembly from 2002 to 2007.

== Political career ==
He was elected to the Khyber Pakhtunkhwa Assembly as a candidate of Pakistan Peoples Party (PPP) from Constituency PF-12 (Nowshera—I) in the 2002 Pakistani general election. He received 10,695 votes and defeated Mian Iftikhar Hussain, a candidate of Awami National Party (ANP).

He was elected to the National Assembly of Pakistan from Constituency NA-5 (Nowshera-1) as a candidate of PPP in the 2008 Pakistani general election. He received 31,907 votes and defeated Tariq Hameed Khattak, a candidate of ANP.

He ran for the seat of the National Assembly from Constituency NA-5 (Nowshera-1) as a candidate of PPP in the 2013 Pakistani general election but was unsuccessful. He received 10,171 votes and lost the seat to Pervez Khattak.
