= Pabbi Tehsil =

Pabbi Tehsil تحصیل پبی پبى تحصیل
- Tehsil
- Country: Pakistan
- Province: Khyber Pakhtunkhwa
- District: Nowshera

Government
  - Chairman: Ghayur Ali Khan Khattak (ANP)

Population (2017)
  - Tehsil: 437,301
  - Urban: 55,255
  - Rural: 382,046
- Time zone: UTC+5 (PST)

Pabbi is a tehsil located in Nowshera District, Khyber-Pakhtunkhwa, Pakistan. The tehsil is named after the Pabbi town, which is located on the GT Road.

== Overview ==
Pabbi become tehsil in 2008, when NWFP (now Khyber Pakhtunkhwa) caretaker chief minister Shamsul Mulk declared it a tehsil of Nowshera district. The head quarter of Pabbi tehsil is Pabbi town, which is located on Grand Trunk (GT) road.

Pabbi tehsil covers the jurisdiction from Taro Jabba to Azakhel Payan and Cherat. Pabbi is 20 kilometers (12 miles) from Peshawar, the capital of Khyber Pukhtunkhwa province.

Pabbi is a birthplace of Gul Hassan Khan was a former lieutenant-general and the last Commander-in-Chief of Pakistan Army.

Pabbi is hub of precast concrete industries located at main GT road in Chowki Mumraiz. Currently, there are 43 precast concrete industries are functional in Pabbi which supply different items to the entire Khyber Paktunkhwa and to some parts of the Punjab.

== Administration ==
Pabbi is a part of Pakistan National Assembly seat NA-5 (Nowshera-1) while for KP Provincial Assembly it is part of PK-12 Nowshera-I.

The population of Pabbi Tehsil, according to the 2017 census, is 437,301 while according to the 1998 census, it was 246,120.

== Towns and villages ==
The main towns of Pabbi Tehsil are Pabbi, Akbarpura and Jelozai. The main villages in Pabbi are below.

- Amankot
- Azakhel Payan
- Azakhel Bala
- Bakhti
- Chand Bibi
- Chapri
- Chowki Drab
- Chowki Mumraiz
- Dag Behsood
- Dagi Jadeed
- Dak Ismail Khel
- Jabba Khattak
- Kandi Taza Din
- Khudrizi
- Kotli Kalan
- Mohib Banda
- Pashtun Garhi
- Saleh Khana
- Shahkot Bala
- Shahkot Payan
- Spin Khak

Village Jarobba

== Education ==
Pabbi tehsil is home to educational institutes including a campus of Abdul Wali Khan University Mardan in Pabbi town and a campus of University of Engineering and Technology Peshawar in Jelozai town.

It is also home to 3 degree colleges: Government College Akbarpura, Government Degree College Pabbi and Government Girls Degree College Pabbi.

== See also ==
- Nowshera Tehsil
- Jehangira Tehsil
- Nowshera District
