= Khyber Pakhtunkhwa Department of Excise and Taxation =

Pakistani taxation department

Khyber Pakhtunkhwa Department of Excise & Taxation
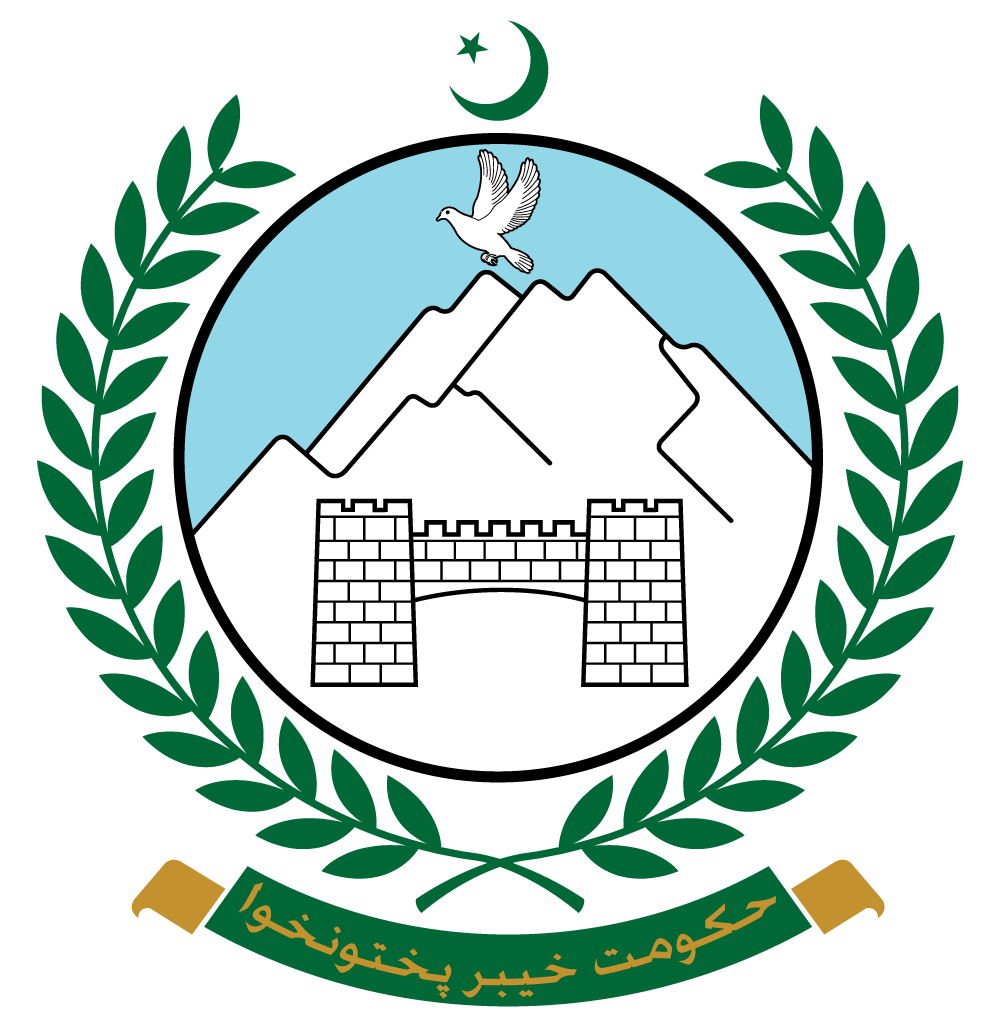
- Khyber Pakhtunkhwa emblem

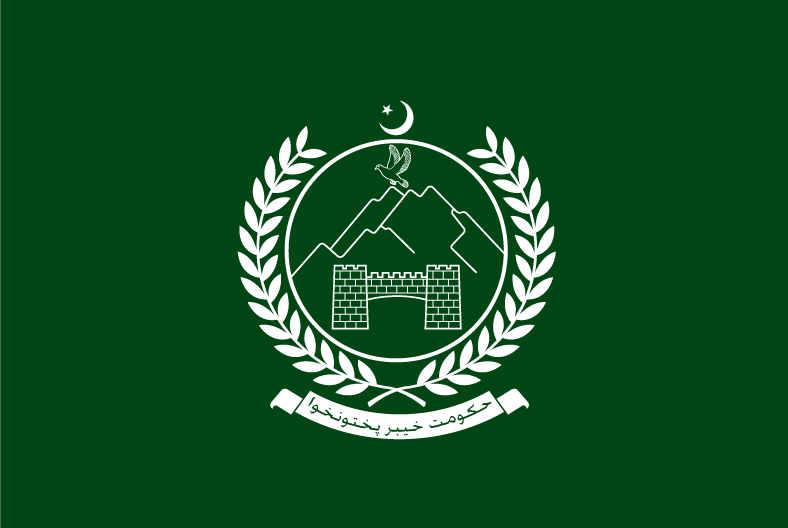
- Khyber Pakhtunkhwa flag

Agency overview
- Formed: August 14, 1973; 53 years ago
- Jurisdiction: K.P. Government
- Headquarters: Peshawar; 34°01′N 71°35′E
- Agency executives: syed Fakhr e Jehan , Minister; Fayyaz Ali Shah, Secretary
- Website: Official Website

The Khyber Pakhtunkhwa Department of Excise & Taxation (Pashto: د عوایدو ریاست خیبر پښتونخوا, Urdu:) is concerned with Excise & Taxation in the Pakistan province of Khyber Pakhtunkhwa. It is headed by the Khyber Pakhtunkhwa Minister of Excise & Taxation, who is a member of the Chief Minister's Cabinet.

Mr. Mian Jamshed-ud-Din was appointed as the first Minister of Excise & Taxation part of PTI by Chief Minister of KP Pervez Khattak on May 7, 2014. The incumbent minister in charge is Khaliq-ur-Rehman, who was appointed by Chief Minister Ali Amin Gandapur.

== History ==
The department was created on August 14, 1973. This department's main purpose is to create jobs, promote Excise and Taxation growth, encourage sustainable development and improve standards of living for all citizens of Khyber Pakhtunkhwa. The department is currently headed by Minister Khaliq-ur-Rehman.

== Organization ==
The Department is under the control and supervision of a Khyber Pakhtunkhwa Minister of Excise and Taxation, a political appointee of the Chief Minister of Khyber Pakhtunkhwa. The Excise and Taxation Minister is assisted in managing the Department by a Secretary of Excise and Taxation, also appointed by the Chief Minister, who assumes the duties of the Minister in his absence.

=== Structure ===
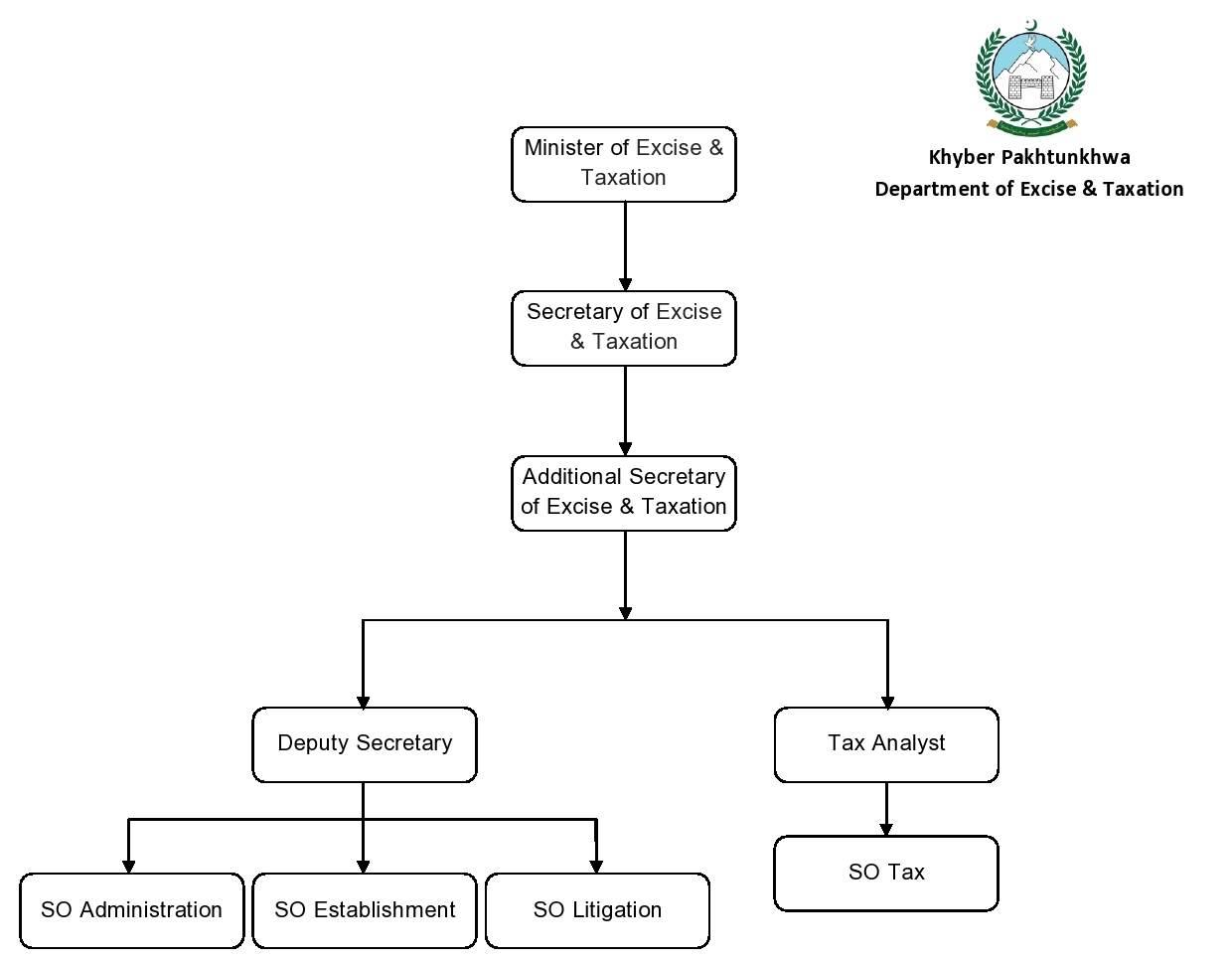
Organization Chart of the Khyber Pakhtunkhwa Department of Excise and Taxation

- Minister of Excise and Taxation
  - Secretary of Excise and Taxation
    - Additional Secretary of Excise and Taxation
      - Deputy Secretary of Excise and Taxation
        - SO Administration
        - SO Establishment
        - SO Litigation
      - Tax Analyst
        - SO Tax

== Duties ==
The duties of the department revolve around Excise and Taxation conditions and concerns in the Khyber Pakhtunkhwa. This includes advising the Chief Minister on matters of Excise and Taxation. It strives to administer the department of Excise and Taxation to carry out approved programs and make the public aware of the objectives of the department.

== List of ministers ==
No.	Name	Photo	Term began	Term ended	Governor(s)
1.	Abdur Rauf Khan		March 24, 2013	May 31, 2013	Shaukatullah Khan
2.	Abdur Rauf Khan		March 24, 2013	May 31, 2013	Shaukatullah Khan
3.	Mian Jamshed-ud-Din		April 1, 2014	Incumbent	Shaukatullah Khan; Mehtab Ahmed Khan; Iqbal Zafar Jhagra
