= Liaquat Khattak =

Pakistani politician

Member of the Provincial Assembly of Khyber Pakhtunkhwa
- In office 14 October 2018 – 18 January 2023
- Constituency: PK-64 (Nowshera-IV)

Personal details
- Party: PTI-P (2024-present)
- Other political affiliations: JUI (F) (2022-2024) PTI (2018-2022); Pakistan Peoples Party (Sherpao) (2002-2007)
- Relations: Pervez Khattak (brother)
- Children: 3, including Ahad Khattak

Liaquat Khan Khattak is a Pakistani politician who served as a member of the Provincial Assembly of Khyber Pakhtunkhwa from October 2018 to January 2023.

== Political career ==
He was elected to the Provincial Assembly of the North-West Frontier Province in the 2002 North-West Frontier Province provincial election from PF-13 Nowshera-II as a candidate of the Pakistan Peoples Party (Sherpao) (PPP-S). He received 18,115 votes and defeated Mian Yahya Shah, a candidate of the Pakistan People's Party (PPP).

Khattak was elected to the Provincial Assembly of Khyber Pakhtunkhwa as a candidate of PTI from the constituency PK-64 Nowshera-IV in the 2018 Pakistani by-elections held on 14 October 2018. He defeated Muhammad Shahid of Awami National Party (ANP). Khattak garnered 22,775 votes while his closest rival secured 9,560 votes. He served as a Minister for Irrigation Department and Excise & Taxation Department Khyber Pakhtunkhwa until February 2020. He was removed from the cabinet on 20 February 2020 on allegations that he supported Ikhtiar Wali Khan, Pakistan Muslim League (N)'s candidate, in the by-election for PK-63.

Later, he resigned from PTI and joined Jamiat Ulema-e-Islam (F) (JUI-F).

He contested the 2024 Khyber Pakhtunkhwa provincial election as a candidate of JUI-F from PK-87 Nowshera-III, but was unsuccessful. He received 12,324 votes and was defeated by Khaliq-ur-Rehman, a PTI-backed independent candidate.
