= Mir Afzal Khan =

Pakistani politician

Chief Minister of the North-West Frontier Province
- In office August 7, 1990 – July 19, 1993
- Preceded by: Aftab Ahmad Sherpao
- Succeeded by: Mufti Muhammad Abbas
- Constituency: Mardan, Khyber-Pakhtunkhwa

Personal details
- Born: 1923 (age 101–102) Mardan
- Died: 1996 Mardan
- Political party: Pakistan Muslim League

Mir Afzal Khan (born 1923) is a Pakistani politician from the Khyber-Pakhtunkhwa province of Pakistan. He served as the 16th Chief Minister of the province from 7 August 1990 to 19 July 1993.

== Early life ==
Afzal Khan was born to a wealthy family of landlords in Mardan, Khyber Pakhtunkhwa at the home of Sarfaraz Khan, who was well known politician from Mardan in then NWFP now Khyber Pakhtunkhwa. He was the brother of Begum Zari Sarfaraz, who was a politician and social worker.

== See also ==
- List of chief ministers of Khyber Pakhtunkhwa
- Khyber PakhtunKhwa

Political offices
Preceded by Aftab Ahmad Sherpao	Chief Minister of Khyber-Pakhtunkhwa; 1990 – 1993	Succeeded by Mufti Muhammad Abbas
