= Iqbal Khan Jadoon =

Pakistani politician (1931–1977)

Fakhr-e-Hazara Iqbal Khan Jadoon

7th Chief Minister of the North-West Frontier Province
- In office April 9, 1977 – July 5, 1977
- Governor: Naseerullah Babar
- Preceded by: Nasrullah Khan Khattak
- Succeeded by: Arbab Jehangir Khan

Personal details
- Born: 1931 Abbottabad, Hazara
- Died: 1984 (aged 53)
- Party: Pakistan People's Party

Mohammed Iqbal Khan Jadoon (1931–1977) was a Pakistani politician from the Khyber-Pakhtunkhwa province of Pakistan. He was born in Abbottabad in 1931. Elected to the NA-12 (Abbottabad) constituency, Jadoon was also the 7th elected Chief Minister of the province from the 9 April 1977 to 5 July 1977. He died in 1984 in London at age 53. He was given the title Pride of Hazāra for his numerous contributions to the betterment of the people of KPK and Pakistan. The attendance at his funeral exceeded fifty thousand people. The people of the province observed a 3 day mourning as a mark of respect. His hallmark was that he never used any government resources and preferred his own. As a minister he rented a house in Peshawar and used his own cars, servants etc. He represented the people at various elected posts from 1964 to 1977. His wife survived him and died in Abbottabad in 2019.

== See also ==
- List of chief ministers of Khyber Pakhtunkhwa
- Khyber Pakhtunkhwa

Political offices
Preceded by Nasrullah Khan Khattak	Chief Minister of Khyber-Pakhtunkhwa; 1977	Succeeded by Arbab Jehangir Khan
