= Khudrizi =

Khudrizi or Khudrizai (خدريزي) is a small village located in Pakistan on GT Road on the way from Nowshehra to Peshawar. Khudrizi is part of Pabbi2 union council.
