= Tariq Pervez Khan =

Pakistani politician (1948–2020)

Chief Minister of Khyber Pakhtunkha (caretaker)
- In office 20 March 2013 – 31 May 2013
- Governor: Shaukatullah Khan
- Preceded by: Ameer Haider Khan Hoti
- Succeeded by: Pervez Khattak

Chief Justice of Peshawar High Court
- In office 5 April 2005 – 21 October 2009

Personal details
- Born: 15 February 1948 Peshawar
- Died: 18 April 2020 (aged 72)
- Citizenship: Pakistan

Tariq Pervez Khan (15 February 1948 – 18 April 2020) was a Pakistani jurist who served as a Chief Justice of Peshawar High Court, and later as a judge of the Supreme Court of Pakistan. He also served as the caretaker chief minister of Khyber Pakhtunkhwa from 20 March 2013 to 31 May 2013. He was also the acting governor twice during the tenure of Governor Ali Muhammad Jan Orakzai. On 10 November 2014, he was nominated as the chief election commissioner of Pakistan.

== Biography ==
Tariq was born on 15 February 1948 in Sikander Town, Peshawar. Tariq Pervez obtained a law degree from Law College Peshawar University in 1971 and a political science degree from the University of Peshawar in 1975. Tariq had been associated with the law profession for the past four decades. He started advocating with the Peshawar District Court in 1972 and obtained the license of the Peshawar High Court in 1975. Tariq became a Supreme Court lawyer in 1983 after advocating for the High Court for eleven years. Tariq became the Peshawar High Court judge in 1997 while in April 2005 he was promoted to the Chief Justice of the Peshawar High Court.

He refused to take oath under the PCO on 3 November 2007, after Pervez Musharraf imposed an emergency in the country. Tariq Pervez was re-appointed Chief Justice of the Peshawar High Court on 5 September 2008 under the PCO's Chief Justice Abdul Hameed Dogar and was made a Supreme Court Judge on 20 October 2009.

Tariq Pervez retired on 14 February 2013 at the age of 65. He had three daughters and a son.

He died on 18 April 2020.

Political offices
Preceded by Ameer Haider Khan Hoti	Chief Minister of Khyber-Pakhtunkhwa; 2013–2013	Succeeded by Parvez Khattak
