= Sajida Zulfiqar =

Pakistani politician

Member of the National Assembly of Pakistan
- In office 13 August 2018 – 25 January 2023
- Constituency: Reserved seat for women
- In office 1 June 2013 – 31 May 2018
- Constituency: Reserved seat for women

Personal details
- Party: Pakistan tehreek insaf (2025–present)
- Other political affiliations: PTI (2018–2023)
- Relatives: Pervez Khattak (uncle)

Sajida Zulfiqar (Urdu: ساجدہ ذوالفقار) is a Pakistani politician who had been a member of the National Assembly of Pakistan, from August 2018 till January 2023. Previously she was a member of the National Assembly from June 2013 to May 2018.

== Education ==
She has received education from the University of Peshawar.

== Political career ==
She was elected to the National Assembly of Pakistan as a candidate of Pakistan Tehreek-e-Insaf (PTI) on a reserved seat for women from Khyber Pakhtunkhwa in the 2013 Pakistani general election.

She was re-elected to the National Assembly as a candidate of PTI on a reserved seat for women from Khyber Pakhtunkhwa in the 2018 Pakistani general election.
