= Sirikot =

- Union council
- Interactive map of Sirikot
- Coordinates: 34°10′N 73°43′E
- Country: Pakistan
- Province: Khyber Pakhtunkhwa
- District: Haripur
- Tehsil: Ghazi

Population
  - Total: 85,000

Sirikot is a village in Haripur District and Ghazi Tehsil, in Pakistan's Khyber Pakhtunkhwa Province at 34°10'60N 73°43'50E. It is the principal settlement of the Union Council.

People living in Sirikot are from Mashwani Sayyid (Syed), Awan (tribe) and other indigenous Pushto and Hindko speakers.

Prominent Personalities:

Syed Sabir Shah, Athar Minallah, Safdar Shah etc.

== See also ==
- Kihari
