= Nasrullah Khan Khattak =

Pakistani politician

6th Chief Minister of the North-West Frontier Province
- In office 3 May 1975 – 9 April 1977
- Governor: Syed Ghawas; Naseerullah Babar
- Preceded by: Sardar Inayatullah Khan Gandapur
- Succeeded by: Mohammad Iqbal Khan Jadoon

Personal details
- Born: 1923
- Died: 2 November 2009; Nowshera
- Political party: Pakistan Peoples Party

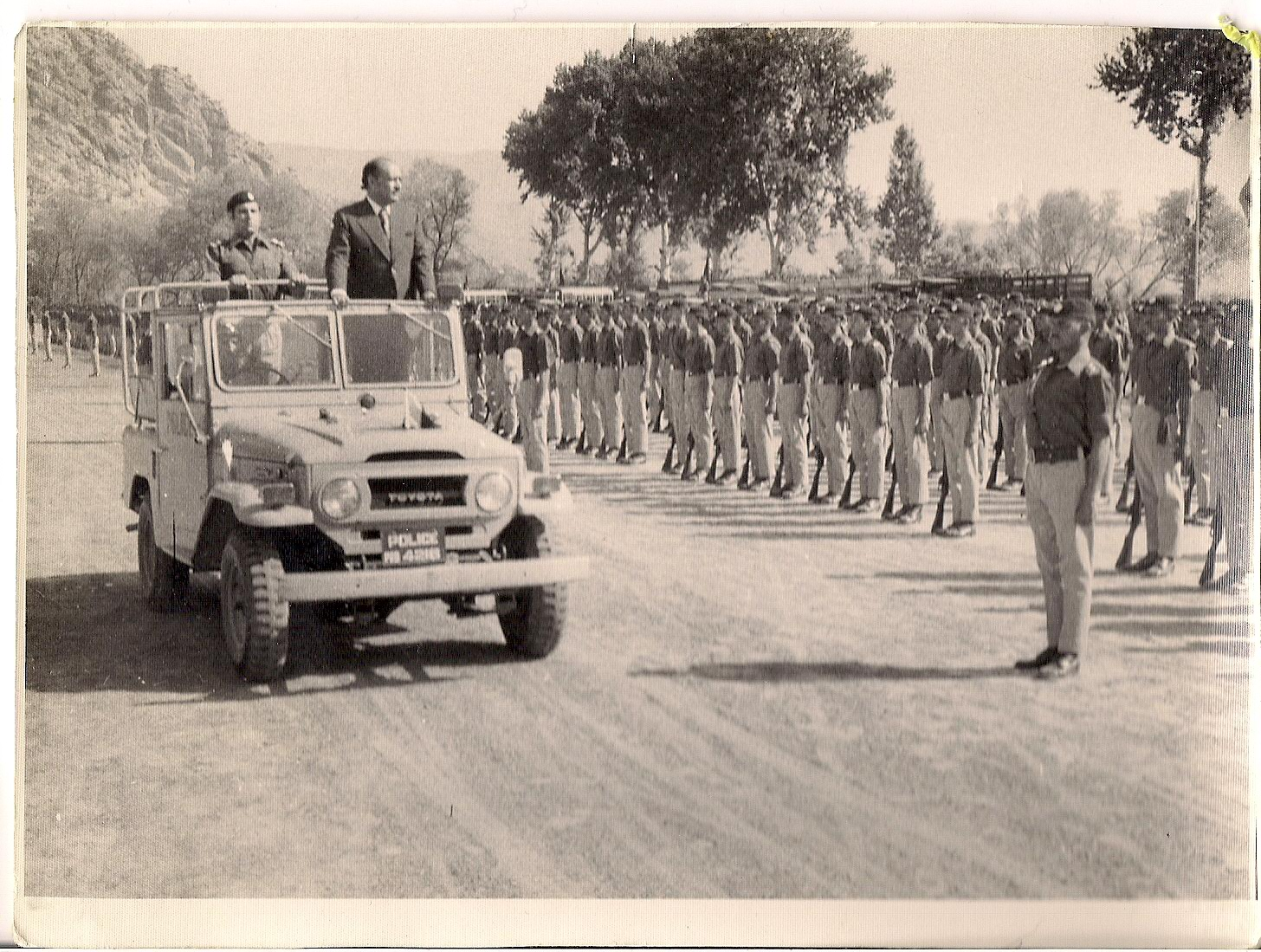
Nasrullah Khan Khattak in Peshawar (1973)

Nasrullah Khan Khattak (1923 – 2 November 2009) was a Pakistani politician, who was the 6th elected Chief Minister of the North-West Frontier Province (now Khyber Pakhtunkhwa) and served from 3 May 1975 to 19 April 1977.

== Early life and education ==
He was born in 1923 in the village of Manki Sharif to Hastam Khan Khattak. He belonged to the Khattak tribe. He studied at Aitchison College, Lahore. He was the cousin of Pervez Khattak, a former chief minister of Khyber Pakhtunkhwa.

== Political career ==
Nasrullah Khattak started his political career when he was elected as chairman of the Manki Sharif Union Council in 1962. He was also elected as member of the West Pakistan Assembly during the time of President Ayub Khan.

He joined Pakistan Peoples Party (PPP) in 1967, when the party was launched and he was a close friend of Zulfikar Ali Bhutto. He was one of the founding leaders of PPP and played an important role in establishing the party in the North-West Frontier Province. He was also the Pakistani Ambassador to Tunisia during his political career. After the assassination of PPP's Hayat Muhammad Khan Sherpao, Khattak was made Chief Minister of the North-West Frontier Province now known as Khyber Pakhtunkhwa. He was defeated in the 1977 election and was never re-elected to the assembly.

In his later years, he joined Tehrik-e-Istiqlal later called Qaumi Jamhoori Party (QJP) of Asghar Khan and served as central vice president of the party.

== Death ==
Nasrullah Khattak died due to cardiac arrest on 2 November 2009 at the age of 86. He was buried in Manki Sharif graveyard and people attended his funeral in large numbers.

== See also ==
- List of chief ministers of Khyber Pakhtunkhwa

Political offices
Preceded by Sardar Inayatullah Khan Gandapur	Chief Minister of Khyber-Pakhtunkhwa; 1975–1977	Succeeded by Iqbal Khan Jadoon
