= Sher Zaman Taizi =

Pakistani writer, poet and journalist

Sher Zaman Taizi (3 November 1931 – 22 December 2009) was Pashtun writer, poet, intellectual and journalist from Pakistan.

== Career ==
Born in Pabbi, Nowshera District, Khyber-Pakhtunkhwa (then NWFP), Present-day Pakistan. Taizi served in the Army Service Corps as a clerk (1949–1954), Intelligence Bureau of the Government of Pakistan, Peshawar, (1954–1977), as Liaison Officer Afghan Refugees Commissionerate, Peshawar (1979–1980), UNHCR (Protection Officer and Programme Officer; 1980–1991), daily the Frontier Post, Peshawar (Assistant Editor; 1991–1995) and BBC Education Project at Peshawar (Editor of the New Home New Life – a trilingual magazine; 1996–1997). Later he was attached to the Tribal Women Welfare Association as vice-chairperson and editor-in-chief of its bilingual quarter Neway Zhwand (New Life).

During his service in the Intelligence Bureau, Taizi spent more than 15 years in tribal areas, having stayed in every tribal agency, and more than seven years in the Pakistan Embassy in Kabul, Afghanistan.

== Education ==
Having done his M.A. in Pashto, Taizi did his PhD from the Area Study Centre, Peshawar University. His thesis in English is related to "the Saur Revolution (1978) – the Communist Revolution that took place in April 1978".

== Literary figure ==
In Pashto literary circles Taizi was still known as Ghamzhan, although he has long given up that pen name and instead uses his family name Taizi.

== Published books in Pashto ==
- Warsho (poetry),
- Soma (poetry,
- Gulpana (drama),
- Shpelae (short stories),
- Gul Khan (novel),
- Amanat (novel),
- Rahman Koroona (novel),
- Ghunday (novel),
- Wade o’ n’ sho (novel),
- Nara Zheba (research article on Pashto language),
- Novel: Hunan au Safar (research article on characteristics of novel)
- Da Pukhto Leekdod: Yao Sarsari Jaj (research article on Pashto script)
- Suqut-e-Afghanistan (Translated into Pashto from English – The Fall of Afghanistan by Samad Ghaus).

== Published books in English ==
- Polar Bear (Tr. From Pashto poetry of Mohammad Hasham Zamani),
- The Pukhtun’ Unity (From Pashto – Qami Wahdat by Mohammad Afzal Khan, a former federal minister),
- Abad Khan: The Lost Ring of the Chain (Tr. From Urdu by Anwar Khan Deewana),
- Rahman Baba: the Outstanding Painter of Thoughts,
- The Saur Revolution (Research article on the Communist Revolution that took place in Afghanistan in 1978),
- Afghanistan: From Najib to Mojaddedi (booklet in two volumes),
- Afghanistan: A Clash of Interests,
- Afghanistan: Two Governments and Three Capitals,
- Afghanistan: Drug Menace in Central Asia,
- Afghanistan: Landmine Menace in Afghanistan
- Bare-foot in Coarse Clothes (translated from Dari; by Dr. Hassan Sharq, a former Prime Minister of Afghanistan)
- Bacha Khan in Afghanistan,
- Terrorist Attacks in USA and US Attack on Afghanistan.
- Secret Plans and Open Faces (Tr. from Pashto; Pate Tautiye, Barbande Tsere by Hikmatyar)
- Dispute between Iran and Afghanistan on the issue of Hirmand River (Tr. from Persian: by Gholam-Reza Fakhari, Tehran; 1993)
- Nights in Kabul (Tr. from Dari by General Umarzai)
- Causes of the Fall of the Islamic State of Afghanistan under Ustad Rabbani in Kabul (Tr. from Dari: by Syed ‘Allam-ud-Din Atseer)
- General Elections in Afghanistan 2005.

== Published books in Pashto and English ==
  1. The Mother Tongue (Moranae Zheba).
