= Zari Sarfaraz =

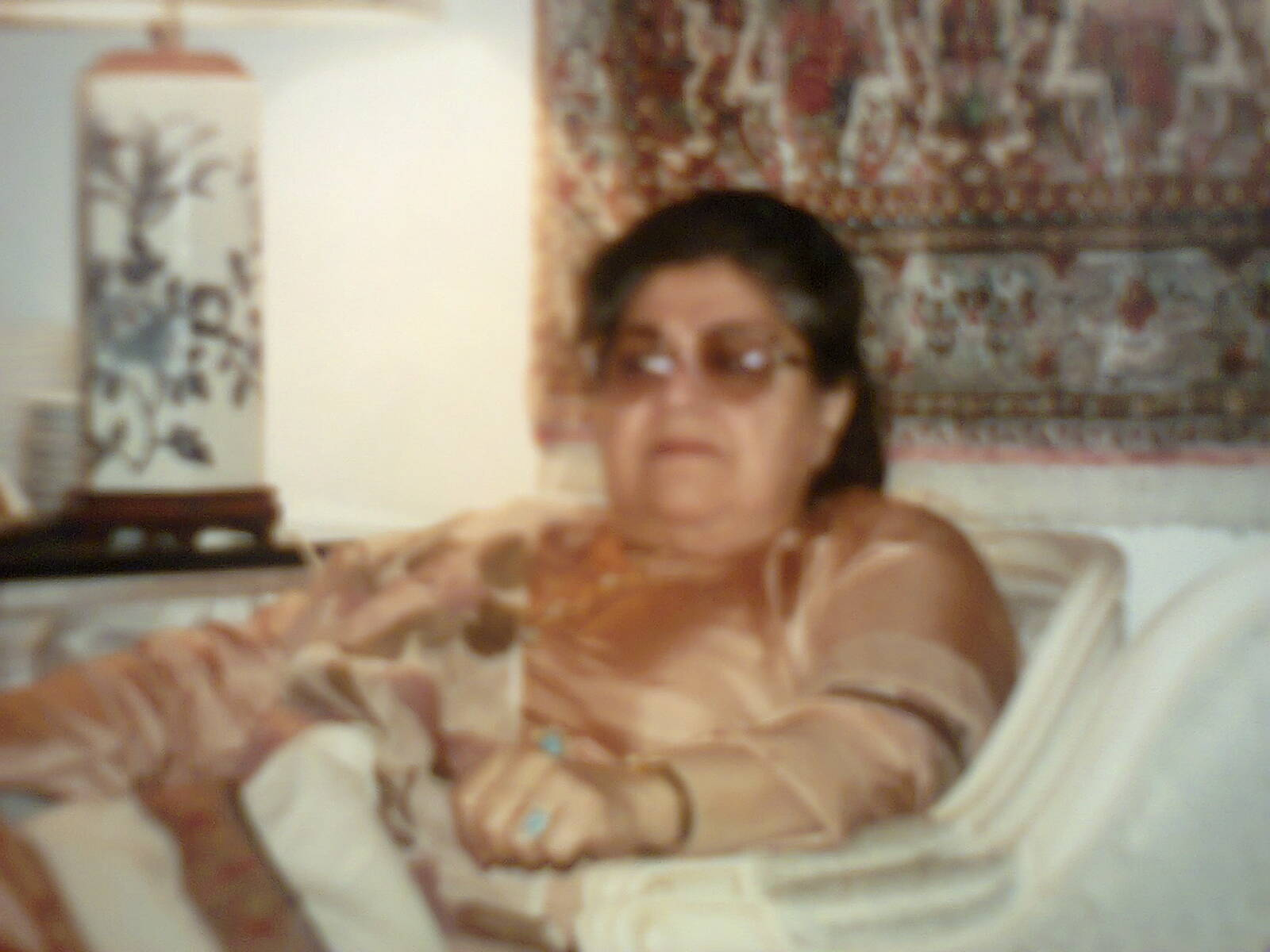
- Zari Sarfaraz at home, 2003
- Born: 28 July 1923; Mardan
- Died: 27 April 2008 (aged 84); Islamabad, Pakistan
- Resting place: Mardan
- Years active: 1940s—1969
- Known for: Political activism

Begum Zari Sarfaraz (28 July 1923 – 27 April 2008) was a noted early political activist and committed social worker of North-West Frontier Province (now Khyber Pakhtunkhwa), Pakistan.

== Early life and family ==
Zari Sarfaraz was born on 28 July 1923, to a wealthy Pashtun family of Mardan, in the North West Frontier Province (now Khyber Pakhtunkhwa in present-day Pakistan) of British India. Her father was Sarfaraz Khan, a wealthy landlord of the area. She was the eldest of 3 surviving children, and the elder sister of the late Mir Afzal Khan, a former chief minister of NWFP and former senator. Her other brother Mr Aziz Sarfarz, is a Pakistani businessman.

As a child, she was sent as a full boarder pupil to the Presentation Convent School, Srinagar, and after completing her higher secondary schooling, she returned home to Mardan. She aspired to become a medical doctor, but her father's early and untimely death forced her to adopt the main role in managing the family property and businesses.

Zari Sarfaraz was briefly married to a relative at the age of 19, who died a mere 18 months into their marriage. She never had any children of her own nor did she remarry, preferring instead to dedicate herself to public service and a number of new business ventures.

== Career ==
From around 1943 to 1944, Begum Zari Sarfaraz successfully expanded her family business, including the Premier Sugar Mills and Distillery Company Ltd, in Mardan, and also set up other entrepreneurial ventures in various places.

Around this time, she also became deeply interested in the rapidly expanding Pakistan Movement. She became a leading young member of this movement and played an active role in furthering the Muslim League's cause whilst also running her own business from 1945 onwards.

After Partition and the Independence of Pakistan in 1947, she remained an active political worker and leader of the Muslim League and was in due course elected as a member of the West Pakistan National Assembly in 1962.

== Later life and career ==
During the presidency of Muhammad Zia-ul-Haq, she headed the 15-member Pakistan National Commission on the Status of Women in 1985 and recommended drastic changes in the existing laws to end discrimination against women. During this time, she also served as the Federal Minister for Women Development. She also headed All Pakistan Women Association (APWA), and was a life member of the Pakistan Red Crescent Society and a close associate of senior social workers such as Lady Viqar un Nisa Noon, Dr. Attiya Inayatullah and others.

She continued politics till her retirement in 1969 when she got “aloof” from it, as the “style and pattern” of politics had changed.

Zari Sarfaraz died at age 83, at her residence in Islamabad, in April 2008.
