= Barrister Baachaa =

Barrister Baachaa Khan
- Born: 1941; Dag Ismail Khel, Pakistan
- Died: May 18, 2013 (aged 72); Peshawar, Pakistan

Barrister Baachaa Khan (1941 – 18 May 2013) was a Pakistani lawyer and ANP (Awami National Party) leader. He was very active in the historic Pakistan Lawyers' Movement, during which he was arrested and jailed. He is an Ex-vice president of the Pakistan Supreme Court Bar Association.

In the 28 October 2009 elections for the Pakistan Supreme Court Bar presidency, Baachaa lost to Qazi Muhammad Anwar by 44 votes. Baachaa has called for new elections, protesting that the vote was rigged.
