= Shamsul Mulk =

Pakistani politician

Chief Minister of North-West Frontier Province (caretaker)
- In office 11 October 2007 – 31 March 2008
- Preceded by: Akram Khan Durrani
- Succeeded by: Ameer Haider Khan Hoti
- Scientific career
- Born: Nowshera
- Citizenship: Pakistani
- Education: University of Engineering and Technology
- Known for: Tarbela Dam
- Awards: Hilal-i-Imtiaz
- Fields: Civil Engineering
- Workplaces: Water and Power Development Authority; Global Water Partnership; Sustainable Development Policy Institute; Naval School of Logistics and Management; GIK Institute of Engineering Sciences and Technology

Shamsul Mulk (Urdu: شمس الملک) HI, is a Pakistani civil engineer and a Technocrat. Shamsul Mulk served as the caretaker 22nd Chief Minister of the North-West Frontier Province (now Khyber Pakhtunkhwa) under the military government of Chief of Army Staff General Pervez Musharraf. He also served as Chairman Water and Power Development Authority WAPDA of Pakistan. He was 3rd Chairperson of Board of Governors of Sustainable Development Policy Institute. He is a strong supporter for the construction of the Kalabagh Dam.

Political offices
Preceded by Akram Khan Durrani	Chief Minister of Khyber-Pakhtunkhwa; 2007 – 2008	Succeeded by Ameer Haider Khan Hoti
