= Jabba Khattak =

Village in Nowshera District, Pakistan

Coordinates: 33°53′29.2″N 71°53′44.42″E

Jabba Khattak is a village located in Pabbi Tehsil of Nowshera District, Pakistan. It has a small dam which is being built for irrigation and to supply drinking water to the area surrounding the village.

== Tribes and Clans ==
Jabba Khattak is inhabited by the Khattak tribe of the Pashtuns. The tribe is then divided into clans (khels), namely:

- Zari Khel
- Parcham Khel
- Molayan
- Khudad Khel

Each clan has its own mullah/leader which is their village clan's representative in a Pashtun council called the jirga, to settle village disputes and progress.

== Mosques 5 ==
- There are five important mosques in Jabba Khattak village:
- Muhla khel *Central Mosque (muhlayan)

((Zari khel) needet|date October 2022))

- Bara Jumat (Parcham Khel).
- Khudad Khel Mosque
- spin Qamar jumat
- Khan bahdar check jumat

== See also ==
- Pabbi Tehsil
- Nowshera District
