= Muhammad Idrees =

Pakistani politician

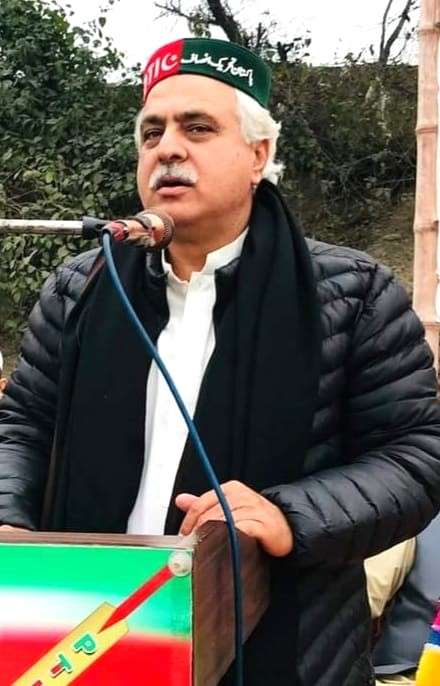

Member of the Khyber Pakhtunkhwa Assembly
- In office 13 August 2018 – 18 January 2023
- Constituency: PK-62 (Nowehsera-II)
- In office 31 May 2013 – 28 May 2018
- Constituency: PK-15 (Nowshera-IV)

Personal details
- Born: Nowshera District, Khyber Pakhtunkhwa, Pakistan
- Party: PTI (2013-present)
- Occupation: Politician

Muhammad Idrees (Urdu: محمد ادریس) is a Pakistani politician from Nowshera District, who had been a member of the Provincial Assembly of Khyber Pakhtunkhwa from May 2013 to May 2018 and from August 2018 to January 2023, belonging to the Pakistan Tehreek-e-Insaf. He also served as the chairman and a member of different committees. On 8 February 2024, he contest in general election 2024 as an independent candidate for member of provinvincial assembly and was re-elected for the third time from PK-86 constituency of district nowshera.

== Political career ==
Idrees was elected as the member of the Khyber Pakhtunkhwa Assembly on the ticket of Pakistan Tehreek-e-Insaf, from PK-15 (Nowshera-IV) in the 2013 Khyber Pakhtunkhwa provincial election.

In the 2018 general election of Pakistan, [Name] was elected as a member of the Khyber Pakhtunkhwa Assembly. During his tenure, he served as the chairman of the Public Accounts Committee, which functions as the Audit Committee of Parliament. This committee plays a pivotal role in public financial accountability, established by Federal and Provincial Legislatures to scrutinize the accounts of governments and their agencies. Additionally, also presided over the Khyber Pakhtunkhwa Assembly as a speaker on several occasions.

On 8 February 2024, he was re-elected for the third time as a member of the Khyber Pakhtunkhwa Assembly, running as an independent candidate. He secured victory in the election with a lead of 25,170 votes 8

As of January 2018 he is the Chairman of Standing Committee No. 30 on Inter Provincial Co-ordination Department. And he is a member of different committees the likes of Public Accounts Committee, Administration Department, Communication and Works Department, Public Health Engineering Department. He also takes part in Committees on sports, culture, tourism, museums archeology and youth affairs department, on Population Welfare Department, on Planning and Development Department and on Auqaf, Hajj, religious and minority affairs department. In 2015 he was a chairman in Standing Committee no. 29 on Housing Department/Provincial Housing Authority.
