= Azam Khan Hoti =

Pakistan army officer (1967–1973) and politician

- اعظم خان ہوتی

Member of Senate
- In office 12 March 2012 – 15 April 2015

Federal Minister for Communications
- In office 20 March 1998 – 6 August 1998
Previous offices
Member of the 11th National Assembly
In office
15 February 1997 – 12 December 1999
Federal Minister for Communications
In office
11 March 1992 – 18 July 1993
Member of the 9th National Assembly
In office
3 November 1990 – 18 July 1993

Personal details
- Born: Mohammad Azam Khan Hoti; 27 April 1946 Mardan, North-West Frontier Province, British India
- Died: 15 April 2015 (aged 68)
- Cause of death: Laryngeal cancer
- Resting place: Hoti House, Mardan, Khyber Pakhtunkhwa, Pakistan
- Party: Awami National Party (1986–2015)
- Other political affiliations: National Awami Party (Wali) (1972–1973); National Democratic Party (1973–1974)
- Spouse(s): Nasereen Wali Khan Widow Farah Azam Khan Widow Shamim Kiyani; Humera Azam Hoti
- Relations: Begum Nasim Wali Khan (sister)
- Children: 5 (including [[Ameer Haider Khan Hoti,Ameer Ghazan khan hoti ,Shama khan hoti ,Aryan Khan Hoti and Daniyal Khan Hoti).
- Parent: Amir Muhammad Khan (father)
- Education: Pakistan Military Academy; Aitchison College; Government Degree College Nowshera
- Awards: Tamgha-e-Jang 1971 War
- Nickname: Baba

Military service
- Allegiance: Pakistan
- Branch/service: Pakistan Army
- Years of service: 1967–1973
- Rank: Captain
- Unit: Pakistan Army Armoured Corps
- Battles/wars: Indo-Pakistani War of 1971

Azam Khan Hoti (Urdu: اعظم خان ہوتی; 27 April 1946 – 15 April 2015) was a retired Pakistan Army captain and politician.

== Early life ==
Born as Muhammad Azam Khan Hoti on 27 April 1946, he was raised in a renowned political family in Mardan. His father Amir Muhammad Khan was a member of the Khudai Khidmatgar founded by Bacha Khan. As a result, Amir spent several years behind bars during the British Raj and the Ayub Khan dictatorship due to his political activities.

=== Education ===
Hoti received his early education in Risalpur and later studied at the Aitchison College in Lahore and graduated from the Government Degree College Nowshera.

== Family ==
He had close family ties with Bacha Khan. His sister Begum Naseem Wali was married to Abdul Wali Khan and ANP president Asfandyar Wali Khan is his nephew.

== Personal life ==
Hoti had been married twice and had two sons and one daughter. His ex-wife Shamim Kiyani, attempted suicide on 20 March 2014 for his refusal to give her Dowry of Rs. 110 million (equivalent to Rs. 560 million or US$2.0 million in 2021). He denied that she was his wife.

== Military career ==
After completing his education, Azam joined the Pakistan Army in 1967 and was commissioned into the Pakistan Army Armoured Corps. He later participated in the Indo-Pakistani War of 1971. He resigned after there were deadly clashes between Pakthun activists and the army at the Liaqat National Bagh on 23 March 1973.

== Political career ==
After resigning from the army in 1973, he joined the National Awami Party (Wali) (NAP). When National Awami Party was banned by ZAB, Hoti joined the National Democratic Party (NDP). He subsequently went into exile and spent several years in Afghanistan before finally returning in 1979 after Muhammad Zia-ul-Haq announced a general Amnesty for Pakhtun leaders. In 1986, he joined the Awami National Party.

He was a member of the ANPs central and provincial executive committees and also led the Nangialai Pakhtun, the ANP's youth wing for many years. Azam Hoti was twice elected as an MNA from Mardan in 1990 and 1997 on the ANP ticket from different constituencies. He was twice made the federal minister for communication in Prime Minister Nawaz Sharif’s government in 1991 and 1997. In March 1994, he was elected as a member of the Senate of Pakistan. He remained a member of various Standing Committees of the Senate.

=== Controversies ===
Hoti claimed in 2013 that his sister Begum Nasim Wali Khan and Asfandyar Wali Khan had taken US$35,000,000 (equivalent to $52,337,713 in 2025) from the US Government after their visit to the US following their success in the 2008 Pakistani general election to ignore the bloodshed of Pakhtuns.

=== Expulsion and reconciliation with ANP ===
Serious differences arose between Azam Hoti and Asfandyar Wali Khan when the ANP suffered a humiliating defeat in the 2013 Pakistani general election. In several statements, he had demanded Asfandyar to quit the party and held him responsible for ANP’s defeat in the polls.

Afterwards, Azam Hoti was expelled from the ANP for issuing statements against the party leadership. The confrontation also led to a bitter relationship between him and his son Ameer Haider Hoti, former Chief Minister of KPK. Azam left his house and hometown Mardan and moved to his Shami Road residence in Peshawar.

The local elders and leaders of the ANP in Mardan made efforts for reconciliation between the father and son. The efforts succeeded and the two reconciled. Azam Hoti went to his lavish residence in Mardan after the reconciliation, but had to return to Peshawar due to his illness.

== Health ==
In 2012, he went to London for treatment for his throat cancer and was later treated in Peshawar and Islamabad. Due to corruption charges dating back to his days as a federal minister, he was arrested by the National Accountability Bureau.

== Death ==
He died in Mardan on 15 April 2015 a few days before his 69th birthday, from throat cancer. He was laid to rest near his mother's grave on the outskirts of the Hoti house.

== Effective dates of promotion ==
Insignia	Rank	Date
	Captain	1970
	Lieutenant	1968
	Second Lieutenant	1967

== Awards and decorations ==

Tamgha-e-Jang 1971 War

(War Medal 1971)
