= Manki Sharif =

Manki Sharif مانکی
- Union Council
- Interactive map of Manki Sharif
- Country: Pakistan
- Province: Khyber-Pakhtunkhwa
- District: Nowshera District

Population (2017)
  - Total: 21,785
- Time zone: UTC+5 (PST)

Manki (Urdu: مانکی is a town and Union Council of Nowshera District in Khyber Pakhtunkhwa, Pakistan. It is located to the south of Swabi. According to the 2017 census, the population of Manki Sharif is 21,785.

Manki is also the home of one of the most powerful families in Pakistan. The Khattak family of Manki village includes Nasrullah Khan Khattak ex-Chief Minister, Khyber Pakhtunkhwa. The Khattak family is responsible for building most of the large dams and link canals in Pakistan, including Khanpur Dam, Simly Dam, and Rawal Dam and many other large construction projects.

Manki Shareef is the birthplace of former chief ministers of Khyber Pakhtunkhwa, Nasrullah Khan Khattak and Parvaiz Khattak.

== See also ==
- Nowshera District
- Khyber Pakhtunkhwa
