= PK-86 Nowshera-II =

Pakistani electoral district

- Constituency for the Khyber Pakhtunkhwa Assembly
- Region: Jehangira and Nowshera Tehsils (partly) of Nowshera District

Current constituency
- Party: Pakistan Tehreek-e-Insaf
- Member(s): Muhammad Idrees
- Created from: PK-15 Nowshera-IV (2002-2018); PK-62 Nowshera-II (2018-2023)

PK-86 Nowshera-II (پی کے-86 نوشہرہ-2) is a constituency for the Khyber Pakhtunkhwa Assembly of the Khyber Pakhtunkhwa province of Pakistan.

== See also ==
- PK-85 Nowshera-I
- PK-87 Nowshera-III
