= Hamid Nawaz Khan =

Pakistani politician

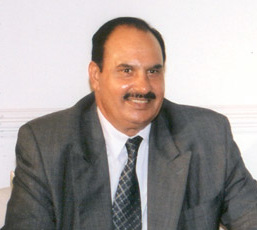
- Khan in 2004
- Born: Sheikhupura, Punjab
- Died: 24 February 2014 Rawalpindi, Pakistan
- Allegiance: Pakistan
- Branch: Pakistan Army
- Service years: 1966–2006
- Rank: Lt. Gen.
- Commands: 33rd Infantry Division; Command and Staff College; National Defence University; Vice Chief of General Staff (VCGS)
- Conflicts: Indo-Pakistani War of 1971
- Awards: Hilal-i-Imtiaz (military)
- Other work: Civil servant

Hamid Nawaz Khan, HI(M), was a Pakistan Army general who served as Interior Minister of Pakistan from November 2007 to April 2008 and Defence Secretary of Pakistan from 2001 to 2005. He also held the positions of chairman at Pakistan International Airlines, the Civil Aviation Authority and the Fauji Foundation.

He was the nephew of Chaudhry Naseer Ahmad Malhi from his father's side, one of the founders of Pakistan and the First Education Minister of Pakistan. His family is a part of the Sivia Jatt community.

== Education and Army Career ==
Nawaz Khan was a commerce graduate with honours from Punjab University and a M.Sc. in War Studies from Quaid-i-Azam University. He was commissioned in the Army Artillery Corps in 1966 as a Butt Shikan, in the 28th medium ARTY Punjab Regiment in which he served for 34 years. He commanded a Helicopter Squadron, Wing, Group and Regiment (II Corps Aviation Regiment between 1986 and 1989).

He was the chief of staff in a Corps Headquarters and Instructor in Command and Staff College in Quetta and National Defence University, Islamabad. He commanded the 33rd Infantry Division in Quetta for three years (1995–1998), served as Chief Instructor of Armed Forces War College at the then National Defense College (1998–2000). He was then promoted to Lieutenant General in March 2000 and posted as the Vice Chief of the General Staff (VCGS).

Hamid led the army college at Abbottabad until 2004, when he was promoted to Quetta corps commander. In this role he led the crackdown on the Balochistan insurgency led by Akbar Bugti. He retired from the army in 2007 and was promoted as Interior Minister of Pakistan.

== Awards and recognition ==
- Hilal-i-Imtiaz (Crescent of Excellence) Award by the President of Pakistan.

Political offices
Preceded by Aftab Ahmad Sherpao	Interior Minister of Pakistan; 2007 – 2008	Succeeded by Rehman Malik
