= Spin Khak =

Coordinates: 33°52′N 71°46′E

Spin Khak is a village in Pabbi Tehsil of Nowshera District of Khyber Pakhtunkhwa, Pakistan. It is located at 33°52'0N 71°46'0E and lies 45 kilometres south of Peshawar at an altitude of 483 metres (1587 feet).
