= Kotli Kalan =

- Village
- Location within Pakistan
- Coordinates: 33°50′54.1″N 71°52′14.2″E
- Country: Pakistan
- Province: Khyber Pakhtunkhwa
- District: Nowshera
- Time zone: UTC+5 (PST)

Kotli Kalan is a village in the Pabbi Tehsil in the Nowshera District in Khyber Pukhtunkhwa, it neighbours the village of Saleh Khana, though Kotli Kalan was an area in Saleh Khana before a division in 1984.

== History Of Kotli Kalan/Saleh Khana ==
In 1984, there was a tribal dispute between the people of Kotli Kalan and the neighbouring village of Saleh Khana. (Kotli Kalan was not the original name of the area). Orthonym (Kotli) due to a disagreement over the water flow which connected to both villages. This dispute was settled with firearms being used and one person from Kotli Kalan was killed. The dispute was eventually resolved through a Loy Jirga (Pashtun Grand Council), in which local police, political representatives, and Mashars (leaders) from the Afridi and Yousafzai tribes, along with Mashars representing Kotli Kalan and Saleh Khana gathered in a Hujra to reach a settlement. At the time, the entire area was regarded as a single village known as Saleh Khana, With (Kotli) Kotli Kalan being an area within Saleh Khana. Following the deliberations of the Loy Jirga, the elders and representatives of both communities agreed to divide the settlement into two separate villages, establishing Saleh Khana and Kotli Kalan, (The name Kotli Kalan was developed right after the division) as distinct communities with separate boundaries. The terms of the agreement were subsequently recorded in a formal written document and signed by Haji Abdul Matheen, the Mashar of Saleh Khana, on behalf of the community. The agreement was witnessed by elders and representatives of both communities, providing a written record of the division and the establishment of Kotli Kalan as a separate village.

Haji Abdul Matheen served as the Mashar of Saleh Khana at the time of the dispute and its subsequent settlement. He also served as the Mashar of the Mohallahs of Qurban Khel, Mund Khel, and Meis Khel. He was widely regarded as one of the most prominent and highly influential leaders in the area, commanding considerable respect, authority, and standing within the local community. He had connections with the Pakistani Taliban and the Khyber Pakhtunkhwa District Council, and played a significant role in representing Saleh Khana and the communities under his leadership during the dispute and its eventual settlement.

Manawar Khan, locally known as the “Chairman,” played an important role in representing Kotli Kalan during the dispute and its subsequent settlement. At the time, Kotli Kalan did not have a formally designated Mashar and was represented by its respected local elders, who entrusted Manawar Khan to act as the community’s spokesperson and acting Mashar. Associated with Mohallah Namawar Khel and Tatar Khel, he represented Kotli Kalan’s interests, communicated its position, and took part in the negotiations that led to the settlement. As a prominent and well-connected political figure with strong relationships with senior political leaders and government authorities in Pakistan, Manawar Khan was a key and influential representative for Kotli Kalan throughout the dispute and its resolution.

=== Haji Abdul Matheen ===
Haji Abdul Matheen was a prominent Mashar and community leader of Saleh Khana. He served as the principal Mashar of the wider settlement from the 1950s until his death in the mid-1990s, when Saleh Khana and Kotli Kalan were regarded as a single community. Following the division of the two settlements in 1984, he continued to serve as the Mashar of Saleh Khana.

Throughout his tenure, Abdul Matheen played a prominent role in the traditional Jirga system and was frequently involved in the resolution of disputes within the community and surrounding areas. He also took part in various community initiatives and matters concerning local development and communal affairs. His position as a senior Mashar gave him a significant role in mediating disputes and representing the interests of the community.

In the early 1990s, Abdul Matheen was visited by journalists from the BBC in connection with the documentary Chota England (“Little England”), which examined the community and its connections with the United Kingdom.

Following his death in the mid-1990s, Abdul Matheen was the first person to be buried in the main cemetery of Saleh Khana. His Janazah(funeral prayer) was attended by Mashars and community representatives from various parts of Khyber Pakhtunkhwa. A Hujra was subsequently established in Saleh Khana in his honour, commemorating his longstanding role in the community and his contribution to local affairs.

Maliks Of Saleh Khana

The Maliks of Saleh Khana, associated with the Ghon/Gunh Khel, have traditionally served as the chiefs of the village. The recorded succession includes:

- Malik Bahadur — the first recorded Malik of Saleh Khana.
- Malik Kajeer — successor to Malik Bahadur.
- Malik Sherzada — followed Malik Kajeer.
- Malik Akbar Zada — succeeded Malik Sherzada.
- Malik Arshad Hussain — later held the position of Malik.
- Malik Noor Zada — the latest Malik named in the recorded succession.

The Malikans represented the broader traditional leadership of Saleh Khana, while individual Mohallahs and clans were represented by their own Mashars and elders.
