= Pabbi =

Pabbi تحصیل پبی پبى
- Town
- Location within Pakistan Pabbi (Pakistan)
- Coordinates: 34°00′36″N 71°47′51″E
- Country: Pakistan
- Province: Khyber Pakhtunkhwa
- District: Nowshera
- Elevation: 299 m (981 ft)

Population (2023)
  - Total: 52,701
- Time zone: UTC+5 (PST)

Pabbi (Pashto: پبى pronounce; Urdu: پبی pronounce) is a large town and headquarters of Pabbi Tehsil in the Nowshera District of Khyber-Pakhtunkhwa province of Pakistan. It is located on both sides of the Grand Trunk (GT) around 20 km from Peshawar, the capital of Khyber Pukhtunkhwa province.

== Overview ==
Pabbi town is the capital and tehsil headquarters of Pabbi tehsil in Nowshera District. It has a train station called Pabbi station and is a market town. Peshawar City is located to the west around 20 km away while Nowshera City is located to the east around 17 km away.

Pabbi is a hub of precast concrete industries located at the main GT road in Chowki Mumraiz. Currently, there are 43 precast concrete industries that are functional in Pabbi which supply different items to the entire Khyber Paktunkhwa and to some parts of the Punjab.

== Geography ==
Pabbi is surrounded by mountain range and Kabul river on the other side, which can result in hot summer and cold winter.

== Demographics ==
=== Population ===
Historical population
Year	Pop.	±% p.a.
1951	...	—
1961	7,184	—
1972	10,905	+3.87%
1981	13,331	+2.26%
1998	31,153	+5.12%
2017	55,370	+3.07%
2023	52,701	−0.82%

The population of city in 1972 was 10,905 but according to the 2023 Census of Pakistan, the population has risen to 52,701.

=== Language ===
The primary native language spoken is Pashto, though English is used in the educational institutions, while Urdu is understood throughout the city - as the national language.

== Afghan Refugees ==
Pabbi hosted one of the largest number of afghan refugees during the Soviet Afghan War in 80s with one of the world largest refugees camp in Pabbi. Still a very large number of Afghan refugees are living in Pabbi.

== Notable people ==
- Gul Hassan Khan was a former lieutenant-general and the last Commander-in-Chief of the Pakistan Army.
- Mian Iftikhat Hussain, Provincial Ex-Minister for information.
- Sareer Ahmad Khan, ex minister excise and taxation.
- Faujun Khan, born at Dagai was one of the few Muslim Judges in British India.
- Sultan Muhammad Khan, brother of Faujun Khan was among the notable Pukhtoon Companions of Olaf Caroe.
- Fazl Ur Rehman Khan, a bureaucrat in 1940s to 60s titled as Conqueror of Bajaur belonged to Pushtoon Ghari. He was the son in law of Sir Jusice Faujun Khan.
- Dost Muhammad Kamil, pashto poet and philosopher, son of Sir Justice Faujun Khan, also the cousin and brother in law of Fazl Ur Rehman Khan.[3] He was born in Dagai, and is buried in Pushtoon Ghari. He was among the earliest Pukhtoon entrants of Muhammadan Anglo Oriental College, Aligarh.
- Sher Zaman Taizi was a Pashtun writer, poet, intellectual, and journalist from Pakistan
- Sher Muhammad Khan, notable bureaucrat, ambassador, and secretary to the Govt of Pakistan was born in Dagai and buried in Pabbi Tehsil.
- Khalid Rehman Khan, eldest son of Fazl ur Rehman Khan, belonged to Pushtoon Ghari. He was twice elected as president of Peshawar High Court Bar. He was married to Dr Shama Khalid, first governor of Gilgit Baltistan.
- Zainab Rehman is a Judge Consumer Court Peshawar High Court, she is daughter of Khalid Rehman Khan and Dr Shama Khalid and granddaughter of Fazal ur Rehman Khan
- Hajra Rehman is a Judge Sessions Court Peshawar High Court, she is daughter of Khalid Rehman Khan and Dr Shama Khalid and granddaughter of Fazal ur Rehman Khan.
- Aezaz ur Rehman is son of Khalid Rehman Khan and Dr Shama Khalid and grandson of Fazal ur Rehman Khan he is working as Head of Communication with the International Committee of the Red Cross.
- Taqi ud Din, son of Fazl ur Rehman Khan and brother of Khalid Rehman belonged to Pushtoon Ghari. He was an academician. He was a student leader in the 1960's alongside Khan Abdul Qayyum Khan, and Fatima Jinnah resisting the first military dictatorship in Pakistan.
- Hamid Khan, youngest son of Fazl ur Rehman Khan, belonged to Pushtoon Ghari. He was a first class cricketer and was the first Pakistani pacer who took fourteen wickets in a first class match.
- Mazhar Sher Khan was Deputy Inspector General (DIG) Police Hazara division. He was killed on duty in 1988 at Abbottabad.
- Waqar Ahmad Khudrizi, entrepreneur.
- Captain Mohammad Iqbal Khan Shaheed (Hilal-e-Jurat) born in pushtoon Ghari Pabbi, was one of the gallant SSG Officers of Pakistan Army, who embraced martyrdom over an altitude of 21,000 feet at the world's highest battle zone 'Siachen glaciers' on September 25, 1987.
- Lieutenant General Muhammad Alam Khan Khattak, HI(M), TBt,
- Saadullah Jan Barq (born 11 May 1940 in Dagbehsod Pabbi) is a Pakistani poet, columnist, analyst and writer. Barq is fluent in Hindi, Persian, Arabic and Urdu. He began his writing career by writing for Bang-i-Haram, a local daily newspaper. He contributed editorials for Inqelab and Shahbaz. He wrote plays in both Urdu and Pashto for radio and PTV. He authored books on Pashtun ethnography and historiography
- Shamsul Mulk also served as the 24th Chief Minister of the Khyber-Pakhtunkhwa Province under the Military Government of Chief of Army Staff General Pervez Musharraf. He also served as Chairman Water and Power Development Authority WAPDA of Pakistan. He was 3rd Chairperson of Board of Governors of Sustainable Development Policy Institute.
- Mumtaz Ali Khan 1947-2021)was a famous Pashto, Urdu and Punjabi film producer, director, writer and poet. He was director of some mega hit films like Pashto film Orbal
- Hidayatullah (1940 – 28 September 2019; sometimes spelled Hidayat Ullah, also known by honorific title Ustad Hidayatullah), was a Pakistani Pashto folk musician, playback singer[3] and touring artist who primarily sung multilingual songs in numerous regional languages such as Pashto, Urdu, Hindko, Punjabi, and in Persian language.(Hidayatullah (singer).

== Education ==
Pabbi is home to several notable educational institutions. It hosts a campus of the Abdul Wali Khan University Mardan.

In addition, Pabbi has a campus of the University of Engineering and Technology Peshawar in Jelozai town, along with a Peshawar University campus for botany studies and research at the botanical garden in Azakhel.

There are two boys' degree colleges and two girls' degree colleges in Pabbi:

Government Degree College Pabbi Government Girls Degree College Pabbi Additionally, Pabbi also has a College of Management Sciences, which provides specialized education in business and management fields.

== See also ==
- Pabbi Tehsil
- Nowshera District
