= Mufti Muhammad Abbas =

Pakistani politician

- مفتی محمد عباس

17th Caretaker Chief Minister of the North-West Frontier Province
- In office 19 July 1993 – 19 October 1993
- Preceded by: Mir Afzal Khan
- Succeeded by: Pir Sabir Shah

Personal details
- Born: 1921 Khyber Pakhtunkhwa, Pakistan
- Died: 4 August 2012 (aged 90–91)
- Children: Fauzia Abbas and Samia Abbas

Mufti Muhammad Abbas (12 September 1921 - 4 August 2012) was a Pakistani bureaucrat from the Khyber Pakhtunkhwa province of Pakistan. He served as the 17th Caretaker Chief Minister of the Khyber Pakhtunkhwa from 19 July 1993 to 19 October 1993.

Political offices
Preceded by Mir Afzal Khan	Caretaker Chief Minister of Khyber-Pakhtunkhwa; 1993	Succeeded by Pir Sabir Shah
