= Haider Khan Hoti =

Pakistani politician

- امیر حیدر خان ہوتی

Chief Minister of Khyber Pakhtunkhwa
- In office 31 March 2008 – 20 March 2013
- Preceded by: Shams ul Mulk
- Succeeded by: Tariq Pervez Khan

Member of the National Assembly of Pakistan
- In office 13 August 2018 – 10 August 2023
- Constituency: NA-21 (Mardan-II)
- In office 1 June 2013 – 31 May 2018
- Constituency: NA-9 (Mardan-I)

Member of the Provincial Assembly of Khyber Pakhtunkhwa
- In office 20 March 2008 – 20 March 2013
- Constituency: PK-23 Mardan

Personal details
- Born: 5 February 1971 (age 55) Mardan, Khyber Pakhtunkhwa, Pakistan
- Other political affiliations: ANP (2008-Present)
- Parent: Azam Khan Hoti (father)
- Relatives: Asfandyar Wali Khan (maternal uncle)
- Education: Aitchison College; Edwardes College Peshawar

Ameer Haider Khan Hoti (Urdu: امیر حیدر خان ہوتی; Pashto: امير حېدر خان هوتي) is a Pakistani Pashtun politician who was the Chief Minister of Khyber Pakhtunkhwa from 2008 to 2013. During his government, the province was renamed from "North-West Frontier Province" to "Khyber Pakhtunkhwa." Hoti had also been a member of the National Assembly of Pakistan from August 2018 till August 2023 and from June 2013 to May 2018. He is the Senior Vice President of the Awami National Party (ANP).

== Personal life and education ==
Hoti was born on 5 February 1971 to the former federal minister of Khyber Pakhtunkhwa, Azam Khan Hoti. Hoti is a nephew of Asfandyar Wali Khan, the president of ANP. He has two sons and one daughter.

He received his education from Aitchison College, and graduated from Edwardes College Peshawar.

== Political career ==
Hoti started his political career in 1990.

He ran for the Provincial Assembly of Khyber Pakhtunkhwa from Mardan constituency in the 2002 Pakistani general election, but was unsuccessful.

He was elected for the first time to the Provincial Assembly of Khyber Pakhtunkhwa from PK-23 Mardan constituency in the 2008 Pakistani general election. Following the election, he was elected as the Chief Minister of Khyber Pakhtunkhwa in March 2008 where he remained until March 2013. He is considered as the youngest and the longest-serving elected chief minister of Khyber Pakhtunkhwa. His cabinet consisted of 25-members, including Bashir Ahmad Bilour and Rahim Dad Khan as senior ministers. The government alliance consisted of the ANP, PPP, and two independents.

He was elected to the National Assembly of Pakistan from NA-9 (Mardan-I) in the 2013 Pakistani general election.

In 2014, he was elected as the provincial president of Awami National Party (ANP).

He was re-elected to the National Assembly as a candidate of ANP from Constituency NA-21 (Mardan-II) in the 2018 Pakistani general election. He was also elected to the Provincial Assembly on the same day in the 2018 Khyber Pakhtunkhwa provincial election as a candidate of ANP from PK-53 Mardan-VI. However, he chose to retain his National Assembly seat and vacate his Provincial Assembly seat.

Political offices
| Preceded by Shams ul Mulk | Chief Minister of Khyber Pakhtunkhwa; 2008 – 2013 | Succeeded by Tariq Pervez Khan (Caretaker) |
