= Ikhtiar Wali Khan =

Pakistani politician

Member of the Provincial Assembly of Khyber Pakhtunkhwa
- In office 19 February 2021 – 18 January 2023
- Constituency: PK-63 (Nowshera-III)

Personal details
- Party: PMLN (2021-present)

Ikhtiar Wali Khan is a Pakistani politician from Nowshera District who had been a member of the Provincial Assembly of Khyber Pakhtunkhwa from February 2021 till January 2023.

== Political career ==
He was elected to the Provincial Assembly of Khyber Pakhtunkhwa as a candidate of Pakistan Muslim League-N from Constituency PK-63 (Nowshera-III) in a 2021 by-election.
