= Saleh Khana =

Coordinates: 33.8384°N 71.8660°E

Saleh Khana صالح خانه
- Village
- Interactive map of Saleh Khana
- Country: Pakistan
- Province: Khyber Pakhtunkhwa
- Main languages: Pashto
- Website: salehkhana.com

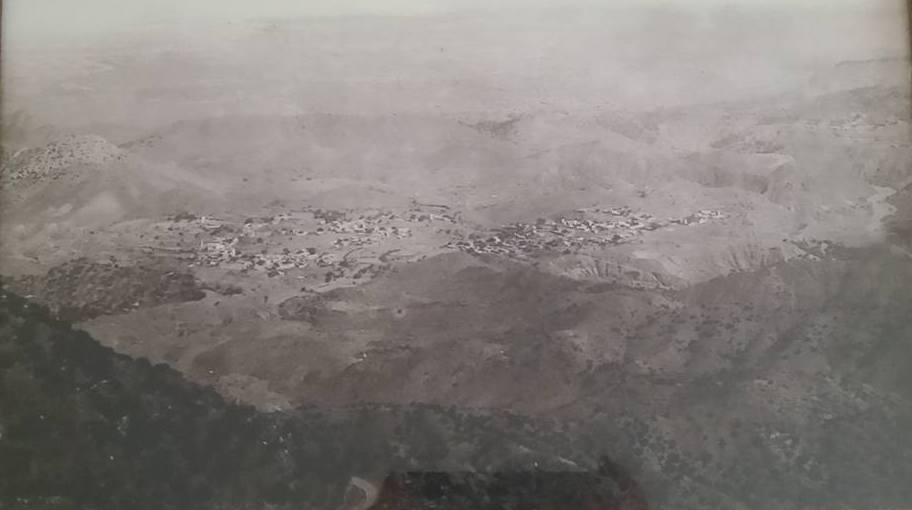
Cherat Saleh Khana 1926

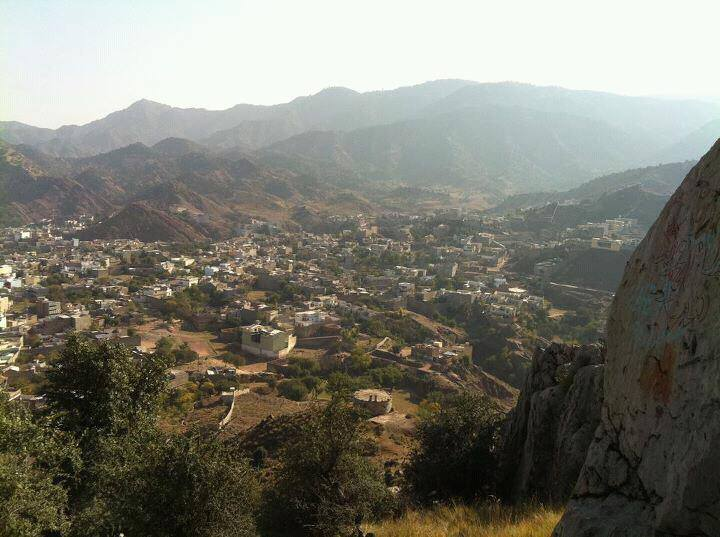
Saleh Khana Village

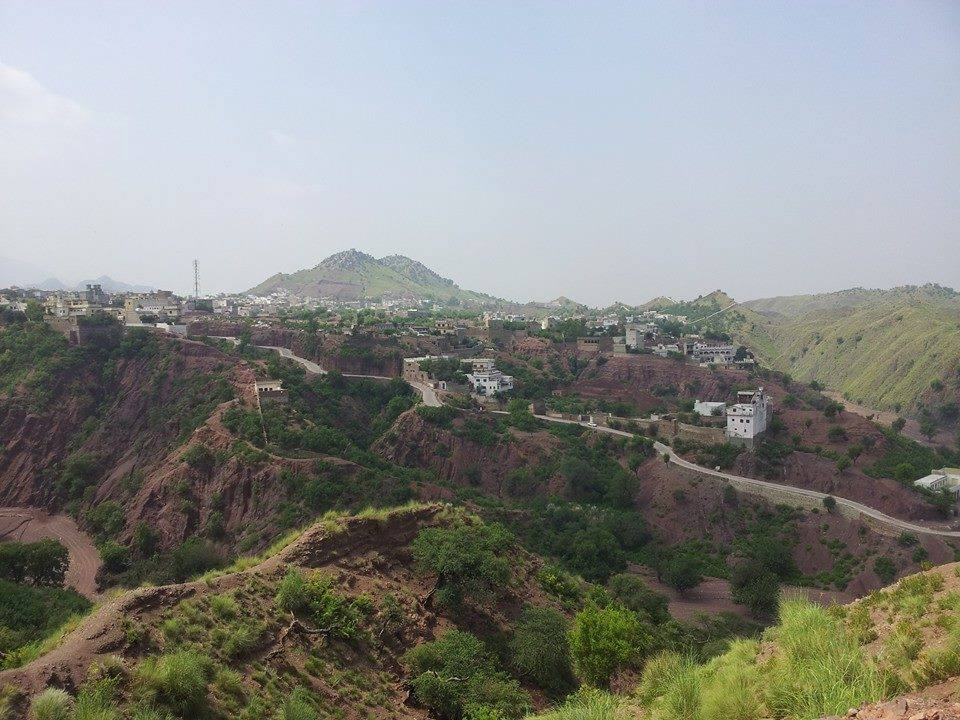
Mount Pakka

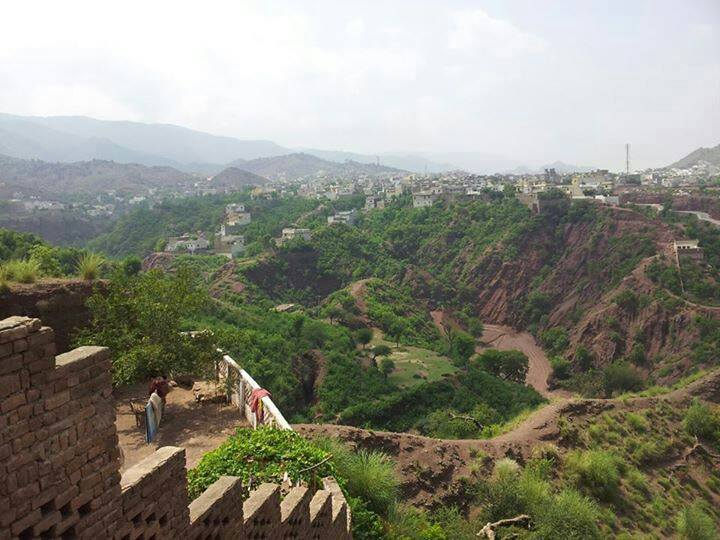

Saleh Khana is a large village in the Nowshera District of Khyber Pakhtunkhwa, Pakistan located just below the Cherat mountains.

The name Saleh Khana derives from Arabic and roughly translates to "Weapon Depot", "Armour Depot" originating from the Arabic Word "Silah" and "Khana" a Persian word for home, place.

The village is inhabited by Pashtuns, of the Khattak tribe and Pashto is the main language spoken throughout the village.

Like other parts of Pakistan, many people live overseas for work, the people of this village are spread throughout the world, with 80% living abroad. Among the countries where one can find residents of this village are, to name a few, the UK, USA, UAE, Canada, Australia, and Malaysia.

The majority can be found in the United Kingdom, mainly in Birmingham, Manchester, and Aylesbury. This has earned the village the name of "little london" due to most of its residents having dual citizenship in the UK. Originally, the residents moved aboard during the early 1960s to earn and send income back home. However, as time passed, many decided to stay abroad settling with dual citizenship and regularly travelling back and forth occasionally.. There is also a small sizeable community in Canada.

The village is surrounded by the Cherat mountains range. Within the mountains range, just above the village, is a former British Hill station or cantonment that was used in 1861 and is currently occupied by the Pakistani army. It mainly consists of a training ground for the Pakistani SSG. It is off limits to the public and hosts the world's largest zipline in South Asia which covers ranges of 1.6 km located at the Khattak mountain ranges.

It is the only village in Pakistan with multiple banks.

== People & History ==
The people of this village are primarily Pashtuns, an ethnic group located in both North West Pakistan & Afghanistan.

The people of Saleh Khana, belong to the Khattak Pashtun Tribe.

In 1984, there was a tribal dispute between the people of Saleh Khana and the neighbouring village of "Kotli Kalan" (Kotli Kalan was not the original name of the area). Orthonym (Kotli) due to a disagreement over the water flow which connected to both villages. This dispute was settled with firearms being used and one person from neighbouring village Kotli Kalan was killed. The dispute was eventually resolved through a Loy Jirga (Pashtun Grand Council), in which local police, political representatives, and Mashars(leaders) from the Afridi and Yousafzai tribes, along with Mashars representing Saleh Khana and Kotli Kalan gathered in a Hujra to reach a settlement. At the time, the entire area was regarded as a single village known as Saleh Khana, With (Kotli) Kotli Kalan being an area within Saleh Khana. Following the deliberations of the Loy Jirga, the elders and representatives of both communities agreed to divide the settlement into two separate villages, establishing Saleh Khana and Kotli Kalan, (The name Kotli Kalan was developed right after the division) as distinct communities with separate boundaries. The terms of the agreement were subsequently recorded in a formal written document and signed by Haji Abdul Matheen, the Mashar of Saleh Khana, on behalf of the community. The agreement was witnessed by elders and representatives of both communities, providing a written record of the division and the establishment of Kotli Kalan as a separate village.

Haji Abdul Matheen served as the Mashar of Saleh Khana at the time of the dispute and its subsequent settlement. He also served as the Mashar of the Mohallahs of Qurban Khel, Mund Khel, and Meis Khel. He was widely regarded as one of the most prominent and highly influential leaders in the area, commanding considerable respect, authority, and standing within the local community. He had connections with the Pakistani Taliban and the Khyber Pakhtunkhwa District Council, and played a significant role in representing Saleh Khana and the communities under his leadership during the dispute and its eventual settlement.

Manawar Khan, locally known as the “Chairman,” played an important role in representing Kotli Kalan during the dispute and its subsequent settlement. At the time, Kotli Kalan did not have a formally designated Mashar and was represented by its respected local elders, who entrusted Manawar Khan to act as the community’s spokesperson and acting Mashar. Associated with Mohallah Namawar Khel and Tatar Khel, he represented Kotli Kalan’s interests, communicated its position, and took part in the negotiations that led to the settlement. As a prominent and well-connected political figure with strong relationships with senior political leaders and government authorities in Pakistan, Manawar Khan was a key and influential representative for Kotli Kalan throughout the dispute and its resolution.

=== Haji Abdul Matheen ===
Haji Abdul Matheen was a prominent Mashar and community leader of Saleh Khana. He served as the principal Mashar of the wider settlement from the 1950s until his death in the mid-1990s, when Saleh Khana and Kotli Kalan were regarded as a single community. Following the division of the two settlements in 1984, he continued to serve as the Mashar of Saleh Khana.

Throughout his tenure, Abdul Matheen played a prominent role in the traditional Jirga system and was frequently involved in the resolution of disputes within the community and surrounding areas. He also took part in various community initiatives and matters concerning local development and communal affairs. His position as a senior Mashar gave him a significant role in mediating disputes and representing the interests of the community.

In the early 1990s, Abdul Matheen was visited by journalists from the BBC in connection with the documentary Chota England (“Little England”), which examined the community and its connections with the United Kingdom.

Following his death in the mid-1990s, Abdul Matheen was the first person to be buried in the main cemetery of Saleh Khana. His Janazah (funeral prayer) was attended by Mashars and community representatives from various parts of Khyber Pakhtunkhwa. A Hujra was subsequently established in Saleh Khana in his honour, commemorating his longstanding role in the community and his contribution to local affairs.

Maliks Of Saleh Khana

The Maliks of Saleh Khana, associated with the Ghon/Gunh Khel, have traditionally served as the chiefs of the village. The recorded succession includes:

- Malik Bahadur — the first recorded Malik of Saleh Khana.
- Malik Kajeer — successor to Malik Bahadur.
- Malik Sherzada — followed Malik Kajeer.
- Malik Akbar Zada — succeeded Malik Sherzada.
- Malik Arshad Hussain — later held the position of Malik.
- Malik Noor Zada — the latest Malik named in the recorded succession.

The Malikans represented the broader traditional leadership of Saleh Khana, while individual Mohallahs and clans were represented by their own Mashars and elders.

Pashtuns of this village originally migrated from their homeland in the Tirah valley in present day Khyber Pakhtunkhwa, to their current village during the mid 17th century.

After brutal tribal wars in the 17th century the Oriya Khel tribe migrated east and settled in Jalozai in Khattak tribe territories. Great hostility from surrounding clans lead to a major blood feud between the Oriya Khel and Khattak clans.

The feud was so big that a Loy Jirga (Pashtun grand council) took place in order to end the bloodshed; as a result of this jirga to end the tribal feuds, the Oriya Khel were given the current lands that they now reside in today, hence they moved up into and inhabited the mountainous region of Cherat.

Today 80% of the inhabitants of Saleh Khana have migrated to developed countries around the world, primarily to Europe, United States of America, Canada and the United Kingdom in the Birmingham and Ayelsbury regions; during the 19th and 20th century in order to seek work and send money back home to the village.

However, as time has gone by a lot of families have decided to stay and reside in the UK, US, and European countries and now view themselves with a dual identity.

== Language ==
The language predominantly spoken in Saleh Khana is Pashto.

Central Pashto has a different vocabulary and sound than Northern Pashto dialect, which is spoken in Peshawar, Mardan, and Swat, mainly by the Yusufzai tribe.

Slight differences occur however since Saleh Khana is relatively close to Peshawar, a lot of the inhabitants can understand the Northern Dialects which is considered standard Pashto used in books, letters, also called "Kitaabi Pashto." Therefore, the Pashto spoken in Saleh Khana is unique on its own terms.

== Tribes and Clans ==
Saleh Khana is inhabited by the Khattak tribe of the Pashtuns. The tribe is then divided into clans (khels). These are:

- Amin Khel
- Amirjan Khel
- Gunr Khel
- Tarkan khel
- Namawar Khel
- Duran Khel
- Shatar Khel
- Qurban Khel
- Mund Khel
- Mais Khel
- Tattar Khel
- Gund Khel
- Andaz kaley

Each clan has its own Mashar (Leader) which is their clan's representative in a Pashtun council called the jirga, to settle village disputes and promote progress.

Every clan has its own Mohallah and every Mohalla has its own Masjid and own representatives for a tribal/clan meeting which is called a Jirga in Pashto.
