= Pir Sabir Shah =

Pakistani politician

Pir Sabir Shah پیر صابر شاہ

Member of the Senate of Pakistan
- In office 18 March 2018 – March 2024

18th Chief Minister of the North-West Frontier Province
- In office 20 October 1993 – 25 February 1994
- Governor: Khurshid Ali Khan
- Preceded by: Mufti Muhammad Abbas
- Succeeded by: Aftab Ahmad Khan Sherpao

Advisor to the Prime Minister
- In office 1997–1999
- Prime Minister: Nawaz Sharif

Personal details
- Born: Syed Muhammad Sabir Shah; 13 March 1955 (age 71) Sirikot, NWFP, Pakistan
- Party: PMLN
- Children: 2 sons, 1 daughter
- Relatives: Syed Muhammad Tayyab Shah (father)

Syed Muhammad Sabir Shah, or more commonly as Pir Sabir Shah, is a politician from the Khyber Pakhtunkhwa province of Pakistan. He served as the 18th Chief Minister of the province from 20 October 1993 to 25 February 1994. He was an advisor to the Prime Minister of Pakistan Nawaz Sharif from 1997 to 1999. He served as a Senator from Khyber Pakhtunkhwa.

== Family ==
Pir Sabir Shah hails from a religious family of Syeds settled in Sirikot in Haripur. He belongs to the Mashwani tribe. They are linked to the Qadiri Sufi order. His lineage is traced to Ali in 43 chains through Gesudaraz.

== Education ==
Pir Sabir Shah studied at a school in Sirikot. He completed his bachelor's degree from Government College, Abbottabad, then earned a Bachelor of Arts degree from University of Peshawar. He earned a master's degree in Islamic studies after graduation. He then enrolled at the Institute of Modern Languages in Islamabad and obtained a four-year degree in Arabic language and Islamic studies. He then enrolled at the International Islamic University for higher studies and successfully completed higher studies in Daura and Fiqh.

== Political career ==
Pir Sabir Shah contested the 1985 elections and won as an independent candidate. He was asked by the Muslim League to join them. A grand jirga was called at Shetalu Shareef, Sirikot. They agreed to let him join the Pakistan Muslim League. He won elections in 1988, 1990, 1993, and 1997 contesting from his constituency PF-43 (Provincial Frontier −43) of Haripur.

He served as the 18th Chief Minister of the province from 20 October 1993 to 25 February 1994. He served as the chairman of the Senate Standing Committee on Water Resources.

Political offices
Preceded by Mufti Muhammad Abbas (Caretaker)	Chief Minister of Khyber-Pakhtunkhwa; 1993–1994	Succeeded by Aftab Ahmad Sherpao
