= PK-88 Nowshera-IV =

Pakistani electoral district

- Constituency for the Khyber Pakhtunkhwa Assembly
- Region: Nowshera Tehsil (partly) including Nowshera city and Cantt of Nowshera District

Current constituency
- Party: Pakistan Tehreek-e-Insaf
- Member(s): Liaquat Khan Khattak
- Created from: PK-13 Nowshera-II (2002-2018); PK-64 Nowshera-IV (2018-2023)

PK-88 Nowshera-IV (پی کے-88 نوشہرہ-4) is a constituency for the Khyber Pakhtunkhwa Assembly of the Khyber Pakhtunkhwa province of Pakistan.

== See also ==
- PK-87 Nowshera-III
- PK-89 Nowshera-V
