= PK-87 Nowshera-III =

Pakistani electoral district

- Constituency for the Khyber Pakhtunkhwa Assembly
- Region: Jehangira, Pabbi and Nowshera Tehsils (partly) in Nowshera District

Current constituency
- Party: Pakistan Muslim League (N)
- Member(s): Ikhtiar Wali Khan
- Created from: PK-16 Nowshera-V (2002-2018); PK-63 Nowshera-III (2018-2023)

PK-87 Nowshera-III (پی کے-87 نوشہرہ-3) is a constituency for the Khyber Pakhtunkhwa Assembly of the Khyber Pakhtunkhwa province of Pakistan.

== See also ==
- PK-86 Nowshera-II
- PK-88 Nowshera-IV
