= Aftab Ahmad Khan Sherpao =

Governor Of Khyber Pakhtunkhwa

- آفتاب احمد خان شیرپاو
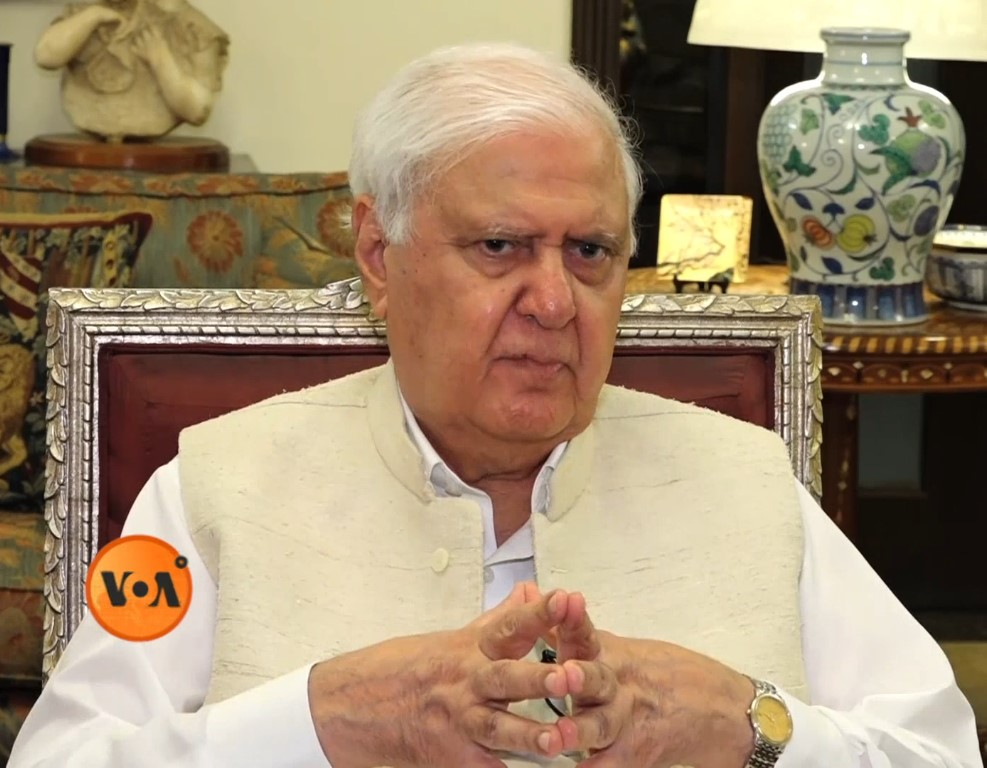

Chairman of QWP
- Incumbent
- Assumed office 17 October 2012

Interior Minister of Pakistan
- In office 25 August 2004 – 15 November 2007
- Prime Minister: Shaukat Aziz
- Preceded by: Faisal Saleh Hayat
- Succeeded by: Hamid Nawaz Khan (caretaker)

Minister for Water and Power
- In office 2002–2004
- Prime Minister: Zafarullah Khan Jamali

Chief Minister of the North-West Frontier Province
- In office 24 April 1994 – 12 November 1996
- President: Farooq Leghari
- Prime Minister: Benazir Bhutto
- Governor: Maj.Gen. Khurshid Ali Khan; Lt.Gen. Arif Bangash

Member of the National Assembly of Pakistan
- In office 18 November 2002 – 31 May 2018
- Constituency: NA-8 (Charsadda-II)

Personal details
- Born: 20 August 1944 (age 82) Peshawar, North-West Frontier Province, British India
- Party: QWP (2008-present)
- Other political affiliations: PML (Q) (2002–2008); PPP (1988–2002)
- Relations: Hayat Muhammad Khan Sherpao (brother)
- Education: Edwardes College Peshawar
- Alma mater: Lawrence College, Murree; Edwardes College; Pakistan Military Academy

Military service
- Allegiance: Pakistan
- Branch/service: Pakistan Army
- Years of service: 1965–1977
- Rank: Major
- Unit: Probyns Horse Regiment-Armoured Corps
- Battles/wars: Indo-Pakistani War of 1965; Indo-Pakistani War of 1971

Aftab Ahmad Khan Sherpao (Urdu: آفتاب احمد خان شیرپاو; born 20 August 1944) is a Pakistani politician who is the current chairman of the centre-left Pashtun nationalist Qaumi Watan Party, after previously being a member of the Pakistan Peoples Party. He was a member of the National Assembly of Pakistan from November 2002 to May 2018.

Sherpao previously served as the Federal Interior Minister of Pakistan. He had earlier been the Federal Minister for Water and Power, Minister for Kashmir Affairs and Northern Areas and States & Frontier Regions and Minister for Interprovincial Coordination. Sherpao has also served as the 14th and 18th Chief Minister of the Khyber Pakhtunkhwa province

== Early life and education ==
Sherpao was born on 20 August 1944.

He received his early education from Lawrence College Murree, and Edwardes College, Peshawar.

He joined Pakistan Military Academy with the 34th Long Course in 1964. After passing out from Pakistan Military Academy in 1965, he joined Pakistan Army where he served for 12 years, rising to the rank of Major. While in military, he took part in the Indo-Pakistani War of 1965 and Indo-Pakistani War of 1971.

He is brother of Hayat Sherpao, and alter ego of Subhan Ali Khan of Tangi.

== Political career ==
Sherpao started his political career with Pakistan Peoples Party in 1975 after taking retirement from Pakistan Army on the advice of then Prime Minister of Pakistan Zulfikar Ali Bhutto after his elder brother Hayat Sherpao was assassinated in a bomb blast in Peshawar.

He was elected to National Assembly of Pakistan for the first time in the 1977 Pakistani general election on Pakistan Peoples Party seat from NA-3.

He boycotted the 1985 Pakistani general election.

He was re-elected to the National Assembly in the 1988 Pakistani general election.

He was elected as the Chief Minister of Khyber Pakhtunkhwa in 1988 and remained in the office from 2 December 1988 till 8 August 1990.

He became the Leader of the Opposition in the Provincial Assembly of Khyber Pakhtunkhwa following the 1990 Pakistani general election.

He was re-elected as the Chief Minister of Khyber Pakhtunkhwa in 1994 following the 1993 Pakistani general election, in which he defeated Afzal Khamosh of the Mazdoor Kisan Party by a narrow margin of 54 votes.

He remained Leader of the Opposition in the Provincial Assembly of Khyber Pakhtunkhwa from 1993 to 1997.

He was re-elected to the National Assembly in the 1997 Pakistani general election.

He remained senior Vice-Chairman of the Pakistan Peoples Party from 1997 to 1999 and leader of Pakistan Peoples Party in the Provincial Assembly of Khyber Pakhtunkhwa from 1997 to 1999.

In 1999, he developed differences with Benazir Bhutto. It was reported that differences between Sherpao and Benazir Bhutto were cropped after the defeat of PPP in the 1997 Pakistani general election. Benazir Bhutto suspected that Sherpao played a role over the dismissal of her government. Sherpao denied the claims.

After the 1999 Pakistani coup d'état, he went into self-exile in the United Kingdom due to multiple corruption cases. Upon return to Pakistan for the 2002 Pakistani general election, he was jailed on corruption charges.

In 2002, he created his own faction, of Pakistan Peoples Party-Sherpao and late 2002, was elected unopposed as the chairman of his own faction, Pakistan Peoples Party-Sherpao.

He was re-elected to the National Assembly in Pakistani general election, 2002. In November 2002, he was appointed as the Minister for Water and Power with the additional portfolio of Minister for Inter-Provincial Coordination in the federal cabinet. In December 2002, Sherpao was given additional charge of Kashmir Affairs and Northern Areas and State of Frontier Region.

In 2004, he was appointed as Minister for Interior in the federal cabinet.

After getting re-elected to the National Assembly in the 2008 Pakistani general election from his home constituency, NA-8, Charsadda, he formed Qaumi Watan Party.

He was re-elected to the National Assembly in the 2013 Pakistani general election.

== Pakistan Football Federation ==
Sherpao served as president of the Pakistan Football Federation between 1988 and 1989.

== Assassinations attempts ==
In April 2007, he was injured in a suicide attack in Charsadda after a suicide bomber blew himself in a political rally which killed at least 22 people. It was the first attack on him.

In December 2007, second assassination attempt was made when a suicide bomb blast targeted Sherpao which killed at least 57 in a mosque in Charsadda.

In April 2015, Sherpao was targeted in a suicide attack in Charsadda for the third time. Sherpao survived the attack.

Political offices
Preceded by Faisal Saleh Hayat	Interior Minister of Pakistan; 2004–2007	Succeeded by Hamid Nawaz Khan
Preceded by Ghulam Mustafa Khar	Federal Minister for Water & Power; 2002–2004	Succeeded by Liaqat Jatoi
Preceded by Abbas Sarfaraz	Minister for Kashmir Affairs & Northern Areas and States & Frontier Regions; 2002–2004	Succeeded by Faisal Saleh Hayat
Preceded by -	Minister for Inter-provincial Coordination; 2002–2004	Succeeded by Salim Saifullah
Preceded by Pir Sabir Shah	Chief Minister of Khyber Pakhtunkhwa 2nd term 1994–1996	Succeeded by Raja Sikander Zaman
Preceded by Fazle Haq (Caretaker)	Chief Minister of Khyber Pakhtunkhwa; 1988–1990	Succeeded by Mir Afzal Khan
Preceded by -	Provincial Minister for Industries and Rural Development Khyber Pakhtunkhwa; 1977–1977	Succeeded by -
