= Chapri, Nowshera =

Chapri
- Location within Pakistan
- Coordinates: 33.822617°N 71.856807°E
- Country: Pakistan
- Province: Khyber Pakhtunkhwa
- District: Nowshera District
- Elevation: 1,089 m (3,573 ft)
- Time zone: UTC+5 (PST)
- Calling code: 0923

Chapri (چھپری) is a hill station in Pabbi Tehsil of Nowshera District, Khyber Pakhtunkhwa province of Pakistan. Chapri, locally known as Sapara in Pashto and commonly referred to as Chapri (چھپری) in Urdu and English, is a picturesque hill village located in Pabbi Tehsil of Nowshera District, in the Khyber Pakhtunkhwa (KP) Province of Pakistan. Nestled among rugged mountains and beautiful natural landscapes, Chapri is considered one of the most remote yet charming settlements of the district.

Situated approximately 27 kilometers (17 miles) from the Main Grand Trunk (GT) Road Pabbi Station (باب خٹک). Situated away from urban centers, the village is located in an elevated hilly area, featuring high-altitude views and a temperate climate characteristic of regional hill stations.

== Geography and Surroundings ==
Chapri is encircled by prominent mountain ranges that enhance its natural beauty and contribute to its distinct geographical character. The village shares its boundaries with several neighboring settlements, including:

Dak Ismail Khel Saleh Khana Spin Khak Jaroba Cherat Cantonment

Its strategic location among these communities has historically connected Chapri with nearby villages through cultural, social, and economic ties.

== Historical Background ==
The origins of Chapri can be traced back to Dak Ismail Khel, from where the village gradually evolved and expanded into an independent settlement. Over time, families migrated and established homes in the area, contributing to the village’s growth and development while maintaining strong links with their ancestral roots.

== Population and Community Life ==
Although Chapri is relatively small in terms of population compared to other villages of the region, it is known for its close-knit and hospitable community. The residents uphold traditional Pashtun values, emphasizing respect, hospitality, and strong family relationships.

The village reflects a blend of traditional rural life and modern aspirations, with many residents pursuing education and professional careers both within Pakistan and abroad.

== Economy and Livelihood ==
The people of Chapri are engaged in a diverse range of occupations, which contribute to the economic wellbeing of the community. These include:

Small and medium-scale businesses Agriculture and livestock-related activities Government and private-sector employment Skilled and professional services Overseas employment in the Middle East and other countries

Remittances sent by residents working abroad play an important role in supporting local families and improving living standards within the village.

== Cultural Significance ==
Chapri represents the rich cultural heritage of the Pashtun communities of Khyber Pakhtunkhwa. Traditional customs, local gatherings, religious events, and community cooperation remain important aspects of everyday life. The village's scenic surroundings, strong social bonds, and historical roots make it a unique and valued part of Nowshera District.

== Conclusion ==
Chapri is a community deeply connected to its history, culture, and natural environment. Surrounded by mountains and held by the resilience of its people, Chapri stands as an example of rural life in Khyber Pakhtunkhwa, where tradition and progress continue to coexist.

== History ==
=== British Period ===
During British rule Cherat & Chapri was important as a hill cantonment and sanitarium for British troops in what was then the Nowshera Tehsil of the Peshawar District of British India.

Cherat was first used as a sanitarium for troops in 1861 and was used during the hot weather as a health station for the British troops who were quartered in the hot and malarious valley of Peshawar. It was declared a cantonment in 1886. The cantonment commands a view of the whole of the Peshawar valley on one side, and on the other of a portion of the Khwarra valley in Peshawar District, and of Kohat District as far as the Indus.

=== Pre historical origin ===
People living here are migrants from D. I. Khel 170 years back. Initially in Shami Khel, most made a living by serving in Britain Military's cantonment services but dwelling followed completely some time in 1850. and has a history belonging to Kohat Ismail Khel Baba buried in Kohat, the father of Ismail Khels.

== Historical places at Chapri ==
Among the Historical places are the following:

- Cherat Pumping Station at Chapri Gate
- Peer Safar Hill Station
- Naki Kote Pumping Station at Chapri
- Jan Mohammad Shaheed
- Zalabadeen Kamar Waterfall
- Halwat Shaheed
- FC Post
- Chapri Police Choki
- Sulimani Ghaar, a part of (Kohe Suliman)
- Talab
- Beautiful Play Ground.

== Islamic Dar-ul-Uloom Female ==
Omme Hakeem Islamic Dar-ul-Uloom for Female, and Iqra Roza Tul Atfal.

== Islamic Dar-ul-Uloom ==
Aamir Khattak Islamic Dar-ul-Uloom.

== Chapri Library ==
Chapri Library.

== Education ==
- Govt Primary School Chapri (boys)
- Govt Primary School Chapri (girls)
- Iqra Modal High School Chapri
- Iqra (Rozatul Atfal) School Chapri
- APSACS Cherat (Chapri).

== Sports ==
The youth of Chapri are very active in every field of sports but unfortunately there are few facilities available for their use. However, cricket, football, and Gulli dande (push dande) are sports played in Chapri.
