= Pervez Khattak =

Pakistani politician (born 1950)

- پرویز خٹک
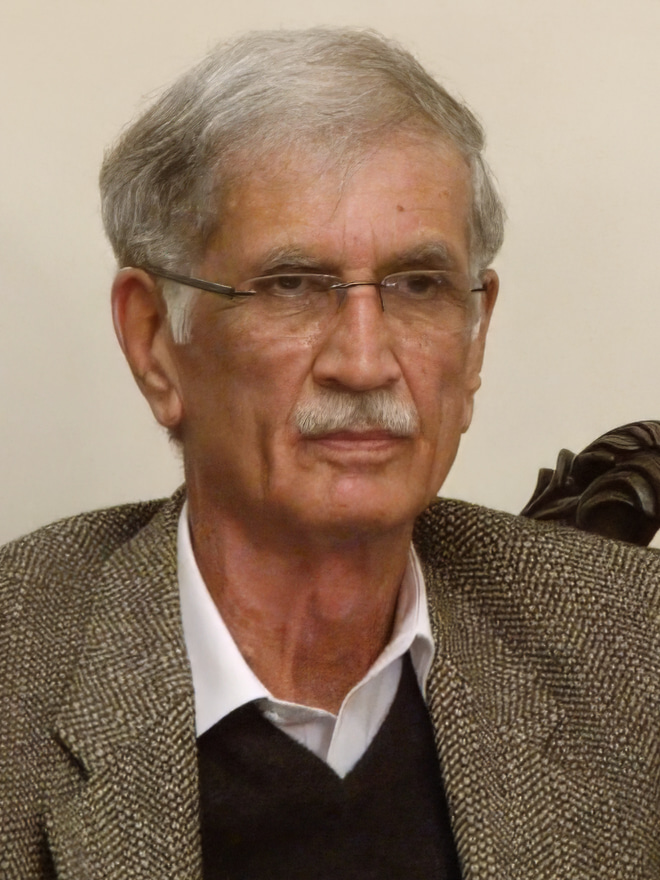
- Khattak as chief minister of Khyber Pakhtunkhwa

Minister of Defence
- In office 20 August 2018 – 10 April 2022
- President: Mamnoon Hussain; Arif Alvi
- Prime Minister: Imran Khan
- Preceded by: Naeem Khalid Lodhi (caretaker)
- Succeeded by: Khawaja Asif

22nd Chief Minister of Khyber Pakhtunkhwa
- In office 31 May 2013 – 6 June 2018
- Governor: Shaukatullah Khan; Mehtab Ahmed Khan Abbasi
- Preceded by: Tariq Pervez Khan (caretaker)
- Succeeded by: Dost Muhammad Khan (caretaker)

Member of the National Assembly of Pakistan
- In office 13 August 2018 – 22 Juanry 2023
- Constituency: NA-25 (Nowshera-I)

Provincial Minister of Industries and Production
- In office 2010–2012
- In office 1993–1996

Provincial Minister of Irrigation
- In office 1988–1990

Provincial Assembly of Khyber Pakhtunkhwa
- In office 31 May 2013 – 28 May 2018
- Constituency: PK-13 Nowshera-II
- In office 2008–2012
- Constituency: PF-13 (Nowshera-II)
- In office 1993–1996
- Constituency: PF-10 Peshawar-X
- In office 1988–1990

Advisor To Prime Minister For Interior
- Incumbent
- Assumed office 8 March 2025
- President: Asif Ali Zardari
- Prime Minister: Shehbaz Sharif
- Minister: Mohsin Naqvi

Personal details
- Born: 1 January 1950 (age 76) Manki, Khyber Pakhtunkhwa Khyber Pakhtunkhwa, Pakistan
- Party: PTI-P (2023-present)
- Other political affiliations: PTI (2011-2023); QWP (2002-2011); IND (1997-2001); PPP (1988-1997); PML (1985-1988); IND (1983-1985)
- Children: 6
- Relatives: Liaquat Khan Khattak (brother); Ibrahim Khattak (son); Nafeesa Inayatullah Khan Khattak (sister-in-law); Sajida Zulfiqar (niece); Nasrullah Khan Khattak (cousin)
- Education: Pak-AIMS, Lahore; Aitchison College, Lahore; Gordon College, Rawalpindi
- Occupation: Politician
- Cabinet: Imran Khan government Second Shehbaz Sharif government

Pervez Khan Khattak (Note: Urdu: پرویز خان خٹک; Pashto: پروېز خان خټک) (born 1 January 1950) is a Pakistani politician who served as the minister of defence from 2018 to 2022. He also served as the 22nd chief minister of Khyber Pakhtunkhwa from 2013 to 2018. Khattak was previously a member of the National Assembly (MNA) from 2018 to 2023, and a Member of the Provincial Assembly of Khyber Pakhtunkhwa from Nowshera District.

He was a senior member of the PTI until July 2023, when he formed his breakaway faction, the PTI-P. On 12 February 2024, he left the chairmanship of the PTI-P and took a break from politics.

Khattak has reformist views on Pakistan's political system. He prioritised accountability in his own government, increased education enrollment, and instituted reforms in the police and security sector and an anti-polio campaign. He plans infrastructure projects; such as improving the transportation network. He also planned to revive the local economy by helping to rebuild tourism in the area. He planned industrialisation of the economy and a reduction in red tape.

== Early life and education ==
Pervez Khattak was born on 1 January 1950 in the village of Manki Sharif to a government contractor Hastam Khan Khattak, who was considered among the leading builders in the pre-partition subcontinent. He belongs to the Khattak tribe of Pashtuns. Pervez Khattak received his early education at the Manki Sharif Primary School, high school at Aitchison College, Lahore and later at Pak-AIMS. He was also a political worker for PPP in the past.

Khattak married twice. He is the father of three sons and two daughters. His eldest son, Ishaq Khattak, after completing his education, is managing the company that his grandfather had established before the creation of Pakistan. Another son, Ibrahim Khan Khattak, is a member of the Provincial Assembly of Khyber Pakhtunkhwa, and is receiving his education in the United Kingdom. Khattak's cousin, Nasrullah Khan Khattak, was also chief minister of KP during Zulfikar Ali Bhutto's rule as the prime minister of Pakistan.

== Political career ==
Khattak started his political career in 1983 as a member of the district council. He has served as once the Irrigation minister of Khyber Pakhtunkhwa in 1988 and twice as the minister of Industries and Production in 1993 and 2010.

He ran for the National Assembly of Pakistan in the 1990 Pakistani general election from NA-4 Peshawar-IV as a candidate of the Pakistan Democratic Alliance, but was unsuccessful. He received 25,722 votes and was defeated by Ajmal Khattak, a candidate of the Awami National Party (ANP).

Khattak was elected to the Provincial Assembly of the North-West Frontier Province in the 2008 North-West Frontier Province provincial election from PF-13 Nowshera-II as a candidate of the Pakistan Peoples Party (Sherpao) (PPP-S). He received 15,168 votes and defeated Mian Yahya Shah of the Pakistan Muslim League (Q) (PML(Q)).

Khattak relinquished his elected post as the secretary-general of Pakistan Tehreek-e-Insaf (PTI) on 25 September 2013 to Jahangir Tareen.

As chief minister, he faced serious issues like terrorism, extremism, economic downfall, and social upheaval. Under his leadership, the province embarked upon many ambitious plans that include institutional development, elimination of corruption, energy production, reforming all sectors of the government, with a focus on health, education, local government, and law and order. A number of reforms were introduced in Police, Education, Health, Local Government, and Civil Work departments.

During his tenure as chief minister, Khattak remained committed to establishing good governance in the province through the promotion of transparency, accountability, devolution of power, improving service delivery, entrenching rule of law, empowering citizens with a special focus on women empowerment, and strengthening of institutions.

On 12 July 2023, his membership with the PTI was terminated due to his lack of response to a show-cause notice, which was issued because of allegations that he was inciting other members to leave the party.

=== Formation of the PTI-P ===
On 17 July 2023, Khattak announced his own breakaway party called the PTI-P at a gathering with other senior politicians. Mahmood Khan, another former chief minister of the province, sat alongside Khattak at the time of the announcement. According to a handout issued at this gathering, Khattak would be the chief of the PTIP while more than 57 former members of the Provincial Assembly of Khyber Pakhtunkhwa had joined. The handout further explained that the cause of the new party's formation was difference and conflict with the PTI over the 9 May protests. After his party's defeat in the 2024 Pakistani general election, Khattak left the chairmanship of the party and took a break from politics.

== Chief minister of Khyber Pakhtunkhwa ==
On 13 May 2013, Chairman PTI Imran Khan nominated Pervez Khattak as the chief minister of Khyber Pakhtunkhwa, the top post in the province where PTI, as of 25 July 2018, had 94 out of 145 seats. In 2013, Khattak was elected CM with 4 votes, more than his nearest rival from JUI-F, Maulana Lutfur Rehman, who secured 3 votes.

Khattak led a coalition government with PTI as the leading party, which Jamaat-e-Islami and Awami Jamhuri Ittehad Pakistan were also a part of.

His accomplishments include:

- Implementation of the "Right to Information" bill in KPK
- Energy generation
- De-politicization of police
- Online Crime's First Information Report (FIR) system
- People empowerment & developments
- Mobile courts
- Rehabilitation of drug addicts and IDPs
- Law enforcement capability enhancements
- Upgradation of Khyber Pakhtunkhwa electricity distribution system
- Working on whistleblower law to be implemented in KPK

=== Relations with the federal government ===
Straight away after assuming office Khattak declared that he would pursue a non-confrontational approach with then Federal Government which was controlled by Nawaz Sharif. He hoped this détente would create a more stable environment for the KPK government to produce results. However, confrontation became inevitable with conflict over the direction of the Taliban situation. By October 2013, the provincial government became more independent and assertive from the federal government, threatening to close U.S. supply lines.

=== Security and terrorism policy ===
Khattak favored peace talks with the Taliban. These failed terminally and the policy had to be abandoned. An extremely large number of terrorist attacks happened during his tenure happened culminating in the Army Public School massacre happening when he was Chief Minister. During his tenure an anti-terrorism force was set up. Khattak's government combated drug smugglers leading to the arrests of many in raids.

=== Judiciary ===
Khattak supported the judiciary of his province. The mobile court is used to dispense justice and mediate disputes.

=== Electricity policy ===
In 2012, Khattak introduced a 10-year hydro electric plan which was implemented across the province. He approved energy conservation plans. He also campaigned to prevent electricity theft in the province of KPK.

Khattak's government announced that they would build 350 mini-micro hydel power projects for the small villages. Later, seeing the success of the project, they increased this to 1000 mini-micro hydel projects. The electricity price was less than PKR 2–5 per unit (US$0.02–0.05/kWh).

=== Healthcare ===
The Khattak administration instituted an anti-polio campaign, and introduced drives to increase breast cancer awareness.

The Khattak-led KP government of ANP also launched in 2012 the first-of-its-kind public sector facility in the country, a social health insurance programme for the underprivileged of the province. Through these insurance cards, the disadvantaged will be able to receive medical assistance at both private and public hospitals across the province at no cost.

=== Security policy ===
During his reign, Khattak took a hardline against drone strikes, viewing them as extending extremism, and threatened to block NATO supply lines if drone strikes continued and if the federal government refused to prevent them. Following a drone strike on 2 November 2013, a day before peace talks were due to start with the Taliban, Khattak affirmed that he would use his power to push for the blocking of NATO supply lines.

== See also ==
- Chief ministership of Pervez Khattak

== Notes ==
Political offices
Preceded by Tariq Pervez Khan (Caretaker)	Chief Minister of Khyber Pakhtunkhwa; 2013 –2018	Succeeded by Dost Muhammad Khan (caretaker)
