= Afridi Redshirt Rebellion, Indian North West Frontier 1930–1931 =

Military campaign

The Afridi Redshirt Rebellion was a military campaign conducted by British Indian Army against Afridi tribesmen Ajab Khan Afridi in the North West Frontier region of the Indian Empire, now in Pakistan in 1930–1931.

The Afridi are a Karlani Pashtun tribe who inhabit the border area of Pakistan, notably in the Spin Ghar mountain range to the west of Peshawar and the Maidan Valley in Tirah.

The Afridis often clashed with the British Indian Army during British Raj's expansion towards the Afghan border, notably during the Anglo-Afghan Wars.

In the summer of 1930 a rebellion by dissident Afridi tribesmen, known as Ajab Khan Afridi Redshirts, broke out. As this threatened the security of Peshawar, two Brigade Groups were sent to occupy the Khajuri Plain, west of Peshawar and south of the Khyber Pass. Their role was to open up the area by constructing roads and strong points. This would help prevent any future tribal infiltration towards Peshawar as well as being a punitive measure, since the Afridis had been accustomed to pasture their flocks on this low ground during the winter months.

On 17 October 1930 the British-led force crossed into the Tirah Valley at Bara, six miles from Peshawar, and advanced a further seven miles to Miri Khel. Here a fortified camp was constructed from which operations against the Afridis were conducted.

On 16 January 1931, the force was withdrawn, having accomplished its objective.

British Army that took part in the campaign received the India General Service Medal (1909) with the clasp North West Frontier 1930-31.

Under Mohammad Nadir Shah, Anglo-Afghan ties were strengthened; Nadir supported for British sovereignty over Pashtuns east of the Durand line and strayed neutral when Britain repressed the Afridi Redshirt rebellion. This pro-British stance drew strong opposition from Amanullah loyalists.
