= Afridi (disambiguation) =

The Afridis are a Pashtun tribe.

Afridi may also refer to:

- Afridi (surname)
- Afridi (Carthage), an ancient people of north Africa
- HMS Afridi, two ships of the Royal Navy
