= 2025 Tirah Valley shooting =

Deadly shooting against protestors in Tirah Valley, Pakistan

- Part of Insurgency in Khyber Pakhtunkhwa
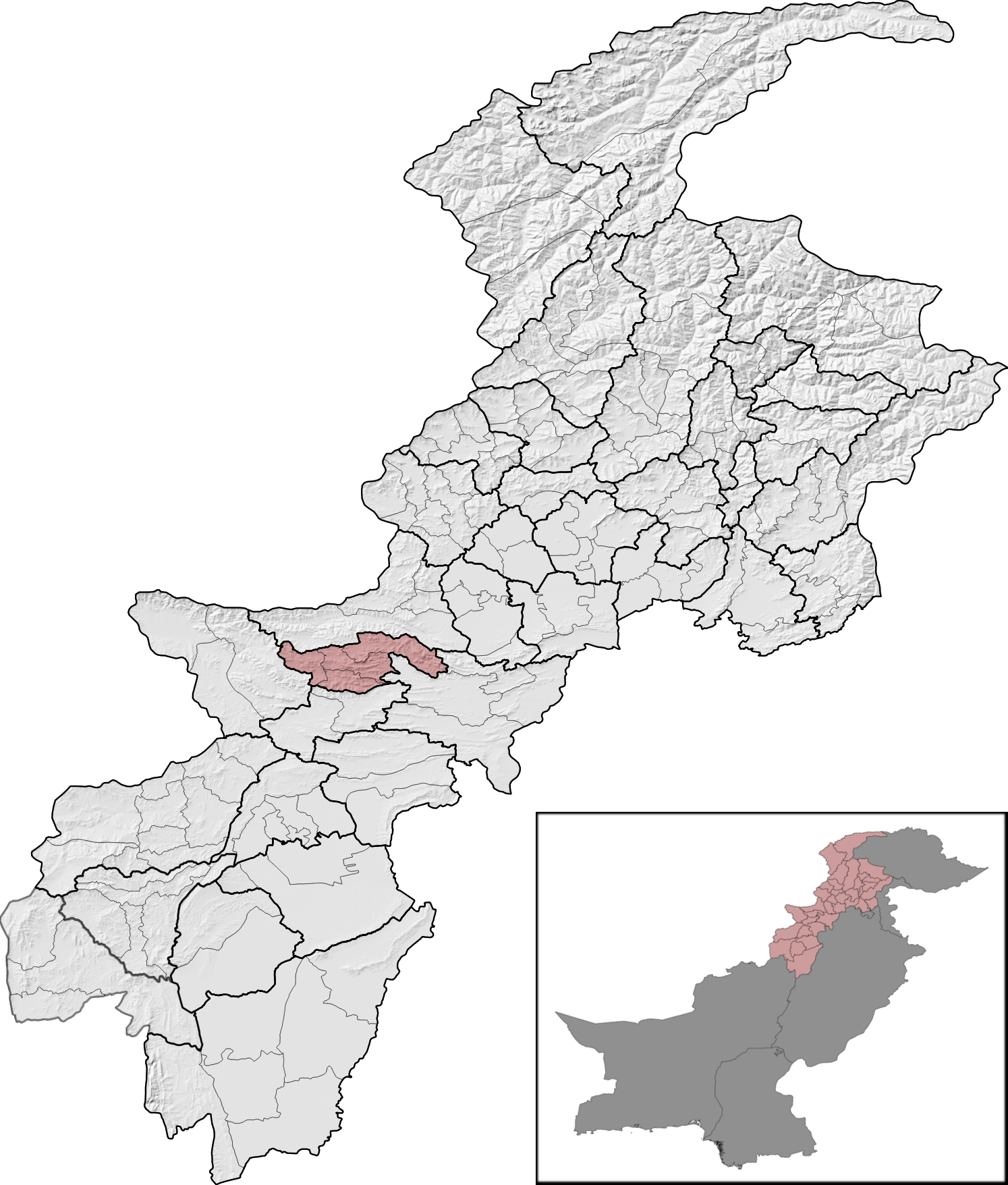
- Date: 27–28 July 2025; Early morning
- Location: Bagh‑Maidan, Tirah, Khyber Pakhtunkhwa, Pakistan

Casualties
- Deaths: 5–6
- Injuries: 17 (1 critical)

The 2025 Tirah Valley firing protesters in Bagh Maidan, Tirah, Pakistan were fired upon on 27–28 July 2025 by unknown assailants, resulting in several deaths and injuries. The shooting occurred outside the Frontier Corps brigade headquarters, where protesters were demonstrating over the reported death of a young girl killed by stray mortar fire. Between five and seven protesters were killed, and at least seventeen others were injured.

== Background ==
The Tirah Valley, located adjacent to Afghanistan, has been a site of persistent insecurity due to the presence of armed groups, including Tehreek-i-Taliban Pakistan (TTP) and Lashkar-e-Islam. Counter-insurgency operations in the region have been ongoing, with an operation in August 2024 resulting in the deaths of twenty-five militants and four soldiers.

Growing civilian anger over collateral damage from military operations preceded the incident. In November 2024, the death of two schoolboys in a mortar shelling incident prompted a peace rally of approximately ten thousand people in Bara town. On 6 July 2025, a grand jirga of Afridi elders issued demands for an end to both militant violence and indiscriminate shelling by security forces.

== Incident ==
On 27 July 2025, hundreds of local residents marched to the Frontier Corps camp at Bagh-Maidan Markaz early on a Sunday morning. They carried the body of a 10-tear-old girl who was reportedly killed by stray ordnance the previous day in the Darbar locality of Peer Mela in Zakhakhel. After officials declined to meet with them, according to local sources and eye-witnesses, situation had turned violent when the angry mob, comprising mostly young men who had ignored calls by local elders to remain calm, set fire to a dispensary near the headquarters. The protesters also had set fire to an excavator near the camp's gate and attempted to force it open. Some of the protesters were also seen throwing stones at the Frontier Corps Brigade Headquarters, while trying to forcibly open the main gate. According to eyewitnesses and tribal elders, the protesters were unarmed.

When the shooting occurred, three people died on the spot while the rest of the casualties occurred on the way to local hospitals. Government officials said that "Kharijites" (TTP militants) opened fire on the protesters.

Initial reports placed the number of casualties at 5 dead, while later accounts recorded 6 fatalities and 17 injuries.

== Aftermath ==
=== Evacuation of victims ===
Victims of the shooting were initially transported to the Frontier Corps Hospital in Shah Kas Jamrud and during the journey 2 had died on the way. Out of the remaining 17 injured victims, 7 were later shifted to the Dogra hospital in Bara and six to the Hayatabad Medical Complex in Peshawar.

=== Meeting with tribal elders at brigade headquarters ===
A delegation of tribal elders from Tirah later held a series of meetings with security officials at FC Brigade Headquarters. Security officials said that the local sector commander of the Frontier Corps in Tirah met with local elders and he had assured them of his complete support in meeting their demands. As per the demand of the elders, security forces announced financial compensation for the families of the deceased and the injured. Security forces had agreed to PKR 1.5 million compensation to the families of each deceased and PKR 200,000 assistance to each injured.

=== Jigra called by provincial government ===
The KPK government had called a jirga (an assembly of tribal leaders) comprising tribal elders and public representatives in order to address their issues. The provincial government of Khyber Pakhtunkhwa announced a compensation package of PKR 10 million for the family of each deceased individual and PKR 2.5 million for each injured person.

=== End of protests ===
Subsequently after the intervention by Tirah's elders, the protesters dispersed. After a partial agreement on the demands, the protest ended and the situation started to return to normal.

== Reactions ==
Initially, there wasn't any official statement from the local government or the paramilitary forces about the mortar strike, or the shooting in Tirah.

=== Government ===
In the following days, Prime Minister Shehbaz Sharif expressed grief over the shooting and ordered a judicial inquiry into the incident and directed authorities to provide medical assistance to the wounded. He also ordered authorities to provide immediate medical assistance to the injured.

Officials also expressed their sympathies with the relatives of those who had lost their lives during the shooting.

=== Protests in response to the shooting ===
National Assembly member Iqbal Afridi and Provisional Assembly member Abdul Ghani, along with their supporters, held a protest at Bab-e-Khyber in Jamrud against shooting. They demanded an independent and transparent investigation and inquiry into the incident as well as adequate compensation for the victims. The lawmakers opposed the ongoing military operation in the Tirah valley and demanded that peace should brought through, without having the locals be displaced.

== See also ==
- September 2025 Tirah airstrike
- Operation Sarbakaf
- Operation Azm-e-Istehkam
- Insurgency in Khyber Pakhtunkhwa
