= Mir Dast Afridi =

Soldier of the First World War

Mir Dast VC, IOM, OBI
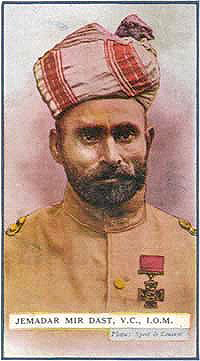
- Dast depicted on a Gallaher's cigarette card (c. 1915–1919)
- Born: 3 December 1874; Tirah, British India (present day Khyber Pakhtunkhwa, Pakistan)
- Died: 19 January 1945 (aged 70); Tehsil, Peshawar, British India
- Burial place: Warsak Road Cemetery, Shagi Hindkyan, Khyber Pakhtunkhwa, Pakistan
- Relatives: Mir Mast Afridi (brother)
- Military career
- Branch: British Indian Army
- Service years: 1894–1917
- Rank: Subedar
- Units: 55th Coke's Rifles (Frontier Force)
- Conflicts: North-West Frontier; First World War
- Awards: Victoria Cross; Indian Order of Merit, 2nd Class; Order of British India, 2nd Class; Cross of St. George, 3rd Class (Russia)

Mir Dast, VC, IOM, OBI (3 December 1874 – 19 January 1945), also known as Mir Dost and Mir Dast Afridi, was a British Indian soldier and a recipient of the Victoria Cross, the highest award for gallantry in the face of the enemy that can be awarded to British and Commonwealth forces, for his actions during the First World War. Mir Dast returned to British India as a handicapped and injured soldier and received a hero's welcome.

== Early life ==
Mir Dast (some sources spell his name as Mir Dost) was a Pashtun from the Afridi tribe and was born on 3 December 1874 to a Muslim family in the Maidan valley, Tirah, British India, in what is now Pakistan. Mir Dast enlisted in the British Indian Army in December 1894. He served in the North-West Frontier and Waziristan prior to the First World War, and for the Mohmand Expedition he received the Indian Order of Merit, 3rd Class on 26 June 1908. He was promoted to the rank of jemadar (warrant officer) in March 1909.

His younger brother was Mir Mast Afridi who was promoted to a jemadar rank before the outbreak of the First World War while he was in service with the 58th Vaughan's Rifles (Frontier Force) of the British Indian Army and would later defect to German lines on 4 March 1915. Mir Mast was reportedly offended by the British being at war with the Muslim Ottoman Empire. It is widely believed that he deserted due to his Islamic beliefs and did not want to fight against the fellow Muslims in the German–Ottoman alliance.

== Victoria Cross award ==
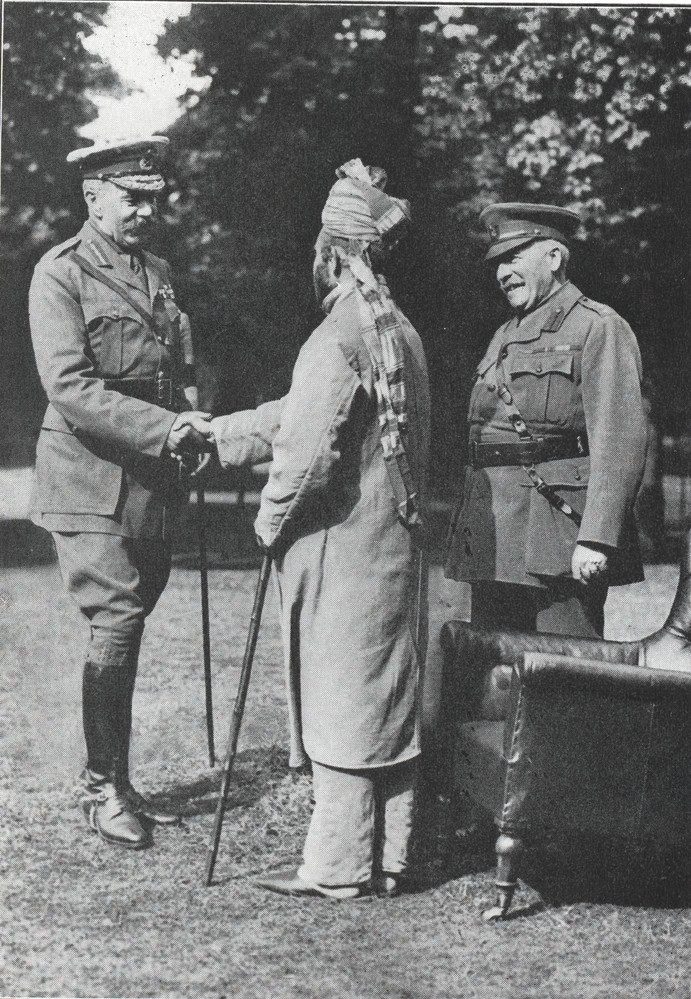
Mir Dast - shown being visited by Lord Kitchener - received his medal from King George V at the Royal Pavilion, Brighton.

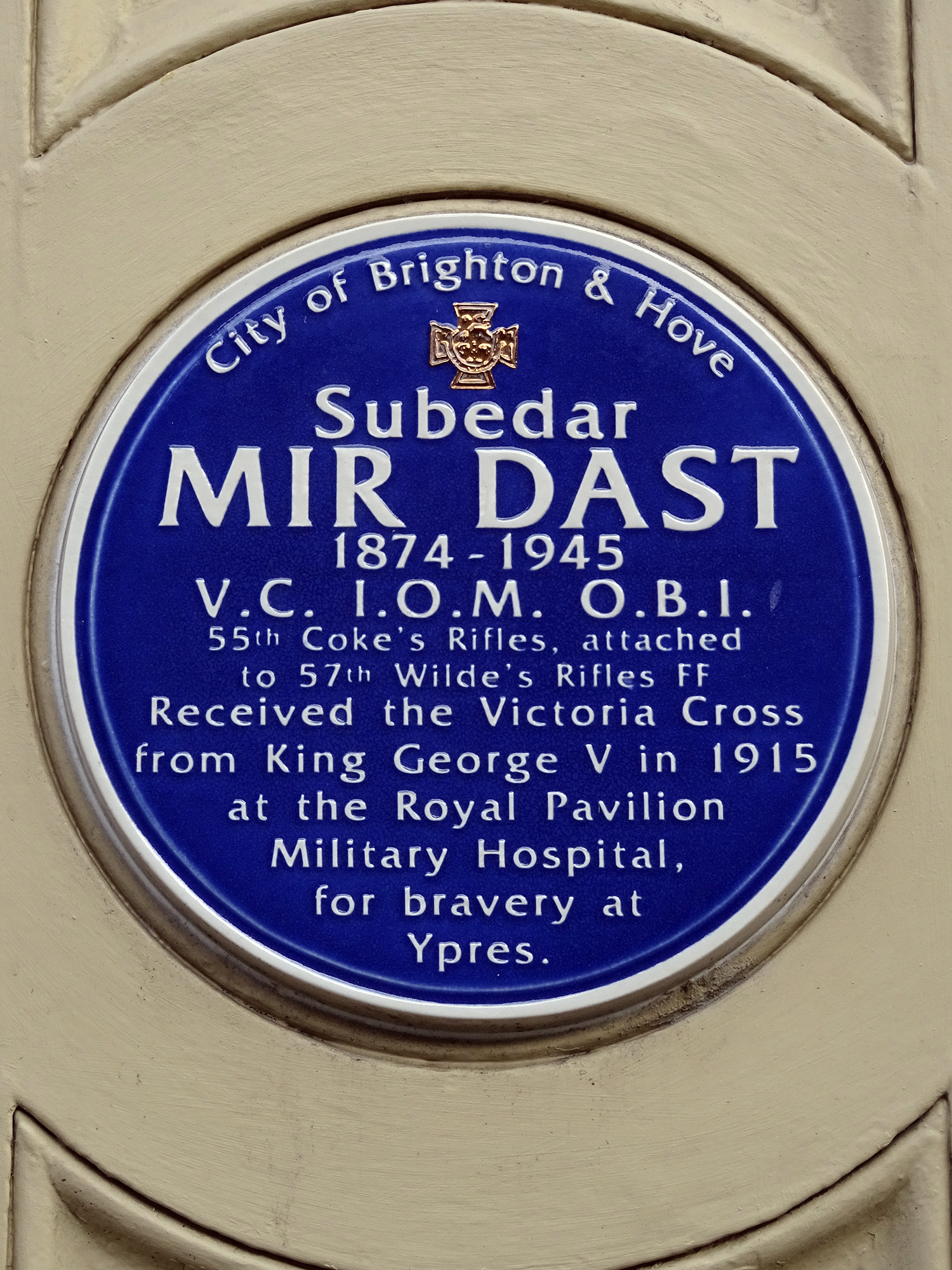
Blue plaque in Brighton, England

During the First World War, Dast was a jemadar (warrant officer) in the 55th Coke's Rifles (Frontier Force), British Indian Army, attached to the 57th Wilde's Rifles (Frontier Force) when he performed the service for which he was awarded the Victoria Cross during the Second Battle of Ypres near the Belgium-France border area.

On 26 April 1915 at Ypres, Belgium, Jemadar Mir Dast led his platoon with great gallantry during a German counter-attack, and afterwards collected various parties of the regiment (when no officers were left) and kept them under his command. He also displayed remarkable courage that day in helping to carry eight British and Indian Officers into safety, while exposed to very heavy fire and chlorine gas attacks which left Dast wounded and in severe pain.

The citation read:

"For most conspicuous bravery and great ability at Ypres on 26th April, 1915, when he led his platoon with great gallantry during the attack, and afterwards collected various parties of the regiment (when no British Officers were left) and kept them under his command until the retirement was ordered. Jemadar Mir Dast, subsequently on this day, displayed remarkable courage in helping to carry eight British and Indian Officers into safety whilst exposed to very heavy fire".

Dast was subsequently sent for treatment in the Royal Pavilion, Brighton, where he received his medal from King George V who pinned it on his chest himself on 25 August 1915. His was the fourth Victoria Cross awarded to an Indian since Indians had become eligible for the award in 1912.

=== Other awards ===
- Before this on 26 June 1908, he was awarded the Indian Order of Merit, (3rd Class).
- Cross of St. George, (3rd Class) (Russia) on 25 August 1915.

== Later life and legacy ==
Dast retired from active service in 1917 with the rank of subedar. He died on 19 January 1945 at Shagi Hindkyan Village, Tehsil, Peshawar, and was buried at Warsak Road Cemetery, Shagi Hindkyan (now in Khyber Pakhtunkhwa, Pakistan).

A monument stands at the Memorial Gates at Hyde Park Corner in London to commemorate the Victoria Cross awards of Indian heritage, including Mir Dast's award.

A blue plaque was erected in May 2016 in honour of Mir Dast next to the Indian Gate at Royal Pavilion Gardens in Brighton, England.
