= Malik Mehr un Nisa Afridi =

Pakistani lawyer and politician

MNA Malik Mehrun Nisa Afridi
- مالك مَہرُالنساءاپريدي

Member of the National Assembly of Pakistan
- In office 25 March 2008 – 25 March 2013
- President: Asif Ali Zardari
- Prime Minister: Yousaf Raza Gillani, Raja Pervaiz Ashraf
- Constituency: Reserved Seat for Women

Member of the National Assembly of Pakistan
- In office 2 December 1988 – 6 August 1990
- President: Ghulam Ishaq Khan
- Prime Minister: Benazir Bhutto
- Constituency: Reserved Seat for Women

Member of the Central Executive Committee of the Pakistan Peoples Party
- In office 2001–2008

President of the Women Wing KPK
- In office 16 May 1985 – 2 February 2010

Personal details
- Born: 7 April 1943 Peshawar, Khyber Pakhtunkhwa, Pakistan
- Died: 4 March 2013 (aged 70)
- Party: Pakistan Peoples Party
- Spouse: Umar Nasir
- Children: 1
- Parent: Malik Abdul Malik Afridi
- Education: University of Peshawar
- Occupation: Lawyer, politician

Malik Mehrun Nisa Afridi (Urdu: ملک مہرالنساءآفریدی; Pashto: مالك مَہرُالنساءاپريدي; 7 April 1943 – 4 March 2013) was a Pakistani lawyer and politician. She was twice member of the Lower house of Parliament. She was elected on Reserved Seats for Women in the 8th National Assembly from 1988 to 1990 and again in the 13th National Assembly from 2008 to 2013. She joined Pakistan Peoples Party on April 24, 1968, as a Student Leader and stayed loyal to her party until her death on 4 March 2013. She was a successful Lawyer well respected by her peers. She was a member of the Central Executive Committee of the Pakistan Peoples Party.

== Early life ==
Malik Merhrun Nisa Afridi was born in the city of Peshawar in the North-West Frontier Province of British Indian Empire now Khyber-Pakhtunkhwa, Pakistan to Mr. & Mrs. Malik Abdul Malik Afridi. She belonged to the Malikdín Khel clan of the Afridi Tribe. Her father died when she was nine years old. Her mother was a school teacher and later Principle of GHSS Begum Shahabuddin school.

She was member of the Pakistan Girl Guides Association and attended various camps in West Pakistan and East Pakistan (Now Bangladesh). During the Indo-Pakistani War of 1965 she was a volunteer and was deputed at Lady Reading Hospital Peshawar to aid the wounded of air raids by India.

She was inspired from her mother and maternal step uncle to join politics. Her mother was active in the Pakistan Movement and was the member of All-India Muslim League. Her mother was at numerous historical protests held in Peshawar against British Rule.

Her maternal step uncle, Malik Waris Khan Afridi, was a member of Indian National Congress. He was imprisoned numerous times for his opposition to British Rule in India.

Drawing inspiration from her mother and uncle she joined politics at an early age first as a student leader and then as the president of Gunj Ward.

== Education ==
She received her primary and secondary education at GHSS Begum Shahabuddin School. She completed her matriculation in 1960. Then she went to Government Frontier College for Higher Secondary Education and completed her Faculty of Arts (F.A) in 1963. She completed her Bachelor of Arts (B.A) degree in 1965 and Bachelor of Education (B.ed) in 1974 from College of Education University of Peshawar. She earned a Masters of Arts Degree (M.A) Pashto held in 1970 and Master of Arts (M.A) Psychology from University of Peshawar. She went to Law College Peshawar and earned a degree in Bachelor of Laws (LL.B) in 1978.

She was the editor of the Pashto portion of her college magazine Taleem. She was also editor of the College of Education and Law College magazines. She wrote Pashto poetry and Pashto dramas which were broadcast by Radio Pakistan.

== Career ==
She was a lecturer in Pashto selected by Public Service Commission. She taught in well known college of Peshawar named "Frontier College for Women Peshawar" and "Women Degree College Nowshera".

She started her career as a lawyer from 1979 and continued till 2006. She had the license to practice law at the Supreme Court of Pakistan and High Court of Pakistan. During the martial law of Zia Ul Haq she actively defended fellow political workers from persecution.

She represented underprivileged women mostly victims of domestic abuse and fought for justice for them.

She declined to be appointed as a judge in 1996 so that she could pursue her political career as the president of Pakistan People Parties Women Wing (KP).

=== Political career ===
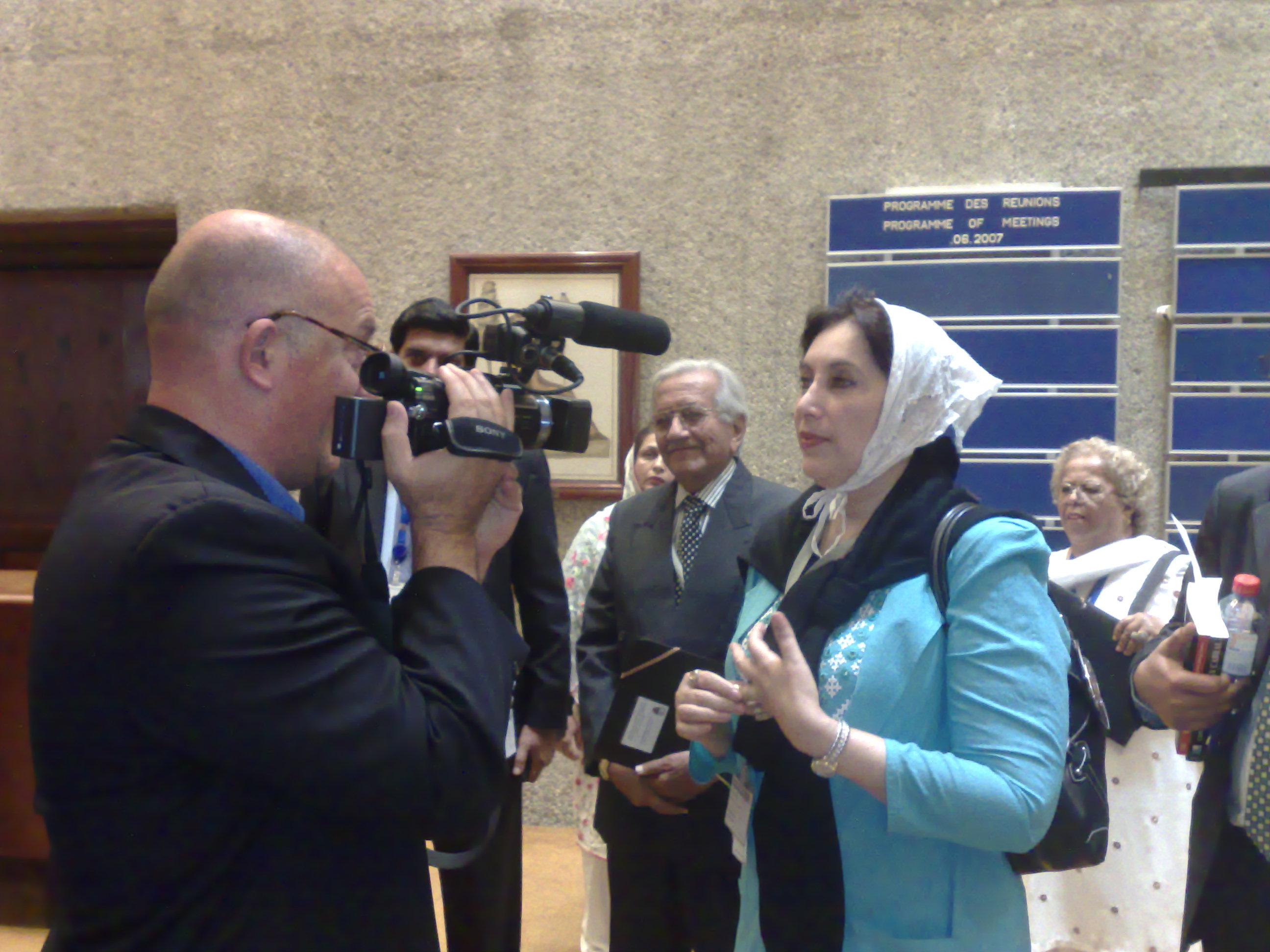
Benazir Bhutto interview during Socialist International meeting in 2007. Mehrun Nisa Afridi in background

She joined PPP on 24 April 1968, soon after the party was founded by Shaheed Zulfiqar Ali Bhutto. In 1970 when Hayat Sherpao started PPP Women Wing she was appointed president of Gunj Ward. She organized Gunj Ward by going door to door which was very difficult at that time in conservative Pushtun society.

She was appointed by Shaheed Zulfiqar Ali Bhutto as a member of the board of Directors in Pashto Academy. As member she checked all the Pusho courses which was thought in Matric, F.A, B.A and M.A. She sent all the anti Pakistan and Anti Quid-e-Azam material to Shaheed Zulfiqar Ali Bhutto through Dr. Mahboob-ur-Rehman (Who was O.S.D for N.W.F.P). Her efforts were appreciated.

She was appointed chief organizer of the Peoples Student Federation (Women Wing) in 1973 the notification to this effect was issued by Shaheed Zulfiqar Ali Bhutto. Due to her team's hard work, the Peoples Student Federation won the first University Union Election and Mr. Amir Muhammad Khan Apalo was elected the first Peshawar university president. She organized PSF in all departments of University of Peshawar, Gomal University and many other girls degree colleges and high schools in Khyber Pakhtunkhwa and FATA.

She was elected Provincial General Secretary of PPP Women Wing by a two-thirds majority in the inter-party election held on August 16, 1976, which were supervised by Begum Nusrat Bhutto.

She was sent to a Regional Cooperation for Development (RCD) summit now called Economic Cooperation Organization (ECO) in which she traveled to Turkey on 20 April 1977, from there to Iran on 22 April 1977, and finally to USSR on 27 April 1977.

In 1977 martial law was imposed by General Zia ul Haq. She was appointed President of Bhutto Release Committee N.W.F.P formed by Begum Nusrat Bhutto. She organized and led many protests to release Shaheed Zulfiqar Ali Bhutto.

She was arrested in 1978 by the military regime of Zia-ul-Haq and spent two years and nine months in prison given "C" Class where she was mentally tortured. She was kept in a cell with a mad woman who used to deprive her of sleep by making loud noise. She was asked by the martial law authorities to remove the PPP flags from her car and residence. She did not obey the orders of a dictator. She suffered a heart attack in prison. She was later kept in house arrest and her house was declared a sub-jail.

... In Khyber I told the people that being a tribal I went to jail and used bricks as my pillow and ugly old blanket for sleeping but I never compromised on my principles and sacrificed everything for the sake of my country and democracy.

After release she spent most of the time fighting cases of other political victims who were jailed. In defiance of the military regime she painted her vehicle in the three colors of Pakistan People's Party. She refused to bow before a dictator and beg for mercy while other prominent party members had done so for the sake of their freedom.

She was elected the President of Women's Wing (Khyber Pakhtunkhwa) in 1985 and remained till 2 February 2010, when she was too ill to carry on with her duties.

She became a member of Pakistan's Lower House of Parliament in 1988. She served the nation till the Parliament was dissolved by President Ghulam Ishaq Khan.

She was appointed member of five Standing Committee in different Ministries.

As MNA she went on an official visit to Hungary on 22 October 1989.

As MNA she went on an official visit to Geneva, Switzerland, on 14 November 1989.

As MNA she went on an official visit to the United States on 24 November 1989.

In 1996 when People's Party again came to power she was an adviser and a confidant of Prime Minister Benazir Bhutto.

Martial law was imposed once again in 1999 by General Musharraf. She was once again struggling for her party by organizing protests. She worked very hard to organize the party in those turbulent times.

She became the member of the Central Executive Committee of the Pakistan Peoples Party from October 2001 to 2008.

Benazir Bibi conveyed her wish, to Mehrun Nisa Afridi to associate herself with National Democratic Institute (NDI) for the promotion of ladies in politics. She contacted NDI and they offered her to become a Master Trainer N.W.F.P. Which she accepted. Consequently, a three-day workshop was held in Islamabad to this effect which she attended. After coming back to Peshawar she organized three workshop's for ladies, one each at Dera Ismail Khan, Lukky Marwat and Haripur. The turnout of the ladies from different political parties was most encouraging. The ratio of lady trainees from Pakistan Peoples Party was the highest in these workshops. The team of NDI appreciated her work.

On 25 January 2004, she arranged PPP Ladies Convention N.W.F.P at Nishter Hall Peshawar under the President-ship of Mr Jehangir Bader. The other Honorable Guest were Central Members of the party Mr Raja Pervaiz Ashraf, Begum Ruqqia Khanum Soomro, Miss Fozia Habib, Begum Samina Razaq, Miss Nargis Faiz Malik, Khwaja Muhammad Khan Hoti, Mr Mirza Khan other Male & Female Provencial office bearers.

She attended Social International's 50th Anniversary held at Lisbon, Portugal, 29–30 June 2001 with Benazir Bibi.

She attended Social International's Casablanca Council – Peace, Security, Development held at Casablanca, Morocco, 31 May to 1 June 2002 with Benazir Bibi.

She attended Socialist International Women held at Athens, Greece, 27–28 January 2006.

She attended a meeting of the Council of the Socialist International held at Geneva, Switzerland, 29–30 June 2007 with Benazir Bibi.

She became a member of the National Assembly again in 2008.

She was a member of the National Assembly Standing Committee on Women's Development and Standing Committee on Ministry of States and Frontier Regions (SAFRON).

She requested party ticket to contest in the 2013 General Election from NA-18. However she was hospitalized and died.

== Illness and death ==
Mehrun Nisa Afridi suffered from Parkinson's disease since 2006 her health deteriorated slowly as the disease progressed. She was hospitalized on 26 February 2013, and was diagnosed with meningitis which resulted in renal failure and finally she died from cardiac arrest on 4 March 2013, at around 1:20 am.

The funeral prayers of Mehrun Nisa Afridi were offered at a ground near Masjid-e-Saddiq near her residence. Khyber Pakhtunkhwa Assembly Speaker Karamatullah Khan Chagharmati, Provincial Health Minister Zahir Ali Shah, Provincial Information Secretary of Pakistan People Party Ayub Shah, Zulfiqar Afghani and Thousands of people attended the funeral prayers including other notable people.

Dr. Azra Fazal Pechuho, Naheed Khan, Khwaja Muhammad Khan Hoti visited the house of Mehr un Nisa Afridi and paid their condolences to the bereaved family.

The lower house of Parliament held collective prayers for Mehrunisa Afridi and victims of the Abbas Town attack. Following its tradition of suspending all legislative business on the occasion of a sitting member's death, the National Assembly's Monday session was adjourned after offering prayers for PPP's Mehrunnisa Afridi who had died in Peshawar on Sunday night after a brief illness.

Khyber Pakhtunkhwa Governor Engineer Shaukatullah expressed his heartfelt condolence, paying tributes to her social, human rights and political services for the country and termed her a seasoned politician with numerous qualities of head and hearts. He said the service rendered by Mehrunisa Afridi for the country and KP would be "remembered for long".

Prime Minister Raja Pervez Ashraf expressed sorrow over the death of Mehrunnisa Afridi. In a condolence message, he paid tributes to her contribution to democracy. He prayed for eternal peace for her soul.

President Asif Ali Zardari described her as "an advocate defending human rights in her capacity as former president of the women's wing of the PPP Khyber-Pakhtunkhwa and as a parliamentarian. The President also prayed for eternal rest to the soul of Ms. Mehrunnisa Afridi and patience to the members of bereaved family to bear the loss with fortitude.

== Legacy ==
She was a role model for young women in a very conservative society especially at a time when women were confined to their houses. She stood up against the brutal regime of Zia-ul-Haq and defied the full might of the oppressive regime.

Her struggle for democracy and her sacrifices during the period of martial law of Zia-ul-Haq set her apart from many women politicians.

== Authored books ==
- Gulabona (2015)

== See also ==
- Politics of Pakistan
- Pakistan Peoples Party
- National Assembly of Pakistan
- Central Executive Committee of the Pakistan Peoples Party
- Khyber Pakhtunkhwa
- Pakistan Movement
- British Indian Empire
- Pakistan Movement
- All-India Muslim League
- Indian National Congress
