= Mir Mast Afridi =

Pashtun defector to the Ottoman cause

Iron Cross Mîr Māst Mujahid-i-Millat Warrior of the Nation
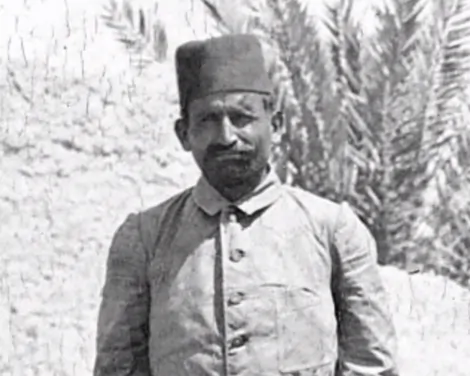
- Mir Mast as a recruit to protect a mission to Kabul to convince Emir Habibullāh to join the Central Powers
- Born: March 1876; Maidan, Tirah Valley, North West Frontier Province
- Died: During WWI or 1919 (aged ~43); Emirate of Afghanistan
- Cause of death: Spanish influenza
- Relatives: Muhammad Amir Khan Afridi (father); Mir Dast Afridi (brother)
- Military career
- Allegiance: British India (AWOL) (German Empire) Second Reich; Ottoman Empire
- Rank: Jemadar (Warrant officer)
- Conflicts: World War I

Mir Mast Khan Afridi (Pashto: میر مست اپريدي) was a Pashtun revolutionary soldier of the British Indian Army who defected to the Central Powers to support the Ottoman cause from Afghanistan inciting other Pashtun Muslim defections from the Afghan frontier during the First World War.

== Biography ==
Mir Mast hailed from the Qambarkhēl Afridi tribe of Terah from the village of Kharkay. His elder brother was Mir Dast who was a recipient of the Victoria Cross for his gallantry in the Second Battle of Ypres in 1915.

Upon the outbreak of the First World War, over one million Indian soldiers were mobilised to fight the Central Powers in Asia, Africa and Europe. Mir Mast arrived in France in 1914 where his brother Mir Dast was also serving. He was under the 58 Vaughan's Rifles and fought in the Battle of Neuve Chapelle. On a chilly rainy night on the 2nd and 3 March 1915, Mir Mast led either 14 or 22 other Afridi Pashtun soldiers to defect. (Note: Following the desertion, the remaining 120 Pashtun soldiers of the battalion were immediately disarmed.) He then partook in a belligerent engagement with British troops causing savage losses and was said to have been decorated with the Iron Cross on April 24 by the Kaiser himself, Wilhelm II.

He set out on a Jihad against the British Empire travelling via Constantinople to Kabul. He met the chief religious scholar of Turkey who conferred upon him the title of Mujahid-i-Millat (Note: [Islamic] warrior of the nation or faith) and the Islamic flag as an emblem. He supported the Ottoman Caliphate and was determined to raise a force with Turkish and German assistance to resist the British. He was sent to Afghanistan as an envoy to persuade an Afghan entry into the war which was not accomplished. However, in May 1915 Afghan military chief Prince Nasrullah Khan gave an assurance to finance expeditions in the Tirah Valley. Mir Mast also made contact with Haji Sahib of Turangzai who was occupied fighting the British with the Mohmand tribe. Peshawar Commissioner George Roos-Keppel discovered the plot and burned the houses of Mir Mast and his companions in an attempt to corner him.

== Death ==
Mir Mast eventually returned to his homeland but remained just outside of British jurisdiction in the border area of the Emirate of Afghanistan. Mir Mast Khan Afridi died in the Spanish influenza epidemic during the Great War or in 1919.
