= Peshawar Public Library and Archives =

Library in Khyber Pakhtunkhwa, Pakistan

Coordinates: 34.0078°N 71.5592°E

- Location: Peshawar, Khyber Pakhtunkhwa, Pakistan
- Type: Public
- Established: 1946

Collection
- Items collected: Books, magazines, newspapers

The Peshawar Public Library and Archives (Pashto: د پېښور عامه کتابتون او ارشیف) is a public library in Peshawar, Khyber Pakhtunkhwa. It is managed by the Directorate of Archives and Libraries.

== History ==
Peshawar Public Library and Archives was founded in 1946. The building of the library was designed by architect Nayyar Ali Dada.

== Collections ==
Managed by the Directorate of Archives and Libraries, Khyber Pakhtunkhwa, the library holds a substantial collection, dating back to 1849. It includes 140,000 books, 35,000 publications, 45,000 original files, 25,000 magazines, and 600,000 old newspapers.

The archives contain important historical documents and reports, covering events such as the kidnapping of Ellis by Ajab Khan Afridi and the murder of Dr. Khan Sahib. Noteworthy items include the Durand Line documentation, the Pakhtunistan Movement records, letters from Quaid-i-Azam, Tareekh-i-Peshawar by Ram Gopal Das, and various other publications and magazines.
