= Afridi =

Pashtun tribe

افریدی
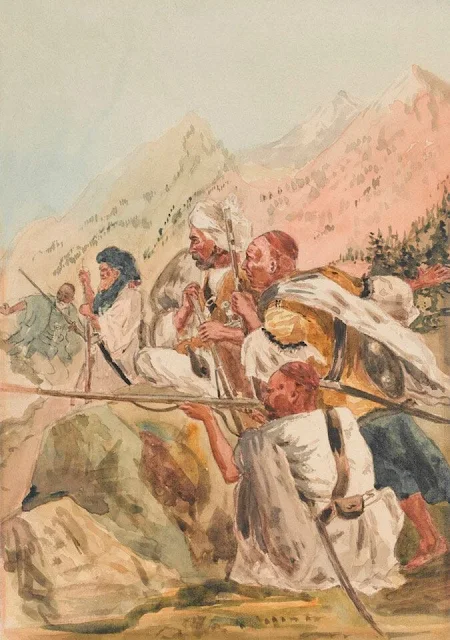
- Afridi tribesmen firing behind a rock, 1880

Languages
- Pashto (Afridi)

Religion
- Islam

Related ethnic groups
- Khattak · Orakzai · Wazir · Banuchi and other Karlani Pashtun tribes

The Afrīdī (Pashto: اپريدی Aprīdai, plur. اپريدي Aprīdī) are a Pashtun tribe present mostly in tribal areas in Khyber Pakhtunkhwa, Pakistan.

The Afridis are most dominant in the Safed Koh range west of Peshawar in tribal areas of modern-day Khyber Pakhtunkhwa, covering most of the Khyber Pass and Maidan in Tirah. They are the closest to Orakzai in their language, culture and geographic areas.

== Etymology ==
Herodotus, in his Histories, mentions an Indian tribe named Aparytai (Ἀπαρύται) inhabiting the Achaemenid satrapy of Arachosia. Thomas Holdich and Olaf Caroe have linked them with the Afridi tribe:

The Sattagydae, Gandarii, Dadicae, and Aparytae (Ἀπαρύται) paid together a hundred and seventy talents; this was the seventh province

— Herodotus, The Histories, Book III, Chapter 91, Section 4

== Origin and clans ==
The origin of the Afridis is uncertain. Among the Afridi six Ḵaybar clans are generally distinguished: the Kūkī Ḵēl, Kambar Ḵēl, Kamar Ḵēl, Malek-dīn Ḵēl, Sepāh, and Zakkā Ḵēl (or Zəḵā Ḵēl), in the Khyber pass region. In addition, there are two "assimilated clans" not recognized by the first six, the Akā Ḵēl, settled south of the Bārā river in contact with the Ōrakzī, and the Ādam Ḵēl, occupying a mountainous region between Peshawar and Kohat. This complex clan structure, perhaps reflects the diversity of the origins of the different ethnic groups forming this great tribe.

== History ==
=== Resistance against the Mughals ===
The Afridis and their allies Khalils were first mentioned in the memoirs of Mughal Emperor Babar as violent tribes in need of subduing. The Afridi tribes controlled the Khyber Pass, which has served as a corridor connecting the Indian subcontinent with Afghanistan and Central Asia. Its strategic value was not lost on the Mughals to whom the Afridis were implacably hostile.

Over the course of Mughal rule, Emperors Akbar and Jahangir both dispatched punitive expeditions to suppress the Afridis, with little success.

Under the leadership of Darya Khan Afridi, they engaged in protracted warfare against the Mughal army in the 1670s. The Afridis once destroyed two large Mughal armies of Emperor Aurangzeb: in 1672, in a surprise attack between Peshawar and Kabul, and in the winter of 1673, in an ambush in the mountain passes. The emperor sent his Rajput general Rai Tulsidas with reinforcements into the mountains to suffocate the revolt and liberate the mountain. Allegedly, only five Mughal soldiers made it out of the battle alive and the rest of the Mughals were brutally slaughtered.

=== British Raj ===
During the First, Second, and Third Anglo-Afghan Wars, Afridis fought against the British; these skirmishes comprised some of the fiercest fighting of the Anglo-Afghan Wars. Ajab Khan Afridi was a well-known independence activist against the British Raj.

The British colonial administration regarded the Pashtun Afridi tribesmen as "martial tribe" under the martial races theory. Different Afridi clans also cooperated with the British in exchange for subsidies, and some even served with the Khyber Rifles, an auxiliary force of the British Indian Army.

=== First Kashmir War ===
Shortly after the Partition of India and the creation of Pakistan, Afridi tribesmen were among the ranks of the Pashtun militias that invaded the princely state of Jammu and Kashmir in October 1947, sparking the Indo-Pakistani War of 1947–1948 and the ongoing Kashmir conflict.

=== Current times ===
Today, Afridis make use of their dominant positions along the Durand Line in areas of Pakistan's Khyber Pakhtunkhwa province by controlling transport and various businesses, including trade in armaments, munitions and goods. Beside commercial activities, the Afridis also occupy substantial representation among Pakistan Armed Forces and paramilitary forces such as Khyber Rifles.

In India, the Afridis of Farrukhabad and Malihabad (in the Lucknow district of Uttar Pradesh) are descendants of the Ali Khel branch. They played significant military, political, and literary roles during the 18th and 19th centuries in the region.

The first known ancestor to settle in India was Jahan Khan Afridi, who migrated from Khyber along with his tribe and settled in Farrukhabad. He served as commander-in-chief under Muhammad Khan Bangash, the nawab of Farrukhabad. Jahan Khan Afridi had eight sons, whose descendants remain in Farrukhabad. One of them, Muhammad Khan Afridi, became the deputy and prime minister of the Farrukhabad. The ruler Qaim Khan later entrusted the administration of the state to him and retired from governance to focus on religious devotion.

Jahan Khan's cousin, Yar Beg Khan Afridi, was invited to India along with his five brothers. Initially, they settled in Farrukhabad, but due to political disputes, they later joined Safdar Jang of Awadh. These brothers became known across North India as the "Paanch Bhaiye" (Five Brothers), each commanding his own military regiment (risala). Eventually, the family settled in Qawalhar, a locality of Malihabad, which was inhabited by the Amanzai Pashtuns. Some members later returned to Farrukhabad and the Khyber region, while others remained in Malihabad, where their descendants became prominent figures in culture, administration, and literature. Zakir Husain (1897–1969), the third president of India, was a descendant of the Afridi family of Farrukhabad. He was an eminent educationist, co-founder of Jamia Millia Islamia, and the first Muslim to hold the office of president.

== Religion ==
Afridis follow the Sunni sect of Islam. Their conversion to Islam is attributed to Sultan (Emperor) Mahmud of Ghazni by Denzil Ibbetson and Haroon Rashid.

== Notable Afridis ==
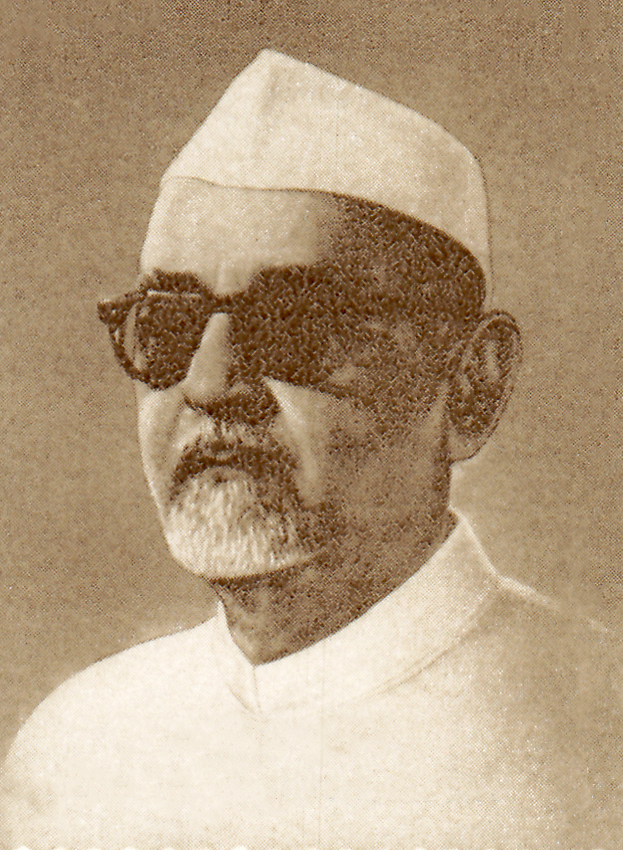
Zakir Husain, first Muslim president of India

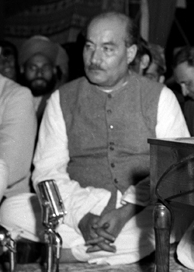
Josh Malihabadi, Urdu poet

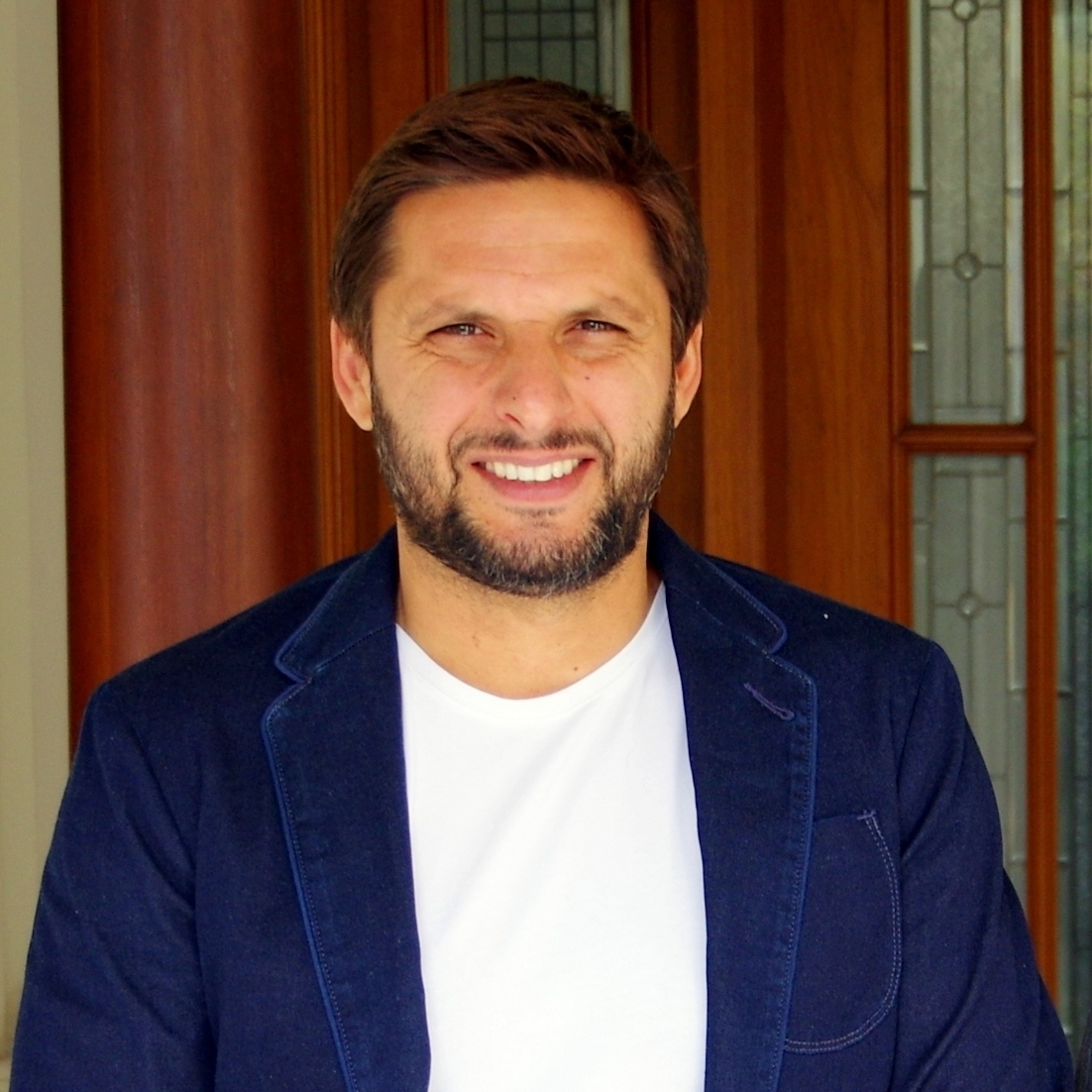
Shahid Afridi, cricketer

=== Activists ===
- Fareeda Kokikhel Afridi, women's rights activist who founded the Society for Appraisal and Women Empowerment in Rural Areas and assassinated by religious extremists.

=== Businessman ===
- Javed Afridi, owner of PSL team Peshawar Zalmi and owner of Haier Pakistan.

=== Combatants ===
- Ajab Khan Afridi, a rebel fighter during the British Raj who carried out an attack on British forces, sparking the Afridi Redshirts Rebellion.
- Darya Khan Afridi, famed warrior of the Mughal–Afghan Wars, a national hero of Afghanistan. He closed the gates of Khyber and ambushed the Mughal forces of Aurangzeb raining down their firepower onto the confused mass, reconquering the lands of the Khyber Pass.
- Nawab Faqir Muhammad khan Goya, Indian warrior and poet who served as commander-in-chief of the Oudh State, Indore State, and the pindari forces.
- Khushdil Khan Afridi, military general in the Pakistan Army.
- Mangal Bagh, also known as Mangal Bagh Afridi, was the leader of Lashkar-e-Islam, a militant group operating in Pakistan and Afghanistan.
- Mir Dast Afridi, a British Indian soldier and a recipient of the Victoria Cross.
- Mir Mast Khan Afridi, defected from the British Army during the First World War and recruited fellow ethnic Pashtun soldiers of the Tribal Belt for the Ottoman cause operating from Afghanistan.
- Monawar Khan Afridi, a brigadier in the British Indian Army, notably a doctor during the Burma Campaign working against malaria and later served as the third Vice-Chancellor for the University of Peshawar.
- Sher Ali Afridi, former policeman from Peshawar who assassinated Lord Mayo, the Viceroy of India, in 1872.
- Tariq Geedar Afridi, Pakistani Taliban militant.
- Malik Wali Khan Kuki Khel Afridi, First Kashmir War veteran and activist of the Pashtunistan Movement in independent Pakistan.

=== Politicians ===
- Abbas Khan Afridi, Pakistani politician and businessman, founder and CEO of Afridi Traders. He has been a member of senate, federal minister and state minister.
- Asghar Khan, Pakistani Air Marshal who built up the Pakistan Air Force as its first Native Commander-in-Chief, served as President of Pakistan International Airlines and a pacifist human rights activist and politician serving as chairman of the Tehreek-e-Istiqlal.
- Ayub Afridi (politician), Pakistani senator.
- Lateef Afridi, Pakistani lawyer and politician.
- Malik Mehrun Nisa Afridi, twice member of the National Assembly of Pakistan from Pakistan Peoples Party.
- Mirza Muhammad Afridi, Pakistani politician and senator, Deputy Chairman of the Senate of Pakistan and a member of Pakistan Tehreek-e-Insaf.
- Shehryar Afridi, Pakistani politician.
- Zakir Husain, third president of India, from 13 May 1967 until his death on 3 May 1969.
- Muhammad Sohail Khan Afridi, Pakistani politician and 30th Chief Minister Of Khyber Pakhtunkhwa(KPK)

=== Sports ===
- Abbas Afridi, Pakistani cricketer.
- Ahmad Shahzad, Pakistani cricketer.
- Ashfaq Afridi, Pakistani cricketer.
- Ghaus Mohammad, Indian tennis player, first Indian to reach the quarterfinals at Wimbledon.
- Riaz Afridi, Pakistani cricketer and coach.
- Sameen Gul, Pakistani cricketer.
- Shaheen Shah Afridi, Pakistani cricketer.
- Shahid Afridi, Pakistani cricketer and former national captain.
- Umar Gul (of the Malak Din Khel clan), Pakistani international cricketer.
- Yasir Afridi, Pakistani footballer.

=== Writers ===
- Khatir Afridi, Pashto poet from Pakistan
- Josh Malihabadi, Indian and Pakistani Urdu poet, known as "Shaer-e-Inqilaab" (Poet of the Revolution).

=== Others ===
- Ahmad Kamal Faridi (Colonel Fareedi, Colonel Faridi), a character created by Ibn-e-Safi. Ibn-e-Safi showed in the novels number 52 and 117 (out of 125 novels) of Jasoosi Dunya (The Spy World) that Colonel Fareedi belongs to the Afridi tribe.
- Ayub Afridi, a drug smuggler from Pakistan.
- Shakeel Afridi, Pakistani physician who allegedly helped the CIA locate Osama bin Laden.
- Yahya Afridi, a Pakistani jurist who is currently serving as the chief justice of Pakistan since 26 October 2024. He previously served as a Justice of the Supreme Court of Pakistan since 28 June 2018. Prior to his elevation to the Supreme Court, Afridi served as chief justice of the Peshawar High Court from 2016 to 2018, and as a justice of the PHC from 2010 to 2016.
- Zeek Afridi, a Pashto singer from Peshawar
- Malik Muhammad Akbar Afridi Sepah, 1946–1998, former chieftain of the Bara of Khyber Agency, met Princess Diana and former British Prime Minister John Major during their visits to Peshawar, Pakistan.
- Malik Sher Muhammad Khan Afridi, chief of Sepah. He along with the Maliks of the Khyber Agency visited Kolkata by train from Peshawar along with Political Agent, Colonel Robert Warburton. He also was a key figure in the relations between the Pashtuns especially the Afridis and the British government during the 19th century, also mentioned in Warburton's book Eighteen Years in the Khyber.
- Pir Atta Muhammad Afridi, chief of Akhorwal clan in Dara Adam Khel and chairman of Akhorwal coal company famous for his strong leadership across the region of Dara Adam Khel to stabilize political and tribal instability.

== See also ==
- Jowaki Afridi Expedition
- Tirah campaign
- Afridi Colony, Karachi
- HMS Afridi
- Afridi class destroyer
- Sunbeam Afridi
