= Darra Adam Khel =

Tehsil in Khyber Pakhtunkhwa, Pakistan

Darra Adam Khel درہ آدم خیل
- Tehsil
- Location within Khyber Pakhtunkhwa Location within Pakistan
- Coordinates: 33.684°N 71.516°E
- Country: Pakistan
- Region: Khyber Pakhtunkhwa
- District: Kohat

Government
  - Chairman: Shahid Bilal (IND)
- Time zone: UTC+5 (Pakistan Standard Time)

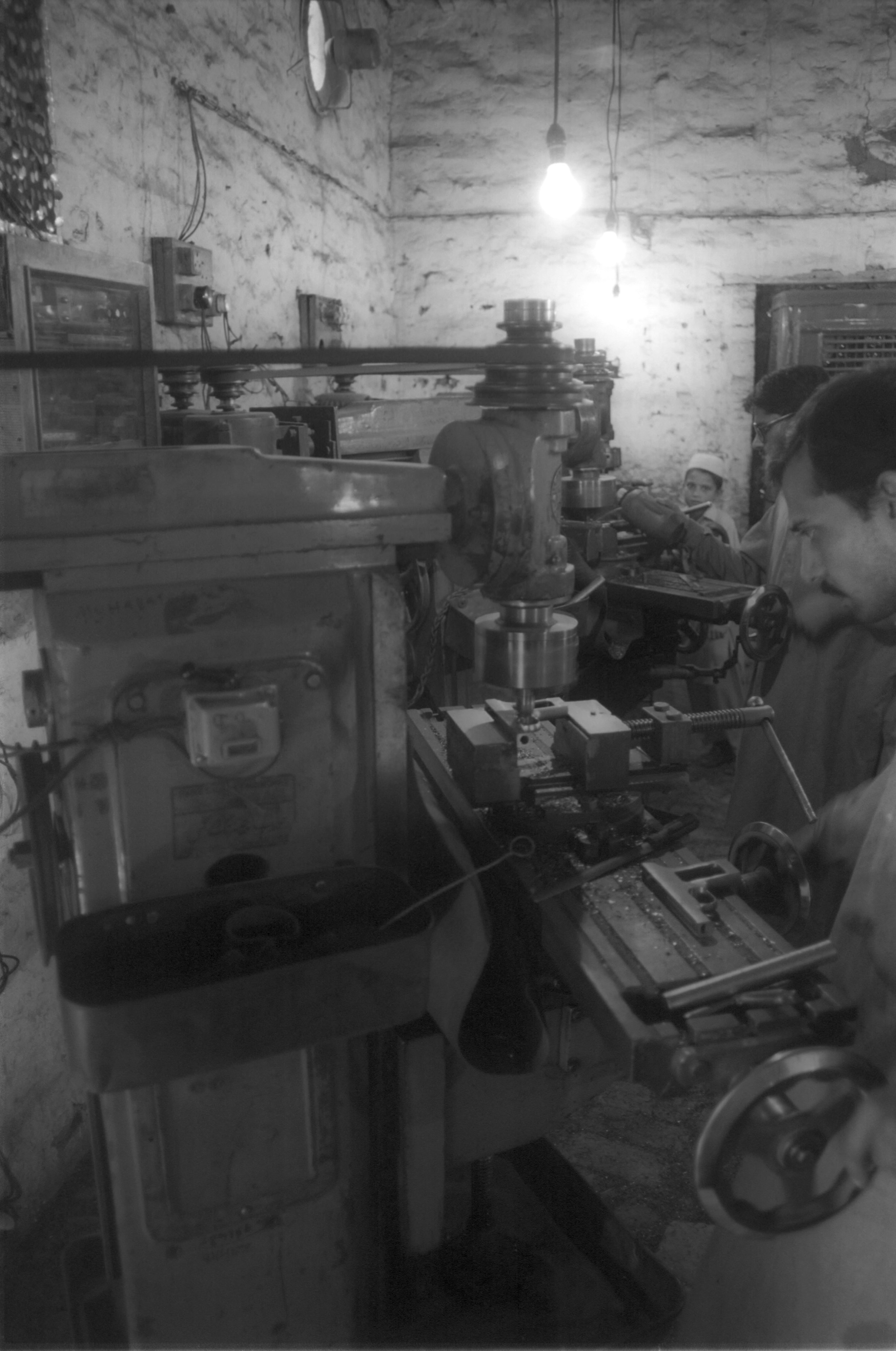
A local gun workshop.

Darra Adam Khel (Pashto: درہ آدم خیل) is the main town of Dara Adam Khel Tehsil (formerly known as "Frontier Region Kohat") in the Kohat District of Khyber Pakhtunkhwa, Pakistan. It has gained fame and notoriety for its bazaars packed with gunsmiths and weapons merchants. The town consists of one main street lined with multiple shops, while side-alleys and streets contain workshops.

== Economy ==
A wide variety of firearms are produced in the town, ranging from anti-aircraft guns to pen guns. Weapons are handmade by individual craftsmen using traditional manufacturing techniques, which are usually handed down from father-to-son. Guns are regularly tested by test-firing into the air. Darra is controlled by the local tribesmen. The town has certain special laws compared to the rest of Pakistan. Most of the people here make or sell just one thing, i.e., guns, while the second largest business of the inhabitants is transport. Manufacturing of heavy ammunition, however, has been closed down.

Tourism is not advisable because tribal police (Khasadar) visit the market to check for any local rules and law violations. Foreigners without permits are taken to secure places to avoid any mishaps.

The Darra arms trade first fired up in 1897 and became popular with the Adam Khel Afridis.

According to Vice News, the gun trade in the area was affected by Taliban and was forced to go underground.

== Tourism ==
Michael Palin visited the town as part of his Himalaya television series, as did Ethan Casey in his travel book Alive and Well in Pakistan while Australian film director Benjamin Gilmour's feature drama Son of a Lion set in Darra Adam Khel premiered at the Berlin International Film Festival 2008. Suroosh Alvi of Vice Media also entered the market-town in 2006 for a segment of Vice Guide to Travel.

== Notable people ==
- Ajab Khan Afridi
- Maulana Bijligar
- Tahir Afridi

== See also ==
- Gun culture in Pakistan
- Khyber Pass copy
