= September 2025 Tirah airstrike =

Pakistani airstrike in Tirah

- Part of Insurgency in Khyber Pakhtunkhwa
- Type: Airstrike
- Location: Tirah, Khyber Pakhtunkhwa, Pakistan
- Target: Pakistani Taliban
- Date: 22 September 2025
- Executed by: Pakistan Armed Forces; Pakistan Air Force
- Outcome: 30 civilians killed

On 22 September 2025, Pakistani jets carried out an airstrike in Tirah, Khyber Pakhtunkhwa killing at least 30 civilians. The Pakistani military did not comment on the strikes dismissing them as "baseless" however the strikes were condemned by the provincial government of Khyber Pakhtunkhwa which also announced that Rs 10m would be given to families of the victims.

== Attack and aftermath ==
The attack happened around 2 a.m. and destroyed at least five houses. Initially the police had claimed a massive explosion at a Taliban bomb factory had killed at least 10 civilians (including women and children) along with 14 militants, however hours later it was revealed at the provincial assembly that all those that had been killed were civilians and that jets were used in the attack. Thousands of people attended funerals of the victims and protested against the government.

The attack sparked anger online and the Human Rights Commission of Pakistan said it was "deeply shocked to learn about the number of civilians, including children that have been killed". Provincial MP Sohail Khan Afridi said that "This assault by the security forces is nothing less than an attack on unarmed civilians".

== See also ==
- 2025 Tirah Valley shooting
- Operation Sarbakaf
- Operation Azm-e-Istehkam
- Insurgency in Khyber Pakhtunkhwa
