= Ghazi Mir Bacha Khan Medal =

- Awarded for: civil and military officials of allied countries in recognition of their work to promote peace and security, and further economic and social development in Afghanistan.
- Country: Afghanistan
- Presented by: Afghanistan
- First award: 1982
- Final award: 2021 (last reported)

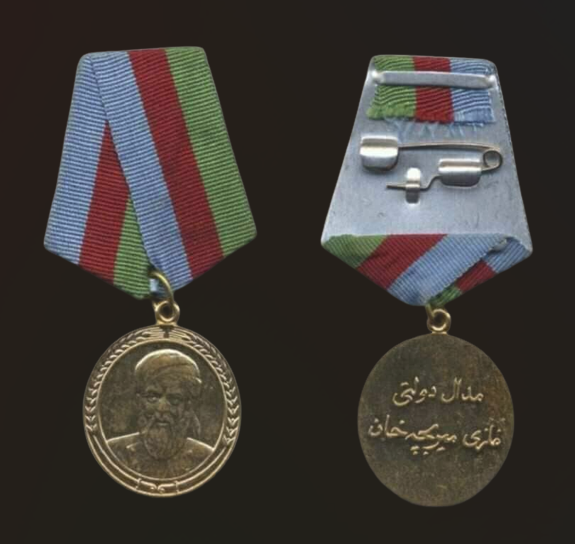
High State Medal of Ghazi Mir Bacha Khan: Obverse and Reverse

The Ghazi Mir Bacha Khan Medal is both a civilian and a military award, designated a High State Medal, in Afghanistan. The medal is named in honor of Ghazi Mir Bacha Khan, an ethnic Tajik from Mir Bacha Khan district, on the Shamali Plain, located to the north of Kabul city. The district was named for Mir Bacha Khan and people called him “Ghazi Mir Bacha Khan Kohdamani”. He a hero of the Second Anglo-Afghan War, 1878-80. The award is a tribute to Ghazi Mir Bacha Khan's legacy and his lifelong commitment to non-violent resistance and social justice.

== First and Second Anglo-Afghan Wars ==
A brief biography of Mir Bacha Khan, which especially accounts for his service in the Second Anglo-Afghan War, is included in the book by William Dalrymple (historian), "Return of a King: the Battle for Afghanistan" first published in 2013.

Ghazi Mir Bacha Khan is sometimes confused with Mir Masjidi Khan, a leader in the First Anglo-Afghan War, 1839-1842. Mir Masjidi Khan, who was from Kohistan district, Kapisa province, also on the Shamali Plain, opposed the installation of Shuja Shah Durrani (or 'Shah Shujah') as Emir of Afghanistan by the Government of British India. Mir Masjidi Khan was a religious figure and scholar of Persian literature. Mir Masjidi Khan led local Tajiks against the British army in the First Anglo-Afghan War. He was killed in 1841. Dalrymple also briefly covers Mir Masjidi Khan in "Return of a King".

Both Ghazi Mir Bacha Khan and Mir Masjidi Khan are two of the many celebrated Afghan resistance leaders from Shamali Plain who opposed the installation of Shuja Shah Durrani as Emir of Afghanistan.

== High State Medals ==
The High State Medal of Ghazi Mir Bacha Khan (Madal Dawalati Ghazi Mir Bacha Khan) recognizes the historical stature and role of Ghazi Mir Bacha Khan and is one of Afghanistan's highest awards. A further award, and one of the nation's highest civil awards for dedicated public service, is the High State Medal of Mir Masjidi Khan, in recognition of the historical stature and role of Mir Masjidi Khan.

== Awarding of the High State Medal of Ghazi Mir Bacha Khan ==
Established on 17 May 1982 by President Babrak Karmal, the High State Medal of Ghazi Mir Bacha Khan is awarded to both military and civilian recipients to recognize outstanding service in defensive sections of the country, the implementation of peace and security and also for other civilian and military tasks, including further economic and social development in Afghanistan. Notably, the Afghan President awarded the medal to senior NATO military commanders and senior officers. Civilian recipients of the High State Medal of Ghazi Mir Bacha Khan have included those who have made contributions in the areas of education, social work, human rights, public service and community development. It is not reported as to whether the awarding of the medal has continued under the Taliban regime.

== Description of the Medal ==
The High State Medal of Ghazi Mir Bacha Khan is circular in shape, and gold in appearance. The medal is suspended from a ribbon which is pale blue-red-pale green stripe. The obverse features the bust of Ghazi Mir Bacha Khan. The reverse carries raised words in Dari language "مدال دولتی غازی میربچه خان" which translates to "Ghazi Mirbacha Khan State Medal”. Dari is the Afghan dialect of Farsi (Persian language).

== Recipients of the High State Medal of Ghazi Mir Bacha Khan ==
- General John R. Allen, Commander of the International Security Assistance Force (ISAF), USMC, 15 December 2011
- General Egon Ramms, Operations Commander ISAF, Army Federal Republic of Germany, 30 September 2010
- Peter Erben, Chief Electoral Officer of Afghanistan, Denmark, 29 November 2005
- Prince Turki bin Faisal Al Saud, Chairman of the King Faisal Center for Research and Islamic Studies, 9 October 2019
- Lieutenant General William B. Caldwell IV, Commander of the NATO Training Mission-Afghanistan (NTM-A)/Combined Security Transition Command-Afghanistan (CSTC-A), US Army, 2010
- Tahir Afridi, Writer, Pakistan, November 2018
- Eimert van Middelkoop, Minister from Netherlands, 2010
- Dr Keith Clifford Bell AM RFD, Senior Technical Advisory Specialist, World Bank, Australia, 18 February 2018
- Colonel Donald Thomas, Command surgeon for the Combined Security Transition Command, US Air Force, April 2007,
- General Christopher K. Haas, Deputy Chief of Staff for Strategy and Plans for Resolute Support Mission, US Army, 25 June 2018
- Lieutenant General Rosario Castellano, Deputy Commander Resolute Support, Army Italy, 18 October 2017
- Wahid Wais, Chairman of Afghan Post, 27 December 2018
- Major-General Alan John Howard MSM CD, Army Canada, 16 April 2012
- Major-General David Gordon Neasmith OMM MSC CD, Assistant Commander for Afghan National Army development (NATO Training Mission), Army Canada, 25 October 2012
- Brigadier-General Gary O’Brien OMM MSC CD, Army Canada, 10 February 2011.
- Recipients from University of Peshawar, Pashto Academy and Nangarhar University - Hamesh Khalil, Tahir Afridi, Prof Abaseen Yousafzai, Noorul Bashr Naveed, Darwesh Durrani, Said Kher Muhmmad Arif, Shamim Shahid, Sufaid Shah Hamdard, Haroon Bacha, Alamzeb Khan, Arbab Mujeebur Rahamn Khalil, Syeda Hasina Gul and Dr Salma Shaheen, Pakistan, 15 November 2018
- Ustad Khayal Muhammad, Pashtun Singer, Pakistan, 17 November 2016
- Naqibullah Faiq, former governor of Faryab, Afghanistan, 28 April 2021 (Last reported awarding of medal)
- Peter Prugel, German Ambassador to Afghanistan, June 2020
- Recipients from the United States Geological Survey (USGS) - Dr. P. Patrick Leahy and Dr. Jack Medlin, 29 May 2006
- Manqushudin Nasimi, Afghan National Boxing Team, Afghanistan, 3 November 2012
