= Peter Erben =

Danish electoral manager

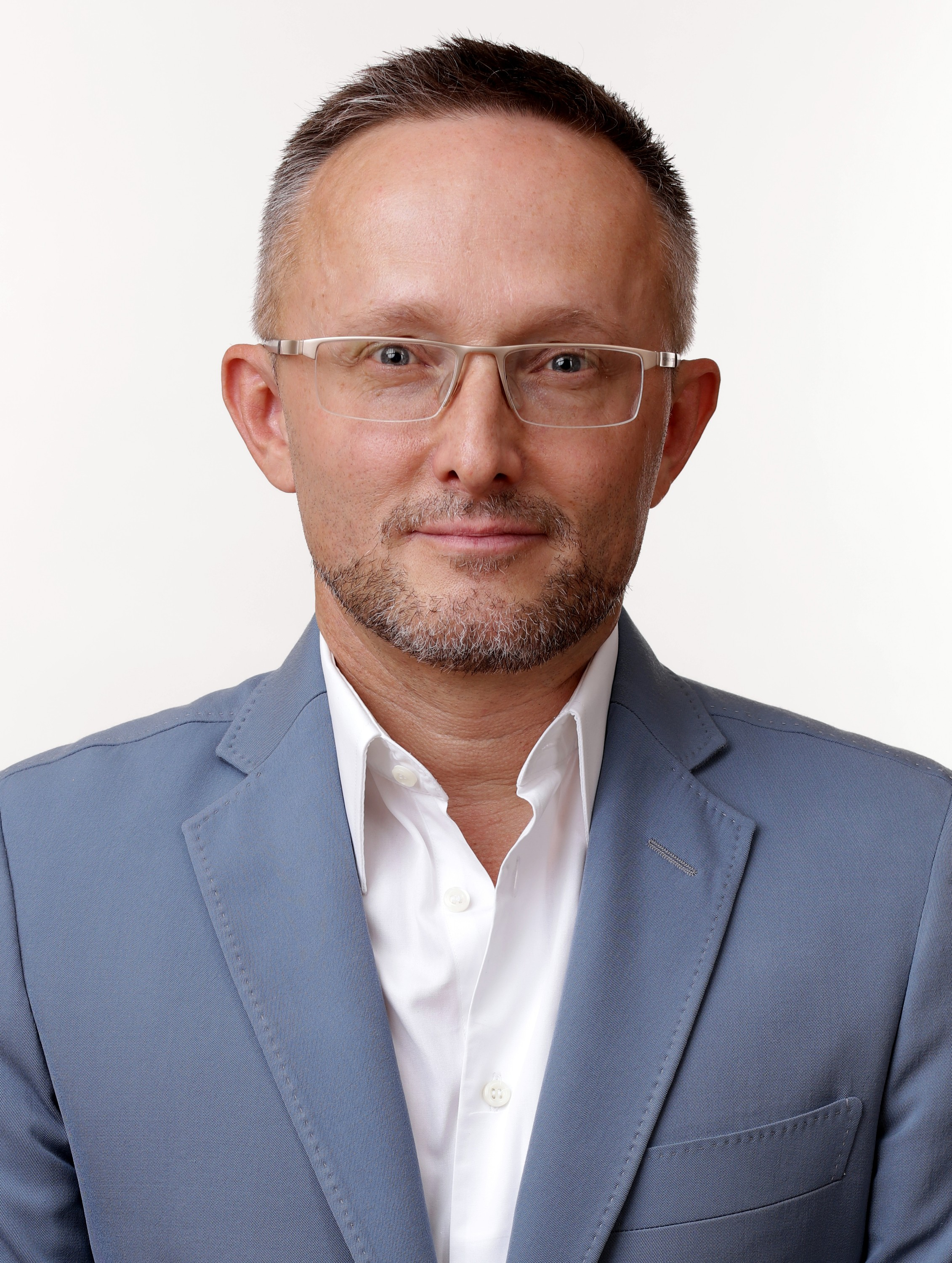
Peter Erben Aug 2016

Peter Erben is a senior electoral manager with global experience in directing, advising and supporting complex elections in post-conflict, transitional and developing countries, usually working for or along with the European Union, the Organization for Security and Co-operation in Europe (OSCE), the International Foundation for Electoral Systems and the United Nations.

== History ==
From 1992 to 1995, Peter Erben worked for the European Union Monitoring Mission (ECMM) as a political analyst during its effort to observe, report and mitigate conflicts as they swept the Balkans.

In 1996, Erben joined the Organization for Security and Cooperation in Europe (OSCE) in Bosnia and Herzegovina. While at the OSCE, he participated in managing the first four post-conflict elections, ending up as the Chief of Staff for the mission. With this experience, Peter Erben set out on a career focused on the management of elections and became one of a few international experts entrusted with directing elections for other nations.

In 2000, on behalf of the OSCE and the UN, he co-directed the first post-conflict election in Kosovo and became the Chief Electoral Officer of Kosovo for the second election in 2001.

In 2005, Erben was appointed by the UN and President Hamid Karzai as the Chief Electoral Officer of Afghanistan for its first parliamentary elections. In both Kosovo and Afghanistan, Peter Erben was, as the Chief Electoral Officer, a member of the Election Commission.ir

Erben also directed the Afghan out-of-country election in Pakistan and Iran in 2004, and the Iraq out-of-country worldwide election in 2005 which included countries such as Australia, France, the US, Syria, Iran and the United Arab Emirates. Together, these electoral operations engaged a total of over 250,000 staff at their peak, with combined budgets of over $300 million.

When not managing elections, Erben uses his experience to assist other nations in establishing and strengthening their electoral institutions. He acted as a senior adviser to election commissions and managed large donor assistance programs for the European Commission and the International Foundation for Election Systems (IFES) in places such as the Palestinian Territories, Nepal, Pakistan, Myanmar, Indonesia and Ukraine.

Erben has also worked on shorter assignments throughout the world, leading missions to Lebanon, the Philippines, Iraq, Georgia, Bangladesh, Libya, and other countries.

Today, Erben is the Senior Global Electoral Adviser responsible for providing support on substantive matters to IFES offices worldwide.

== Recognitions ==
On 17 November 2008, Queen Margrethe II of Denmark declared Peter Erben a Knight of the Order of the Dannebrog for his contribution to furthering democracy around the world.

On 29 November 2005, Peter Erben was awarded the Ghazi Mir Bacha Khan Medal Superior State Medal for having directed the Afghan 2005 national elections. This order is the highest award the Afghan nations bestows upon a non-Afghanistan individual. It was presented to Peter Erben by Mohammed Zahir Shah, Father of the Afghan Nation and former King of Afghanistan, in his Palace in Kabul.
