= Muhammad Amir Bijligar =

Pakistani Islamic scholar (1927–2012)

- مولانا محمد امیربجلی گھر
- Born: 1927; Billaki Khail (Darra Adam Khel)
- Died: 30 December 2012 (aged 84–85); Peshawar

Muhammad Amir Bijligar (Urdu: مولانا محمد امیر بجلی گھر) was an Islamic scholar and political leader. He was appointed Naib Ameer (نائب امیر جمیعت علماء اسلام) at the provincial level in 1969. He was a companion of Mufti Mahmud and played an active role in national politics, particularly in the 1970s and afterwards. He was sent to jail four times for his political activities during Martial Law regimes.

A lot of young people want to listen to bijligar's speeches because he used funny words and examples during his speeches.

== Overview ==
Muhammad Amir received his religious education at the Jamia Islamia Darul Uloomi Sarhad (جامعه اسلاميه دارالعلوم سرحد), a religious school in Peshawar, in 1950. He later joined the institution as a teacher and taught the Quran and Hadith, where a large number of students came to learn from him.

He was Imam of the mosque of Bijli Ghar. This led to him being known as Maulana Bijligar. He had shifted to Peshawar from Darra Adam Khel due to an enmity with some people in the semi tribal belt of Darra. He was popular among the people, particularly because of his criticism of the government and its policymakers. Audio cassettes of Bijligar's sermons gained popularity in Peshawar.

== Speeches ==
Mohammad Amir used to give speeches and sermons in Pashto, Urdu and Hindko language. He spoke on various topics and in his statements he strongly criticized leaders. He was visited by people from far away to hear his speeches. He went to jail for speaking out against leaders in three different periods.

== Death ==
He died on 30 December 2012, after a long illness. He left behind three sons and three daughters.

== See also ==
- List of Deobandis
