= Egon Ramms =

German general

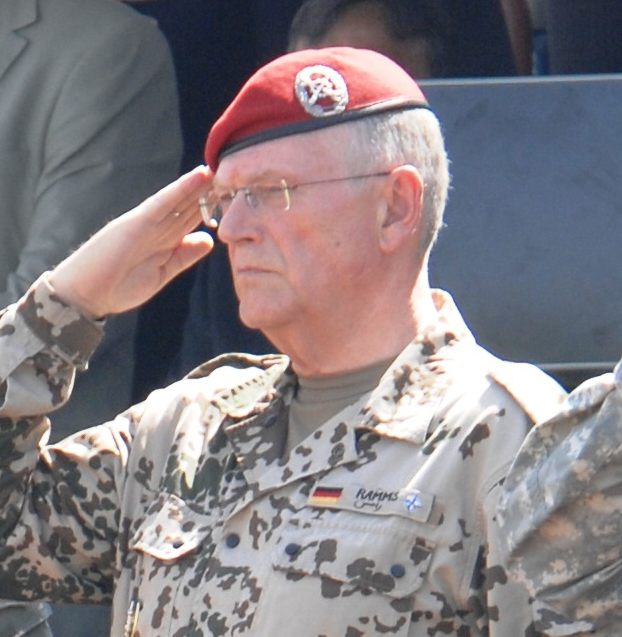
- General Egon Ramms in Afghanistan
- Born: 21 September 1948 (age 78); Datteln, Germany
- Military career
- Allegiance: Federal Republic of Germany
- Branch: Army
- Service years: 1968–2010
- Rank: General
- Unit: JFC-B
- Commands: CS Armed Forces Staff; Multinational Corps Northeast; Joint Force Command Brunssum
- Conflicts: War in Afghanistan

Egon Ramms (born September 21, 1948 in Datteln, North Rhine-Westphalia) is a retired German general who held numerous international commands. Ramms is a father of two.

His last assignment was commander of NATO's Joint Force Command in Brunssum, Netherlands. As such, he oversaw all allied operations in Central/ Northern Europe and Afghanistan.

Ramms joined the German Army in 1968, eventually becoming an officer candidate. From 1971 to 1975, he studied engineering at the Fachschule des Heeres Darmstadt and specialized in tank engineering. Afterwards he held numerous commands in maintenance units and became the G4 officer (logistics) of the German Army's 3rd Armoured Division. Subsequently he attended the German general staff officer course in Hamburg. In 1982, he was made G3 officer (operations) of the 6th Mechanized Infantry Division. Later on, he served as the G3 officer and chief of staff of the Home Defense Brigade 51. An assignment to the German military's office for arms control and disarmament followed. Ramms was made battalion commander of Maintenance Battalion 120 in 1988 and returned to the Ministry of Defence in 1990. For the next six years, he was assigned to numerous posts responsible for procurement and logistics. Promoted to brigadier general, he took command over Logistics Brigade 1 until 1998 when he was made Assistant Chief of Staff, Armed Forces Staff V (Logistics, Infrastructure and Environmental Protection). From 2000 to 2004, Ramms was the head of the German Armed Forces Staff at the headquarters in Bonn.

He assumed command over the Szczecin-based Multinational Corps Northeast in 2004, a post he held for the next two years. In 2007, Ramms was made commanding general, Joint Force Command Brunssum. He was one of only three German four-star-generals. In September 2010, on the day of his retirement, he was awarded the Ghazi Mir Bacha Khan medal from President Hamid Karzai of Afghanistan.

== Awards and decorations ==
- German Cross of Merit, 1st Class
- Gold Cross of Honour
- Silver Cross of Honour
- Order of Merit of the Republic of Poland, 3rd Class
- Ghazi Mir Bacha Khan medal (Afghanistan)

== See also ==
- Joint Prioritized Effects List

Military offices
Preceded by Lieutenant General Zygmunt Sadowski	Commanding General, Multinational Corps Northeast; 18 February 2004 – 15 December 2006	Succeeded by Lieutenant General Zdzisław Goral
