= Tahir Afridi =

Pakistani fiction writer (1939–2021)

- طاہر آفریدی
- Born: January 4, 1939; Hassan Khel Bodi Sokra, subdivision of Darra Adam Khel
- Died: June 6, 2021 (aged 82); Karachi
- Writing career
- Language: Pashto, Urdu
- Genre: fiction
- Notable awards: Pride of Performance (2022) posthumously Ghazi Mir Bacha Khan Medal

Tahir Afridi (4 January 1939 – 6 June 2021) was a prominent progressive and nationalist fiction writer of Pashto and Urdu language from Pakistan. He was a travel writer and founder and editor of the quarterly "Jaras".

Afridi was born on 4 January 1939 in the village of Hassan Khel Bodi Sokra, subdivision of Darra Adam Khel.

Initially, Tahir used to write poetry under the name of Asar, but later started writing fiction under the name of Tahir Afridi and gained fame under that name. He moved to Karachi in 1961. Initially, he worked as a car cleaner. He later formed his own company and moved to Karachi with his family in 1973. His family still resides in the metropolis.

He wrote and published his first novel ("Sta Na Pe Gham Ke Kama Naam") in 1961. The first collection of his fictions is "De Mahalno Khawa Ke" (in the shadow of palaces), the second collection of fiction is "Pandey Pandey" (Berg Dar Berg), the third collection is "Deedan" in Urdu, the fourth collection is "Lara Ke Makham" (on the way). Syria) and according to him this Firdous Haider was impressed by the legendary collection and was asked. The fifth legendary collection "Bia Hagha Makham De" (Then it's the same evening), the sixth legendary collection "Noor Khobuna Na Venam" (And I will not dream), the seventh legendary collection "Zanzeer Tarle Khoob" (Locked Dream), the eighth legendary collection Write the tenth and last legendary collection "Stasara Khabar A" (Dialogue with you), the tenth and last mythological collection "Moda Pas Ashna Raagle" (After a while Sanam has come) called the Imam of Modern and Symbolic Fiction in Literature.

Similarly, he traveled to many countries, the record of which he wrote in the form of travelogues and reportage, which are as follows, "Safar Pe Khair" (Safar Bakhir), "Safar Madam Safar" (Safar Dar Safar), "Janan Mein Qatar Teh Rawan De" and "Laar Sheh Pekhur Teh", the names of these reporters are taken from the famous Pashto folk songs which have been translated, respectively (Going to Peshawar), they also include another travelogue "Zha Che Zoo Kabul Teh" (Let's go to Kabul).

Tahir Afridi also tried his hand at writing novels and wrote the first Pashto novel "Kando Ke Raguna" (Rag Sang) which has been translated into Urdu by Prof. Asir Mangal under the name of "These People of Kehsaron". He wrote a novel in Urdu, "Teri Aankhein Khoob Soorat Hai" which has been translated into Pashto by our friend poet, writer and journalist Barak Mian Khel under the name of "Sheen Starge". He wrote the last novel, "Tarbuzak" (niqab), which describes the present and contemporary reality of the situation.

He has compiled a book based on the monthly literary criticism of the Jaras Adabi Jirga, entitled "Zah Tanqid Kho Beh Kama" (I will continue to criticize). He also compiled a book on the lines of Amir Hamza Khan Shinwari, a famous poet of Pashto literature. In addition, a book on various subjects by Tahir Afridi has recently been published by the Pashto Academy Quetta under the title "Adabi Pandey" (literary worksheet). Tahir Afridi founded the Jaras Adabi Jirga in Karachi in 1990 and also launched the Jaras Pashto Literary Magazine.

Tahir Afridi died in Karachi on 6 June 2021 at the age of 82 after a long illness. His funeral prayers were offered at Shermir, a neighborhood near his hometown of Bora, and he was buried there.
