= HMS Afridi =

Two ships of the Royal Navy have borne the name HMS Afridi, after the Afridi ethnic group in present-day Pakistan:

- HMS Afridi (1907) was a Tribal-class destroyer launched in 1907 and sold in 1919. She was wrecked in 1920.
- HMS Afridi (F07) was a Tribal-class destroyer launched in 1937. She was sunk by German air attack in 1940.
