= Afridi (surname) =

Afridi is a surname occurring in Pakistan. Notable people with the surname include:

- Abbas Khan Afridi (1970–2025), Pakistani politician and businessman
- Ashfaq Afridi (born 1987), Pakistani cricketer
- Ayub Afridi (drug lord), Pakistani drug lord
- Ayub Afridi (politician), Pakistani senator
- Hina Afridi (born 2001), Pakistani actress
- Khatir Afridi (1929–1968), Pakistani poet
- Lateef Afridi (1943–2023), Pakistani lawyer and politician
- Shaheen Afridi (born 2000), Pakistani cricketer
- Shahid Afridi, Pakistani cricketer
- Shakil Afridi, Pakistani physician who allegedly helped the CIA locate Osama bin Laden
- Shehryar Khan Afridi, Pakistani politician
- Zeek Afridi, Pakistani singer
