= Bagh Maidan =

Bagh Maidan is a village in Lower Dir District of Khyber Pakhtunkhwa, Pakistan. The name derives from the words bagh, meaning "garden", and maidan, meaning "plane area".

== Geography ==
Bagh is located around four hours' travel by road from the city of Peshawar. It is within the district administered by Timergara, and Kumber supplies the nearest bazaar. The village is surrounded by the Sheklaie and Seyasand mountains, with further ranges to the west and south. The river Lawee Khwarr runs to the west of the village.

== Facilities ==
The village is known for its boys' secondary school, which has a large intake. The village was also famous during the movement against the Nawab of Dir. The Bagh Malik (Abdul Hameed Khan) or Thor Lali Malik and Malik Abdul Hakeem Khan sons of Malik Muhammad Kamal were the men behind the unification of the state of Dir with Pakistan in 60s.

== Famous tribe's name ==
Its name is Kaloot Khel, which belongs to Bagh Maidan (plane garden area).
