= Central Executive Committee of the Pakistan Peoples Party =

Central Executive Committee كميٹي اجراییه مرکزی

Leadership
- Principal Officer(s): Chairman
- Executive Officer(s): Vice-Chairmen
- Secretaries: Secretaries of the Peoples Party
- Presidium Officer(s): Presidents; Vice Presidents
- Seats: Varied

Meeting place
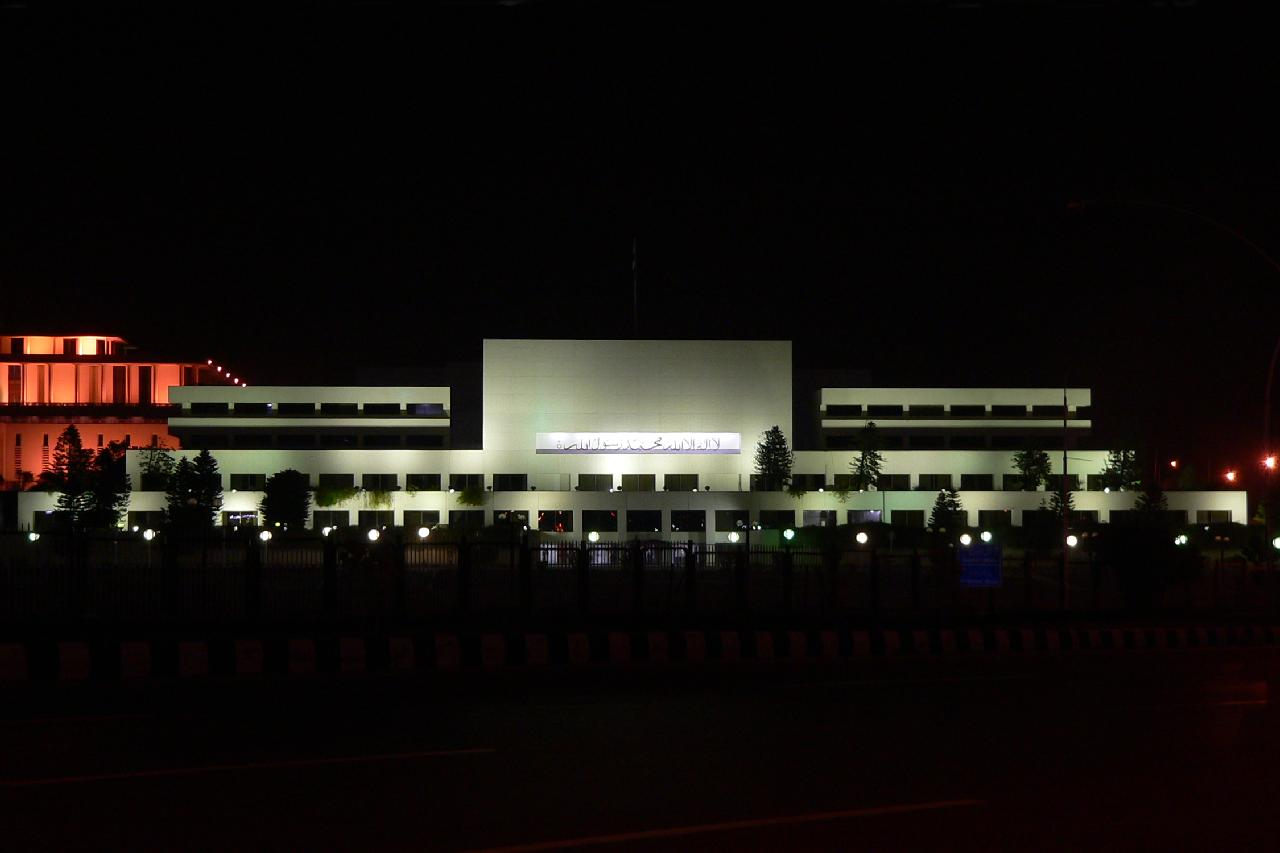
- The People's Secretariat at the Parliament House, Islamabad

Website
- official site

The Central Executive Committee of the Pakistan Peoples Party of Pakistan (Urdu: كميٹي اجراییه مرکزی; otherwise known as Core Committee, is an apex and De jure supreme governing authority of Pakistan Peoples Party— a centre-left and democratic socialist political party.

The central committee directed and supervised all party policies and government activities (if only in power) at central government and provisional level.

Its executive officer consists of chairman (as well co-chairman at present) and numbers of presidents, vice-presidents, and vice-chairmen. The central committee may appoints many of the most powerful people in the country, including general-secretaries, presidents, vice-presidents of the party.

In party's hierarchy, the central executive committee is the highest and powerful governing authority and it has final jurisdiction over all the party decision. During the times of Zulfikar Ali Bhutto, it acted as the highest party authority and had control over the enforcement of all economic, scientific, industrial, public and social policies in the country. During the 1980s, it served as the ground base and the ideological headquarter of the Movement for the Restoration of Democracy (MRD) to take down the Islamist military dictatorship of General Zia-ul-Haq.

The number of its members are vary and the central executive committee does not have any limitations as it goes to the membership of the party. The central committee coordinates activities between Federal Councils and Provisional Presidium and Secretariat Generals at the provisional levels. It is the highest organ of Party's structural leadership and plays a minor role in government policy formations and enforcement. The central executive committee is currently headquartered in the People's Secretariat at the Parliament House.

== Central Executive Committee of the Pakistan Peoples Party ==
The Secretariat-General of the Central Executive Committee is currently headquartered in the People's Secretariat at the Parliament. The central executive committee (CEC) is chaired and directed by an elected and designated chairman (or either co-chairman) who convened all the party meeting at higher level, usually chairman's decision is considered final decision.

Office Barriers and Presidents of the Central Executive Committee of the Pakistan Peoples Party
Chairpersons
Order	Office holder	Term started	Term ended
1	Zulfikar Ali Bhutto	November 30, 1967	April 4, 1979
2	Nusrat Bhutto	April 4, 1979	January 10, 1984
3	Benazir Bhutto	January 10, 1984	December 27, 2007
4	Asif Ali Zardari	December 27, 2007	March 29, 2013
5	Bilawal Bhutto	December 27, 2007	Incumbent
Vice Chairpersons
Order	Office holders	Government assignment	Major office bearers
1	None	None	Vice Chairman
Secretaries
Order	Office holders	Secretaries	Member of Parliament
1	Humayun Khan	Secretary General	None
2	Amna Piracha	Secretary Finance	None
3	Nadeem Afzal Chan	Secretary Information	None
Presidents
Order	Office holders	Government assignment	Provinces
1	Raja Pervaiz Ashraf	None	President, Central Punjab and Ex officio member
2	Makhdoom Ahmed Mehmood	None	President, South Punjab and Ex officio member
3	Nisar Ahmad Khuhro	Member of Senate	President, Sindh and Ex officio member
4	Syed Muhammad Ali Shah Bacha	None	President, Khyber Pakhtunkhwa and Ex officio member
5	Sardar Umar Gorgaij	None	President, Balochistan and Ex officio member
6	Ch. Muhammad Yasin	None	President, Azad Kashmir and Ex officio member
7	Amjad Hussain Azar	None	President, Gilgit-Baltistan and Ex officio member

Updated as of 20 October 2025
