= Anglo-Afghan War =

Topics referred to by the same term

Anglo-Afghan Wars may refer to:

- First Anglo-Afghan War (1838–1842)
- Second Anglo-Afghan War (1878–1880)
- Third Anglo-Afghan War (1919)

== See also ==
- European influence in Afghanistan, where the backdrop for the three colonial-era Anglo−Afghan wars mentioned above is discussed
- The Great Game, where the geopolitical aspects of the wars are reviewed
- War in Afghanistan, overview of different periods or phases of wars in Afghanistan
