= Ajab Khan Afridi =

Pashtun independence fighter

- عجب خان اپریدی
- Born: c. 1866; Darra Adam Khel, Frontier Tribal Areas, British India (present-day Khyber Pakhtunkhwa, Pakistan)
- Died: 8 January 1961 (aged 94–95); Mazār, Balkh, Afghanistan
- Resting place: Mazar-i-Sharif, Afghanistan
- Known for: Indian independence movement against the British Raj

Ajab Khan Afridi (Pashto: عجب خان اپریدی) was an Afghan guerrilla fighter from Darra Adam Khel in the former Frontier Tribal Areas belonging to the Afridi tribe of Pashtuns. Following a raid on his house by a British Indian Army detachment in 1923, Afridi declared it a personal affront to his honor and was ordered by his mother to take revenge on the army officers who had led the raid.

Afridi, along with four other villagers, attacked Kohat Cantonment. The wife of a British officer, Major Ellis, was stabbed and killed during the attack and they kidnapped Ellis' daughter, Mollie.

Ajab Khan and his men also fought numerous skirmishes with British soldiers.

On 8 January 1961, Ajab Khan Afridi died at the age of 95 in Mazar-i-Sharif in the Balkh Province of the Kingdom of Afghanistan.

== Legacy ==
Ajab Khan Afridi was a vicious fighter as a hero in the Khyber Pakhtunkhwa province, inspiring three films about his life. The 1961 Urdu language film "Ajab Khan" depicted his battles against the British. In 2018, a statue of Ajab Khan Afridi was erected at Abbas Chowk in his hometown, Darra Adam Khel, Khyber Pakhtunkhwa, Pakistan.

== See also ==
- Rai Ahmad Khan Kharal
- Mai Bakhtawar
- Nizam Lohar
- Hemu Kalani
- Kadu Makrani
- Bhagat Singh
