= Tirah =

Region in north-western Pakistan

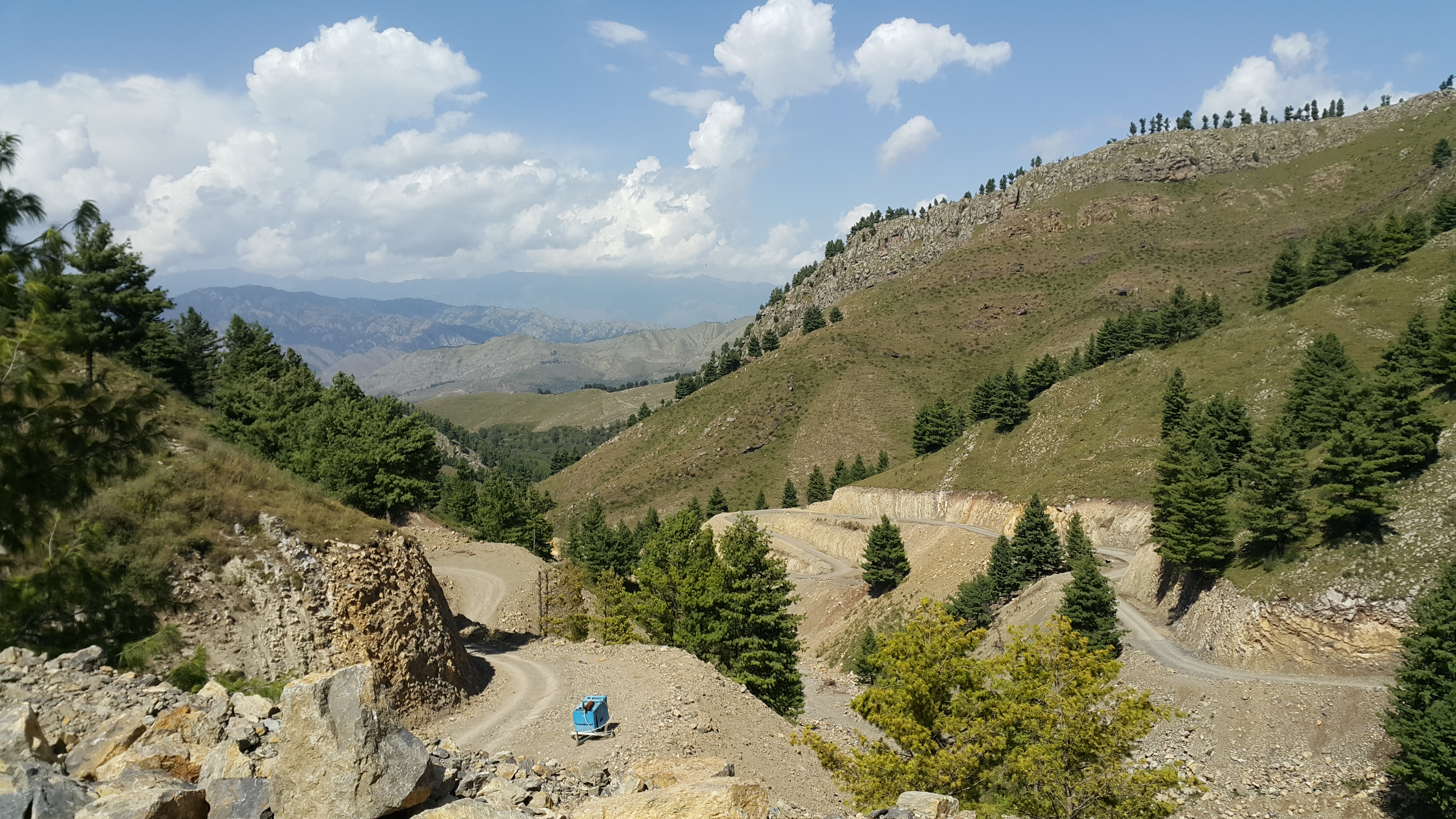

Naming
- Native name: Urdu: وادئ تیراہ; Pashto: د تیرا دره

Geography
- Population centers: Aka Khel

Tirah, also called the Tirah Valley (Urdu: وادئ تیراہ; Pashto: د تیرا دره), and sometimes spelled Terah (Pashto: تیراہ), is a mountainous region located in the Orakzai District and the southern portion of the Khyber District, positioned between the Khyber Pass and the Khanki Valley in Pakistan. Due to its proximity to the Afghan-Pakistan border and challenging terrain, maintaining control of Tirah has been historically difficult for the Government of Pakistan. In 2003, for the first time since Pakistan's independence, the Army entered the Tirah Valley.

The region is predominantly inhabited by Pashtuns, with minority communities referred to as Hamsaya (protected peoples), including a Sikh community primarily involved in trade and other professions.

== History ==
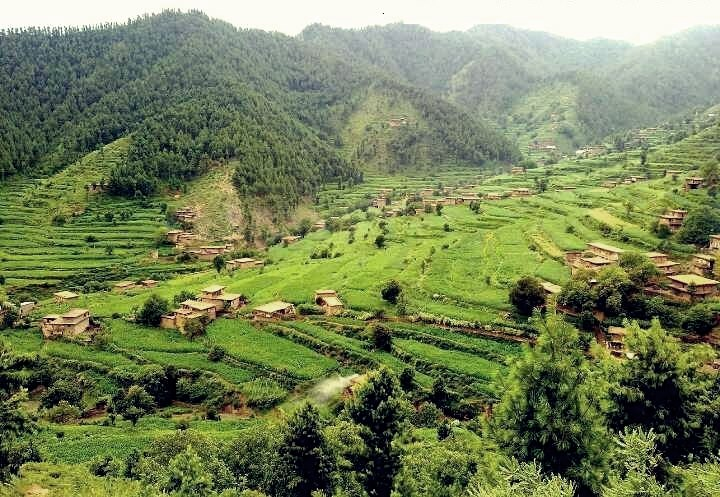
A photo of the Tirah Valley when it's verdant.

The ancient inhabitants of Tirah and the surrounding areas were the Tirahis, an Indo-Aryan ethnic group, who were driven out of the country by Pir Roshan; and a remnant of them fled to Nangarhar. Soon afterwards, in 1619 or 1620, Mahabat Khan, Subahdar of Kabul under the emperor Jahangir, treacherously massacred 300 Daulatzai Orakzai, who were Roshania converts; and, during his absence on a visit to Jahangir at Rohtas, Ghairat Khan was sent with a large force via Kohat to invade Tirah. He advanced to the foot of the Sampagha pass, which was held by the Roshanias under Ihdad and the Daulatzai under Malik Tor.

The Rajputs attacked the former and the latter were assailed by Ghairat Khan's own troops, but the Mughal forces were repulsed with great loss. Six years later, however, Muzaffar Khan, son of Khwaja Abdul Hasan, then Subahdar of Kabul, marched against Ihdad by the Sugawand pass and Gardez, and after five or six months' fighting Ihdad was shot and his head sent to Jahangir. His followers then took refuge in the Lowaghar; and subsequently Abdul Kadir, Ihdad's son, and his widow Alai, returned to Tirah. The death of Jahangir in 1627 was the signal for a general uprising of the Pashtuns against the Mughal domination. Muzaffar Khan was attacked on his way from Peshawar to Kabul, and severely handled by the Orakzai and Afridis, while Abdul Kadir attacked Peshawar, plundered the city, and invested the citadel.

Abdul Kadir was, however, compelled by the jealousy of the Afghans to abandon the siege and retire to Tirah, whence he was induced to come into Peshawar. There he died in 1635. The Mughals sent a fresh expedition against his followers in Tirah; and Yusuf, the Afridi, and Asar Mir, the Orakzai chief, were at length induced to submit, and received lands at Panipat near Delhi. Simultaneously operations were undertaken in Kurram. Yet, in spite of these measures, Mir Yakut, the imperial Diwan at Peshawar, was sent to Tirah in 1658 to repress an Orakzai and Afridi revolt. Since the decay of the Mughal empire Tirah has been virtually independent, though owning at times a nominal allegiance to Kabul.

Tirah was chiefly notable as the scene of the Tirah Campaign that the British launched in 1897. It was a cul-de-sac in the mountains and the difficulty of its passes and the fierceness of its inhabitants had hitherto preserved it inviolable from all invaders.

According to a legend a group of Pashtuns living in Tirah, the Orakzai, got their name from an exiled prince from far away Persia.

A sub tribe known as the Oriya Khel belonged to the Zaka Khel clan of the Afridi tribe. They inhabited the Tirah Valley and are now located in Cherat Saleh Khana. Although they now fall under the Khattak tribe, the Oriya Khel acknowledge their lineage and still continue to call themselves Afridi. This can be proven as the land records of Saleh Khana showed they initially belonged to Afridis and to this day the inhabitants have not changed. Furthermore the villagers of Saleh Khana still wear their turbans and grow their moustache like Afridis, customs which have been passed down by the elders.

Since 2011, the security situation in the Tirah Valley has steadily deteriorated due to ongoing conflict between numerous armed militant groups, primarily the Tehreek-i-Taliban Pakistan (TTP) and Lashkar-e-Islam, and Pakistan Security Forces. This conflict has led to the displacement of over one million people, forced from their homes by rising extremism and militancy.

On 28 July 2025, there was a mass shooting by unknown assailants against local protestors outside of a Frontier Corps brigade headquarter. Six of the protesters were killed and 15 were injured.

On 22 September 2025, an air strike killed at least 30 while trying to target TTP militants.

== Geography ==
Tirah comprises an area of some six to seven hundred square miles and includes under this general name all the valleys lying round the source of the Bara River. The five chief valleys are Maidan, Rajgul, Waran, Bara and Mastura. Maidan, the summer home of the Afridis, lies close under the snow-bound ridges of the Safed Koh at an elevation of about 7,400 ft (2,300 m). It is an oval plain about seven to eight miles (13 km) long, and three or four wide, and slopes inwards towards the centre of its northern side, where all the drainage gathered from the four corners of the plain is shot into a narrow corkscrew outlet leading to the Bara Valley.

Centuries of detritus accumulated in this basin have filled it up with rich alluvial soil and made it one of the most fertile valleys on the frontier. The terraced, revetted, and irrigated slopes are highly productive. Two storey mud and timber houses are shaded by large walnut and mulberry trees. Forests surrounding the Maidan basin include wild olives and occasional pomegranates.

Higher still are the blue pines; but below on the shelving plains are mainly fruit trees. Rajgul Valley lies north of Maidan, from which it is separated by a steep valley and well-wooded spur, eight to nine thousand feet high, and west of the Bara Valley, which it joins at Dwatoi. It is ten miles (16 km) long, four to five miles (8.0 km) at its widest, and has an elevation of 5,000 ft (1,500 m). It is inhabited by the Kuki Khel Afridis. The Waran Valley is another valley about the same size as Maidan, lying east of it, and separated from it by the Tseri-Kandao Pass. It was the home of the Afridi mullah Sayad Akbar. and is the country of the Aka Khels. After the junction of the Rajgul and Maidan drainage at Dwatoi, the united stream receives the name of Bara, and the valley through which it flows down to its exit in the Peshawar Valley is also known by this name. The elevation of the valley is from 5,000 ft (1,500 m). at Dwatoi to 2000 at Kajurai; on the north side it is hemmed in by the Surghar range, which divides it from the Bazar Valley; on the south lies another range dividing it from Maidan and the Waran Valley.

The heat of the Bara Valley in summer is said to be excessive, malaria is prevalent, and mosquitoes very troublesome, so the hamlets are deserted and the Afridis migrate to the pleasant heights of Maidan. The Mastura Valley occupies the southern half of Tirah, and is inhabited by the Orakzais. It is one of the prettiest valleys on the frontier, lying at an elevation of 6,000 ft (1,800 m). The Orakzais live, for the most part, in the Miranzai Valley, in the winter, and retreat to Mastura, like the Afridis, during the summer months.

The chief passes in Tirah are the Sampagha Pass (6,500 ft), separating the Khanki Valley from the Mastura Valley; the Arhanga Pass (6,99E ft.), separating Mastura Valley from Maidan; Saran Sar (8,650 ft), leading from the Zakka Khel portion of Maidan into the Bara Valley; the Tseri Kandao (8,575 ft), separating Maidan from the Waran Valley, and the Sapri Pass (5,190 ft), leading from the east of the Mastura Valley into the Bara Valley in the direction of Mamanai. The whole of Tirah was thoroughly explored and mapped at the time of the Tirah Campaign.

== Recent Events: Conflict, displacement, and an uneasy peace ==
In the 21st century, the Tirah Valley became a major theater of conflict in Pakistan's war on terror. The locals were displaced and faced the toughest time of their lives, especially after the Soviet and then the US invasion of Afghanistan

=== Rise of militancy ===
Following the U.S. invasion of Afghanistan in 2001, the valley's remote terrain became an ideal sanctuary for various militant groups. The Tehrik-i-Taliban Pakistan (TTP) and its affiliates, along with the Ansar al-Islam and the powerful local group Lashkar-e-Islam (LI), led by commander Mangal Bagh, established strongholds in the valley. They imposed a strict version of Islamic law, challenged the state's authority, and used the area to launch attacks in other parts of Pakistan.

=== Military operations and displacement ===
To re-establish its control, the Pakistan Armed Forces launched a series of major military operations in the mid-2010s, most notably Operation Khyber-I (2014) and Operation Khyber-II (2015). These operations involved intense ground and air campaigns aimed at clearing militant sanctuaries.

The fighting resulted in a massive humanitarian crisis. The vast majority of the valley's population, estimated at over half a million people, was forced to flee their homes, becoming Internally Displaced Persons (IDPs). Many sought refugees in camps like Jalozai or with host families in settled districts of Khyber Pakhtunkhwa. Thousands of men got arrested and killed of suspected links to the commanders of Taliban.

=== Return and current situation ===
After the successful conclusion of military operations around 2017–2018, the government began facilitating the return of the displaced population. The security situation has significantly improved, and a sense of normalcy is gradually returning. However, the challenges remain immense:

- Security: While large-scale militant control is gone, the region remains fragile. There are sporadic security incidents and concerns about the re-emergence of militant cells, particularly due to the porous border with Afghanistan. A heavy presence of Pakistani security forces remains to maintain peace.
- Reconstruction: The conflict left infrastructure, including schools, clinics, and homes, severely damaged or destroyed. The government and army have been involved in reconstruction efforts, but progress is slow.
- Economic Hardship: The local economy, which historically relied on smuggling and subsistence agriculture, was devastated. Reviving livelihoods and creating sustainable economic opportunities is a major priority.
- Administrative Merger: Following the 2018 merger of FATA with Khyber Pakhtunkhwa, the valley is now under the regular legal and administrative system of Pakistan, ending the era of the FCR. The transition is ongoing and aims to bring governance and development to the region.

== Notable persons ==
- Sher Ali Afridi – An assassin of Lord Mayo, the Viceroy of India
- Mir Mast Afridi – Pashtun defector of the British army in World War I to the Ottoman cause who organised the Afghans to fight the British Indian Empire at the border area

== See also ==
- Tirah Memorial
