= Maidan (Tirah) =

Valley in Khyber Agency, Pakistan

Maidan, or Tirah Maidan, is a remote valley located in the Tirah region in Khyber Agency, Pakistan.

== Description ==
Maidan lies at an elevation of about 7,400 ft (2,300 m), close under the snow-bound Spin Ghar mountain range, which separates it from the Shinwar area of Nangarhar, Afghanistan. It is drained by a narrow outlet which joins the Bara River. Despite the sloping plateau, Tirah is highly cultivated by terracing. There are walnut trees, mulberry and apricot, as well as wild olives and occasional pomegranates, and blue pine covers the summits. But on the whole, Maidan is sparsely wooded.

Afridis migrate to the pleasant heights of Maidan in summer from lower altitude areas like the Bara Valley. The Saran Sar Pass at (8,650 ft) connects Maidan with the Bara Valley. The Tseri Kandao Pass (8,575 ft) connects Maidan with the Waran Valley to the east, and the Arhanga Pass (7,050 ft) connects Maidan with the Mastura Valley to the south. The Rajgul Valley lies to the northwest, between Maidan and the Spin Ghar mountain range.
