= Ghurghushto =

Coordinates: 34°13′N 72°31′E

- Union Council
- Interactive map of Ghurghushto
- Country: Pakistan
- Province: Khyber Pakhtunkhwa
- District: Buner
- Time zone: UTC+5 (PST)
- Number of towns: Mada khel
- Number of Union Councils: Budla khel

Ghurghushto is an administrative unit, known as Union council of Buner District in the Khyber Pakhtunkhwa province of Pakistan.

District Buner has 6 Tehsils i.e. Daggar, Chagharzai, Chamla, Khudu Khel, Gagra and Gadezai. Each tehsil comprises certain numbers of union councils. There are 27 union councils in Buner District.

== See also ==
- Buner District
- Totalai
- Khudu Khel
