= Pandir =

- Union Council
- Country: Pakistan
- Province: Khyber Pakhtunkhwa
- District: Buner
- Time zone: UTC+5 (PST)
- Number of towns: ADD HERE
- Number of Union Councils: ADD HERE

Pandir is an administrative unit, known as Union council of Buner District in the Khyber Pakhtunkhwa province of Pakistan.

District Buner has 6 Tehsils i.e. Daggar Chagharzai Chamla Khudu Khel Gagra Gadezai.. Each tehsil comprises certain numbers of union councils. There are 27 union councils in district Buner.

== See also ==
- Buner District
