= Dewana Baba =

- Union Council
- Country: Pakistan
- Province: Khyber Pakhtunkhwa
- District: Buner
- Time zone: UTC+5 (PST)
- Number of towns: ADD HERE
- Number of Union Councils: ADD HERE

Dewana Baba is an administrative unit, known as Union council of Buner District in the Khyber Pakhtunkhwa province of Pakistan.

District Buner has 6 Tehsils i.e. Daggar, Chagharzai, Chamla, Khudu Khel, Gagra and Gadezai. Each tehsil comprises certain numbers of union councils. There are 27 union councils in district Buner.

Dewana Baba has a large reputation as a business hub in the area. People from distant areas come here for their shopping needs, education, and healthcare. The town of Dewana Baba is surrounded by tall, green mountains. People visit this area for recreation and leisure activities. A small river flows in the middle of the town. This town is named after a great sufi sage Hazrat Dewana Baba, whose shrine is located in the center of the town. Hazrat Dewana Baba spent his entire life to inform people of the teachings of Islam. Thousands of people from all over the country visit the shrine of Hazrat Dewana Baba every year. The Dewana Baba town has also several well reputed teaching institutions which provide education to people of the entire area.

== See also ==
- Buner District
