= Kalan Kangalai =

- Union Council
- Country: Pakistan
- Province: Khyber Pakhtunkhwa
- District: Buner
- Time zone: UTC+5 (PST)
- Number of towns: ADD HERE
- Number of Union Councils: ADD HERE

Kalan Kangalai is an administrative unit, known as Union council of Buner District in the Khyber Pakhtunkhwa province of Pakistan.it is the town of district Buner as on the basis of population and development.

District Buner has 6 Tehsils i.e. Daggar Chagharzai Chamla Khudu Khel Gagra Gadezai.. Each tehsil comprises certain numbers of union councils. There are 27 union councils in district Buner.

== See also ==
- Buner District
