= Nawagai, Buner =

Administrative unit in Pakistan

Nawagai
- Union Council
- Country: Pakistan
- Province: Khyber Pakhtunkhwa
- District: Buner
- Time zone: UTC+5 (PST)
- Number of towns: ADD HERE
- Number of Union Councils: ADD HERE

Nawagai is a union council in Buner District in the Khyber Pakhtunkhwa province of Pakistan. Buner District is divided into six tehsils: Daggar, Chagharzai, Chamla, Khudu Khel, Gagra and Gadezai. Each tehsil consists of a designated number of union councils, with a total of 27 union councils across the district.
