= Chinglai =

- Union Council
- Chinglai
- Country: Pakistan
- Province: Khyber Pakhtunkhwa
- District: Buner
- Time zone: UTC+5 (PST)

Chinglai is an administrative unit, known as Union council of Buner District in the Khyber Pakhtunkhwa province of Pakistan. It is the 6th biggest Town of district Buner as per population. In year 2018 Its population is estimated to be about 19,545

District Buner has 6 Tehsils i.e. Daggar, Chagharzai, Mandanr, Khudu Khel, Gagra, Gadezai.. Each tehsil comprises certain numbers of union councils. There are 27 union councils in district Buner. Chinglai: One of the ancient and mysterious village of present-day district buner, kpk, Pakistan. Rarely discovered by historians. The village is surrounded by green and tall mountains. Village chinglai ( mentioned as Chinglee by English writers) has undiscovered ruins of gandahara civilizations. It is thought to be the entrance to swat in 2000 BC. The ancient remains of chinglai could be found in the eastern part called " bhru" across the main stream of the village. In past this village was attacked both by Mughals and English Armies but none of could accoupy it, Chinglai was mostly free region under the rule of its own Jarga, famously known as Da Chinglai Tabar, means axe of Chinglai. The village was also under the administrative control of panjtar in 18th century. This village, as similar to other Yousafzai villages has suffered from Da Pukhtu dawar, an era of law lessness and civil wars, probably from 1858 to 1942, when Buner accepted the rul of Miya gul abdul wadood, as Wali e Swat.

The surrounding villages are Swawai, Dandikot, Kalan, kangalai. In recent age work has been started to discover more about the village.

Meaning of word Chinglai:

There are two theories about name of Chinglai among the locals. One is saying that word Chinglai was originated from China-gali means that a village built nearer to a water source or water spring. Other say that it is Cheen-gali. Cheen means China and Gali means Path or Road. To prove the second theory people present the name of Darand a pass that connect valley of Chinglai to Regions of Swabi. According to these people Darand is short form of Dara-e-Hind, means road or path leading to India. Since the first one has no such proof so at this time it is more acceptable as compared to the first one.

For more detail you can read this

https://usmankhelvi-views.blogspot.com/2022/09/chinglai.html

== See also ==
- Buner District
