= Ellai =

- Union Council
- Country: Pakistan
- Province: Khyber Pakhtunkhwa
- District: Buner

Population (2017)
  - Total: 23,678
- Time zone: UTC+5 (PST)

Ellai is an administrative unit, known as Union council of Buner District in the Khyber Pakhtunkhwa province of Pakistan.

District Buner has 6 Tehsils i.e. Daggar, Chagharzai, Chamla, Khudu Khel, Gagra and Gadezai.. Each tehsil comprises certain numbers of union councils. There are 27 union councils in district Buner.

Elai have population of 23,678 as of 2017.

== See also ==
- Buner District
