= Gagra, Pakistan =

Gagra Tehsil تحصیل گاگرہ ګګرا تحصیل
- Tehsil
- Country: Pakistan
- Province: Khyber Pakhtunkhwa
- District: Buner
- Tehsil: Gagra
- Time zone: UTC+5 (PST)

Gagra is an administrative unit, known as tehsil of Buner District in the Khyber Pakhtunkhwa province of Pakistan.

District Buner has 6 Tehsils i.e. Daggar, Chagharzai, Chamla, Totalai, Gagra, Gadezai. Each tehsil comprises certain numbers of union councils. There are 27 union councils in Buner District.

== See also ==
- Buner District
