= Dagai =

Dagai may refer to:

- Dagai, Buner
- Dagai, Mardan
- Dagai, Swabi
