= Habib ur Rahman (politician) =

Pakistani politician

Habib ur Rahman Minister

Minister of Zakat & Usher, Auqaf, Hajj & Religious Affairs
- In office 17 June 2013 – 2 May 2018
- Preceded by: Mr.Muhammad Zarshid; Mr.Namroz Khan
- Constituency: PK-78 (Buner-II)

Personal details
- Born: 6 January 1948 Kalpani, Gagra, District Buner
- Died: 24 April 2021 (aged 73)
- Party: Jamaat-e-Islami Pakistan (JI)
- Occupation: Politician

Habib ur Rahman (Urdu: حبيب الرحمان) was a Pakistani politician hailing from Kalpani, Gagra, District Buner who served as minister of Zakat & Usher, Auqaf, Hajj & Religious Affairs in the Khyber Pakhtunkhwa Assembly from 2013 to 2018.

Rahman died from COVID-19 in 2021.
