= Dagai, Buner =

Dagai Dagiwal
- Village and Town
- Interactive map of Dagai
- Country: Pakistan
- Region: Khyber Pakhtunkhwa
- District: Buner District
- Tehsil: Khudu Khel
- union council: Totalai
- Time zone: UTC+5 (PST)
- Mahallahs: Khwajas Khel; Lal Khel; Musa Khel; Usman Khel

Dagai is a village and town in Buner District of Khyber Pakhtunkhwa.
