= Sartor Faqir =

19/20th-century Pashtun tribal leader

- Born: Saidullah Khan; Rega, Buner Valley
- Died: 1917
- Other names: Mullah Mastan, Mullah Mastana, Pipi Faqir, Saidullah, The Great Fakir, Mad Faqir, Mad Faqir of Swat, Mad Mullah
- Occupations: Tribal Yusufzai leader and freedom fighter
- Known for: leader of the 1897 Afghan frontier revolt

Sartōr Faqīr (Pashto: سرتور فقير; died 1917), also known as "Mullah Mastan or Mullah Mastana" Pipi Faqir or Saidullah in Pashto and by the British as "The Great Fakir" or "Mad Faqir", "Mad Faqir of Swat" or the "Mad Mullah", was a Pashtun tribal Yusufzai leader and freedom fighter. His name Mullah Mastan translates to "God-intoxicated" as a reference to his religious convictions and his belief that he was capable of miraculous powers and challenging the British Empire.

== Biography ==
Sartor Faqir was born as Saidullah Khan in the village of Rega in the Buner Valley and was a member of a branch of the Yousafzai tribe. In order to further his religious education, he lived and travelled throughout India and Central Asia, before setting in Mazar-i-Sharif in Afghanistan for a period of ten years. In 1895, he returned to Buner.

In response to the British occupation of the North West Frontier Province of modern-day Pakistan, and the division of Pashtun lands by the Durand Line, the Faqir declared a jihad against the British Empire, unsuccessfully in 1895, then successfully in 1897. In late July, he led from 10,000 to 100,000 Pashtun tribesmen in an uprising that culminated in the siege of Malakand, which ended with the British being relieved on August 2.

Although the Faqir continued to lead further attacks against the British, the siege of Malakand marked the height of his power and influence, which declined as the British made agreements with other local tribes and rulers to counter him. The Faqir eventually made his own agreements with the British government, with the revelation of an exchange of presents and correspondence with the British political officer of Malakand leading to accusations of the Faqir being in the pay of the British government. This and the Faqir's advancing years led to a further decline of his movement, which broke up upon his death in 1917.

== See also ==
- Mirzali Khan
- Saidu Baba
- Mullah Powindah
