= Operations of the Buner Field Force (1897–1898) =

British colonial operation against Pashtun tribes

The operations of the British Buner Field Force in the North-West Frontier Province from 1897-1898 were a response to the uprising of the Bunerwal tribe, Swati tribe, the Afridi tribe, the Jadoon, the Yusufzai as well as remnants of the Hindustanis. This caused Sartor Faqir to enjoin the people of Buner District to rebel.
