= Ghazikot =

Pakistani village

Coordinates: 34.279253°N 72.616847°E

Ghazikot is a village of Buner District in the Khyber-Pakhtunkhwa province of Pakistan. The village contains one health centre.
