= Haji Fazl-e-Raziq =

Pakistani politician

Member of the National Assembly of Pakistan
- In office 1977–1977
- In office 1988–1990

Personal details
- Born: Buner District, Pakistan

Haji Fazl-e-Raziq was a Pakistani politician from Buner District who served twice as a member of the National Assembly of Pakistan in 1977 and 1988 to 1990.
