= Nawagai =

Nawagai may refer to:

- Nawagai, Bajaur, Bajaur Agency, FATA, Pakistan
  - Nawagai Tehsil, Bajaur Agency, FATA, Pakistan
- Nawagai, Buner, Buner District, Khyber Pakhtunkhwa, Pakistan
