= Sawawai =

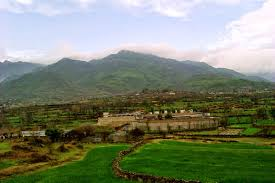
mountain appears next to Sawawai village in the north called "tangai"

Sawawai (صواوئ/ in Urdu, Pashto) is a small village of Buner District in KPK (Khyber Pakhtunkhwa), Pakistan with a population of about 1000 to 1500 people. It covers about 13.602 kilometres (8.452 mi), of total area with 0.25 km^{2} populated and the remaining covered largely with mountains,
