= Qaiser Wali Khan =

Pakistani politician

Qaiser Wali Khan MPA

Member of the Provincial Assembly of Khyber Pakhtunkhwa
- In office 2008–2013
- Constituency: PK-78 (Buner-II)

Personal details
- Party: Awami National Party (ANP)
- Occupation: Politician

Qaiser Wali Khan is a Pakistani politician from Buner District, who was a member of the Khyber Pakhtunkhwa Assembly from 2008 to 2013 belonging to the Awami National Party (ANP).
