= Totalai =

Coordinates: 34°11′42″N 72°30′00″E

Totalai / Dagai
- Union Council
- Totalai / Dagai
- Interactive map of Totalai / Dagai
- Country: Pakistan
- Province: Khyber Pakhtunkhwa
- District: Buner
- Time zone: UTC+5 (PST)
- Number of Mohallah: 1-Madakhil 2-Budlakhil 3-Youniskhil 4-Koz Youniskhil 5-JafarKhil 6- Quraish (Neighbor Village Dagai Khojaskhel, MosaKhel, Usmankhel, Lalkhel)
- Postal code: 23434

Totalai / Dagai is a union council of Buner District in the Khyber Pakhtunkhwa province of Pakistan. It is the capital of Khudu Khel tehsil. Dagai is the neighbor village bordering Swabi District.

Totalai / Dagai is located in the northwestern region of the country.

Totalai has a police station, a hospital (THQ), a private hospital named Gohar Hospital & Trust, degree colleges for men and women and many primary, middle, high, and secondary schools for boys and girls. It has an Office of the Magistrate.

Totalai is the gateway to Swat District and Buner. It was previously known as the Yusafzai State of Swat via Swabi.

There are 5 union councils in KhuduKhel and 27 union councils in whole district Buner.
