= Chamla =

Чамла Чамла
- Village
- Chamla
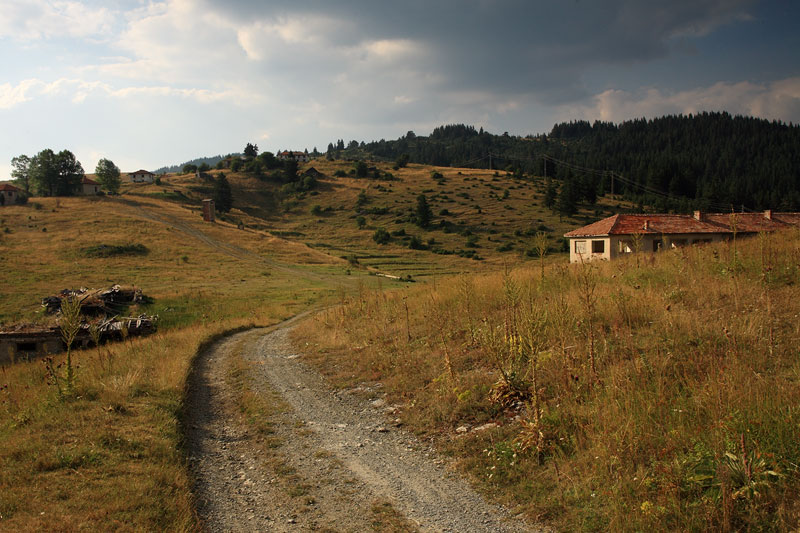

- Location in Bulgaria
- Coordinates: 41°37′N 24°27′E
- Country: Bulgaria
- Province: Smolyan Province
- Municipality: Smolyan
- Abandoned: 1980s
- Elevation: 5,410 ft (1,650 m)

Population (2015)
  - Total: 0
- Time zone: UTC+2 (EET)
- Postal code: 4848
- Vehicle registration: СМ

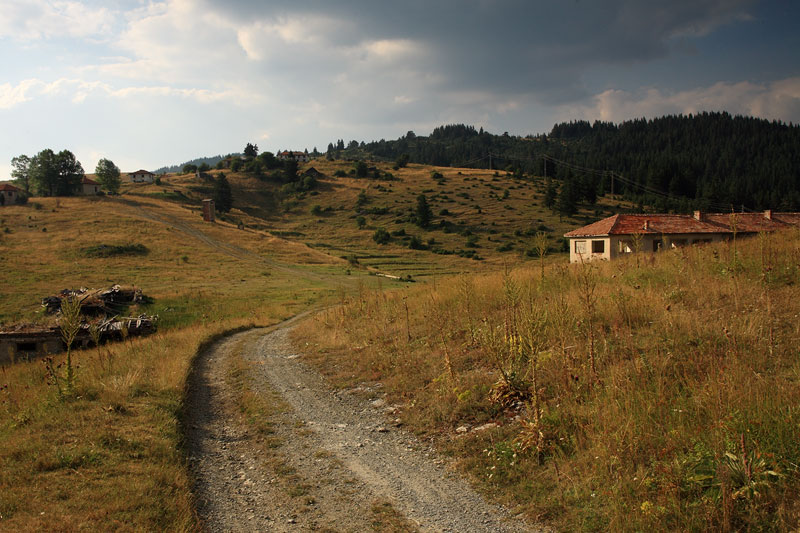
Village of Chamla

Chamla (Bulgarian: Чамла) is an abandoned village in the municipality of Smolyan, located in the Smolyan Province of southern Bulgaria. The village is located 150.9 km from Sofia.

== Geography ==
Chamla is formally the highest village in Bulgaria, even though it is abandoned—this is because the land, administratively speaking, is still considered a village, although there have not been people there for many years. It is located close to the village Mugla and a rock formation known as the Trigrad Gorge.

== History ==
From 1878 to 1886, Chamla was located in the so-called Tamrash Republic. In 1920, 87 people lived in the village, in 1946, 133, and in 1965, 162. It was entirely deserted in the 80s, but it has not been removed from the lists of several associations.

In 2004, the Frenchman Olivier Lieuk (?) attempted to become the only resident of the village, but stayed there for less than a year, living in primitive conditions. After him, Oscar Korea tried again at this task, but did not succeed.

== Past Events ==
In 2006, there was a project for the ‘village’ to hold a youth art festival, ‘Chamla Fest’. The project failed at the last minute and the location was changed.
