= Khudu Khel =

Coordinates: 34°12′N 72°30′E

Khudu Khel Tehsil تحصیل خدو خیل خدو خېل تحصیل
- Tehsil
- Interactive map of Khudu Khel Tehsil
- Country: Pakistan
- Province: Khyber Pakhtunkhwa
- District: Buner

Government
  - Chairman: Gulzar Hussain Babak (ANP)

Population (2017)
  - Total: 118,185
- Time zone: UTC+5 (PST)

KhuduKhel or Khudu Khel is a tehsil and Panjtar is its central town. Panjtar is located near district Swabi and also located in swat khwaza khela shalpin bawrai northwestern region of the country.

Totalai has a police station named Saheed Noor Wali Khan Police Station (which is named after Noor Wali Khan, who was killed by Taliban in 2008), hospital (THQ), private hospital named (Gohar Hospital & Trust Totalai Khudukhel) the Founder of this hospital is Surgeon Dr Gohar Ali khan Yousafzai s/o Siraj Muhammad Nishtar Budlakhel established on 13 August 2021 and inaugurated

1 January 2017, degree college for men, degree college for girls and many primary, middle, high, and secondary schools for boys and girls, Office of the Magistrate. Panjtar is an administrative unit of Tehsil Khudu Khel, known as Union council of Buner District in the Khyber Pakhtunkhwa province of Pakistan.

Panjtar is one of the most important towns of district Buner, gateway to Swat District and Buner previously known as princely state, the Yusafzai State of Swat via Swabi.

District Buner has 6 Tehsils; Daggar Chagharzai Chamla Khudu Khel Gagra and Gadezai. Each Tehsil is sub divided into Union councils. There are 5 union councils in KhuduKhel and 27 union councils in whole district Buner.

== History ==
Khadukhel have a very rich history and culture, it is a major centre of Gandhara civilisation. The most famous archaeological site is the Ranigat of the Nogram village surrounded by mountains.

== Health ==
Khudokhel tehsil has one civil hospital (Totalai), one basic heath unit (Bagh), and two dispensaries (Chinglai and ghazi kot).

== Colored Bazaars ==
Tehsil Khadukhel has 3 (three) main bazaars on main Swabi Ambela road, namely Totalai, Ghorghustu and Chinglai.

== See also ==
- Buner District
