= Gadezai =

Salarzai & Gadezai Tehsil تحصیل سلارزئي گدیزئی ګدېزي سلارزئي تحصیل
- Tehsil
- Country: Pakistan
- Province: Khyber Pakhtunkhwa
- District: Buner

Government
  - Chairman: Sher Alam Khan (PTI)
- Time zone: UTC+5 (PST)

Salarzai & Gadezai is an administrative subdivision (tehsil) and Union council of Buner District in the Khyber Pakhtunkhwa province of Pakistan.

Gadezai was formally established by the appointment of first Assistant Commissioner/Subdivision Magistrate Syed Hammad Haider PMS on 29 July 2020.

District Buner has six tehsils: Daggar, Chagharzai, Chamla, Khudu Khel, Gagra and Salrzai Gadezai. Each tehsil comprises certain union councils. Gadezai comprises union councils Abakhel and Malikhel.

Gadai/Gadezai (Yusufzai) was the son of Tajezai, fourth son of Illiyaszai, whose father (Illiyas Khan) was the son of Musazai, Musazai was the second son of Yusuf Khan also known as Yusufzai. The descendants of Gadai are called Gadaizai or Gadezai (Zai means Descendants ).

Gadai had five sons: Hassan Khel, Bahram Khel, Alisher Khel, Hussain Khel/Seen Khel, Ibrahim Khel. Descendants of the first four sons live in the villages of Sultanwas, Ghazikhany, Malakpur, Pacha, Bhai, Kalakhela, Balokhan, Battai, Narbatol, Dukada in Tehsil Gadezai, while the fifth son Ibrahim was separated from his father Gadezai in Kabul. The Descendants of Ibrahimkhel are known as Mughal Khel who are now living in the District Bannu. The main place of which is Ghoriwala.

The Salarzai Yusufzai Tribe (Brother tribe of Gadezai ). Salarzai (Salar Khan Baba) had 3 Sons: Ayubkhel, Malikhel, Manikhel. The Descendants of these Three Tribes are in Jowar, Baampoha, Bazargey, Kingargali, Naanser, Kaatkala, Charai, Leganrai and Koye. Malak Misri Khan Yusufzai (The 3rd Ruler of Pakhtunkhwa State and Yusufzai Tribe) was also from Salarzai Yusufzai Tribe.

== Notable people ==
- Malak Misri Khan Yusufzai – 3rd Ruler of Pakhtunkhawa State, and Chief of Yusufzai tribe.
- Muhammad Amir Khan Yusufzai – The Founder of Tonk State in Hindustan was from Jowar village of Salarzai sub-clan of Yusufzai of District Buner.
- Abdul Ghafur Muhammad Khan Yusufzai – The Ruler of Jaora State. His Paternal Ancestors were from Salarzai sub-clan of Ilyaszai of Musazai Yusufzai Tribe of District Buner.

== See also ==
- Buner District
