= Gagra =

Town in Abkhazia/Georgia

Gagra გაგრა (Georgian) Гагра (Abkhaz)
- Town
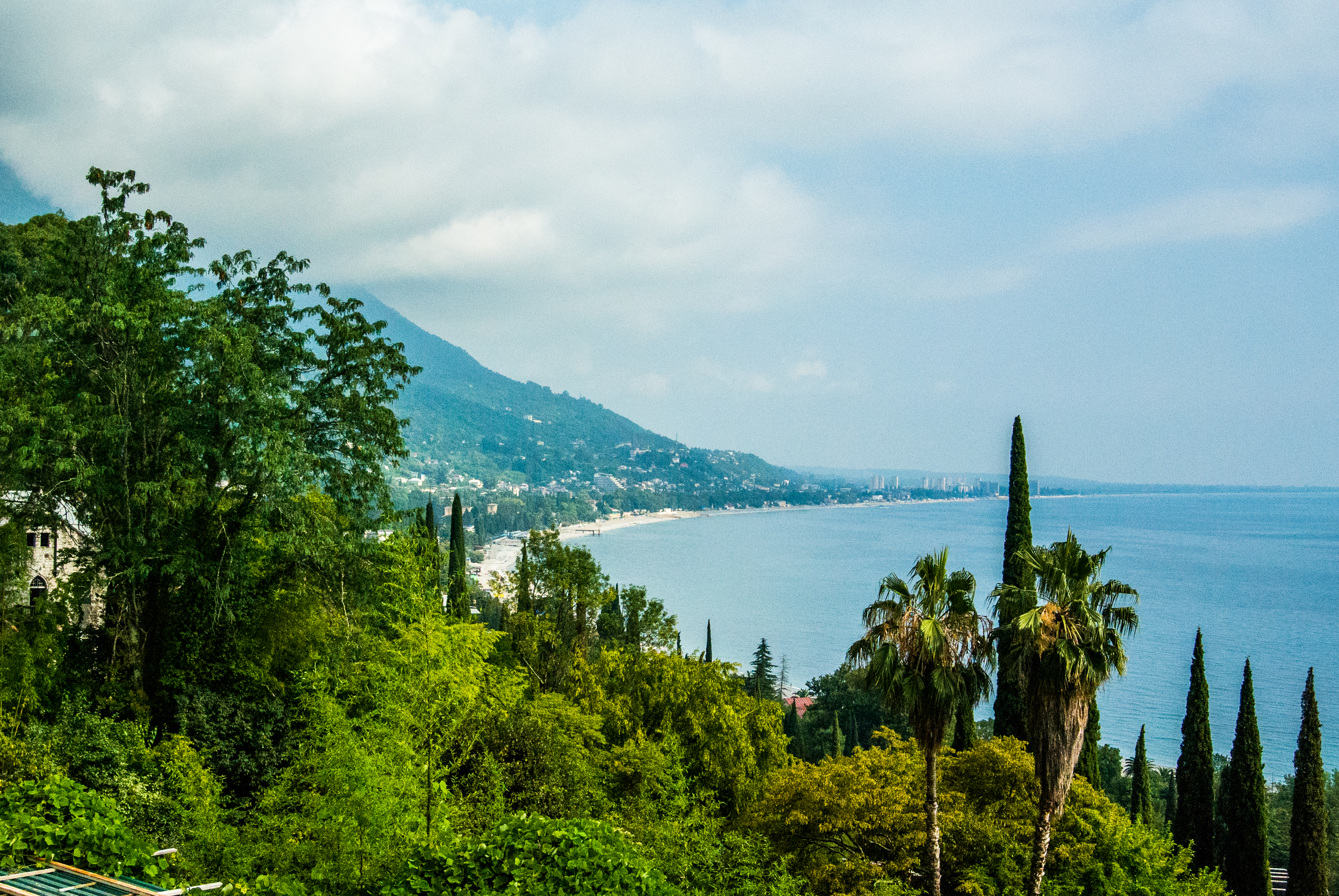
- Coastline of Gagra

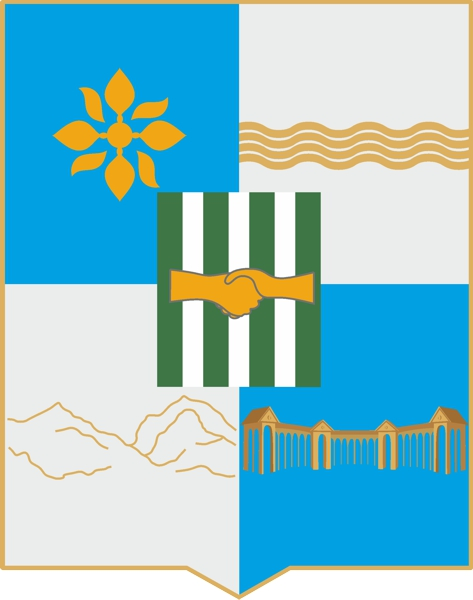
- Coat of arms

- Location of Gagra in Abkhazia

- Location of Gagra Gagra (Abkhazia)
- Coordinates: 43°17′N 40°16′E
- Country: Georgia
- Partially recognized independent country: Abkhazia
- District: Gagra

Government
  - Mayor (Note: The Governor of Gagra District is at the same time Mayor of the Gagra municipality.): Yuri Khagush

Population
  - Estimate (2018): 12,002
- Time zone: UTC+3
- Climate: Cfa

Gagra (Georgian: გაგრა; Abkhaz and Russian: Гагра) is a town in Abkhazia/Georgia, (Note: The political status of Abkhazia is disputed. Having unilaterally declared independence from Georgia in 1992, Abkhazia is formally recognised as an independent state by 4 UN member states (three other states previously recognised it but then withdrew their recognition), while the remainder of the international community recognizes it as de jure Georgian territory. Georgia continues to claim the area as its own territory, designating it as Russian-occupied territory.) sprawling for 5 km on the northeast coast of the Black Sea, at the foot of the Caucasus Mountains. Its subtropical climate made Gagra a popular health resort since the Imperial Russian times.

It had a population of 26,636 in 1989, but this has declined considerably as a result of ethnic cleansing of Georgians in Abkhazia and other demographic shifts during and after the War in Abkhazia (1992–93).

Gagra is the center of the district of the same name. It is located in the western part of the region of Abkhazia, and the Psou River serves as the border with the Krasnodar Krai of Russia.

== Etymology ==
According to a number of Georgian scholars, Gagra is derived from Gakra meaning "walnut" in the Svan language, while Gakari/Kakari means "a place with walnut trees", which is in accordance to toponym used in old maps. The name of the city is claimed by Z. Danelia to originate from the Gagaa family, who, according to Danelia, once lived there. However, the historicity of the Gagaa family and its connection to the city is disputed due to lack of evidence. According to V. Kvarchia, the name Gagra is derived from a combination of two Abkhaz words: a-ga ("coast") and a-kra ("to close"), that is, "a place where the shore is closed". According to Z. Anchabadze, etymology of the city is derived from "Gagrifshi." The term "Gak" or "Kak" is considered a personal name, while the affix "-ri" denotes possession. Additionally, the affix "-fsh-" is interpreted as indicating "the importance of the place."

== History ==
The town was established as a Greek colony in Colchis, called Triglite (Ancient Greek: Τριγλίτη). Colchis came under the control of the kingdom of Pontus in the 1st century BC before being absorbed by the Roman Empire, which renamed the town as Nitica. Its geographical position led the Romans to fortify the town, which was repeatedly attacked by Goths and other invaders. The town and the whole region of Colchis remained part of Byzantine Empire.

It was known to the Genoese merchants and the Gagra harbour might have been used by them. The name "Gagra" appeared for the first time on a map in 1308, on a map of the Caucasus made by the Italian Pietro Visconti, which is now in the Library of Saint Mark in Venice.

=== Gagra within the Russian Empire ===
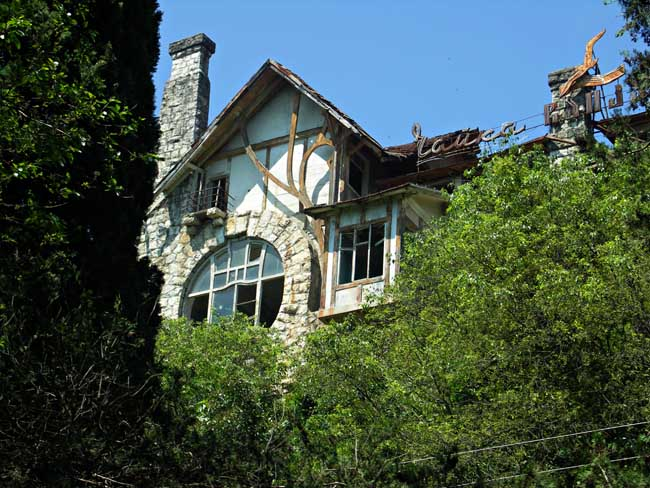
Palace of the Prince of Oldenburg

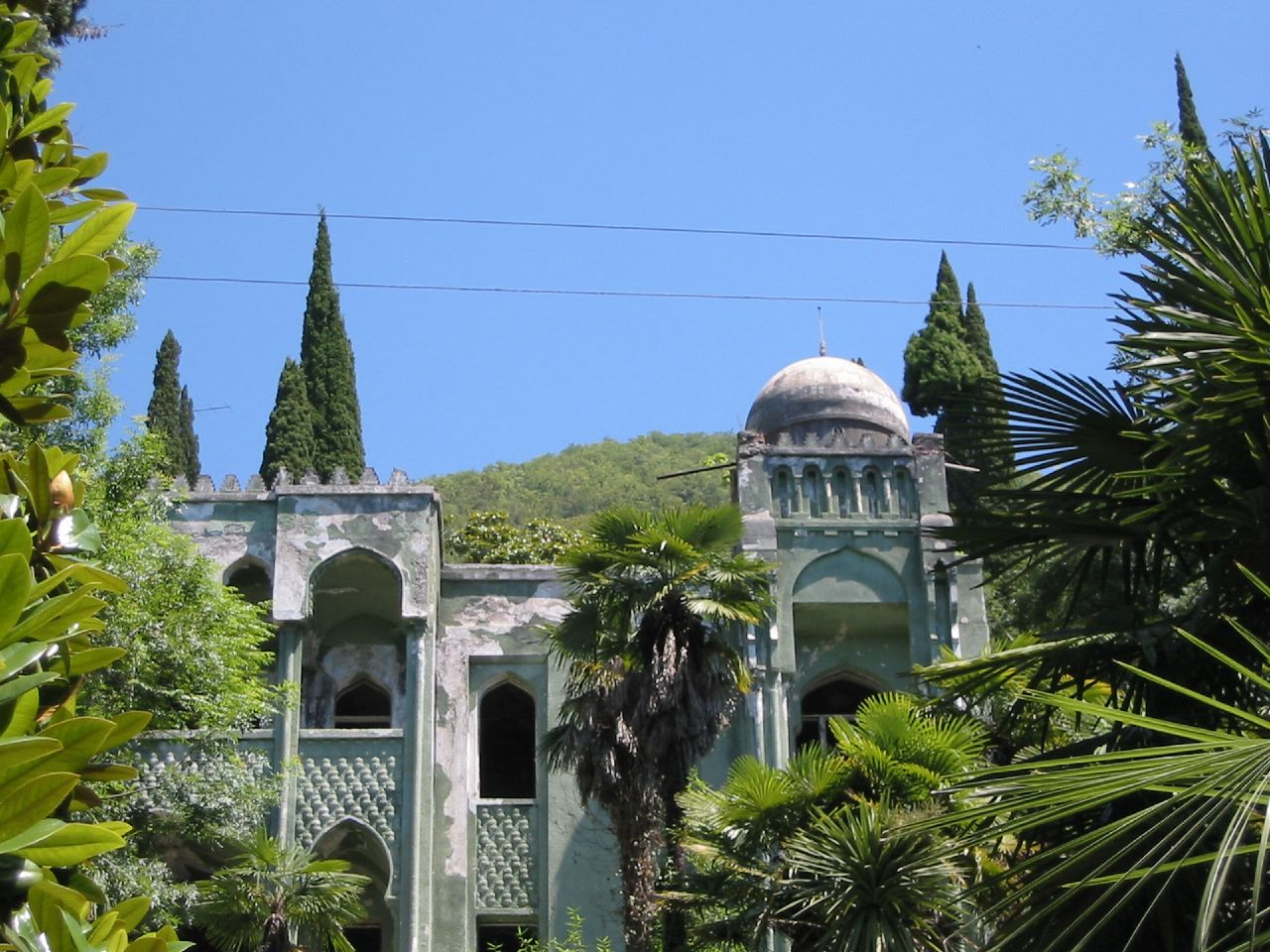
Old houses in Gagra

In the 16th century, Gagra and the rest of western Georgia were conquered by the Ottoman Empire. The western merchants were expelled and the town entered a prolonged period of decline, with much of the local population fleeing into the mountains. By the 18th century, the town had been reduced to little more than a village surrounded by forests and disease-ridden swamps.

Russia built a small fort in Gagra in 1833 which was destroyed during the Crimean War. The Sadz Abkhaz who inhabited the land between Gagra and the Khosta were expelled to the Ottoman Empire after fierce battles. The swamps around the town were drained and the town was rebuilt around a new military hospital. Its population, however, was still small; in 1866, a census recorded that 336 men and 280 women, mostly local families or army officers and their dependents, lived in Gagra. The town suffered badly in the Russo-Turkish War, 1877-1878, when Turkish troops invaded, destroyed the town and expelled the local population. Russia won the war, however, and rebuilt Gagra again.

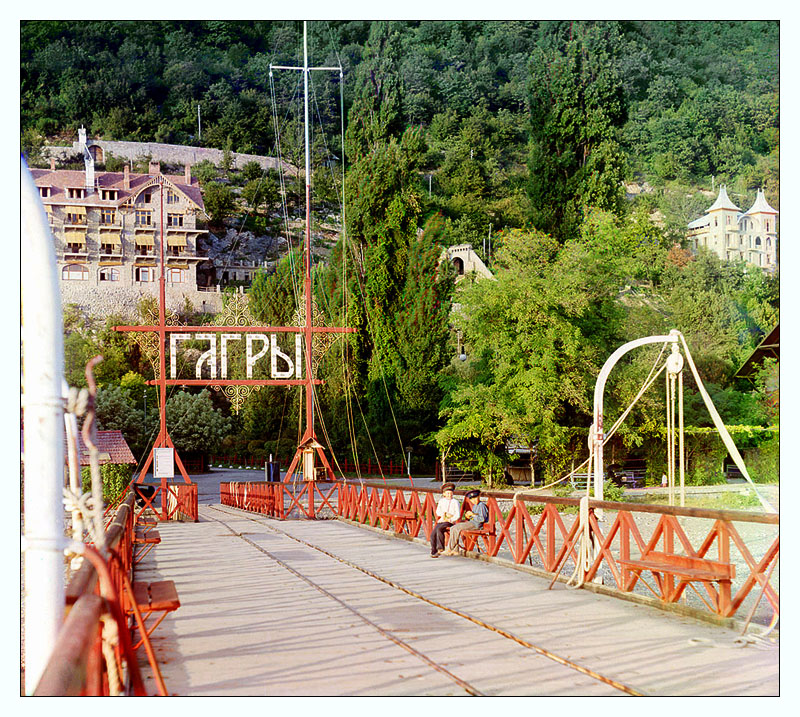
View of Gagra's wharf sometime between 1905 and 1915.

In 1904 the town was discovered by Duke Alexander of Oldenburg, a member of the Russian royalty. He saw the potential of the region's sub-tropical climate and decided to build a high-class resort there. Having raised a large sum of money from the government, he built a palace there for himself and constructed a number of other buildings in an eclectic variety of architectural styles from around Europe. A park was laid out with tropical trees, and parrots and monkeys were imported to give it an exotic feel. Despite the expensive work, the resort was not initially a success, although it did later attract a growing number of foreign tourists visiting on cruises of the Black Sea. Following the founding of the resort, the area was ceded from Sukhumi Okrug to Black Sea Governorate in 1904.

In the Russian Revolution of 1905, a local uprising produced a revolutionary government in the town, which founded a short-lived Republic of Gagra. This was soon defeated and the revolutionaries were arrested en masse. The First World War a few years later was a disaster for Gagra, destroying the tourist trade on which it depended. The Russian Revolution shortly afterwards saw the Bolsheviks take over the town; despite a brief French attempt to repel them during the Russian Civil War, the town was firmly incorporated into the new Soviet Union within Georgian SSR.

=== Gagra under the Soviet Union ===
Bolshevik leader Vladimir Lenin issued a decree in 1919 establishing a "worker's resort" in Gagra, nationalising the resort that had been built by Oldenburg. It became a popular holiday resort for Soviet citizens and during World War II gained a new role as a site for the rehabilitation of wounded soldiers. After the war, various state-run sanatoriums were built there. The resort grew and was developed intensively as part of the "Soviet Riviera". A 1985 musical film Winter Evening in Gagra further popularized the resort.

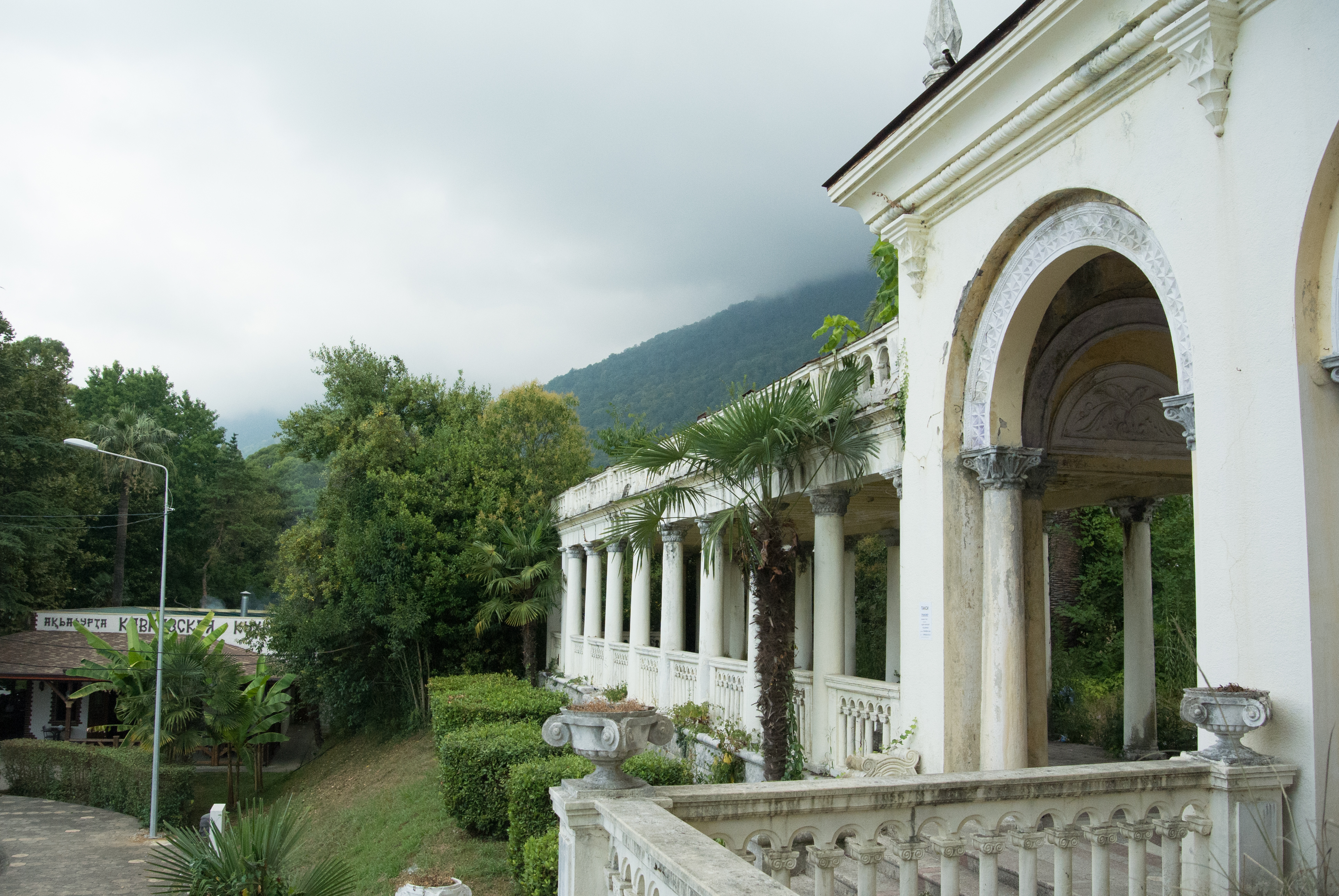
Abandoned buildings are common in Old Gagra

=== Gagra in post-soviet Abkhazia ===
In the late 1980s, tensions grew between the Georgian and Abkhazian communities in the region. An all-out war erupted between 1992 and 1993 which ended in a defeat of the Georgian government's forces. Hundreds of thousands of ethnic Georgians were expelled from their homes in Abkhazia and thousands were massacred in an outbreak of mass ethnic cleansing. Gagra and the Abkhazian capital Sukhumi were at the centre of the fighting and suffered heavy damage. To this date ethnic Georgians have an IDP status and have not been able to return to their homes.

== Monuments ==
The main sights of Gagra are:

- Ruins of the Abaata Fortress (4th–5th AD)
- A 6th-century Church of Gagra
- Marlinsky defensive tower (1841)
- 19th-century palace of the Prince of Oldenburg

== Gallery ==
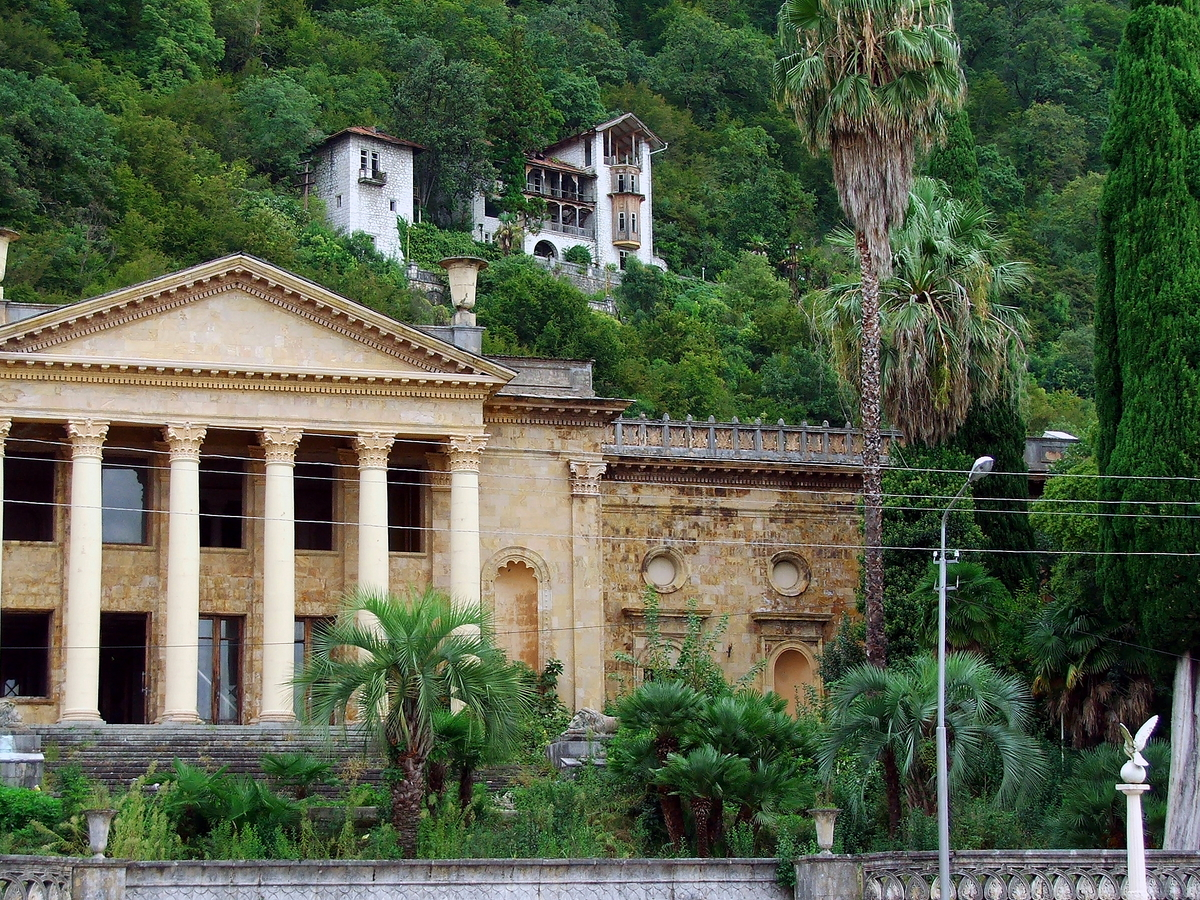
House of Culture in Gagra

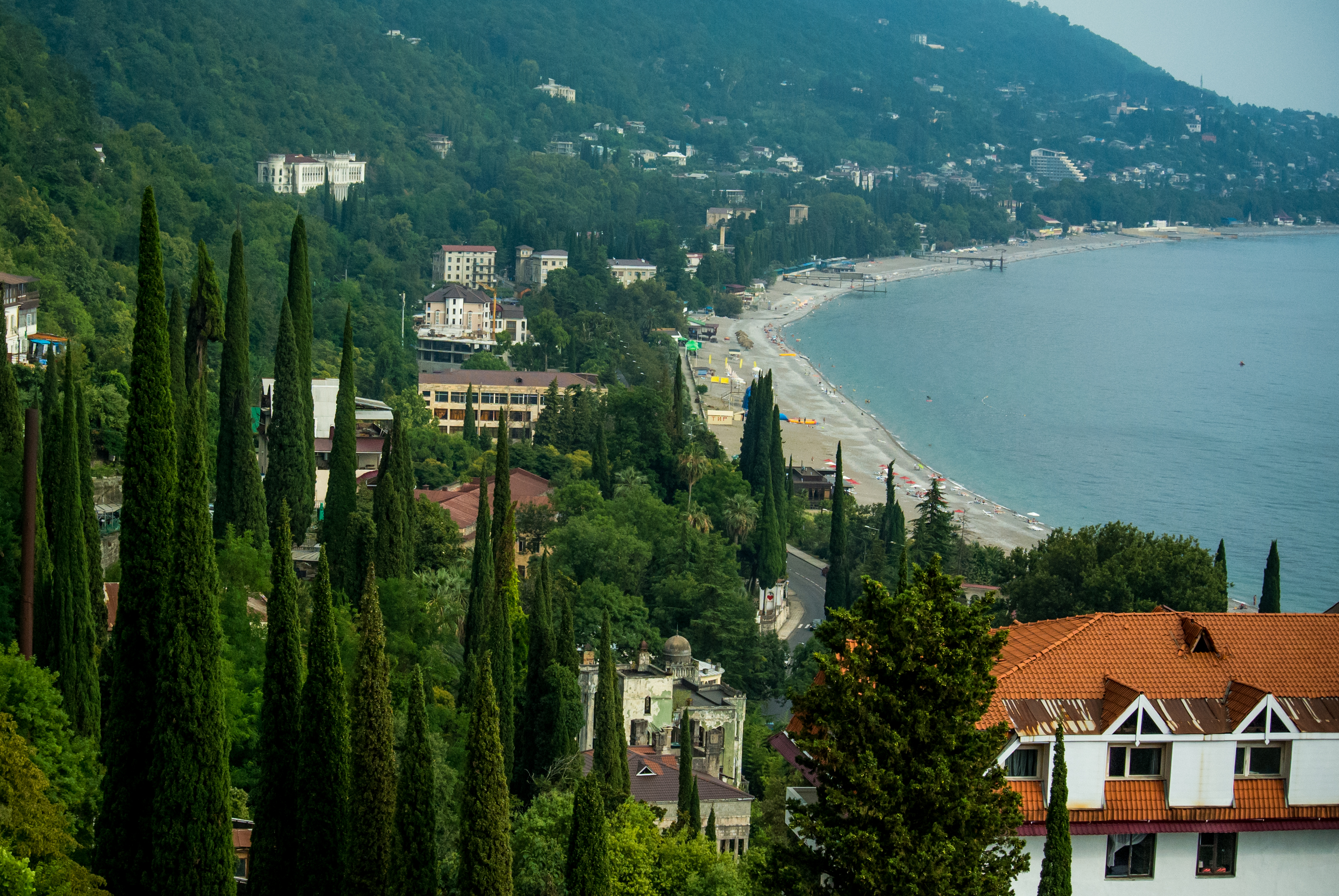
Coastline of Gagra

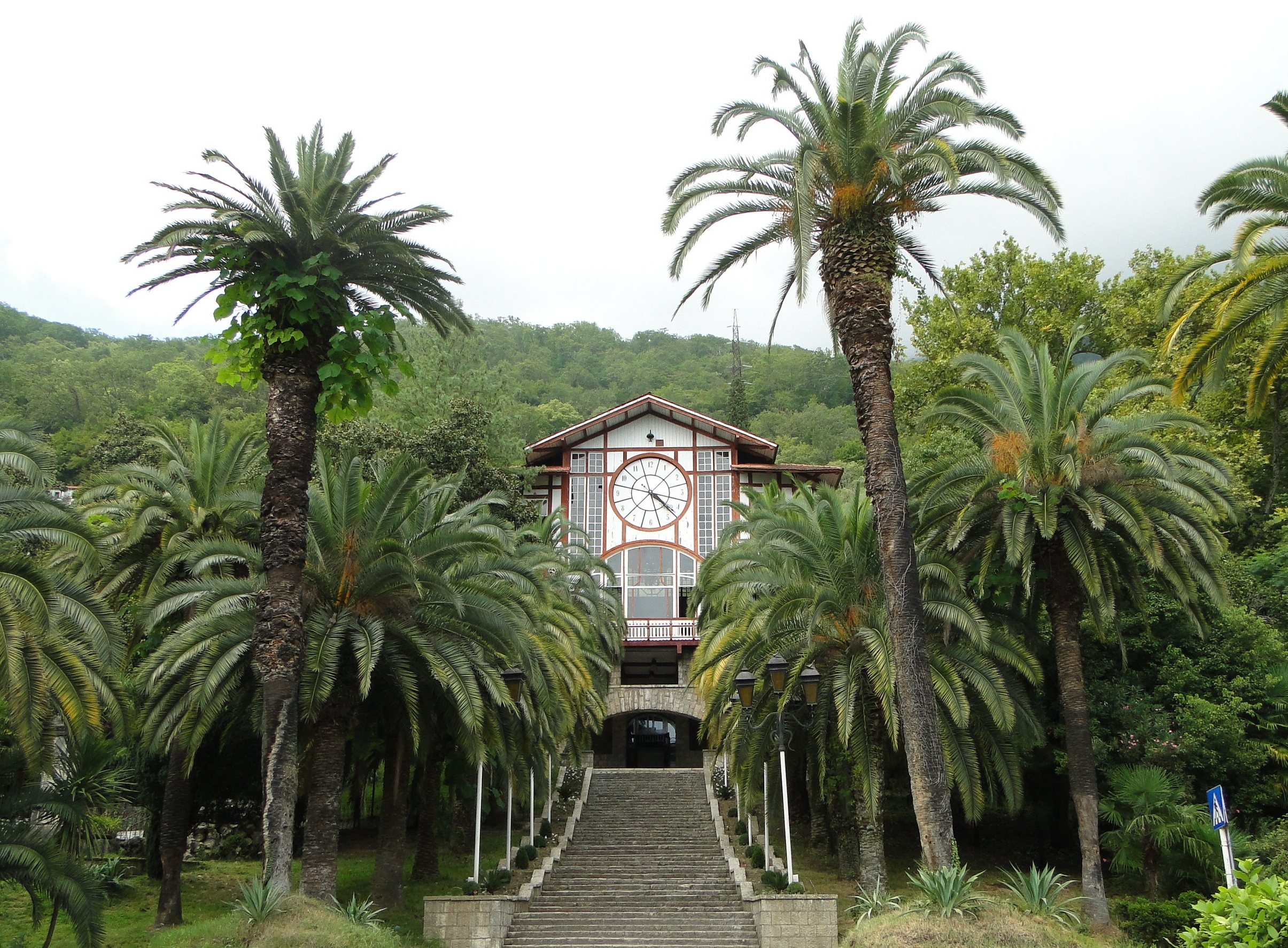
Gagra Restaurant "Gagripsh"

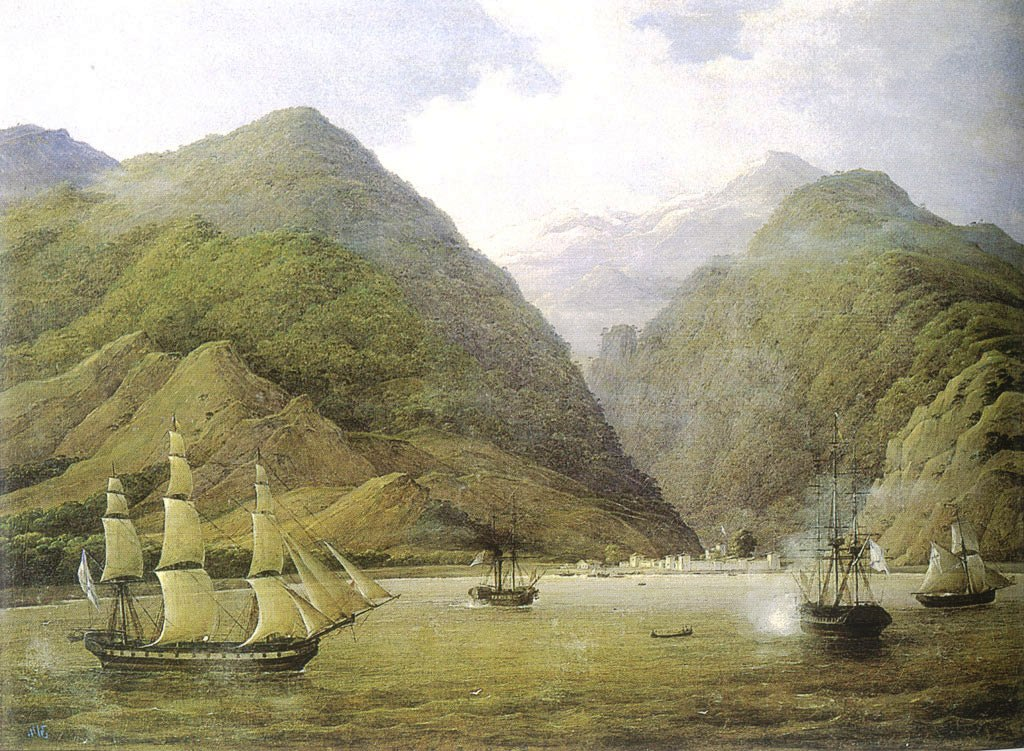
Gagra Fortress (1879) painting by Nikanor Chernetsov

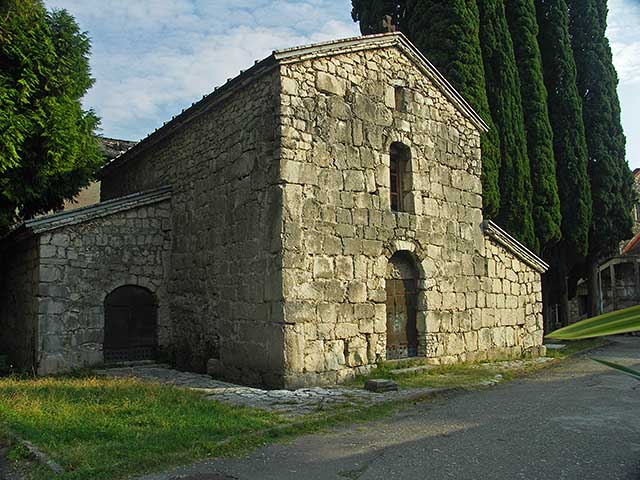
An early medieval church of the Protection of the Virgin

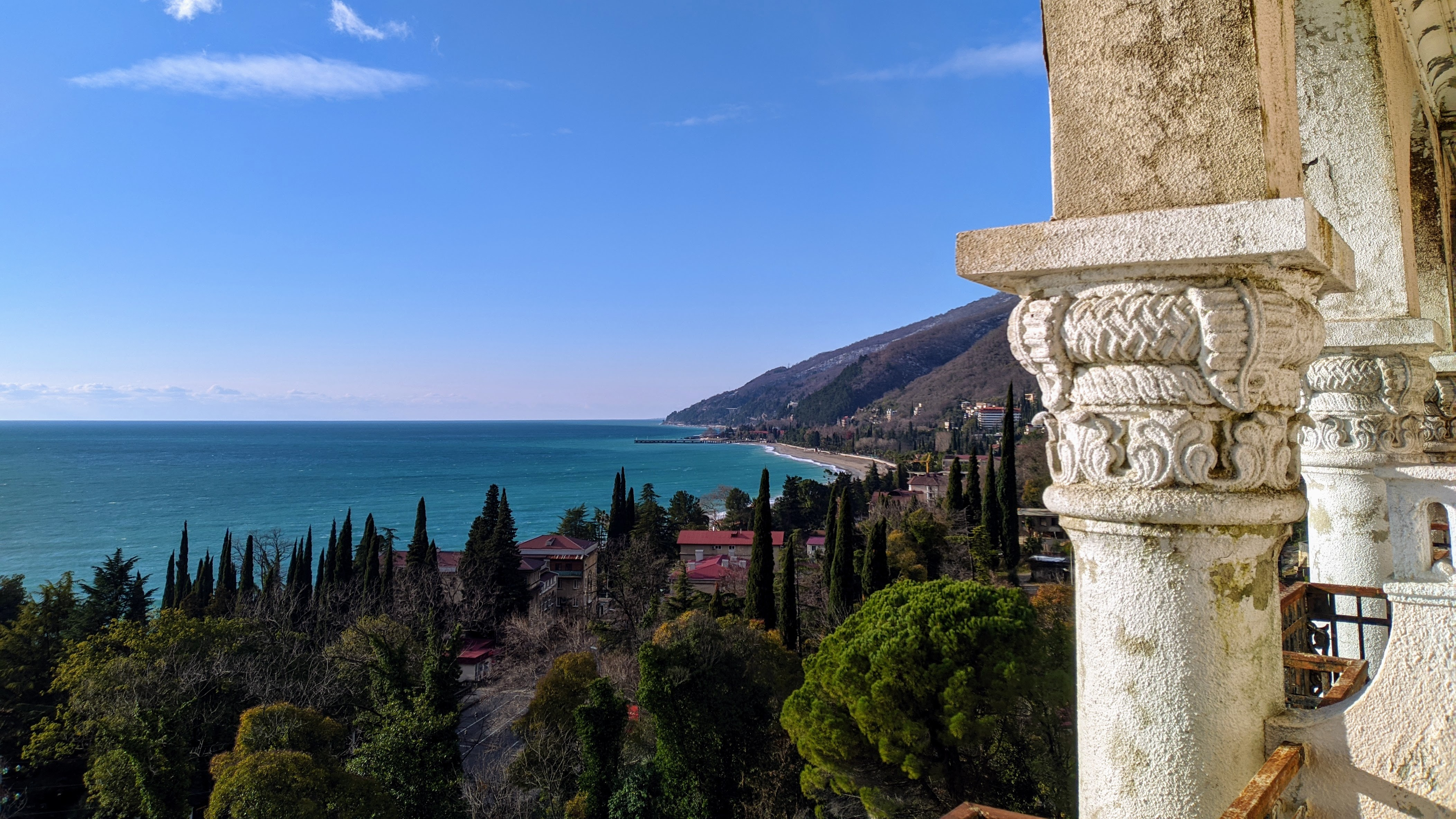
View on the Black sea in Old Gagra

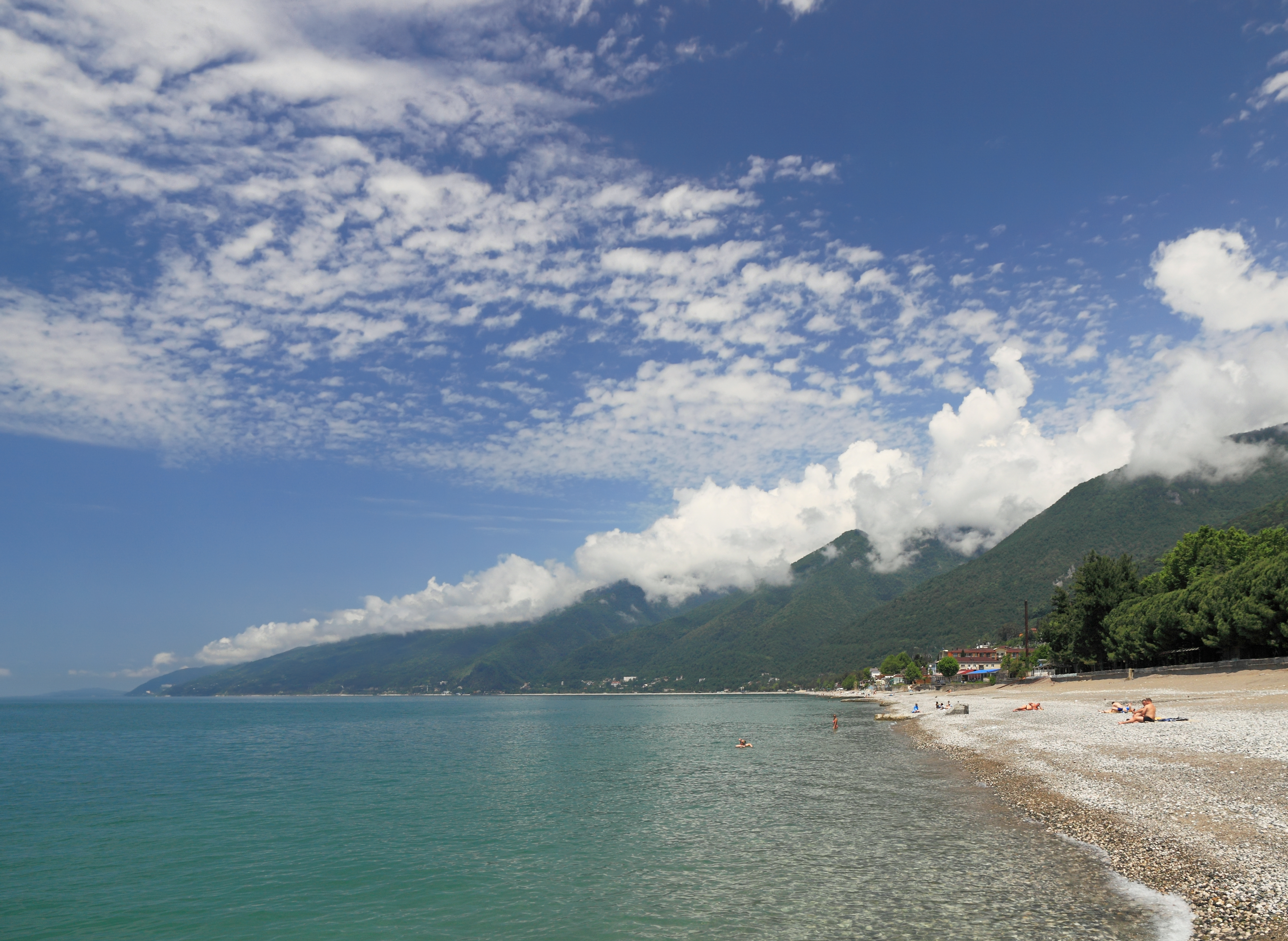
Beach in Gagra

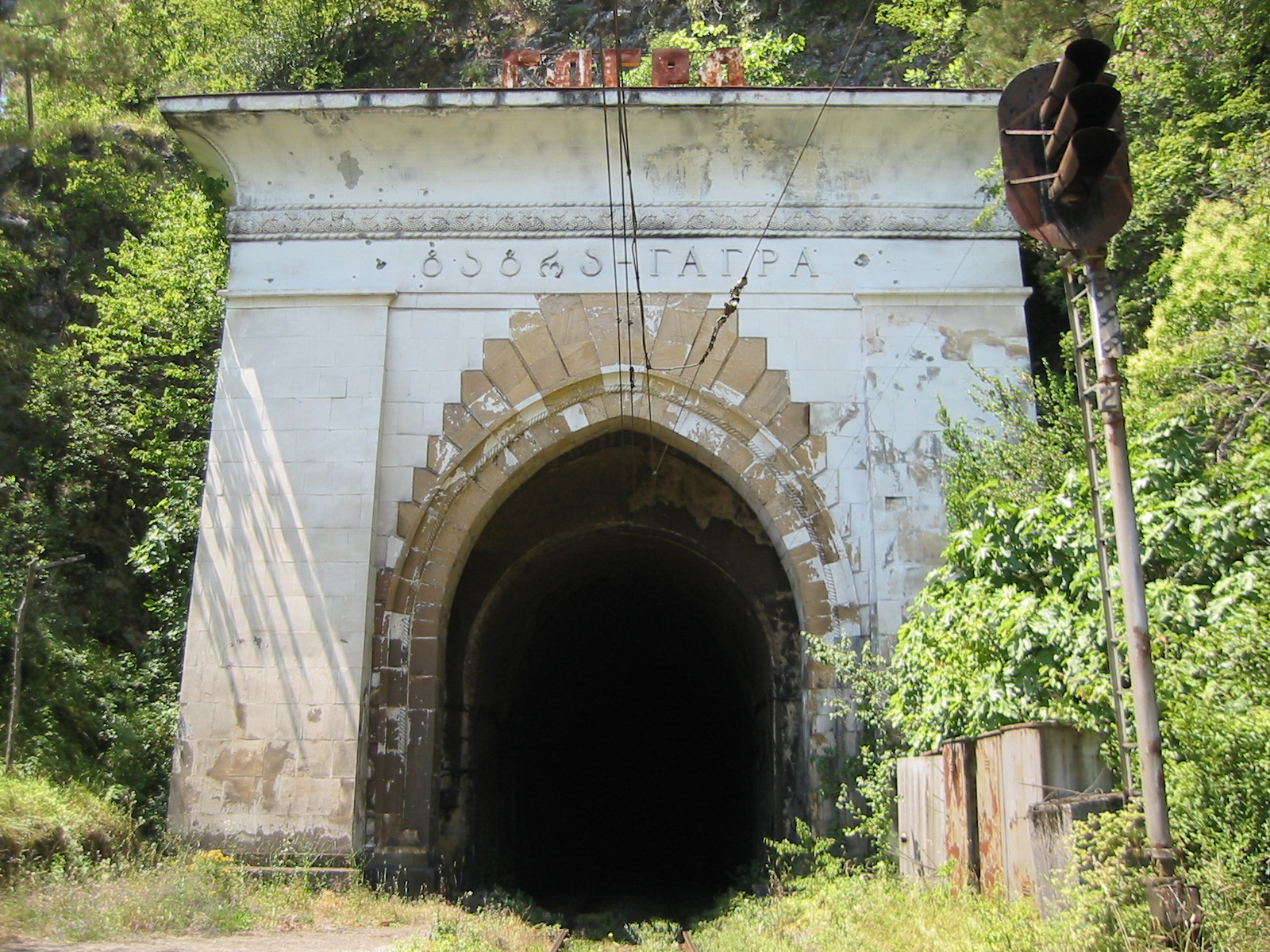
Gagra train tunnel

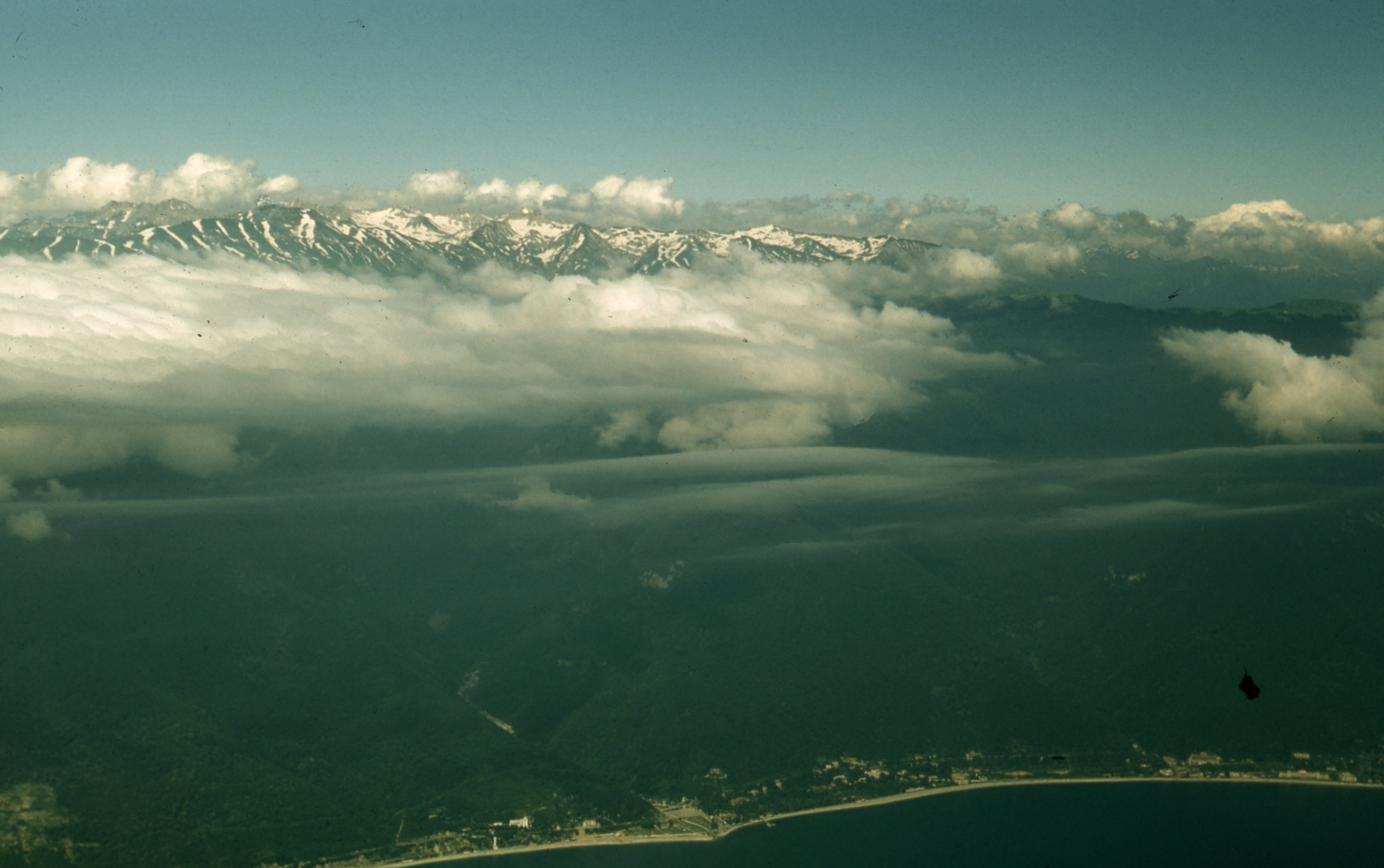
View from an aircraft in 1958. North side of Gagra, with the Abaata station and Zhoekvar river valley in the center. The city of Gagra itself is to the right.

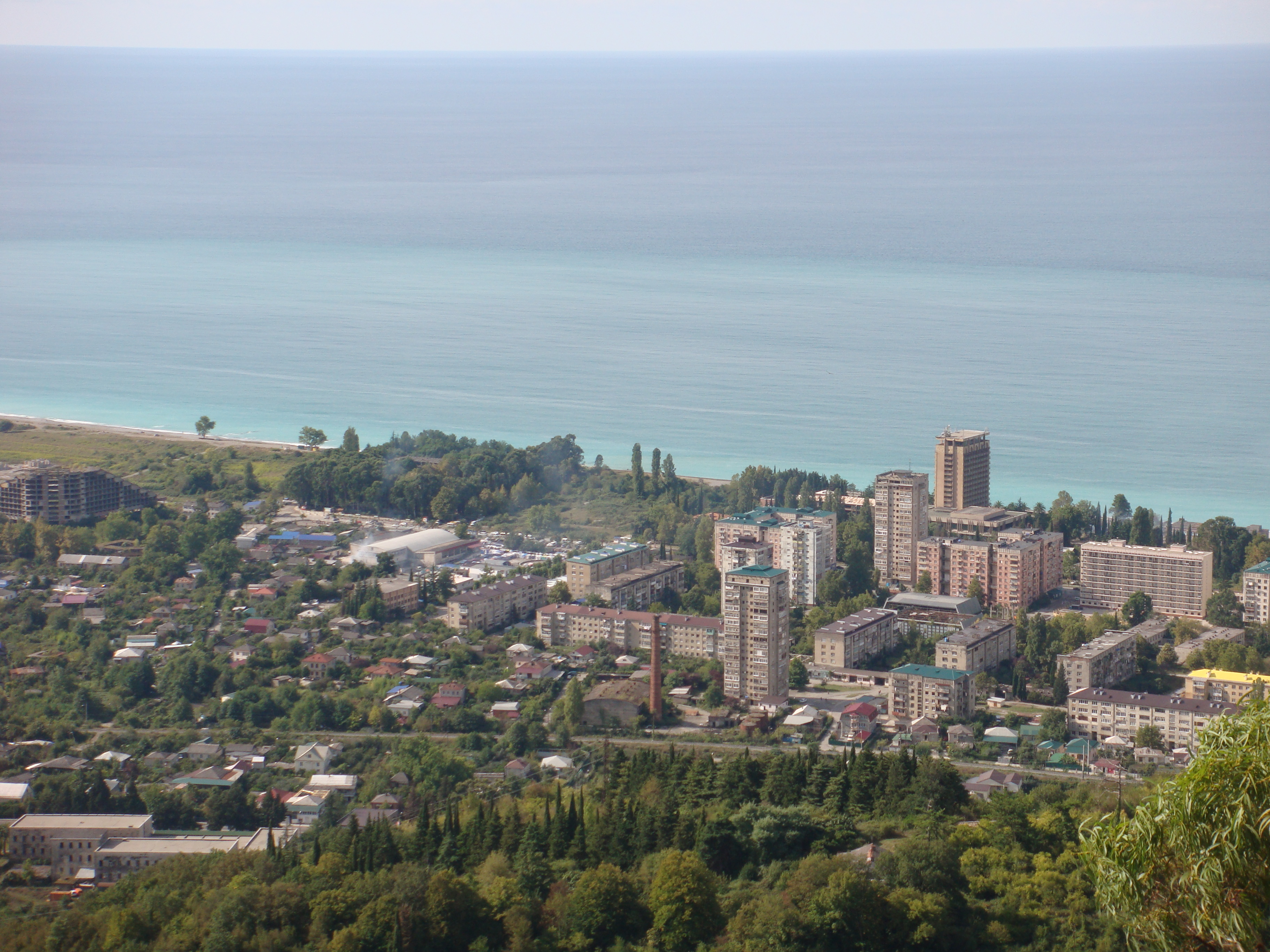
Apartment buildings of New Gagra

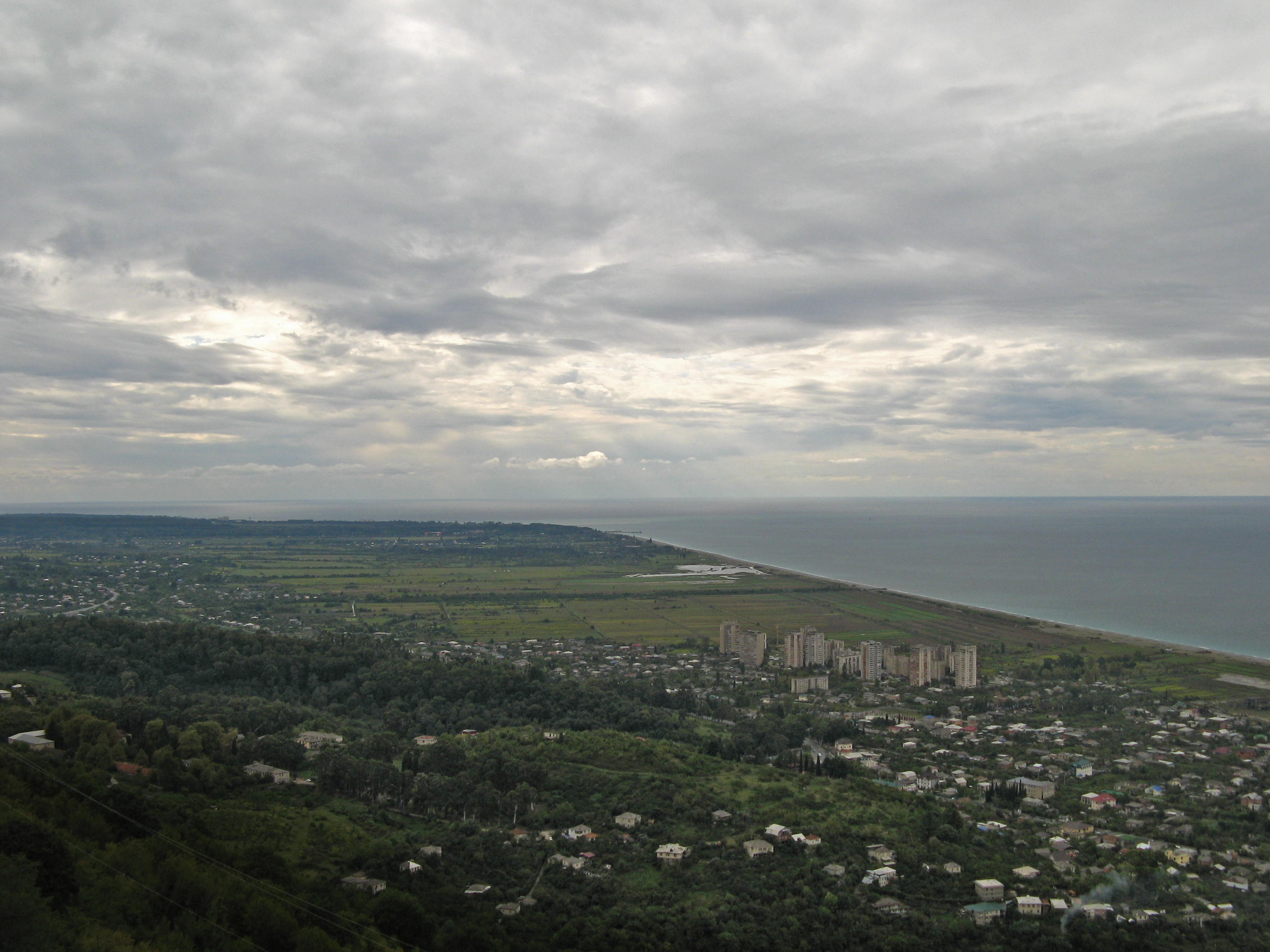
New Gagra aerial view

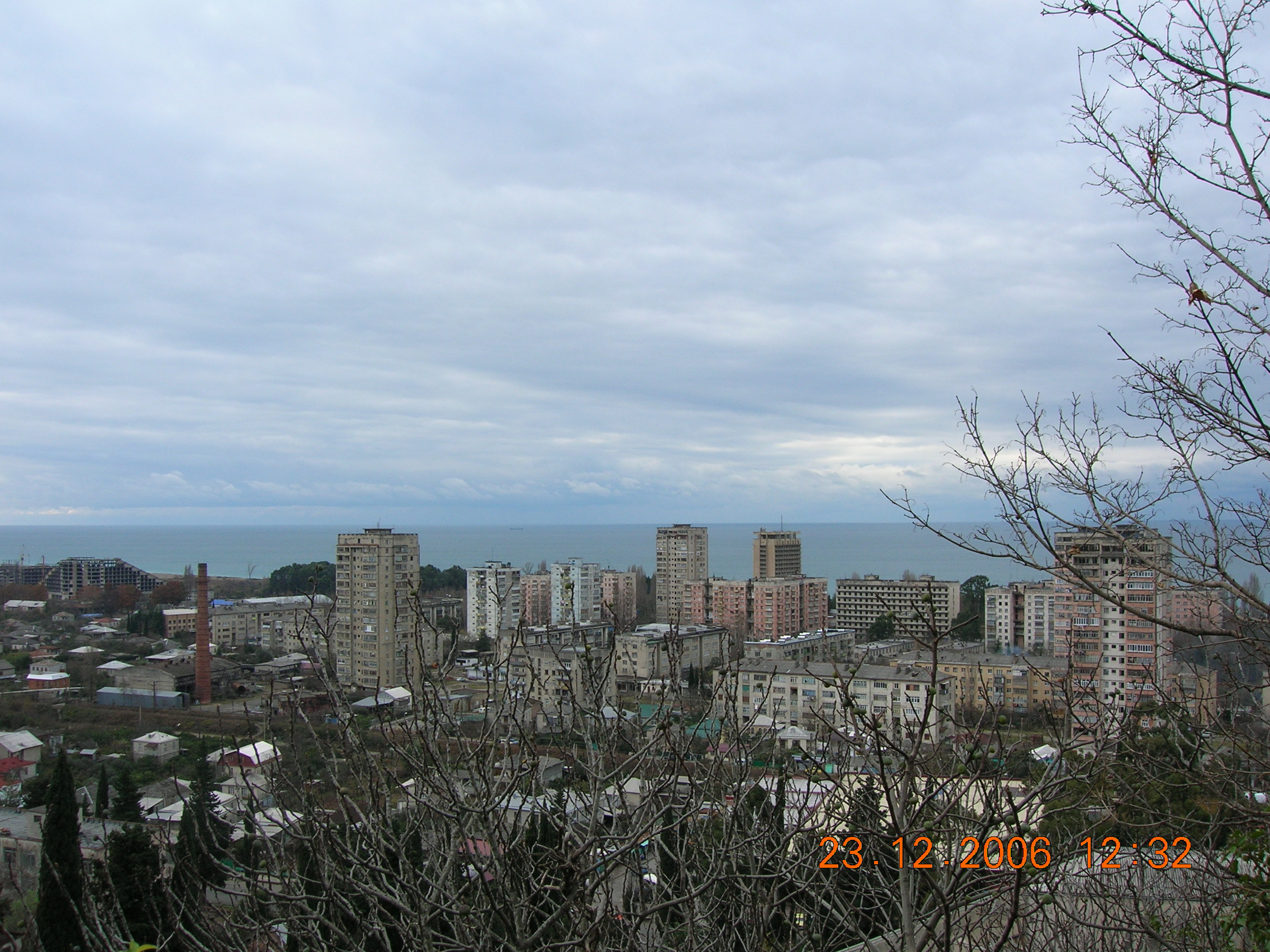
New Gagra in wintertime

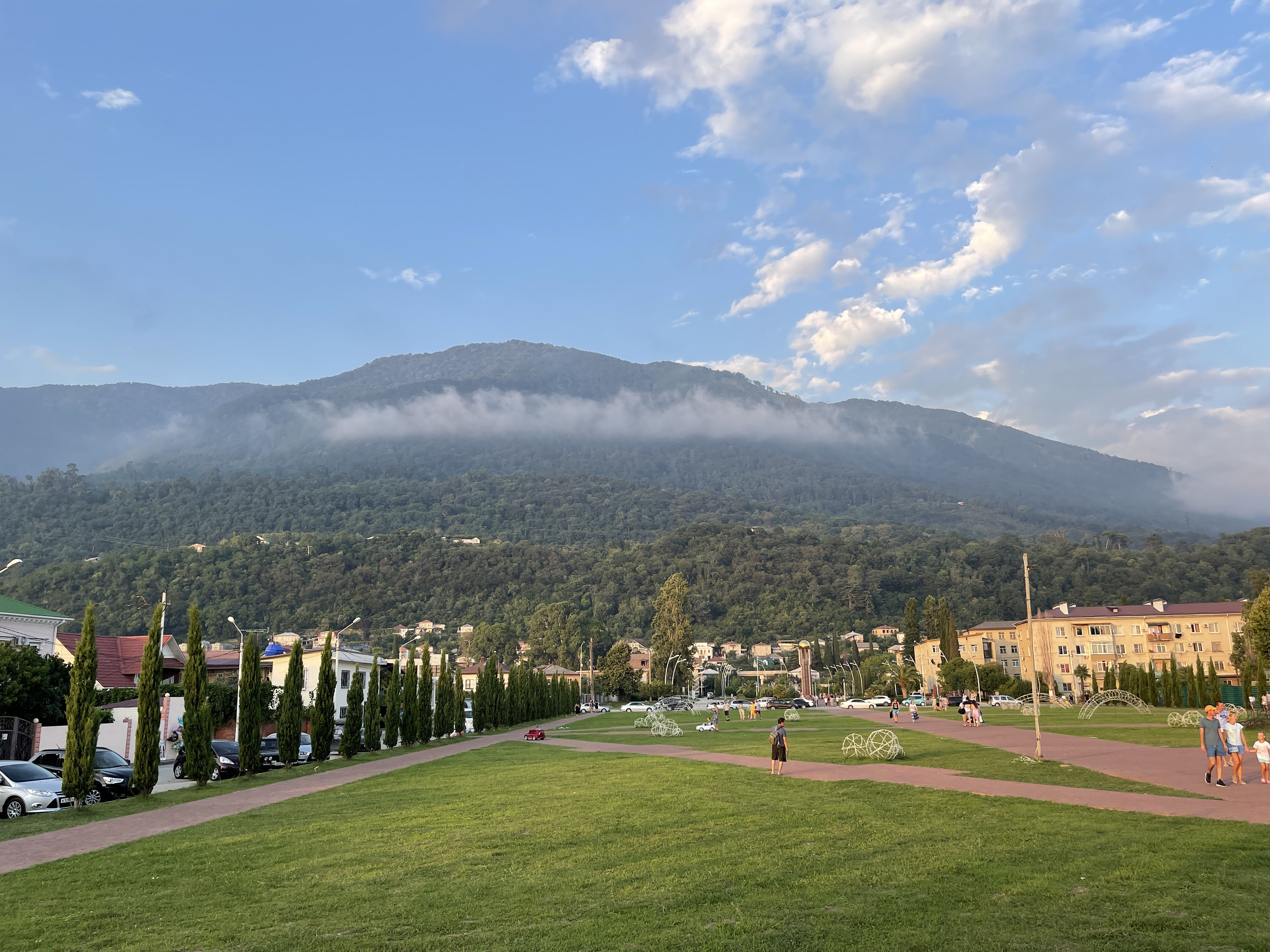
Streets in Gagra

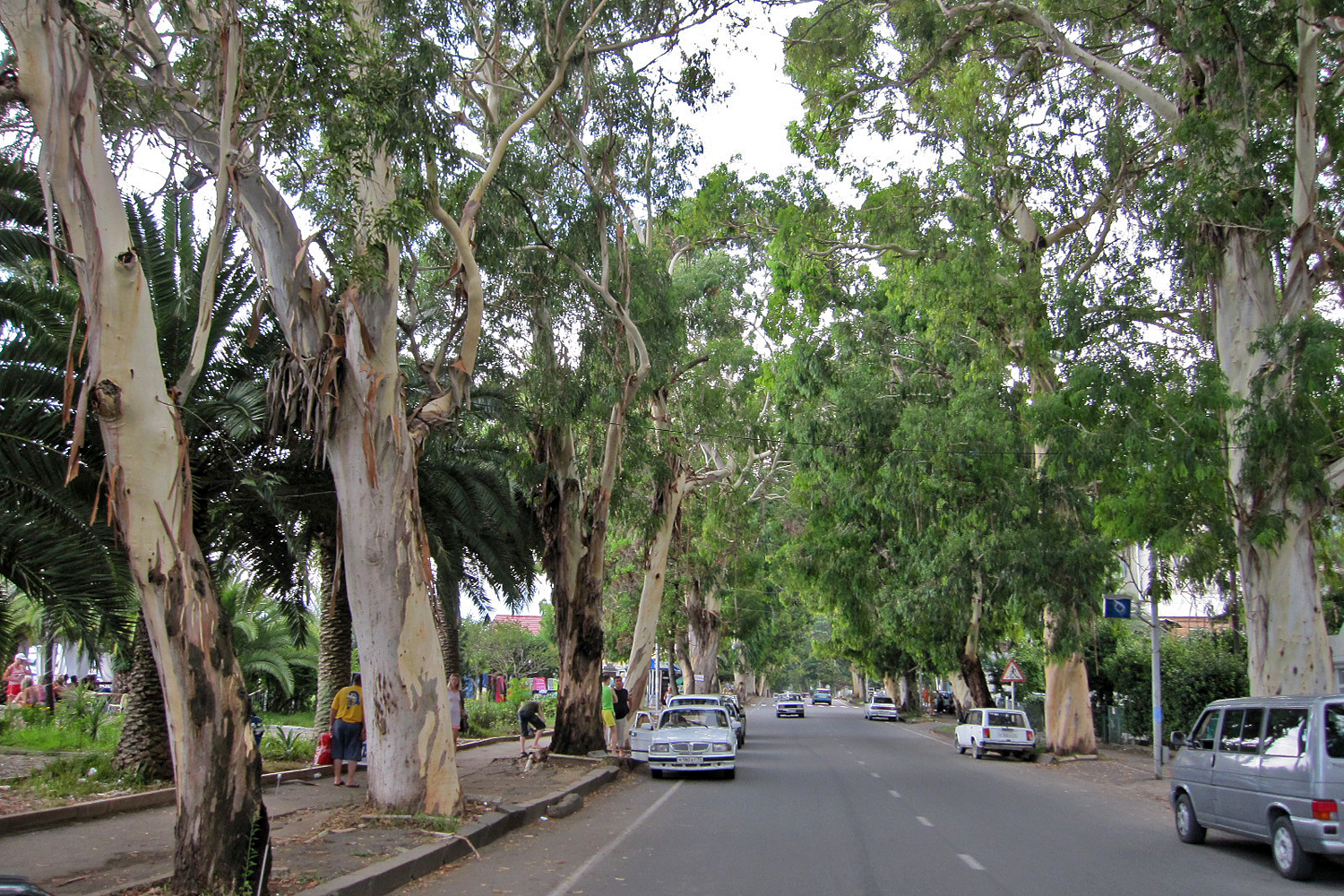
Avenue in Gagra

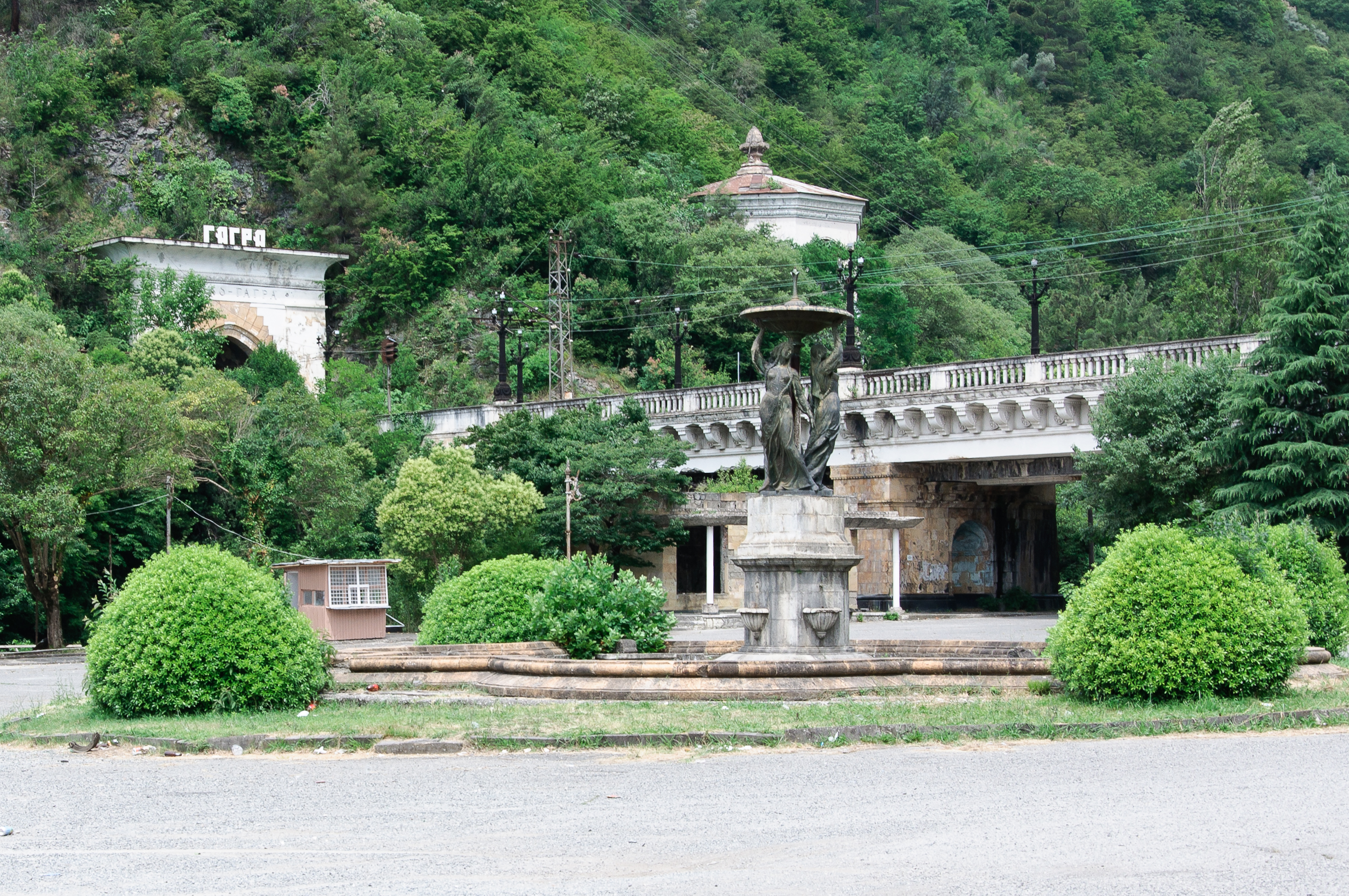
Nartaa square, Gagra

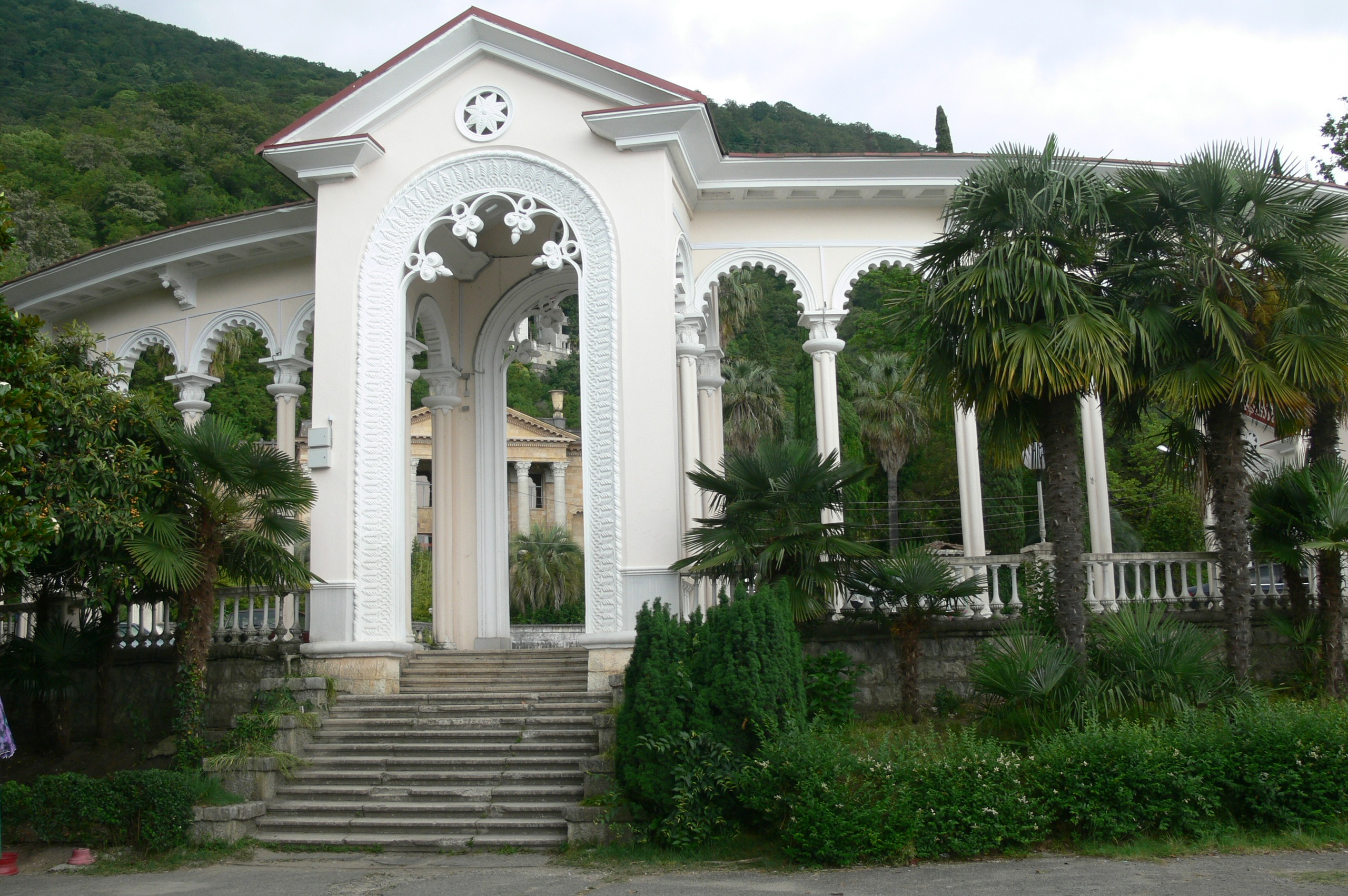
Colonnade in Primorsky Park

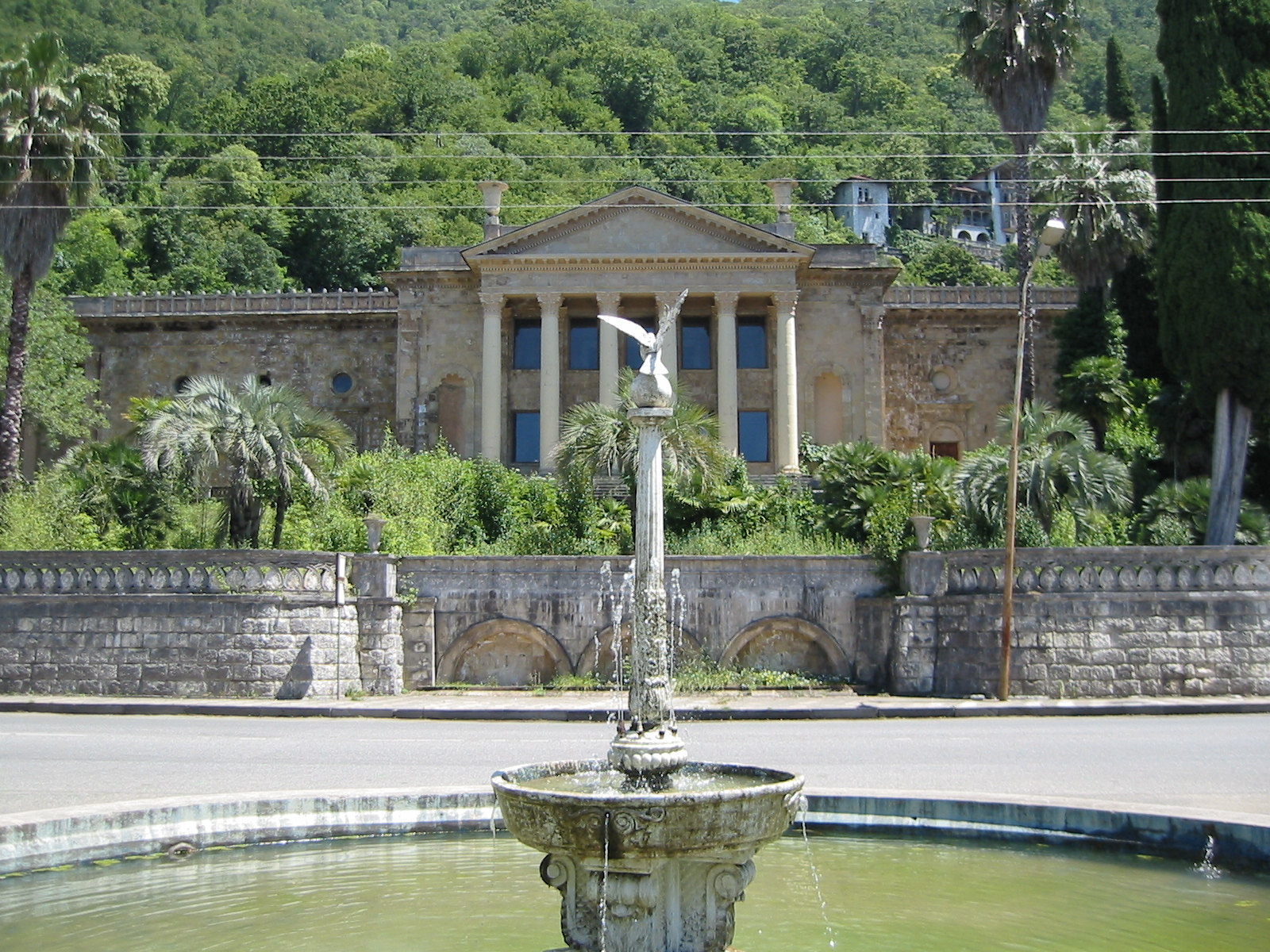
Winter Theater

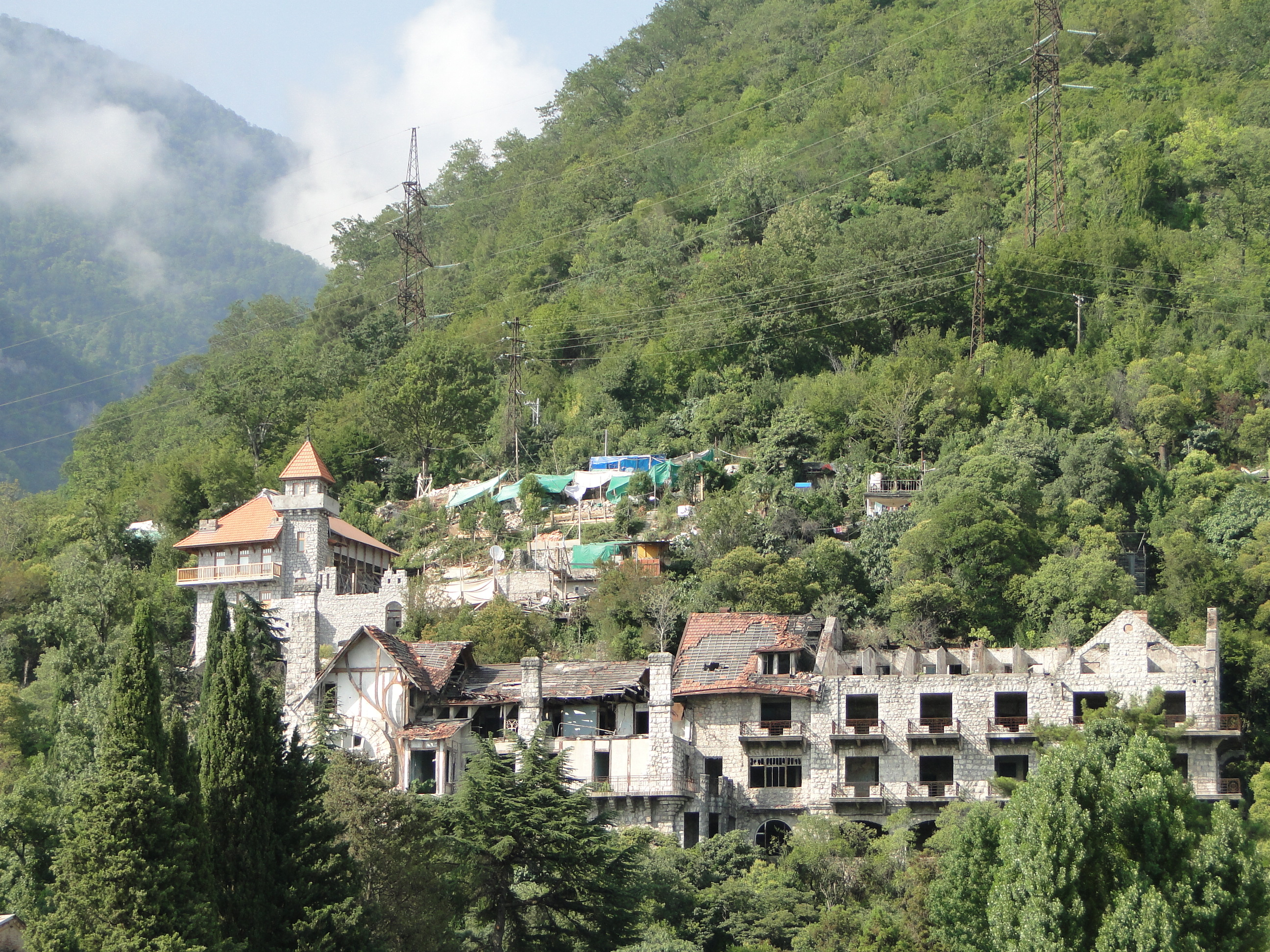
19th-century palace of the Prince of Oldenburg (at restoration)

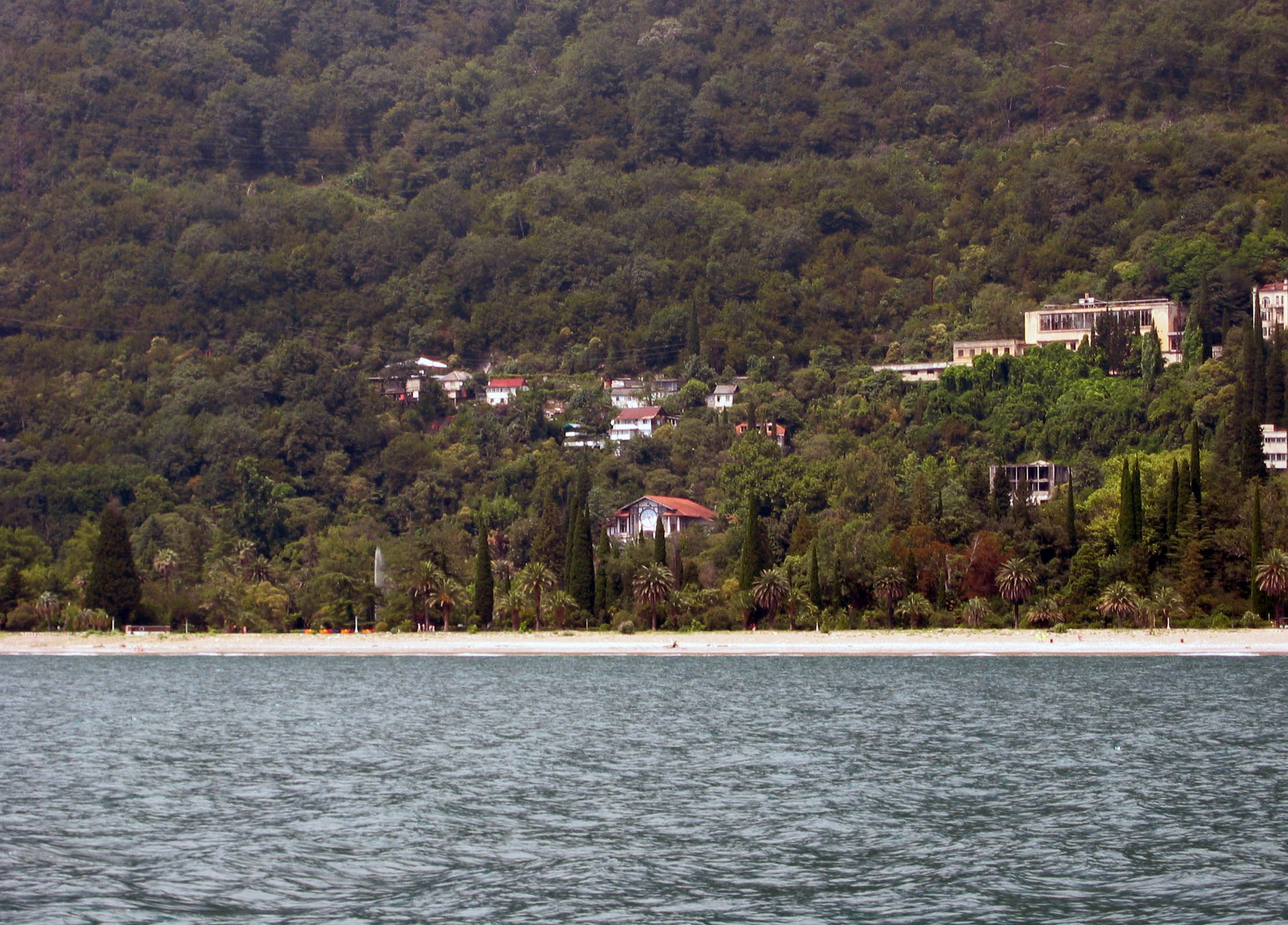
View from the Black Sea on Gagra

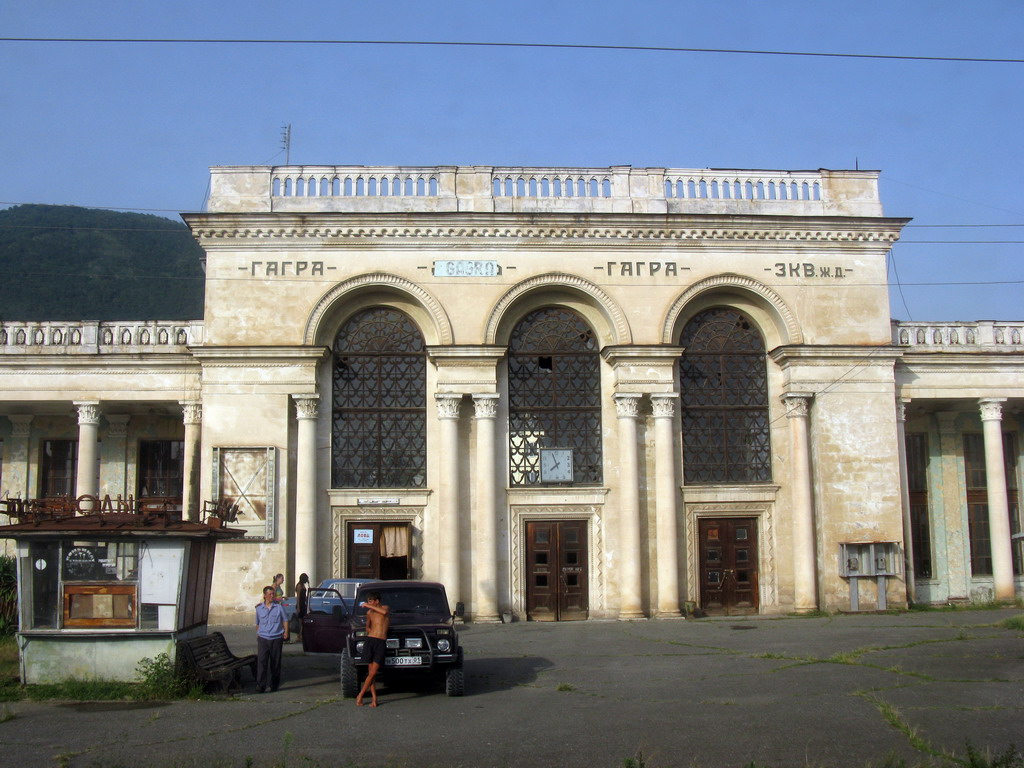
The building of the Gagra railway station

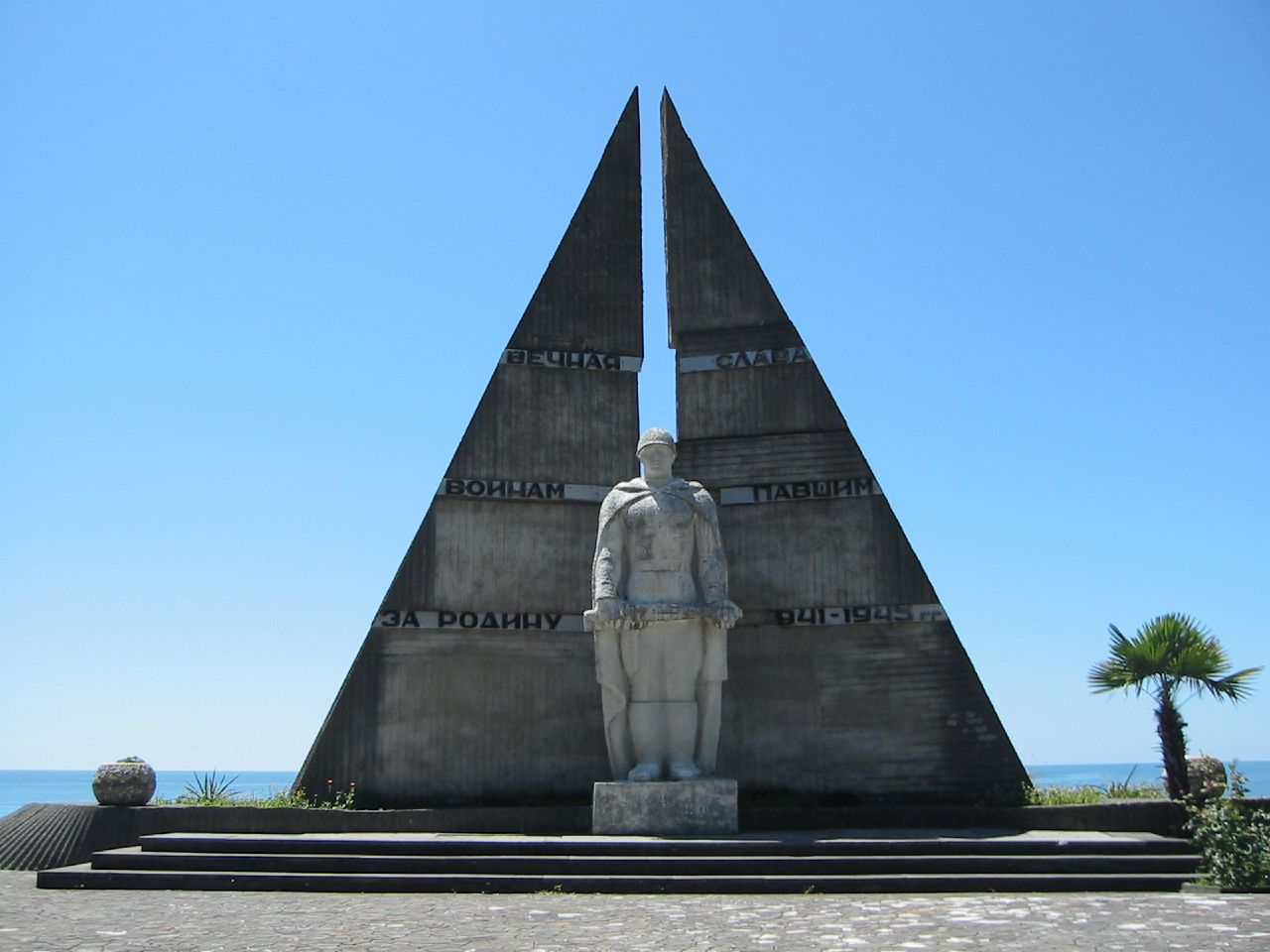
Monument to the dead in the Great Patriotic War

== See also ==
- Gagra District
- Sochi conflict
