= Chagharzai =

Yusufzai Pashtun tribe

Chagharzais (Pashto:چغرزي) or Chagarzais are a Pashtun tribe. They are considered to be a tribe among The Black Mountain (Tor Ghar) Tribes. Ghagharzai is a division of the Malayzai clan of the Yousafzai tribe. The Yousafzai tribe is widely recognized as one of the largest, most important and powerful of the Pashtun tribes. Military historian Colonel Harold Carmichael Wylly offers a personal perspective on the vast Yousafzai tribe, stating:

"The Yousafzai is an agriculturist, generally a fine, well-limbed man of a good physique and appearance with great deal of race-pride, well dressed and cheery, while his hospitality is proverbial".

== Origin ==
Chagharzais are the descendants of Ghaghar the son of Malay (Malayzai), and the grandson of Yusuf/Yousaf/Yousafzai.. They are divided into following sub-divisions:

== Sections and sub-sections (Khels) ==
The three Chagarzai sub-divisions are further divided into following Sections and Sub-sections:

| Sub Clan | Section | Sub-section (Khel) |
| Chagharzai | Ferozai | Bai Khel, Juna Khel, Maki Khel |
| | Basi Khel | Daud Khel, Shahu Khel, Khwaja Khel, Kalandar Khel, Kasan Khel and Babujan Khel. |
| | Nasrat Khel | Hanju Khel, Haider Khel, Lukman Khel and Badha Khel |

== Demographics ==
The Chagharzais occupy the country on either side of the Indus River. They are located on the western slopes of Tor Ghar (Black Mountain), to the north of the Akazais. The southern boundary of the Chagarzais is contiguous with that of the Akazais. It follows the spur of the Tor Ghar running from the Machai Sar (peak) to the Indus bank — the southern face of the spur belonging to the Akazais and the northern to the Chagarzais. On the west and north the Indus forms the boundary, while on the east the Chagarzais are bounded by the territory of the Deshiwals and of the Pariari Saiyids.

== Culture and traditions ==
Chagharzais have maintained their cultural identity and individuality. They lead their lives strictly in accordance with code of ethics of Pashtunwali which comprises Manliness, Goodness, Gallantry, Loyalty and Modesty. Chagharzais maintain the Pashtun customs of Jirga (consultative assembly), Nanawati (delegation pleading guilty), Hujhra (large drawing room) and Melmastya (hospitality).

== Creation of Tor Ghar District ==
On 28 January 2011, Tor Ghar became the 25th District of Khyber Pakhtunkhwa. Judba is the Headquarters of this district. The three tehsils (subdivision) of this district are; Judba, Kandar Hassanzai and Mada Khel. Most of the Chagharzai areas come under Judba Tehsil.

== See also ==
- Chagharzai, Buner
