= Daggar, Pakistan =

Town in Buner District, Khyber Pakhtunkhwa, Pakistan

Daggar ڈگر ډاګر
- Location within Khyber Pakhtunkhwa Location within Pakistan
- Coordinates: 34.30°N 72.29°E
- Country: Pakistan
- Province: Khyber Pakhtunkhwa
- Elevation: 688 m (2,257 ft)

Population (2017 Pakistani census)
  - Total: 20,217
- Time zone: UTC+5 (PST)

Daggar (Pashto: ډاګر, Urdu: ڈگر) or Dagar is a town and the district headquarters of Buner District in the Khyber-Pakhtunkhwa province of Pakistan.

It is located at 34°30′41″N 72°29′02″E and has an average elevation of 688 metres (2260 feet).

Daggar town is also an administrative unit (Union council) of Buner District with a population of 20,217 people and 1923 households per 2017 Pakistani census.

== Taliban conflict ==
In April 2009 Tehrik-i-Taliban Pakistan (TTP) from the neighbouring areas of Khyber Pakhtunkhwa entered the district following a peace deal with the government in Swat, Taliban fighters took over government buildings and killed those who resisted. On 22 April 2009, the Taliban took over the town forcing the police to retreat to their stations while they looted aid agency offices.

However, on 29 April 2009, the troops of Pakistan Army were deployed in the town as part of an effort to drive out Taliban militants from Buner region.

== Lightning hotspots ==
Daggar town and this region is one of the top 100 hotspots of lightning according to the research published on ScienceMag.org. The data obtained from satellites between January 1998 and December 2013 showed that this area observed 143 flashes of lightning per km^{2} per year.
