= Buner District =

Coordinates: 34.5169°N 72.4839°E

Buner District ضلع بونیر بونېر ولسوالۍ
- District of Khyber Pakhtunkhwa
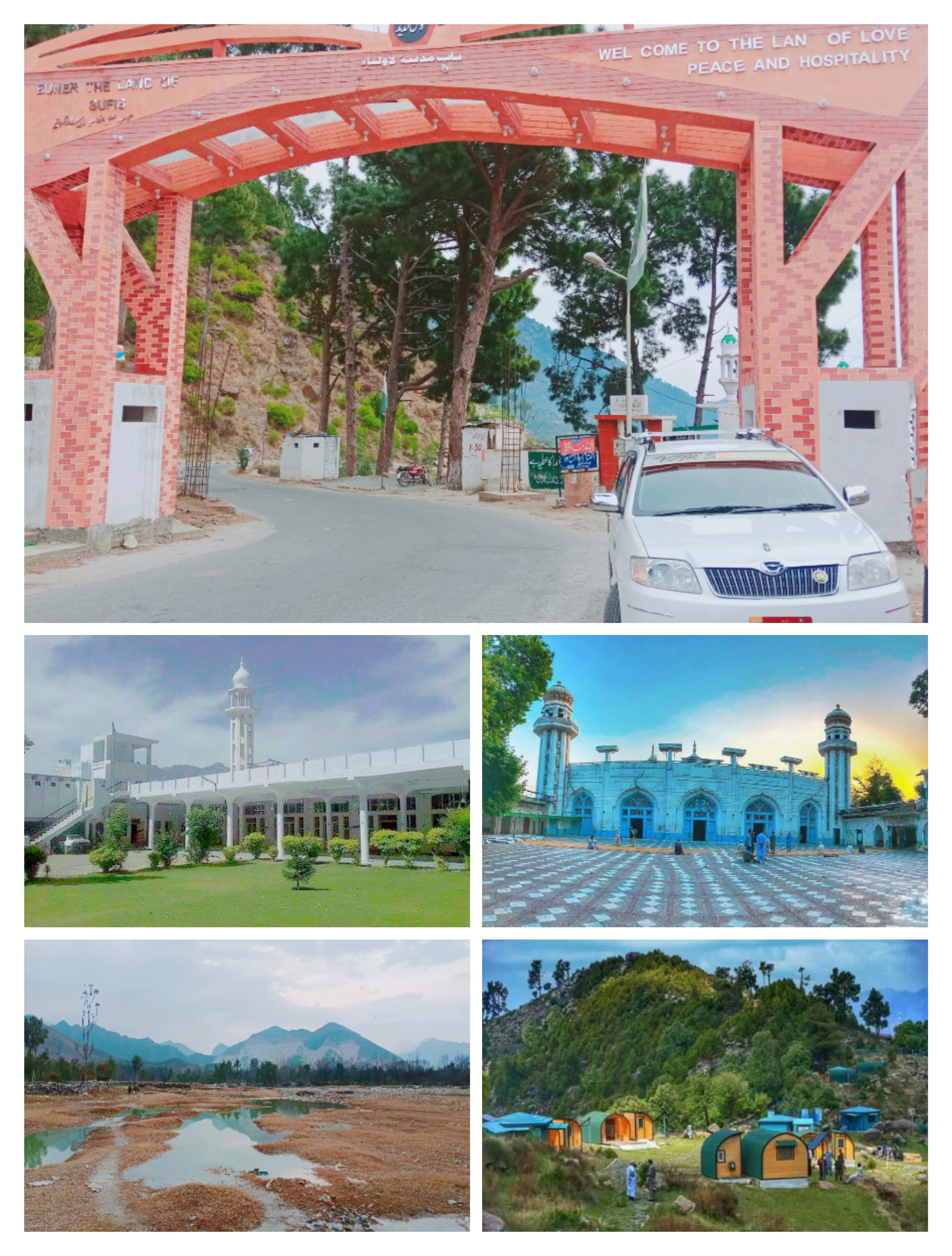
- Top: Karrakarr Buner Gateway :Tabligh Markaz : Pir Baba Masjid: Torwarsak Mountain:Mahabanrr Tourist Camps
- Nickname: Gul Da Namair
- Motto: The Land of sufis اولیاء کی سرزمین
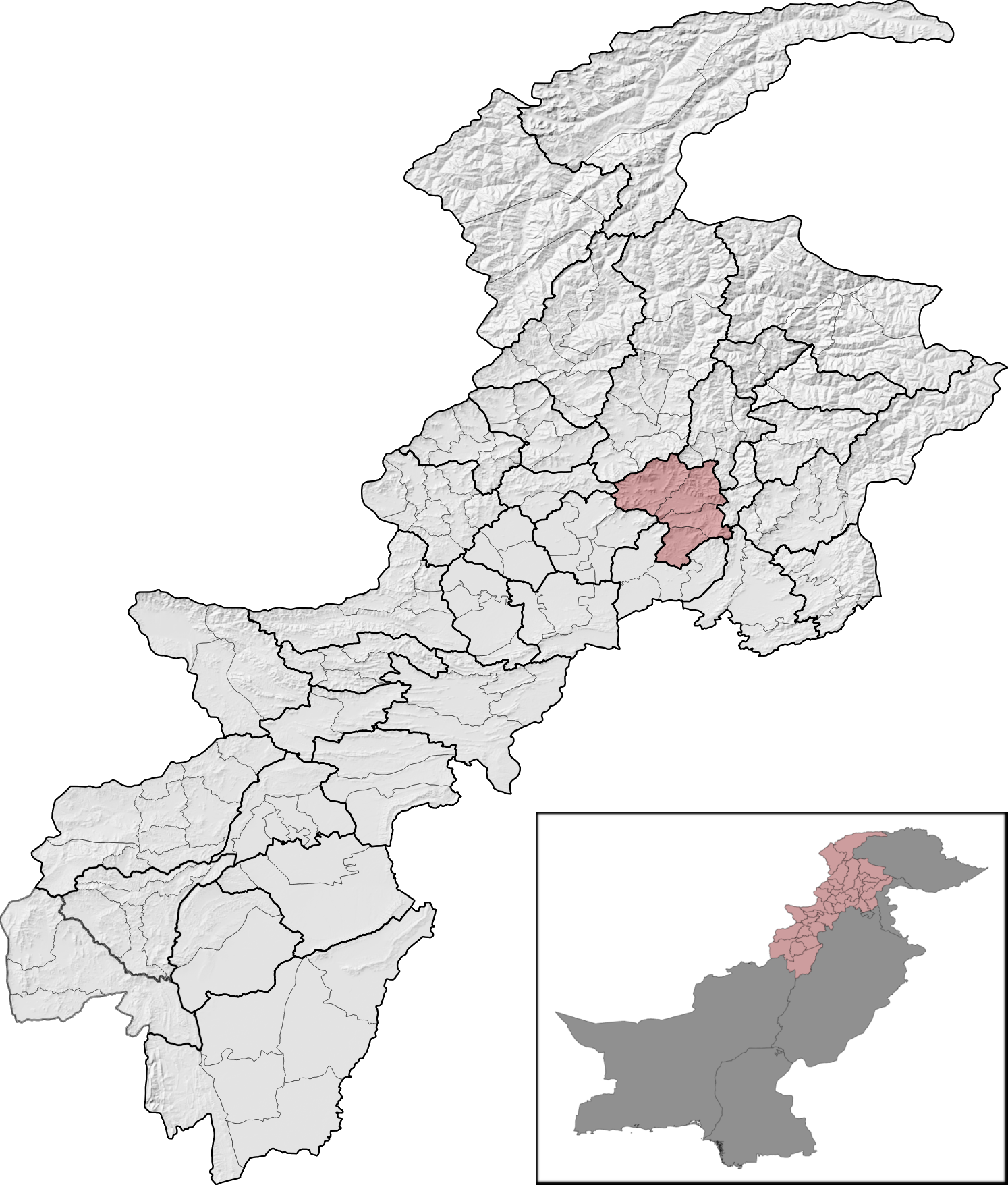
- Buner District (red) in Khyber Pakhtunkhwa
- Country: Pakistan
- Province: Khyber Pakhtunkhwa
- Division: Malakand
- District: 1998
- Headquarters: Daggar

Government
  - Type: District Administration
  - Deputy Commissioner: Hamid Ali
  - District Health Officer: Akhtar Nawaz

Area
  - District of Khyber Pakhtunkhwa: 1,865 km^{2} (720 sq mi)

Population (2023)
  - District of Khyber Pakhtunkhwa: 1,016,869
  - Density: 545.2/km^{2} (1,412/sq mi)
  - Urban: 0
  - Rural: 1,016,869
- Demonym: Buneri

Literacy
  - Literacy rate: Total: 43.75%; Male: 60.61%; Female: 27.40%
- Time zone: UTC+5 (PST)
- Postal code of Daggar: 19290
- Area code: 0939
- Number of Tehsils: 6
- Number of Union Councils: 27
- Website: buner.kp.gov.pk

Buner District (Pashto: بونېر ولسوالۍ, Urdu: ضلع بونیر) is a district in the Malakand Division of the Khyber Pakhtunkhwa province of Pakistan. Before receiving the status of a district in 1991, it was a tehsil in Swat District.

Buner, known for its large marble reserves, is home to the Shrine of Pir Baba, a Sufi saint and spiritual guide of the Mughal Emperor Babur. The armies of Alexander the Great passed through the district, most notably in Karakar, Daggar, and Ambela. The locals later fought Mughal and British armies.

Buner's altitude starts at 1200 ft in the south in Totalai and reaches a maximum height of 9,550 ft at the Dosara Peak in the north. Most of the hills that encircle the Buner District are covered in pine trees. The Barandu, Chamla, and Budal are the three principal rivers; the former flows through the center of the district. The majority of people reside in rural areas, where agriculture is their primary source of income. The region's principal crops include sugarcane, tobacco, wheat, and maize.

The marble reserves of Buner make up 68% of the total marble reserves of Pakistan. A total of 450 factories and 316 marble mines currently operate in Buner District, annually contributing Rs 470m in royalty.

== History ==
The Buner Valley lies between Swabi to the south and Swat to the north. It is a valley dotted with villages and divided into four sub-divisions. The Mora Hills and the Ilam range divide it from the Swat Valley, while the Sinawar range from Yusafzai, the Guru mountains from the Mardan Valley, and the Duma range from the Puran Valley.

During the 1580s, a significant uprising against the Mughal Empire took place among the Yusufzai tribe. In late 1585, Mughal Emperor Akbar sent military forces under Zain Khan Koka and Birbal to crush the rebellion. In February 1586, near the Karakar Pass, about 8,000 Mughal soldiers, including Birbal, were killed by the Yusufzai lashkar, led by Kalu Khan. This was the greatest disaster faced by the Mughal Army during Akbar's reign.

During the 19th century, the inhabitants of Buner stood up twice against the British Raj during the Ambela Campaign and their rebellion in the 1897 Frontier Revolt.

In April 2009, militants of the extremist Tehrik-i-Taliban Pakistan seized control of Buner after a short battle with the local residents and began imposing strict regulations, which reportedly included the closure of video stores, ban on trimming beards, and restrictions on women's presence in public spaces. On 29 April, the Government of Pakistan responded to the Taliban by deploying the army to the region, even parachuting troops in via helicopters. By the end of May 2009, almost the entire Buner was liberated from the Taliban's grip.

=== 2025 flash flood ===
On the morning of August 15th, 2025, a cloudburst occurred in Beshonai village of Buner, causing more than 150 mm of rain in one hour only. This led to flash floods in the district. Other villages affected severely included Pir Baba, Qadar Nagar, and Chagharzi.

The destruction caused by the flash flood was devastating. More than 200 people tragically lost their lives in Buner alone. Entire families were wiped out along with their homes when the Beshonai village was hit by giant rocks that were forced down from a mountain by the intense cloudburst.

In the aftermath of the flood, the KP government released PKR 150 Million to cater to the immediate needs of the situation. Afterwards, the government raised PKR 500 Million for Buner.

== Demographics ==
=== Population ===
Historical population
Year	Pop.	±% p.a.
1951	109,147	—
1961	123,217	+1.22%
1972	187,984	+3.91%
1981	265,517	+3.91%
1998	506,048	+3.87%
2017	895,460	+3.05%
2023	1,016,869	+2.14%

As of the 2023 census, Buner district has 118,665 households and a population of 1,016,869. The district has a sex ratio of 99.90 males to 100 females and a literacy rate of 43.75%: 60.61% for males and 27.40% for females. 310,484 (30.54% of the surveyed population) are under 10 years of age. The entire population lives in rural areas.

=== Languages ===
Languages of Buner district (2023)
1. Pashto (95.0%)
2. Hindko & Gujari (5.00%)

At the time of the 2023 census, 95.91% of the population spoke Pashto and 2.07% Hindko as their first language.

=== Ethnic groups ===
Pashtun, Gujjar and Sayeds are Major ethnic groups in the Buner district. Other ethnic groups in region are Swati and Chitarali.

=== Religions ===
Religion in Buner District
Religion	2017		2023	
Religion	Pop.	%	Pop.	%
Islam	894,058	99.84%	1,013,575	99.70%
Hinduism	246	0.03%	141	0.01%
Christianity	23	~0%	1,872	0.18%
Sikhism	—N/a	—N/a	1,200	0.10%
Others	1,133	0.13%	63	0.01%
Total Population	895,460	100%	1,016,674 (Note: Different from official population figure since it excludes sensitive areas where religion was not asked)	100%

== Administration ==
=== Buner Tehsils ===
Buner District is subdivided into 6 Tehsils:

Tehsil	Name (Urdu) (Pashto)	Area (km²)	Pop. (2023)	Density (ppl/km²) (2023)	Literacy rate (2023)	Union Councils
Daggar Tehsil	(Urdu: تحصیل ڈگر)(Pashto: ډاګر تحصیل)	290	192,776	664.74	47.57%	
Gadezai Tehsil	(Urdu: تحصیل سلارزئی گدیزئی)(Pashto: {{script/Arabic|ګدېزي سلارزئي تحصیل)	472	197,466	418.36	44.22%	
Gagra Tehsil	(Urdu: تحصیل گاگرہ)(Pashto: ګګرا تحصیل)	217	179,087	825.29	46.22%	
Khudu Khel Tehsil	(Urdu: تحصیل خدو خیل)(Pashto: خدو خېل تحصیل)	343	136,560	398.13	45.10%	
Mandanr Tehsil	(Urdu: تحصیل چملہ)(Pashto: چملا تحصیل)	325	185,031	569.33	39.47%	

=== National assembly ===
This district is represented by one elected MNA (Member of National Assembly) in Pakistan National Assembly. Its constituency is NA-28.

Election	Member	Party
2002	Sher Akbar Khan	PPP (S)
2008	Istiqbal Khan	ANP
2013	Sher Akbar Khan	JI
2018	Sher Akbar Khan	PTI
2024	Barrister Gohar Ali	IND.

=== Provincial assembly ===
The district has three constituencies in the Provincial Assembly of Khyber Pakhtunkhwa and one in the National Assembly of Pakistan.

Member of Provincial Assembly	Party affiliation	Constituency	Year
Riaz Khan	Pakistan Tehreek-e-Insaf	PK-20 Buner-I	2024
Syed Fakhr e Jehan	Pakistan Tehreek-e-Insaf	PK-21 Buner-II	2024
Abdul Kabir Khan	PTI	PK-22 Buner-III	2024

== Education ==
- University of Buner

== Largest villages ==
- Torwarsak is the most populated town in Buner which had population of about 39,514 in 2023.

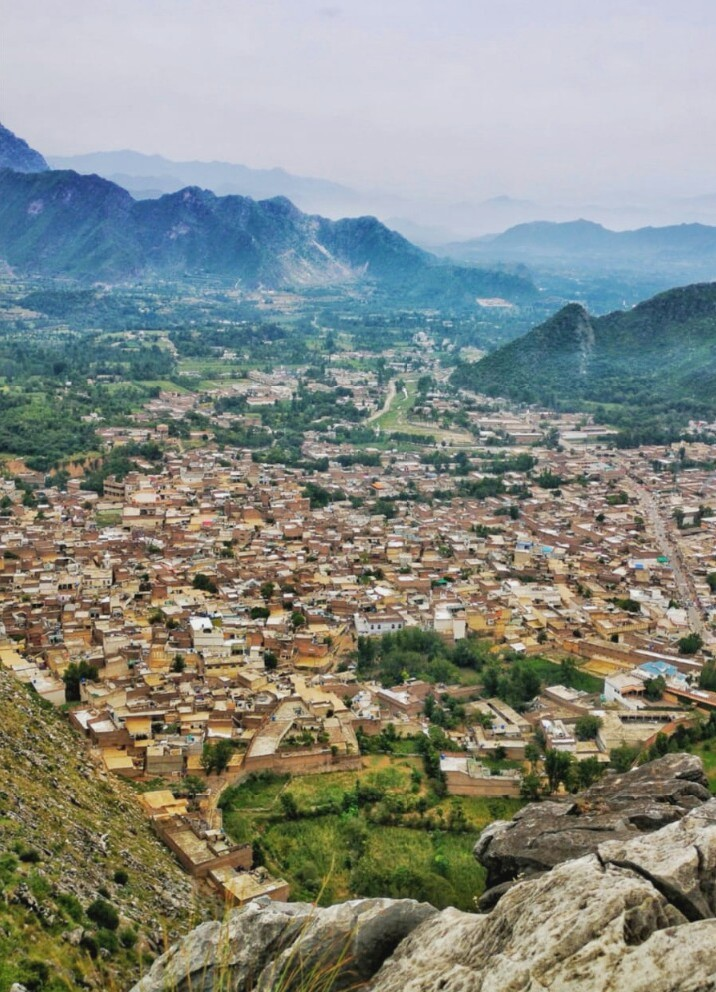
Torwarsak village in 2020

- Totalai is the second most populated town with population of about 28,975 in 2023.
- Ellai is the third most populated town with population of about 26,965 in 2023.
- Rega, Buner is the fourth most populated town with population of about 25,538 in 2023.
- Bajkata the population of bajkata union council is approximately 20,017 people in 2017 according to local administrative and national census record.
- Kalpani is another town with a population of about 18,500 in 2018.

== See also ==
- Rustam, Mardan
- Mardan
- Swabi
