= Akazai =

Yousafzai Pashtun tribe

Akazai (Pashto: اکازي) is a Pashtun tribe hailing from Khyber Pakhtoonkhwa province formerly known as Northwest Frontier Province of Pakistan. Specifically, it is a subdivision of the Isazai clan within the larger Yousafzai tribe. The Yousafzai tribe is widely recognized as one of the largest, most important and powerful of the Pashtun tribes. Military historian Colonel Harold Carmichael Wylly offers a personal perspective on the vast Yousafzai tribe, stating:

"The Yousafzai is an agriculturist, generally a fine, well-limbed man of a good physique and appearance with great deal of race-pride, well dressed and cheery, while his hospitality is proverbial".

== Origin ==
The Akazais are considered to be a tribe among The Black Mountain (Tor Ghar) Tribes, a division of the Isazai clan of the Yousafzai tribe.Yusuf, the eponymous ancestor of the Yusufzai tribe, had five sons: Ako, Musa, Isa, Mali, and Awria. They are the descendants of Aka, the son of Isa (Isazai). Akazais are further divided into four sections with each section having three or more sub-sections.

=== Sections and sub-sections ===
Sub Clan	Section	Sub-section (Khel)
Akazai	Aziz Khel	Darja Khel, Kala Khel, Rasul Khel and Sain Khel
	Barat Khel	Biba Khel, Chamba Khel and Khan Khel
	Painda Khel	Awal Khel, Jogi Khel and Lal Khel (or Malal Khel)
	Tasan Khel	Akozai, Ghazi Khan and Mamuzai

== Demographics ==
The Akazai tribe occupies the western slopes of a mountainous region known as Tor Ghar (meaning "Black Mountain"). Akazais also inhabit a portion of the crest of Tor Ghar on the northern side of Hassanzais. On their eastern side is part of Agror, to the north are Chagharzais (Nasrat Khel and Basi Khel) while to the west is the famous Indus River. The southern face of Machai Sar ("Peak"), which is the highest peak (9817 feet) of Tor Ghar, belongs to the Akazais. The main Akazai villages are Kand (Upper and Lower), Bimbal and Bilianrey. Other villages are Darbanrey, Kanar, Bakrey, Laid, Lashora, Bakianra, Moraata, Torum, and Larey. During the period of Sikh rule and up to 1868, Akazais held the village of Shatut in Agror valley (Tehsil Oghi). For better prospects of life, Akazais migrated to adjoining area and cities within Pakistan.Those Akazais who migrated from Tor Ghar are now living in Tehsil Oghi (adjoining Tor Ghar), Pakhal Valley and Konsh Valley - Chinarkot Mansehra district, Malikpura - Abbottabad, Khalabat Township, Nara Gandgar, Haripur, Karachi, Rawalpindi and Burhan in District Attock.

== Fighting against the British ==
During the British Rule 1858 to 1947, Tor Ghar had never been under its administration. The Akazais, along with the Hassanzais, were very active in fighting against the British.

The fighting character and bravery of the tribe was described by Sir William Wilson Hunter as follows:

The Campaign of 1863 taught us to our cost that an expedition against the Fanatical Encampment may mean a war with a coalition of 53,000 fighting men of the bravest races in the world. The inaccessible character of the country renders the temper and the internal relations of the tribes a matter of uncertainty with our Frontier officers; and whenever the Rebel Settlement suffers a defeat, it has merely to fall back deeper into the recesses of the Mahában.

The Indian-British government sent five major expeditions to Tor Ghar to suppress The Black Mountain (Tor Ghar) Tribes at different times:

- First Black Mountain Expedition – 1852–1853. The occasion was the murder of two British officers named Carne and Tapp from Salt Department during Autumns, 1851. This operation was conducted from December 1852 to January 1853. The force consisted of 3,800 troops commanded by Lieutenant Colonel Mackeson, C.B. In this expedition, five soldiers were killed and 10 wounded.
- Second Black Mountain Expedition – 1868. The occasion was an attack on a British police post at Oghi in the Agror Valley by Hassanzai, Akazai and Chagharzai tribes. This operation was conducted during October 1868. The force consisted of 12,544 troops commanded by Major General Wilde. In this expedition, 55 soldiers were killed and 29 wounded.
- Third Black Mountain Expedition – 1888. This operation is also called The First Hazara Expedition 1888. The cause was the constant raids made by the tribes on villages in British territory, culminating in an attack on a small British detachment, in which two English officers were killed. It was conducted from Ist October to 11 November 1888. The force consisted of 9,416 troops commanded by Major General J. McQueen. In this expedition, 25 soldiers were killed and 57 wounded.
- Fourth Black Mountain Expedition – 1891. This operation is also called The Second Hazara Expedition, 1891. The Black Mountain tribes fired on a force within British limits. It was conducted from March to November 1891. The force consisted of 7,289 troops commanded by Major General W.K. Elles. In this expedition, nine soldiers were killed and 39 wounded.
- Isazai Expedition – 1892. The occasion was defiance of the agreements executed by the tribes and flagrant violation of the settlement. This operation was aimed to suppress the three Isazai clans i.e. Hassanzai, Akazai and Mada Khel. It was conducted from September to October, 1892. The force consisted of 6,000 troops and 24 guns under the command of Major General William Lockhart (Indian Army officer). There was no war casualty in this expedition, however, 24 soldiers were killed by an epidemic of cholera.

After the creation of Pakistan on 14 August 1947, Tor Ghar was given the status of Tribal Area under the administration of the provincial government of Khyber Pakhtunkhwa (North West Frontier Province).

== Culture and traditions ==
Like all other Pashtuns, Akazais have maintained their cultural identity. They strictly follow the code of ethics of Pashtunwali, which comprises Manliness, Goodness, Gallantry, Loyalty and Modesty. Akazais have also maintained the Pashtoon customs of Jarga or Jirga (consultative assembly), Badal (justice or revenge) Nanawati (delegation pleading guilty), Hujhra (large drawing room) and Melmastya (hospitality).

== Language ==
Pushto is the basic language of Akazais. Having less interaction with other people/languages due rugged nature terrain and less roads; the Akazais of Black Mountain (Tor Ghar) speak the purest form of Pushto. Akazais who migrated to other areas have adopted local languages like; Hindko in Hazara Division and Urdu in other parts of the country specially Karachi.

== Creation of Tor Ghar District ==
On 28 January 2011, Tor Ghar became the 25th District of Khyber Pakhtoonkhwa. Judba is the district headquarters of this newly created district with following tehsils:

- Judba
- Kandar Hassanzai
- Daur Mera

Most of the Akazai areas come under the Kandar Hassanzai tehsil.
