= The Black Mountain tribes =

Tribes in Tor Ghar (Black Mountain) range

The Black Mountain (Tor Ghar), is located in the Hazara Division of the Khyber Pakhtunkhwa province of Pakistan. Tor Ghar is a Pashto (تور غر) phrase which means Black (Tor) Mountain (Ghar). It is also called Kala Dhaka, which means the same thing as its Pushto name; in Hindko a local language spoken by the people of Tanawal and Agror, which are located on southern and eastern side of Tor Ghar. Tor Ghar lies to the east of the Indus River from Thakot to Darband. The total length of the mountain is about twenty five to thirty miles and its average height is about 8,000 feet (2,400 m) feet above sea level. Machai Sar is the highest peak, which is 9,817 ft (2,992 m) above sea level. It ascends from the Indus river basin at its southern end near the village of Kiara and goes up to its watershed near the village Baradar; then it runs north-east by north to the point on the crest known as Chitabat. From here the range runs due north, finally descending to the Indus by two large spurs, at the foot of the easternmost of which lies Thakot. The Indus, after passing Thakot, turns westward along the northern foot of the mountain until it washes the western of the two aforementioned spurs, when it takes a sharp bend to the south, and runs below and parallel to the western foot of this mountain range.

== Boundaries ==
Tor Ghar is bounded on the south by Tanawal; on the east by Agror, Pariari, Tikari, Nandihar and Deshi; on the northern extremity lies the Indus and Thakot; and on the west, between the crest and the Indus. These slopes fall steeply from the crest for some 2,000 ft (610 m); then there is a zone of gentle, well-cultivated slopes, and then from 4000 to 5000 feet altitude the hill drops precipitously to the Indus. The actual Indus Valley here varies in width from a few hundred yards to nearly two miles, being narrowest at Kotkai and at its broadest at Palosi. It is crossed at about eleven different points by ferries, the boats holding from twenty to thirty passengers. In the early twentieth century, the inhabitants passed over the river on inflated skins.

== Mountain ==
The Black Mountain (Tor Ghar) lies between 34º32' and 34º50' N, and 72º48' and 72º58' E. The mountain may be described as a long, narrow ridge with higher peaks at intervals, and occasional deep passes; the general outline of the crest is more rounded than sharp. The numerous large spurs projecting from the sides are often precipitous and rocky, with deep, narrow glens or gorges lying between them, in which are some of the smaller villages of the tribes, the larger ones being, as a rule, situated on the banks of the Indus. The whole of the upper portion of the mountain is thickly wooded, with pine, oak, sycamore, horse-chestnut and wild cherry. The crest of the mountain is crossed by several passes.

== Climate ==
The climate of Tor Ghar (Black Mountain) is very fine in spring and autumn but winters are very severe because of the snowfall in sufficient quantity which stops communication over the crest. From proximity of the mountain to the Sulky valley of the Indus, the heat in summer even at the highest elevation is nearly as warm as that of the plains. Heavy rain generally falls in the spring and early autumn and storms frequently occur.

== Principal tribes ==
Tor Ghar is inhabited by the following sub-clans of Yousafzai Pashtun tribe:

- Mada Khel
- Hassanzai
- Akazai
- Chagharzai

The Yousafzai tribe is widely recognized as one of the largest, most important and powerful of the Pathan tribes. Military historian Colonel Harold Carmichael Wylly offers a personal perspective on the vast Yousafzai tribe, stating:

"The Yousafzai is an agriculturist, generally a fine, well-limbed man of a good physique and appearance with great deal of race-pride, well dressed and cheery, while his hospitality is proverbial".

Yousaf (Yousafzai) had five sons; Aku, Musa, Isa, Malay and Auriya. Isa (Isazai) had three sons; Mada, Hassan and Aka; Mada Khels, Hassanzais and Akazais are their descendants. The Chagarzais are the descendants of Chaghar, son of Malay (Malayzai). These sub-clans are described in detail in the succeeding sections.

== Mada Khel ==
Mada Khel is a division of the Isazai clan of Yousafzai tribe. They are among the dwellers on the Black Mountain. The Mada Khel country is on the northern slopes of the Mahaban Mountain down to the right bank of the Indus, and is bounded on the north by the Hassanzais, on the east by the Indus, and on the south and west by the Tanolis and Amazais. Most of the villages are on the Mahaban Mountain, only two being on the banks of the Indus. The easiest approaches to Mada Khel territory pass through the Hassanzai territory. Mada Khels are further divided into following Sections and Sub-sections:

Sub Clan	Section	Sub-section (Khel)
Madakhel	Hasanbaz Khel	Badu Khel, Bara Khel and Gunda Khel
	Bazid Khel	Alrabi Khel and Tota Khel
	Hassan Khel	Bin Khel, Said Ali Khel and Sultan Khel
	Mada Nama

== Hassanzai ==
The Hassanzais are a division of the Isazai clan of Yousafzai tribe and live on either side of the Indus; those cis-Indus occupy the most southern portion of the western slopes of Tor Ghar, while those trans-Indus live immediately opposite to them. The former area is bounded on the north and east by the Akazais, on the west by the Indus, and on the south the Hassanzai border adjoins the territory of Tanawal, the former state of Amb. The Hassanzais are further divided into following ten Sections:

Sub Clan	Section
Hassanzai	Khan Khel
	Kotwal
	Zakaria Khel
	Mir Ahmad Khel
	Lukman Khel
	Kaka Khel
	Dada Khel
	Manun Khel
	Nanu Khel
	Nasrat Khel

== Akazai ==
The Akazais are a division of the Isazai clan of Yousafzai tribe. Akazais inhibit a portion of the crest and western slopes of the Tor Ghar; to the north of Hassanzais having on the east a part of Agror and Piriarey; to the North Chagharzais (Nasrat Khel and Basi Khel) and to the West the Indus. The southern face of Machai Sar (Peak) belongs to Akazais, which is the highest (9817 feet) peak of Tor Ghar. Their main villages are Kand (Upper and Lower), Bimbal and Bilianrey. Other Akazai villages are Darbanrey, Kanar, Bakrey, Laid, Lashora, Bakianra, Moraata, Torum and Larey. During the Sikh Rule and up to 1868 Akazais held the village of Shahtut in Agror valley (Tehsil Oghi). For better prospects of life, Akazais migrated to adjoining area and cities within Pakistan. Akazais who migrated from Tor Ghar are now living in Tehsil Oghi (adjoining Tor Ghar), Pakhal Valley and Konsh Valley - Chinarkot Mansehra district, Malikpura - Abbottabad, Khalabat Township, Haripur, Karachi, Rawalpindi and Burhan in District Attock. Akazais are further divided into following Sections and Sub-sections:-.

Sub Clan	Section	Sub-section (Khel)
Akazai	Aziz Khel	Darja Khel, Kala Khel, Rasul Khel and Sain Khel
	Barat Khel	Biba Khel, Chamba Khel and Khan Khel
	Painda Khel	Awal Khel, Jogi Khel and Lal Khel (or Malal Khel)
	Tasan Khel	Akozai, Ghazi Khan and Mamuzai

== Chagharzai ==
The Chagharzais or Chagarzais are a division of the Malayzai clan of the Yousafzai tribes. They are the descendants of Chaghar (Chagharzai) the son of Malay (Malayzai) who was one of the sons of Yousaf (Yousafzai). They occupy the country on either side of the River Indus, those cis-Indus being located on the western slopes of Tor Ghar, to the north of the Akazais. They are divided into three sub-divisions. The southern boundary of the cis-Indus Chagharzais is contiguous with that of the Akazais, and follows the spur of the Tor Ghar running from the Machai Sar (peak) to the Indus bank — the southern face of the spur belonging to the Akazais and the northern to the Chagharzais. On the west and north, the Indus forms the boundary, while on the east the Chagarzais are bounded by the territory of the Deshiwals, a clan of the Swati tribe and of the Pariari Saiyids. The three Chagharzai sub-divisions are further divided into following Sections and Sub-sections:

Sub Clan	Section	Sub-section (Khel)
Chagharzai	Ferozai	Bai Khel, Juna Khel and Makki Khel.
	Basi Khel	Daud Khel, Shahu Khel, Khwaja Khel, Kalandar Khel, Kasan Khel and Babujan Khel
	Nasrat Khel	Hanju Khel, Haider Khel, Lukman Khel and Badha Khel Baba Khel

== The 'Black Mountain Campaigns' by the British ==
The Black Mountain (Tor Ghar) Tribes had never been under direct British Rule, although it was generally accounted to be part of the 'Frontier Region/Provincial Tribal Areas' from circa 1901 onwards and nominally attached to the then Hazara district. The tribes had been involved in fighting with British for quite some time, and a number of famous 'Black Mountain Expeditions' or 'Campaigns' took place between 1852 and the 1920s. Brief account of the British Expeditions against the Tor Ghar Tribes is as under:

- First Black Mountain Expedition - 1852-1853. The occasion was the murder of two British officers named Carne and Tapp from Salt Department during Autumns, 1851. This operation was conducted from December 1852 to January 1853. The force consisted of 3,800 troops commanded by Lieutenant Colonel Frederick Mackeson, C.B. In this expedition, five soldiers were killed and 10 wounded.
- Second Black Mountain Expedition - 1868. The occasion was an attack on a British police post at Oghi in the Agror Valley by Hassanzai, Akazai and Chagharzai tribes. This operation was conducted during October 1868. The force consisted of 12,544 troops commanded by Major General Alfred Thomas Wilde. In this expedition, 55 soldiers were killed and 29 wounded.
- Third Black Mountain Expedition - 1888. This operation is also called The First Hazara Expedition 1888. The cause was the constant raids made by the tribes on villages in British territory, culminating in an attack on a small British detachment, in which two English officers were killed. It was conducted from Ist October to 11 November 1888. The force consisted of 9,416 troops commanded by Major General J.W. McQueen. In this expedition, 25 soldiers were killed and 57 wounded.
- Fourth Black Mountain Expedition - 1891. This operation is also called The Second Hazara Expedition, 1891. The Black Mountain tribes fired on a force within British limits. It was conducted from March to November 1891. The force consisted of 7,289 troops commanded by Major General W.K. Elles. In this expedition, 9 soldiers were killed and 39 wounded.

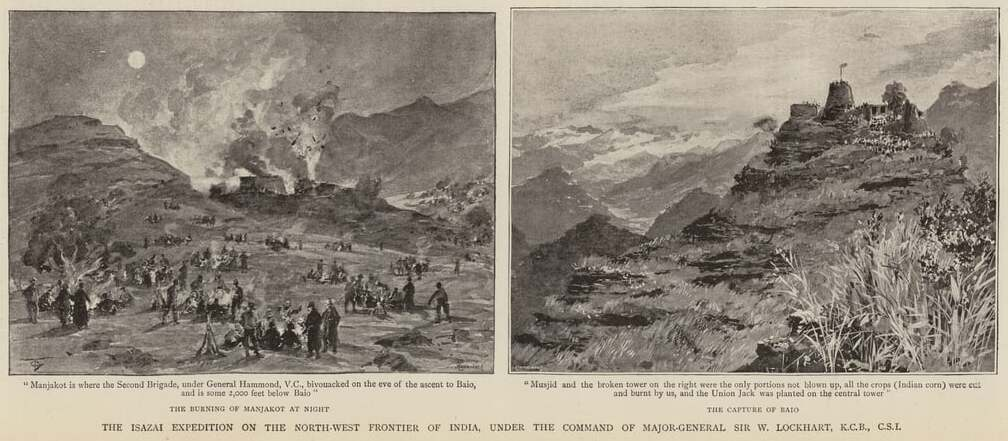
The Isazai Expedition on the North-West Frontier of India. The Graphic 1892

- Isazai Expedition,1892. The occasion was defiance of the agreements executed by the tribes and flagrant violation of the settlement. This expedition was aimed against the three Isazai clans i.e. Hassanzai, Akazai and Mada Khel and was conducted from September to October, 1892. The force consisted of 6,000 troops under the command of Major General William Lockhart (Indian Army officer). In this expedition 24 soldiers were killed by an epidemic of cholera and not by enemy fire.

== Culture and Traditions of the Tribes ==
Like all other Pashtuns, the Black Mountain (Tor Ghar) tribes are leadings their lives strictly in accordance with the code of ethics of Pashtunwali. These ethics are Manliness, Goodness, Gallantry, Loyalty and Modesty. They are also maintaining the Pashtoon customs of Jarga or Jirga (consultative assembly), Nanawati (delegation pleading guilty), Hujhra (large drawing room), Badal (justice or revenge) and Melmastya (hospitality).

== Tor Ghar in Khyber Pakhtoonkhwa ==
After the creation of Pakistan on 14 August 1947, Tor Ghar was given the formal status of a 'Provincially Administered Tribal Area' (PATA). Since then it has been under the administrative control of Khyber Pakhtoonkhwa, then North-West Frontier Province.

Tor Ghar became the 25th District of Khyber Pakhtoonkhwa on 28 January 2011. Judba is the district headquarters of this new district with the following tehsils:

- Judba
- Kandar Hassanzai
- Daur Mera
