= Isazai Expedition - 1892 =

The Isazai Expedition of 1892 was a brief, punitive military campaign conducted by the British Indian Army on the North-West Frontier of British India. The operation took place from September to October 1892 in the rugged Tor Ghar (Black Mountain) region of the Hindu Kush, located in modern-day Khyber Pakhtunkhwa, Pakistan.

== Background and objectives ==
The expedition was organized against the Hassanzai, Akazai, and Mada Khel clans, which were three branches of the Isazai (a clan of the larger Yousafzai Pashtun tribe).The expedition was ordered because the tribes had violated an agreement reached with the British following the Hazara Expedition of 1891. Following earlier British campaigns in the region in 1888 and 1891, the Isazai clans had signed a peace settlement. A key condition of this 1891 agreement was the banishment of their prominent leader, Hashim Ali Khan, whom the British considered an outlaw and a major instigator of border raids. However, in 1892, the clans violated the treaty by harboring Hashim Ali Khan and permitting his return to the village of Baio near the Indus River. In response to this defiance, the Government of India sanctioned a punitive mission to capture the chief, punish the non-compliant villages, and enforce the border settlements.

== Isazai Field Force ==
The British mobilized a force named the Isazai Field Force of roughly 6,000 troops and 24 artillery guns, concentrated at the base of Derband. The force was placed under the command of Major General William Lockhart (Indian Army officer).

=== First column (First Brigade) ===
Commander — Brigadier-General W. Galbraith, C.B.

- British Infantry: 1st Battalion, Royal Welsh Fusiliers
- Native Infantry:
  - 11th Bengal Infantry (Rajput Regiment)
  - 2nd Battalion, 5th Gurkha Rifles (Frontier Force)
- Artillery & Engineers:
  - No. 1 (Kohat) Mountain Battery
  - No. 4 (Hazara) Mountain Battery
  - No. 4 Company, Bengal Sappers and Miners

=== Second column (Second Brigade) ===
Commander — Brigadier-General A.G. Hammond, V.C., D.S.O.

- British Infantry: 2nd Battalion, Seaforth Highlanders
- Native Infantry:
  - 4th Sikh Infantry (Punjab Frontier Force)
  - 3rd Sikh Infantry (Punjab Frontier Force)
- Artillery & Engineers
  - No. 3 (Peshawar) Mountain Battery
  - No. 2 Company, Bengal Sappers and Miners

=== Reserve & line of communications — Darband base ===
- 28th Bengal Infantry (Punjabis)
- Khyber Rifles (Detachments for scouting)

== Operational chronology ==
=== Phase I - Concentration and logistics (September 26 – October 1) ===
- The structural foundation of the expedition relied on a tightly compressed timeline. By September 26, the railhead at Rawalpindi and the forward depot at Haripur were overwhelmed with supply trains moving thousands of pack mules.
- The Cholera Crisis: Upon concentrating at the main base camp of Darband, an immediate medical hurdle arose. A severe cholera outbreak manifested within the ranks. Major-General Lockhart instituted instant sanitary segregation: sources of drinking water along the Indus were strictly guarded, and regiments were kept in scattered bivouacs rather than a single dense camp. Despite losing 24 men to the disease before the march even began, the operational timeline was strictly maintained.
- Supply Allocation: Every soldier was stripped of excess baggage. The force moved with "frontier scale" kits—meaning no tents were carried by the infantry; troops slept in the open under blankets. Exactly 30 days of rations were packed onto the mule trains to ensure independence from local foraging.

=== Phase II: The multi-pronged advance (October 2) ===
At dawn on October 2, the two columns split from Darband to execute their distinct tactical roles.

- First Column's Lowland Movement: Brigadier-General Galbraith's column marched parallel to the Indus River's left bank. Their movement was slow, dictated by the pace of the River Flank Contingent, which towed flat-bottomed ferry boats upstream using thick ropes from the shore. The 1st Battalion, Royal Welsh Fusiliers led the vanguard, scanning the broken terraces across the river for tribal marksmen.
- Second Column's Ridge Ascent: Brigadier-General Hammond's column faced an immediate 3,000-foot vertical climb up the jagged spurs of the Black Mountain range. The 2nd Battalion, Seaforth Highlanders and the 4th Sikh Infantry climbed in a loose skirmishing formation.
- Engineering Interventions: The mountain tracks were completely impassable for the mule-drawn artillery of the No. 3 (Peshawar) Mountain Battery. No. 2 Company of the Bengal Sappers and Miners worked continuously at the front of the column, using dynamite and pickaxes to blast away rock lips, constructing a five-foot-wide ledge as they advanced. By nightfall, Hammond's force successfully occupied the commanding crests overlooking the Isazai valleys, denying the Yousafzai clans their traditional terrain advantage.

=== Phase III: The Indus River crossings (October 3) ===
The most critical operational test took place on October 3, as the First Column required transit to the Trans-Indus side to encircle the enemy.

- Artillery Positioning: Before a single boat was launched into the treacherous, swirling currents of the Indus, Lockhart ordered No. 1 (Kohat) and No. 4 (Hazara) Mountain Batteries to unlimber on elevated river terraces. Their 7-pounder rifled mountain guns were trained directly onto the opposite western bank to suppress potential tribal ambushes.
- The Crossing Maneuver: No. 4 Company, Bengal Sappers and Miners took command of the procured native flat-bottomed boats. Operating in rapid, synchronized relays, they ferried the 2nd Battalion, 5th Gurkha Rifles across the fast-moving river. The Gurkhas immediately scaled the western banks, establishing a secure perimeter and creating a protective bridgehead.
- Mule Transport Logistics: Transporting the artillery mules and supply animals across the deep current was highly complex. The animals were systematically guided into the water and forced to swim alongside the boats, tethered securely by their halters. Thanks to the overwhelming suppressive cover of the mountain guns, the entire First Column successfully crossed the Indus without a single casualty from hostile fire.

=== Phase IV: Convergence, demolition, and retrogression (October 4 – October 15) ===
On October 4, both columns tightened the loop around the primary tribal stronghold of Baio.

- The Discovery: As Hammond's column descended from the high ridges and Galbraith's column squeezed from the riverbank, British scouts entered the stone-walled settlement of Baio. They found it completely abandoned. Hashim Ali Khan, recognizing that his forces were utterly outmatched and outmaneuvered by Lockhart's dual-column strategy, had fled across the administrative border into the neutral territory of Buner the previous night.
- Punitive Demolition Phase (October 5 – October 10): To enforce the punishment sanctioned by the Government of India, Lockhart ordered the systematic destruction of the Isazai infrastructure. Over five days, the Sappers and Miners used heavy gunpowder charges to blow up all fortified stone towers (burgjs). The defensive compounds belonging to the Hasanzai and Akazai leaders were leveled, and their local grain reserves were confiscated or destroyed to ensure the clans could not launch winter raids.
- The Retrogression (October 11 – October 15): With the destruction phase completed, Lockhart chose not to pursue Hashim Ali Khan into Buner, avoiding a larger, multi-tribe frontier war. On October 11, the retrogression began. The Second Column acted as a strict rearguard, keeping tactical formations tight to prevent tribal remnants from harassing the retreating columns. The force arrived back at Darband without further incident, and the Isazai Field Force officially demobilized on October 15, 1892.

== Casualties and aftermath ==
Because the tribes avoided a pitch battle, the British force focused on punitive demolition, destroying the local towers, forts, and defense infrastructure before withdrawing. Remarkably, there were zero combat casualties during the brief operation. However, the British force suffered an outbreak of disease, losing 24 soldiers to a cholera epidemic before the field force was dismantled in October 1892. The expedition successfully resulted in the temporary pacification of the immediate Hazara border.
