= Madakhel =

Tribe in Pakistan

Madakhel (Pashto: مداخیل) is a Pashtun tribe hailing from Khyber Pakhtoonkhwa province formerly known as Northwest Frontier Province of Pakistan. Specifically, it is a subdivision of the Isazai (Pashto: عیسیٰ زی) clan within the larger Yousafzai tribe. The Yousafzai tribe is widely recognized as one of the largest, most important and powerful of the Pathan tribes. Military historian Colonel Harold Carmichael Wylly offers a personal perspective on the vast Yousafzai tribe, stating:

"The Yousafzai is an agriculturist, generally a fine, well-limbed man of a good physique and appearance with great deal of race-pride, well dressed and cheery, while his hospitality is proverbial".

== History ==
The Madakhels are from the family of The Black Mountain (Tor Ghar) Tribes. They are a division of the Isazai clan of the Yousafzai tribe. Yusuf, the eponymous ancestor of the Yusufzai tribe, had five sons: Ako, Musa, Isa, Mali, and Awria. They are the descendants of Mada the son of Isa (Isazai). The Madakhels are further divided into four Sections; each Section having two or more sub-sections.

== Sections and sub-sections ==
| Sub Clan | Section | Sub-section (Khel) |
| Madakhel | Hasanbaz Khel | Badu Khel, Bara Khel and Gunda Khel |
| | Bazid Khel | Alrabi Khel and Tota Khel |
| | Hassan Khel | Bin Khel, Said Ali Khel and Sultan Khel |
| | Mada Nama |

== Geography ==
Madakhels are among the dwellers on the Tor Ghar. Madakhel country is on the northern slopes of the Mahaban Mountain down to the right bank of the Indus and is bounded on the north by the Hassanzais, on the east by the Indus, on the south and west by the Tanolis and Amazais. Most of the villages are on Mahaban Mountain, with two on the banks of the Indus. The easiest approaches to Madakhel territory pass through Hassanzai territory.

== Culture and traditions ==
Like other Pashtoons, Madakhels maintained their cultural identity and individuality. They lead their lives in accordance with code of ethics of Pashtunwali, which combines Manliness, Goodness, Gallantry, Loyalty and Modesty. Madakhels have also maintained the Pashtoon customs of Jirga (Consultative Assembly), Nanawati (Delegation pleading guilty), Hujhra (Large drawing room) and Melmastya (Hospitality).

== Language ==
Pushto is the basic language of Madakhels. Living away from urban centres and having less interaction with people from other languages, Madakhels speak purest form of Pushto. Due to migrations for better prospects of life and marriages in non-Pushtoon families, some Madakhels adopted other languages such as Hindko and Urdu.

== Creation of Tor Ghar District ==
On 28 January 2011, Tor Ghar became the 25th district of Khyber Pakhtoonkhwa. Judba is the district headquarters of this newly born district with following tehsils:-

- Judba
- Kandar Hassanzai
- Daur Mera

Most of the Mada Khel areas come under the Daur Mera tehsil.
