= Hassanzai =

Yousafzai sub clan

The Hassanzai (Pashto: حسن‌زی) is a sub-clan of the Pashtun Yousafzai tribe. It is one of the divisions of the Isazai clan of the Yousafzai tribe. The Yousafzai tribe is regarded as one of the most powerful, famous, and respected tribes of the Pashtuns. Colonel H. C. Wylly (1858–1932) described these people in the following words:

The Yousafzai is an agriculturist, generally fine, well-limbed man, of a good physique and appearance with great deal of race-pride, well dressed and cheery, while his hospitality is proverbial.

== Origin ==
The Hassanzai are amongst The Black Mountain (Tor Ghar) Tribes; a division of the Isazai clan of the Yousafzai tribe. Yusuf, the eponymous ancestor of the Yusufzai tribe, had five sons: Ako, Musa, Isa, Mali, and Awria.They are the descendants of Hassan, the son of Isa.

== Demographics ==
The Hassanzais live on both sides of the River Indus; those cis-Indus occupy the most southern portion of the western slopes of Black Mountain (Tor Ghar), while those trans-Indus live immediately opposite to them. The Hassanzai area is bounded on the north and east by the Akazais, on the west by the Indus, and on the south the Hassanzai border adjoins the territory of Tanawal, the former territory of the Nawab of Amb.

== Sub-Sections (Khels) ==
The Hassanzais are further divided into following ten Sub-Sections:

Sub Clan	Section
Hassanzai	Khan Khel
	Kotwal
	Zakaria Khel
	Mir Ahmad Khel
	Lukman Khel
	Kaka Khel
	Dada Khel
	Manun Khel
	Nanu Khel
	Nasrat Khel

== Culture and traditions ==
Like all other Pashtuns, Hassanzais have maintained their cultural identity and individuality. They lead their lives strictly in accordance with code of ethics of Pashtunwali which comprises Manliness, Goodness, Gallantery, Loyalty and Modesty. Hassanzais have also maintained the Pashtoon customs of Jirga (Consultative Assembly), Nanawati (Delegation pleading guilty), Hujra (Large drawing room) and Melmastya (hospitality).

== Fighting against the British ==
The Black Mountain tribes had never been under the British Rule. Hassanzais along with Akazais had been actively involved in fighting with British for quite some time. The Indian-British government sent five major expeditions to Tor Ghar to suppress The Black Mountain (Tor Ghar) Tribes at different times.

- First Black Mountain Expedition - 1852–1853. The occasion was the murder of two British officers named Carne and Tapp from Salt Department during Autumns, 1851. This operation was conducted from December 1852 to January 1853. The force consisted of 3,800 troops commanded by Lieutenant Colonel Mackeson, C.B. In this expedition, five soldiers were killed and 10 wounded.
- Second Black Mountain Expedition - 1868. The occasion was an attack on a British police post at Oghi in the Agror Valley by Hassanzai, Akazai and Chagharzai tribes. This operation was conducted during October 1868. The force consisted of 12,544 troops commanded by Major General Wilde. In this expedition, 55 soldiers were killed and 29 wounded.
- Third Black Mountain Expedition - 1888. This operation is also called The First Hazara Expedition 1888. The cause was the constant raids made by the tribes on villages in British territory, culminating in an attack on a small British detachment, in which two English officers were killed. It was conducted from Ist October to 11 November 1888. The force consisted of 9,416 troops commanded by Major General J. McQueen. In this expedition, 25 soldiers were killed and 57 wounded.
- Fourth Black Mountain Expedition - 1891. This operation is also called The Second Hazara Expedition, 1891. The Black Mountain tribes fired on a force within British limits. It was conducted from March to November 1891. The force consisted of 7,289 troops commanded by Major General W.K. Elles. In this expedition, 9 soldiers were killed and 39 wounded.
- Isazai Expedition - 1892. The occasion was defiance of the agreements executed by the tribes and flagrant violation of the settlement. This operation was aimed to suppress the three Isazai clans i.e. Hassanzai, Akazai and Mada Khel. It was conducted from September to October, 1892. The force consisted of 6,000 troops and twenty-four guns under the command of Major General William Lockhart (Indian Army officer). There was no war casualty in this expedition, however, 24 soldiers were killed by an epidemic of cholera.

== Creation of Tor Ghar District ==
On 28 January 2011, Tor Ghar became the 25th district of Khyber Pakhtoonkhwa. Judba is the district headquarters of this new district with following tehsils:-

- Judba
- Kandar Hassanzai
- Daur Mera

Most of the Hassanzai areas come under the Kandar tehsil.

== Bibliography ==
- Wylly, Harold Carmichael (1912). "From the Black Mountain to Waziristan". London, Macmillan. OCLC 1045591389. OL 22880640M.
- Ibbetson, Sir Denzil; Maclagan, Edward Douglas; Rose, Horace Arthur (1911). A glossary of the tribes and castes of the Punjab and North-West frontier province. Lahore: Civil and Military Gazette Press. OCLC 1045586544.
- Murray, James Wolfe (1899). A Dictionary of the Pathan Tribes on the North-west Frontier of India. Calcutta: Office of the superintendent, government printing, India. OCLC 5132466. OL 18033226W.
- Paget, William Henry (1907). Frontier and Overseas Expeditions from India. Vol. 1. Simla: Government Monotype Press. LCCN 74151159. OCLC 1045567484.
- Singh, Surinder; Gaur, Iswar Dayal (2008). Popular Literature and Pre-modern Societies in South Asia. Pearson Education India. ISBN 978-81-317-1358-7. OCLC 276406323.
- Watson, H. D., ed. (1908). Gazetteer Of The Hazara District, 1907. London: Chatto & Windus.
- Mason, A H (1894). Expedition Against The Hasanzai And Akazai Tribes Of The Black Mountain 1891. Simla: Government Central Printing Office.
