= Hospitium =

Greco-Roman hospitality concept

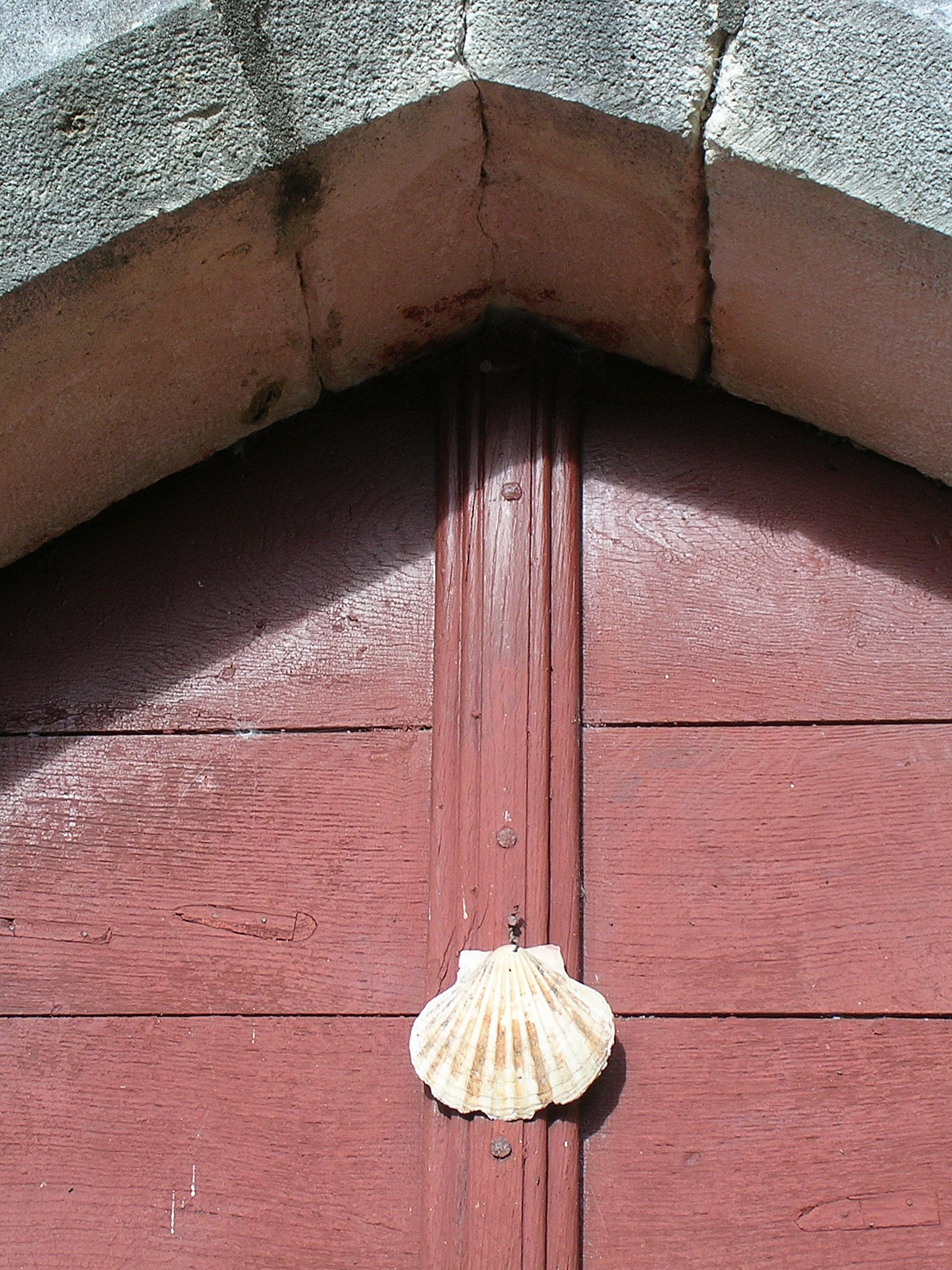
Scallop shell offering hospitality to pilgrims on the Way of St James

Hospitium ([hɔs̠ˈpɪt̪iʊ̃]; Greek: ξενία, xenia, προξενία) is the ancient Greco-Roman concept of hospitality as a divine right of the guest and a divine duty of the host, or hospes. Similar or broadly equivalent customs were and are also known in other cultures, though not always by that name. Among the Greeks and Romans, hospitium was of a twofold character: private and public.

== Private ==
In Homeric times, all strangers, without exception, were regarded as being under the protection of Zeus Xenios, the god of strangers and suppliants, and had the right to hospitality. (It is doubtful whether, as is commonly assumed, they were considered as ipso facto enemies; they were rather guests.) Immediately on his arrival, the stranger was clothed and entertained, and no inquiry was made as to his name or antecedents until the duties of hospitality had been fulfilled. When the guest parted from his host he was often presented with gifts (ξένια), and sometimes a die (ἀστράγαλος) was broken between them. Each then took a part, a family connection was established, and the broken die served as a symbol of recognition; thus the members of each family found in the other hosts and protectors in case of need.

Violation by the host of the duties of hospitality was likely to provoke the wrath of the gods; but it does not appear that anything beyond this religious sanction existed to guard the rights of a traveler. Similar customs seem to have existed among the Italian peoples. Amongst the Romans, private hospitality, which had existed from the earliest times, was more accurately and legally defined than amongst the Greeks, the tie between host and guest being almost as strong as that between patron and client. It was of the nature of a contract, entered into by mutual promise, the clasping of hands, and exchange of an agreement in writing (tabula hospitalis) or of a token (tessera or symbolum), and was rendered hereditary by the division of the tessera. The advantages thus obtained by the guest were, the right of hospitality when traveling and, above all, the protection of his host (representing him as his patron) in a court of law. The contract was sacred and inviolable, undertaken in the name of Jupiter Hospitalis, and could only be dissolved by a formal act.

== Public ==
This private connection developed into a custom according to which a state appointed one of the citizens of a foreign state as its representative Proxenos (πρόξενος) to protect any of its citizens travelling or resident in his country. Sometimes an individual came forward voluntarily to perform these duties on behalf of another state etheloproxenos (ἐθελοπρόξενος). The proxenus is generally compared to the modern consul or minister resident. His duties were to afford hospitality to strangers from the state whose proxenus he was, to introduce its ambassadors, to procure them admission to the assembly and seats in the theatre, and in general to look after the commercial and political interests of the state by which he had been appointed to his office.

Many cases occur where such an office was hereditary; thus the family of Callias at Athens were proxeni of the Spartans. We find the office mentioned in a Corcyraean inscription dating probably from the 7th century BC, and it continued to grow more important and frequent throughout Greek history. There is no proof that any direct emolument was ever attached to the office, while the expense and trouble entailed by it must often have been very great. Probably the honors which it brought with it were sufficient recompense. These consisted partly in the general respect and esteem paid to a proxenus, and partly in many more substantial honors conferred by special decree of the state whose representative he was, such as freedom from taxation and public burdens, the right of acquiring property in Attica, admission to the senate and popular assemblies, and perhaps even full citizenship.

Public hospitium seems also to have existed among the Italian races; but the circumstances of their history prevented it from becoming so important as in Greece. Cases, however, occur of the establishment of public hospitality between two cities (Rome and Caere, Livy v. 50), and of towns entering into a position of clientship to some distinguished Roman, who then became patronus of such a town. Foreigners were frequently granted the right of public hospitality by the senate down to the end of the republic. The public hospes had a right to entertainment at the public expense, admission to sacrifices and games, the right of buying and selling on his own account, and of bringing an action at law without the intervention of a Roman patron.

A full bibliography of the subject will be found in the article in Daremberg and Saglio, Dictionnaire des antiquités, to which may be added Rudolf von Jhering. Die Gastfreundschaft im Altertum (1887); see also Smith's Dictionary of Greek and Roman Antiquities (3rd ed., 1890).

== Medieval hospitia ==
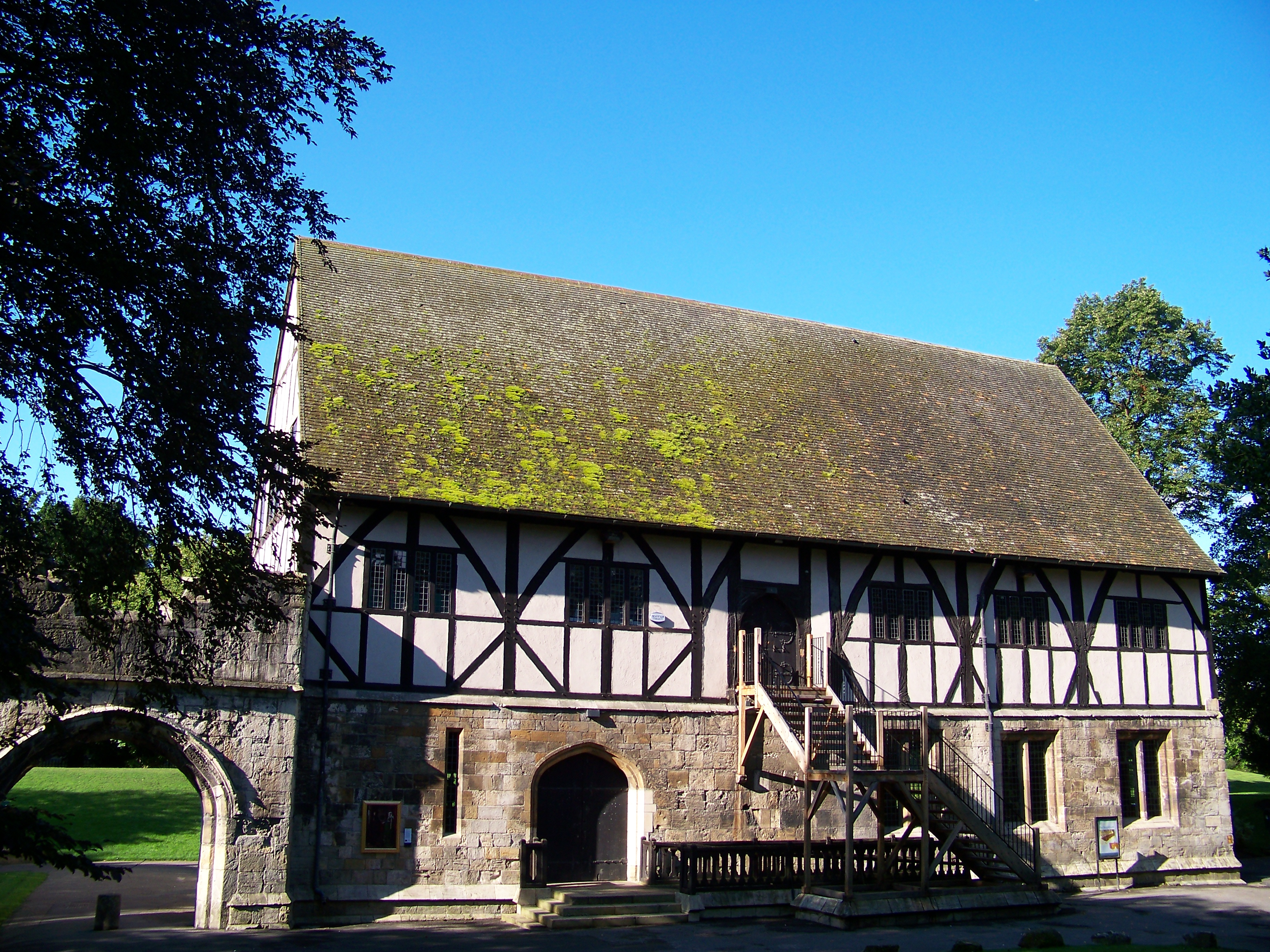
The former Hospitium of St Mary's Abbey, York, England

In the Middle Ages, the term was extended, across Europe, to refer to the building or complex of buildings attached to a monastery, where pilgrims and other lesser guests could find hospitality or hospitium, including dormitory-based accommodation.

== See also ==
- Proxeny
- Xenia (Greek)
- Hospitality law
- Nanawatai
- Melmastia
