= The Beast (1988 film) =

1988 American war film directed by Kevin Reynolds

- Theatrical release poster
- Directed by: Kevin Reynolds
- Screenplay by: William Mastrosimone
- Based on: Nənawā́te by William Mastrosimone
- Produced by: Gil Friesen
- Starring: George Dzundza; Jason Patric; Steven Bauer
- Cinematography: Douglas Milsome
- Edited by: Peter Boyle
- Music by: Mark Isham
- Distributed by: Columbia Pictures
- Release dates: September 5, 1988 (Deauville); September 7, 1988 (France); September 16, 1988 (United States)
- Running time: 111 minutes
- Country: United States
- Languages: English; Pashto
- Budget: $8 million
- Box office: $161,004

The Beast (also known as The Beast of War) is a 1988 American war film directed by Kevin Reynolds and written by William Mastrosimone, based on his play Nənawā́te. The film starred Jason Patric, George Dzundza, Steven Bauer, Stephen Baldwin, Don Harvey and Erick Avari. The film follows the crew of a Soviet T-55 tank who became lost during the Soviet war in Afghanistan. The film has enjoyed a cult-favorite status in spite of its low box office statistics.

== Plot ==
In 1981 Afghanistan, a Soviet tank unit viciously attacks a Pashtun village harboring a group of mujahideen fighters. Following the assault, one of the tanks—commanded by ruthless commander Daskal (George Dzundza)—takes a wrong turn through a mountain pass and enters a blind valley. Taj (Steven Bauer) returns to discover the village destroyed, and his father and brother killed—the latter by having been crushed under Daskal's tank. As the new khan following his brother's death, Taj is spurred to seek revenge and leads a band of mujahideen fighters into the valley to pursue Daskal's tank (which they call 'The Beast'), counting on their captured RPG-7 anti-tank weapon to destroy it.

Lost, isolated, and with their radio damaged in the village attack, the tank crew set out to find Kandahar Road and return to Soviet lines. While camping for the night, Afghan crewman Samad (Erick Avari) educates the reluctant tank driver, Konstantin Koverchenko (Jason Patric), about the Pashtun people's code of honour, Pashtunwali; particularly nanawatai, which requires that an enemy is to be given sanctuary if he asks.

En route, the crew suffer several setbacks and ambushes from Taj's band. Suspecting Samad to be a traitor, Daskal murders him in front of his men; Koverchenko threatens to report Daskal for the illegal killing. At a brief stop, Koverchenko reports that their tank is breaking down; Daskal accuses him of mutiny and orders gunner Kaminski (Don Harvey) and loader Golikov (Stephen Baldwin) to tie him to a rock, and leave him with a grenade behind his head as a booby-trap for the mujahideen. Wild dogs eventually attack Koverchenko, but he is saved when the grenade rolls off the rock and explodes, scaring them off. Taj's band reunite with several vengeful women from the village and find Koverchenko, who pleads for nanawatai. The mujahideen give him food and shelter. Koverchenko befriends Taj after fixing the band's broken RPG-7, and agrees to help him destroy the tank.

Meanwhile, the remaining tank crew finally realize they are trapped in the valley, until a Soviet helicopter appears and offers to rescue them. Daskal refuses to abandon his tank, and instead has it refueled. The crew heads back towards the narrow mountain pass where they entered, which the helicopter pilot says is the only way out. The crew drives through the night and find the helicopter crew dead, who flew past them and drank from a waterhole the tank crew poisoned earlier with cyanide.

The mujahideen and Koverchenko catch up with the tank and pursue it through the pass. Koverchenko finally fires the RPG after a tense chase, only to damage the tank's main gun. Just as it seems the tank will escape, the village women (armed with explosives) blow up the cliff-side, dropping boulders onto the tank and disabling it. Koverchenko sets fire to the tank's leaked fuel, forcing the crew to bail; he pleads nanawatai on their behalf, and Taj reluctantly agrees. Koverchenko confronts Daskal over his brutality, and desires that he live to see the Soviets lose the war.

Kaminski and Golikov flee on foot, but Daskal is chased down by the village women and murdered; they bring back his bloodied uniform to Taj as trophies. Horrified, Koverchenko waves down an arriving Soviet helicopter to be rescued. Koverchenko salutes Taj as he is hoisted by a harness, brandishing a jezail musket Taj had just gifted to him. Koverchenko flies off with the helicopter over the Afghan landscape.

== Cast ==
- George Dzundza as Warrant Officer "Tank Boy" Daskal
- Jason Patric as Konstantin Koverchenko
- Steven Bauer as Khan Taj
- Erick Avari as Samad
- Stephen Baldwin as Anton Golikov
- Donald Patrick Harvey as Kaminsky
- David Sherrill as Lieutenant Kovalyov
- Kabir Bedi as Akbar
- Chaim Jeraffi as Moustafa
- Shoshi Marciano as Sherina
- Yitzhak Ne'eman as Iskandar
- Roberto Pollack as Shahzaman
- Avi Gilor as Khahzaman
- Beni Baruchin as Afzal
- Victor Ken as Ali
- Avi Keedar as Noor
- Claude Aviram as Sadioue
- Moshe Vapnik as Hasan

== Production ==
=== Filming ===
The film was shot in Israel. Several actual T-55 tanks were used in the film; however, the helicopter used in the film was not a real Mi-8, but an Aerospatiale SA.321 Super Frelon. The tank in question in the movie is actually an Israeli modification of a Soviet T-55 captured by the Israelis from their Arab armies, redesignated as the Ti-67 and fitted with a 105mm main gun in place of the original 100mm gun, leading some to mistake it for a T-62. The Ti-67 tank in particular is more distinctly known as the Tiran 5Sh. Many of these conversions were used by the Israelis during the 1973 Yom Kippur War. The film's military advisor, Dale Dye, has written that he negotiated the purchase of the tanks over drinks with Israel Defense Forces officers in a Tel Aviv hotel. The language spoken by the Afghan characters is Pashto. The Pashto dialogue is subtitled but some television screenings have omitted the subtitles.

== Release ==
The film was shown at the Deauville American Film Festival on September 5, 1988 before opening in France two days later.

== Music ==
=== Soundtrack ===
The original soundtrack music was released by CBS/Columbia Records shortly after the movie's debut, written and performed entirely by Mark Isham. The back of the album suggests two tracks ("Badal" and "Nanawatai"), but there are, in fact, ten. Offered in 12-inch LP vinyl, CrO_{2} cassette and DDD-format compact discs. Used CD copies command rather high prices since limited numbers were released in spite of composer Mark Isham's celebrity status.

In addition to the soundtrack, the song Троллейбус ("Trolleybus") by the Russian rock band Kino is heard playing on the radio during a scene. However, Троллейбус was not released until 1983, two years after the events portrayed in the movie. The song was titled Streetcar Headed East in English-speaking countries.

== See also ==
- List of American films of 1988
- List of Asian historical drama films
