= Aishel =

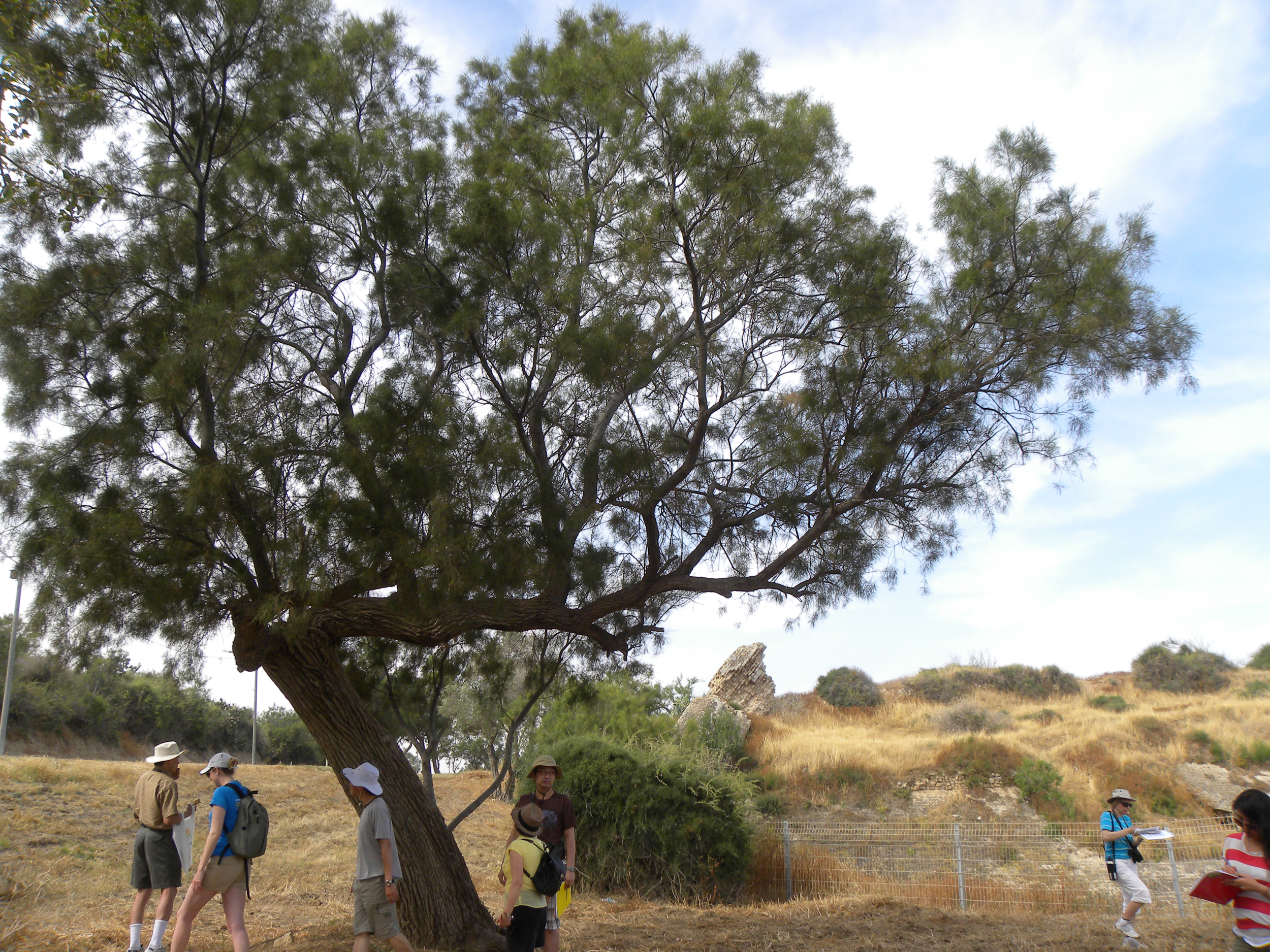
A tamarisk near Ascalon, possibly the biblical aishel

Aishel (or Eshel; אשל ’ešel), is a Hebrew word found in Genesis 21:33. The full passage says, "He [Abraham] planted an aishel in Beer-Sheba, and there he proclaimed the name of God of the Universe."

There are various Talmudic interpretations of the word aishel, but all agree that Abraham's intention was to provide hospitality. Rav understands it to mean an orchard to provide food for wayfarers. Shmuel interprets it as an inn, since the Hebrew letters aishel (aleph, shin, lamed) is an acronym for Achila ("feeding"), Shtiya ("drinking"), and Linah ("lodging").

There are also Christian interpretations, who typically translate the word into English as "grove". Several other translations give 'tamarisk'.
