= Tikriwal =

Pakistan sub-tribe

The Tikriwal or Tekriwal is a geographical name for the Swati sub-tribes of the Tikri Valley, located in the present day Torghar District. They are known for their resistance against British forces in the Hazara Expedition of 1888.
