= Principles of Hospitality Law =

Principles of Hospitality Law (formerly called Principles of Hotel and Catering Law) is a book about hospitality law by Alan Pannett and Michael Boella. Some of the content of the book relates to contract.

== Principles of Hotel and Catering Law ==
The first edition of Principles of Hotel and Catering Law by Alan Pannett was published by Holt, Rinehart and Winston in 1984. The second edition was published by Cassell in 1989. Ruth Mitchell described it as being very clear. The third edition was published in 1992. William J Stewart said that the enactment of Food Safety Act 1990 warranted the publication of this edition.

== Principles of Hospitality Law ==
The first edition of Principles of Hospitality Law by Alan Pannett and Michael Boella was published by Cassell in London in 1996. It is the fourth edition, under a new title, of the book formerly called "Principles of Hotel and Catering Law" by Alan Pannett. The second edition was published in 1999. Nick James described it as "comprehensive" and John Hunter-Jones described it as "engaging and effective".
