= Hospitality law =

Legal or social practice

Hospitality law is a legal and social practice related to the treatment of a person's guests or those who patronize a place of business. Related to the concept of legal liability, hospitality laws are intended to protect both hosts and guests against injury, whether accidental or intentional.

== Duty to guests ==
Hotels and other business operators are expected to "act prudently and use reasonable care" to ensure that their premises are (reasonably) free of risk. While not specifically requiring that a business owner ensure his guests are safe, most jurisdictions interpret 'prudent and reasonable' to include foreseeable dangers, such as tripping hazards or unsecured shelving.

In most cases, unless directly disclaimed (for example, with some insurance waivers), hospitality law does not protect a business owner against charges of negligence.

== Use in common law ==
Common law holds innkeepers liable for any loss of guest property when the guest is on the premises of a place of business; in practice, such liability is often overlooked provided that the business owner meets certain conditions (such as having a guest sign a waiver of liability). In most countries, for liability waivers to be enforceable, notification of the waiver must be posted in an accessible, visible location (usually at the front desk or in a common area of the business), and must be printed in clearly legible text.

American hospitality statutes also govern bailments. A bailment is the "delivery of an item of property, for some purpose, with the expressed or implied understanding that the person receiving it shall return it in the same or similar condition in which it was received, when the purpose has been completed." Coat checks, safety deposit boxes, and luggage storage are common examples of bailments for the hospitality industry.

The Laws of Innkeepers by John E. H. Sherry provides an in-depth analysis of the laws affecting places of public accommodation.

== Literature ==
Books on hospitality law include Hospitality Law (3rd Edition, 1997) by Barth and Barber, and Principles of Hospitality Law by Pannett and Boella.

== See also ==
- Hospitality
- Nanawatai
- Sanctuary
- Grith
- Xenia (Greek)
- Hospitium
