= Hospitality =

Relationship between the guest and the host, or the art or practice of being hospitable

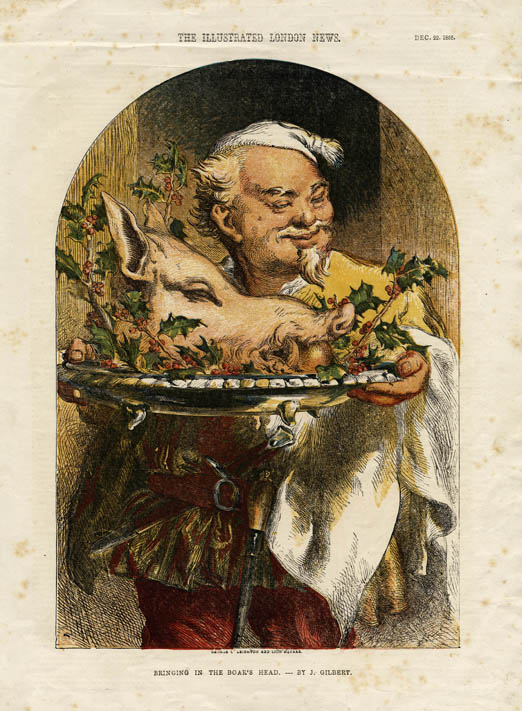
Bringing in the boar's head. In heraldry, the boar's head was sometimes used as symbol of hospitality, often seen as representing the host's willingness to feed guests well. It is likewise the symbol of a number of inns and taverns.

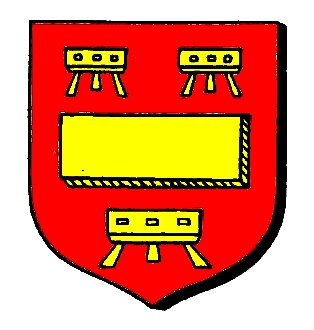
Trestles in the medieval House of Stratford coat of arms: The trestle (also tressle, tressel and threstle) in heraldry is also used to mean hospitality, as historically the trestle was a tripod used both as a stool and a table support at banquets.

Hospitality is the relationship of a host towards a guest, wherein the host receives the guest with some amount of goodwill and welcome. This includes the reception and entertainment of guests, visitors, or strangers. Louis, chevalier de Jaucourt describes hospitality in the Encyclopédie as the virtue of a great soul that cares for the whole universe through the ties of humanity. Hospitality is also the way people treat others, for example in the service of welcoming and receiving guests in hotels. Hospitality plays a role in augmenting or decreasing the volume of sales of an organization.

Hospitality ethics is a discipline that studies this usage of hospitality.

== Etymology ==
"Hospitality" derives from the Latin hospes, meaning "host", "guest", or "stranger". Hospes is formed from hostis, which means "stranger" or "enemy" (the latter being where terms like "hostile" derive). By metonymy, the Latin word hospitalis means a guest-chamber, guest's lodging, an inn. Hospes/hostis is thus the root for the English words host, hospitality, hospice, hostel, and hotel.

== Historical practice ==
In ancient cultures, hospitality involved welcoming the stranger and offering them food, shelter, and safety.

== Global concepts ==
=== Albanians ===
Among Albanians, hospitality (Albanian: mikpritja) is an indissoluble element of their traditional society, also regulated by the Albanian traditional customary law (Kanun). Hospitality, honor, and besa, are the pillars of the northern Albanian tribal society. Numerous foreign visitors have historically documented the hospitality of both northern and southern Albanians. Foreign travelers and diplomats, and a number of renowned historians and anthropologists have, in particular, "solemnized, romanticized, and glorified" the hospitality of the northern Albanian highlanders.

Some reasons that have been provided to explain the admiration of the Albanian hospitality by foreign visitors are: the rituals and forms in which it is expressed; its universal application with uncompromising protection of the guest, even in the case of blood feud (gjakmarrje) between the host and the guest; its central role as a moral principle in Albanian society and individual life, also regulated and sanctified in the Kanun as a basic societal institution; its exceptional altruistic appeal as well as application, conferred with the best available resources, regardless of the fact that the remote, harsh, and geographically inhospitable territory of the northern Albanian mountains is typically scarce in material resources.

The Albanian law of hospitality is simply clarified by the Kanun: "The house of the Albanian belongs to God and the guest." Which means that the guest – who represents the supreme ethical category – has a greater role than the master of the house himself. The guest's role is even more important than blood, because according to custom there is the possibility to pardon the man who spilled the blood of one's father or one's son, but a man who has spilled the blood of a guest cannot ever been pardoned. In Albanian tradition a guest is effectively regarded as a semi-god, admired above all other human relations.

A reflection of the Albanian solemn adherence to their traditional customs of hospitality and besa is notably considered to be their treatment of Jews at the time of the Italian and German occupation during World War II. Indeed, Jews in hiding in Albania were not betrayed or handed over to the Germans by Albanians, and as a result, there were eleven times more Jews at the end of the WWII than at the beginning of it in Albania.

=== Ancient Greece ===
In Ancient Greece, hospitality was a right, with the host being expected to make sure the needs of his guests were met. Conversely, the guest was expected to abide by a set code of behaviour. The ancient Greek term xenia—or theoxenia when a god was involved—expressed this ritualized guest-friendship relation. This relationship was codified in the Homeric epics, and especially in the Odyssey. In Greek society, a person's ability to abide by the laws of hospitality determined nobility and social standing. The ancient Greeks, since the time of Homer, believed that the goddess of hospitality and hearth was Hestia, one of the original six Olympians. A number of myths attest to how those who did not abide by the expectations of xenia, and especially theoxenia, could be treated very brutally by the gods if they saw it as an injustice.

=== Chechens ===
Hospitality is part of the Chechen ethics code Quonahalla, part of 3 codes for Chechens, alongside Adamalla (humanity) and Noxçalla (national moral code). A host (khona) who fails to protect their guest is considered doomed for contempt. Quonahalla includes pleasing to the eye (humanity, purity, respect), pleasing to the heart (charity, dignity, patience etiquette) and the indivisible (respect, honesty, dignity and patience).

=== India and Nepal ===
In India and Nepal, hospitality is based on the principle Atithi Devo Bhava, meaning "the guest is God". This principle is shown in a number of stories where a guest is revealed to be a god who rewards the provider of hospitality. From this stems, the Indian or Nepalese practice of graciousness towards guests at home and in all social situations. The Tirukkuṛaḷ, an ancient Indian work on ethics and morality, explains the ethics of hospitality in verses 81 through 90, dedicating a separate chapter to it (chapter 9).

=== Iran ===
Hospitality has been an "evident characteristic" of Iranian society since ancient times, It is evident in the ancient festivals of Nowruz (the New Year's Day) and Yalda.

The most important aspect of Iranian form of hospitality is taarof, a system of honour norms or an art of etiquette that emphasizes both deference and social rank with linguistic as well as social behavioral components.

Hospitality is a sign of respect and honor towards the guest, but an invitation is expected in return. Iranian hospitality is typically irrespective of the guest's ethnicity or beliefs. Tourists often experience being invited to local people's homes, without anything in return.

=== Judaism ===
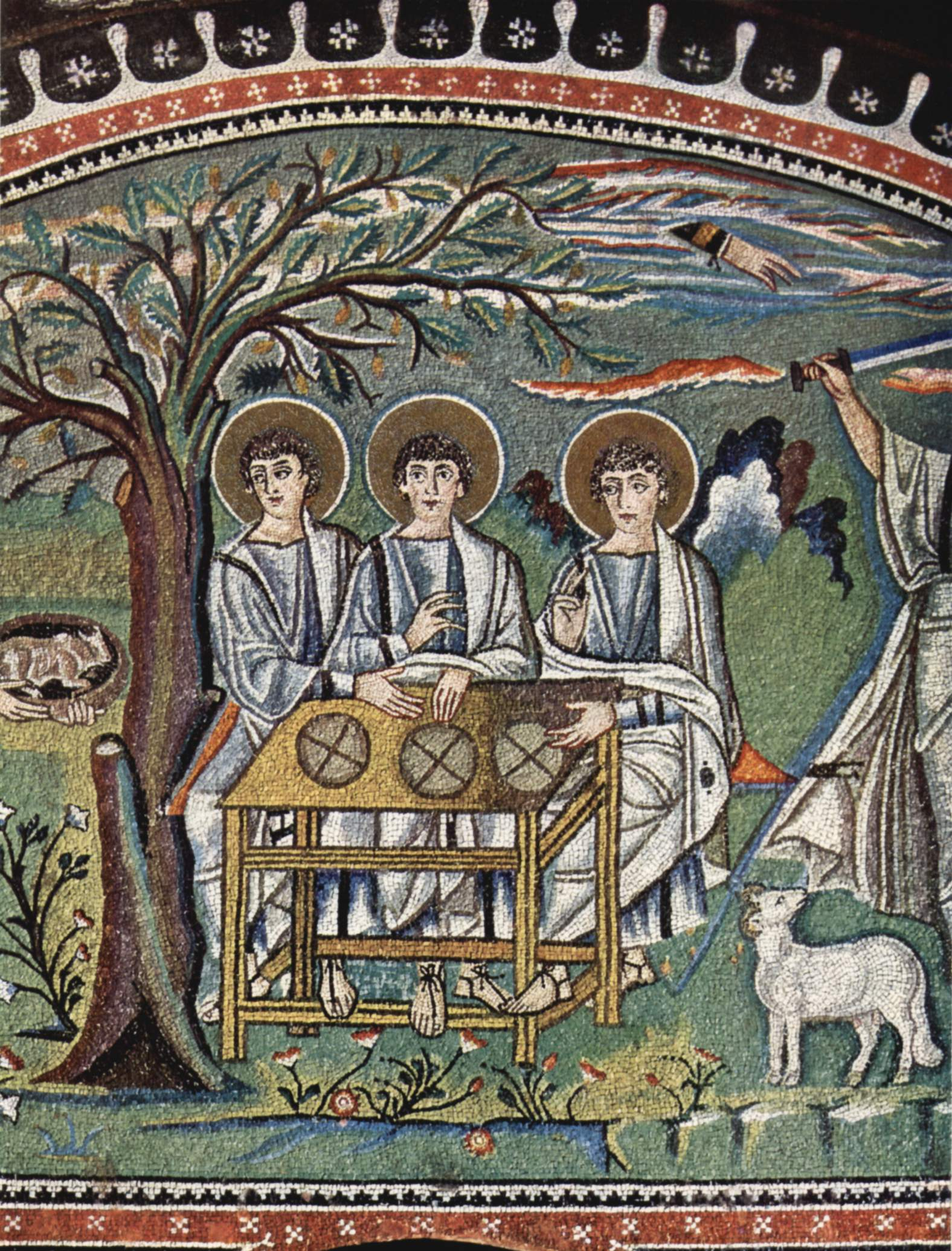
Mosaic at San Vitale, Ravenna, Abraham and the angels, pre-547

Judaism praises hospitality to strangers and guests, based largely on the examples of Abraham and Lot in the Book of Genesis (Genesis 18:1–8 and 19:1–8). Abraham set the standard as providing three things:

- Achila ("feeding")
- Shtiya ("drinking")
- Linah ("lodging")

The initial letters of these Hebrew words spell Aishel (Genesis 21:33). David Hartman interprets a midrash on these verses to claim that hosts who welcome strangers also welcomes to presence of God.

In Hebrew, hospitality is called hachnasat orchim, meaning "welcoming guests." Besides other expectations, hosts are expected to provide nourishment, comfort, and entertainment for their guests, and at the end of the visit, hosts customarily escort their guests out of their home, wishing them a safe journey.

=== Christianity ===
In Christianity, hospitality is a virtue. It is a reminder of sympathy for strangers and a rule to welcome visitors. This is a virtue found in the Old Testament, with, for example, the custom of the foot washing of visitors or the kiss of peace. Jesus taught in the New Testament that those who had welcomed a stranger had welcomed him. He expanded the meaning of brother and neighbor to include the stranger, that he or she be treated with hospitality.

Pope John Paul II wrote: "Welcoming our brothers and sisters with care and willingness must not be limited to extraordinary occasions but must become for all believers a habit of service in their daily lives." He also said, "Only those who have opened their hearts to Christ can offer a hospitality that is never formal or superficial but identified by 'gentleness' and 'reverence'." Some Western countries have developed a host culture for immigrants based on the Bible. In some Christian belief, a guest should never be made to feel that they are causing undue extra labor by their presence.

=== Pashtun ===
One of the main principles of Pashtunwali is Melmastyā́. This is the display of hospitality and profound respect to all visitors (regardless of race, religion, national affiliation, or economic status) without any hope of remuneration or favour. Pashtuns will go to great lengths to show their hospitality.

=== Islam ===
In Islam, there is a strong emphasis on expressing goodwill through the phrase "peace be upon you" or Assalamu Alaikum. This practice is rooted in the teachings of Muhammad. These teachings extend to the treatment of guests and even prisoners of war. Authentic sources and Quranic verses underscore the importance of showing kindness and peace towards these people.

Abu Aziz ibn Umair reported: "I was among the prisoners of war on the day of the battle of Badr. Muhammad had said, 'I enjoin you to treat the captives well.' After I accepted Islam, I was among the Ansar (Inhabitants of Madinah) and when the time of lunch or dinner arrived, I would feed dates to the prisoners for I had been fed bread due to the command of Muhammad."

Invite (all) to the Way of thy Lord with wisdom and beautiful preaching, and argue with them in ways that are best and most gracious.^{[Quran 16:125]}

Good hospitality is crucial in Islam even in business. According to another report, Muhammad passed by a pile of food in the market. He put his hand inside it and felt dampness, although the surface was dry. He said:

"O owner of the food, what is this?"

The man said, "It was damaged by rain, O Messenger of God."

He said, "Why did you not put the rain-damaged food on top so that people could see it! Whoever cheats us is not one of us."

=== Celtic cultures ===
Celtic societies also valued hospitality, especially in terms of protection. A host who granted a person's request for refuge was expected not only to provide food and shelter for guests but also to make sure that they did not come to harm under their care.

== Current usage ==
In the West today hospitality is rarely a matter of protection and survival and is more associated with etiquette and entertainment. However, it still involves showing respect for one's guests, providing for their needs, and treating them as equals. Cultures and subcultures vary in the extent to which one is expected to show hospitality to strangers, as opposed to personal friends or members of one's ingroup.

=== Anthropology of hospitality ===
In anthropology, hospitality has been analyzed as an unequal relation between hosts and guests, mediated through various forms of exchange.

Jacques Derrida offers a model to understand hospitality that divides unconditional hospitality from conditional hospitality. Over the centuries, philosophers have considered the problem of hospitality. To Derrida, there is an implicit hostility in hospitality, as it requires treating a person as a stranger, distancing them from oneself; Derrida labels this intrinsic conflict with the portmanteau "hostipitality". However, hospitality offers a paradoxical situation (like language), since the inclusion of those who are welcomed in the sacred law of hospitality implies that others will be rejected.

Julia Kristeva alerts readers to the dangers of "perverse hospitality", takes advantage of the vulnerability of aliens to dispossess them. Hospitality reduces the tension in the process of host-guest encounters, producing a liminal zone that combines curiosity about others and fear of strangers. Hospitality centres on the belief that strangers should be assisted and protected while traveling. However, some disagree. Anthony Pagden describes how the concept of hospitality was historically manipulated to legitimate the conquest of the Americas by imposing the right of free transit, which was conducive to the formation of the modern nation state. This suggests that hospitality is a political institution, which can be ideologically deformed to oppress others.

== See also ==
- Asylum (antiquity) – Place of refuge in antiquity
- Bread and salt – Greeting ceremony in European and Middle-Eastern cultures
- Hospitality service – Form of hospitality and lodging
- Hospitality law – Legal or social practice
- Hospitium – Greco-Roman hospitality concept
- Hotel manager – Person managing a hotel
- Maître d'hôtel – Manager of the public part of a formal restaurant
- Nanawatai – Pashtun concept of sanctuary at all costs
- Reciprocal altruism – Form of behaviour between organisms
- Reciprocity (social psychology) – Social norm of reciprocating actions
- Reciprocity (cultural anthropology) – Exchange of goods or labour
- Sanctuary – Sacred place
- Southern hospitality – Cultural label of American Southerners as open and hospitable
