= Chesney Gold Medal =

The Chesney Gold Medal is an award given by the Royal United Services Institute awarded to "any especially eminent work calculated to advance the military sciences and knowledge".

== List of Medallists ==
The following people have received the Chesney Gold Medal:

- 1900: Captain Alfred Thayer Mahan USN
- 1907: Major General Sir John Frederick Maurice
- 1909: The Hon J.W. Fortescue
- 1910: Sir John Knox Laughton
- 1911: Professor C.W.C. Oman
- 1913: Colonel Sir Lonsdale Augustus Hale
- 1914: Sir Julian Corbett
- 1919: Major General E.D. Swinton
- 1921: Major General Sir Charles Callwell
- 1924: Professor G.A.R. Callender
- 1925: Captain Sir George Arthur
- 1926: Vice Admiral Sir Herbert Richmond
- 1927: Brigadier-General Sir James E. Edmonds
- 1928: L.G. Carr-Laughton
- 1929: Colonel H.C. Wylly
- 1930: C.E.W. Bean
- 1931: Commander C.N. Robinson
- 1932: Colonel C. de W. Crookshank MP
- 1936: Professor Spenser Wilkinson
- 1950: The Rt Hon Winston Churchill
- 1955: Sir Arthur Bryant
- 1963: Major General J.F.C. Fuller and Captain Basil Liddell Hart
- 1965: Marshal of the Royal Air Force Sir John Slessor
- 1968: Professor Arthur J. Marder
- 1973: Professor Michael Howard
- 1975: Captain Stephen W. Roskill RN
- 1981: John Terraine and Ronald Lewin
- 1985: General Sir John Hackett
- 1991: Correlli Barnett
- 1997: Henry Paget, 7th Marquess of Anglesey
- 2000: Baroness Thatcher
- 2006: Sir Lawrence Freedman
- 2013: General David H. Petraeus
