= Joseph Thackwell =

British Army officer

Lieutenant-General Sir Joseph Thackwell GCB KH
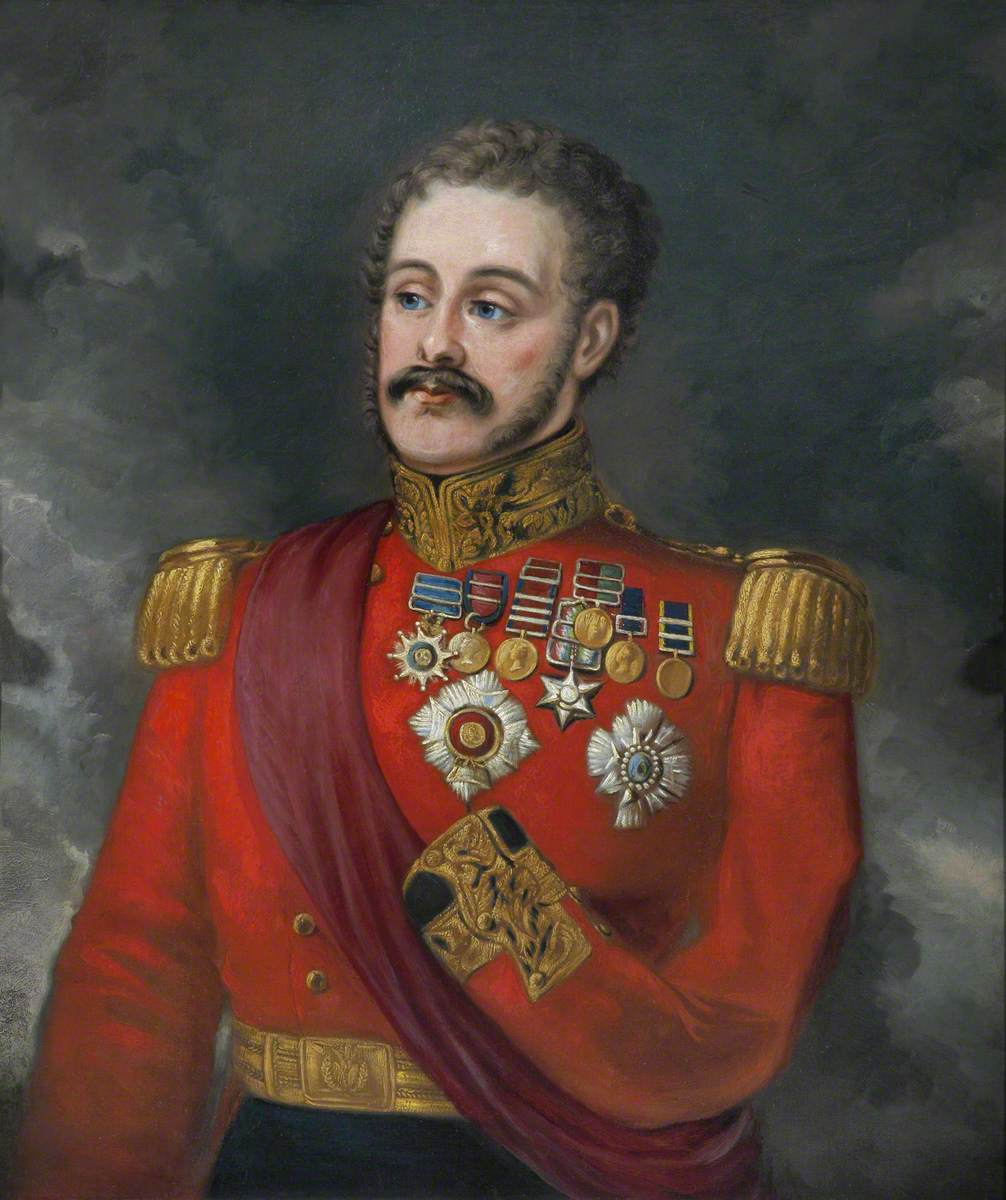
- Portrait by Thomas Harrington Wilson, c. 1846
- Born: 1 February 1781
- Died: 8 April 1859 (aged 78)
- Military career
- Allegiance: United Kingdom
- Branch: British Army
- Rank: Lieutenant-General
- Commands: 15th Hussars
- Conflicts: Napoleonic Wars; Peninsular War; Battle of Sahagún; Battle of Vitoria; Battle of Waterloo; First Anglo-Afghan War; Battle of Sobraon; Second Anglo-Sikh War; Battle of Chillianwala; Battle of Gujrat

Lieutenant-General Sir Joseph Thackwell GCB KH (1 February 1781 – 8 April 1859) was a British Army officer. He served with the 15th Hussars in the Peninsular War at the Battle of Sahagún in 1808 and the Battle of Vitoria in 1813, and he lost his left arm at the Battle of Waterloo in 1815. He commanded the regiment from 1820 to 1832. He then served in India, commanding the cavalry in the First Anglo-Afghan War of 1838–89, and at the Battle of Sobraon in the First Anglo-Sikh War of 1845–46, and at the Battle of Chillianwala and Battle of Gujrat in the Second Anglo-Sikh War of 1848–9. He also commanded the 3rd The King's Own Dragoons, was colonel of the 16th Lancers, and was appointed Inspector-general of cavalry.

== Early life ==
Thackwell was the fourth son of John Thackwell, JP, of Rye Court and Moreton Court, Birtsmorton Court in Worcestershire (died 1808). He was commissioned as cornet in the Worcester Fencible Cavalry in 1798, was promoted to lieutenant in September 1799, and served in Ireland until the regiment was disbanded in 1800.

== 15th Hussars ==
In April 1800, he purchased a commission in the 15th Light Dragoons, and became lieutenant in June 1801. He was placed on half-pay in 1802 after the Peace of Amiens but was brought back to the regiment on its augmentation in April 1804. The regiment was converted into hussars in 1806, and Thackwell became captain in April 1807.

The 15th Hussars formed part of Lord Paget's hussar brigade in 1807, and was sent to the Peninsula in 1808. It played the principal part in the Battle of Sahagún on 21 December 1808, and to cover the retreat of General Sir John Moore's army to Corunna.

After some years of service back in England, the regiment was sent back to the Peninsula in 1813. It formed part of the hussar brigade attached to General Graham's corps. At the passage of the river Esla on 31 May 1813, Thackwell commanded the leading squadron which surprised a French cavalry picket and took thirty prisoners.

He took part in the Battle of Vitoria on 21 June 1813 and in the subsequent pursuit, in the Battle of the Pyrenees at the end of July 1813, and in the Siege of Pamplona. He was also present at the battles of Orthez, Tarbes, and Toulouse. On 1 March 1814, after passing the river Adour, Thackwell was in command of the leading squadron of his regiment, and had a creditable encounter with the French light cavalry, on account of which he was recommended (unsuccessfully) for a brevet majority by Sir Stapleton Cotton. He was awarded the Peninsular Medal with two clasps.

He served with the 15th Hussars in the campaign of 1815, in General Colquhoun Grant's brigade, which was on the right of the line at the Battle of Waterloo. He wrote of his experiences at Waterloo. After several engagements with the French cavalry at Waterloo, the regiment suffered severely in charging a square of infantry towards the end of the day. Thackwell had two horses shot under him and was wounded in his left arm, which was amputated the next day.

He was promoted to the rank of major at Waterloo, and he was made brevet lieutenant-colonel on 21 June 1817. The regiment charged the crowd at the Peterloo massacre on 16 August 1819, at St Peter's Field in Manchester.

He took command of the regiment in June 1820. After serving nearly 32 years in the regiment, and nearly 12 as its commander, he was placed on half-pay on 16 March 1832, exchanging with Lord Brudenell. He was made a Knight of the Royal Guelphic Order (KH) in February 1834.

== India ==
Thackwell became a colonel in the army in January 1837, and in May 1837, by exchange, he took command of the 3rd The King's Own Dragoons, travelling with his new regiment to India and arriving in Calcutta in November 1837.

He became local major-general and was placed in command of the cavalry of the Army of the Indus in the First Anglo-Afghan War of 1838–39. He was present at the Siege of Ghazni, and he commanded the second column of the part of the army which returned to India from Kabul in the autumn of 1839. He was made a Commander of the Order of the Bath (CB) in July 1838, and advanced to KCB in December 1839.

He commanded the cavalry division of Sir Hugh Gough's army in the short campaign against the Marathas of Gwalior at the end of 1843, and was mentioned in Gough's despatch after the Battle of Maharajpur.

In the First Anglo-Sikh War he was again in command of the cavalry at the Battle of Sobraon on 10 February 1846. He led the cavalry in file over the entrenchments on the right of the line, doing work (as Gough said) usually left to infantry and artillery. He was promoted major-general on in November 1846.

When the Second Anglo-Sikh War, Thackwell he was appointed to the command of the third division of infantry; but on the death of Brigadier Cureton in the Battle of Ramnagar on 22 November 1848, he was transferred to the cavalry division. After Ramnagar, the Sikhs crossed to the right bank of the Chenab. To enable his own army to follow them, Gough sent a force of about eight thousand men under Thackwell to pass the river higher up, and help to dislodge the Sikhs from their position by moving on their left flank and rear. Thackwell found the nearer fords impracticable, but crossed at Wazirabad, and encamped on the morning of 3 December near Sadulapur. He had orders not to attack until he was joined by an additional brigade; but he was himself attacked towards midday by about half the Sikh army. The Sikhs drove the British pickets out of three villages and some large plantations of sugar-cane, and so secured for themselves a strong position. They kept up a heavy fire of artillery until sunset, and attempted to turn the British flanks, but there was very little fighting at close quarters. In the course of the afternoon Thackwell received authority to attack if he thought proper; but as the enemy was strongly posted, he deemed it safer to wait till next morning. By morning the Sikhs had disappeared, and it is doubtful whether they had any other object in their attack than that of gaining time for a retreat. Gough expressed his 'warm approval' of Thackwell's conduct, but there are some signs of dissatisfaction in his dispatch of 5 December.

Thackwell also commanded the cavalry at the Battle of Chillianwala on 13 January 1849, split into two brigades, one on each flank, and Thackwell actually directed only the left brigade. The right brigade, commanded by Brigadier Pope, found itself in deep trouble, and the 14th Light Dragoons routed.

At the Battle of Gujrat on 21 February 1849, Thackwell, was also on the left, and kept in check the enemy's cavalry when it tried to turn that flank. After the battle was won he led a vigorous pursuit till nightfall. In his despatch of 26 February 1849 Gough said: ‘I am also greatly indebted to this tried and gallant officer for his valuable assistance and untiring exertions throughout the present and previous operations as second in command with this force.’

Thackwell received the thanks of parliament for the third time, and was advanced to GCB on 5 June 1849.

Based on his diaries and correspondences, his memoir, The Military Memoirs of Lieut.-General Sir Joseph Thackwell was published in 1908, edited by British Army colonel and military historian, H.C. Wylly. Today, his portrait by Thomas Haington Wilson is at National Army Museum, London.

== Later life ==
In November 1849, Thackwell he was given the colonelcy of the 16th Lancers. He was Inspector-general of cavalry from April 1854 to February 1855, and was promoted to lieutenant-general in June 1854. Lord Hastings suggested him for a baronetcy in 1856, but the Prime Minister Lord Palmerston demurred.

He had married, on 29 July 1825, Maria Audriah Roche, eldest daughter of Francis Roche of Rochemount, County Cork (an uncle of Edmond Roche, 1st Baron Fermoy). They had four sons and three daughters. He bought Aghada Hall in County Cork in 1853, and died there in April 1859.

His four sons became officers in the British Army. His second son, Major-General William de Wilton Roche Thackwell (1834–1910), served in the Crimean War and in Egypt in 1882. His third son, Osbert Dabitôt Thackwell (1837–1858), was lieutenant in the 15th Bengal Native Infantry when that regiment mutinied at Nasirabad on 28 May 1857. He had been commissioned as ensign on 25 June 1855, and became lieutenant on 23 November 1856. He was appointed interpreter to the 83rd Foot, was in several engagements with the mutineers, and distinguished himself in the defence of Nimach. He was present at the Siege of Lucknow, and, while walking in the streets after its capture, he was killed in the street by some of the sepoys on 20 March 1858. His fourth son, Francis John Roche Thackwell, served in the Royal Irish Lancers, and died in India in 1869 from wounds inflicted by a tiger.

His nephew Joseph Edwin Thackwell, CB (1813–1900) also served in the British Army, serving as Aide-de-Camp to his uncle when commanding the Meerut Division in India in 1852–53; he also served in the Crimean War, and also became a lieutenant general.

== Works ==
- H.C. Wylly (1908). The Military Memoirs of Lieut.-General Sir Joseph Thackwell: Based on diaries and correspondence (Online Text). John Murray, London.
