= Ronald Lewin =

British officer, publishing editor, radio producer and military historian

George Ronald Lewin CBE (11 October 1914 – 6 January 1984), later known as Ronald Lewin, was a British officer, publishing editor, radio producer and military historian.

== Education ==
Lewin attended University of Oxford at The Queens College on an academic scholarship in 1932, having earned both the Hastings Scholar award and the Goldsmiths’ Exhibitioner award in Classics and Divinity. While there he earned a double first in classical literature, history and philosophy. His love of English literature endured throughout his life.

== Career ==
Following his graduation in 1937, Lewin worked as an editorial assistant with the British publishing house of Jonathan Cape Limited. With the start of the Second World War in 1939, he joined the British Army serving as an officer in the Royal Artillery. In North Africa he served under Montgomery and was wounded at El Alamein. He returned to his field post and served with distinction in North Africa and Europe until the close of the war.

Returning to England in 1946, he worked in the BBC Home Service, initially as a producer. He was made chief of the BBC's domestic service in 1957 and remained at that position until his retirement from the BBC in 1965. In 1966 he returned to publishing and was made editor at Hutchinson Publishing. He served in that capacity until 1969.

== Military historian ==
Lewin did not begin writing books until the age of 54. He wrote ten books during his lifetime and was working on a one-volume history of World War II at the time of his death. His best-known book was Ultra Goes to War, an account written on the cipher breaking by which the Allies intercepted and broke the coded messages that the Germans transmitted by radio during World War II. His work on Ultra was the first to be based on official documents of the intelligence operation.

Writing in a foreword to a book by Lewin, historian Max Hastings said "He quickly established a reputation as one of the major military writers of his generation." He went on to say "His biography of Slim was outstanding. His assessments of Churchill, Montgomery and Rommel at war are essential reading for students of the period." Lewin's biography of William Slim, titled Slim the Standard-Bearer, received the WH Smith Literary Award.

In his reassessment of Rommel, University of Salford's Alaric Searle grouped Lewin's biography of Rommel with those of other former serving officers Desmond Young, Martin Blumenson, Kenneth Macksey, David Fraser and several others, whose work he dismissed as "effusive and often uncritical". Searle asserted these works were part of a group of writings that created a Rommel legend, a view that the Field Marshal was an apolitical, brilliant commander and a victim of the Third Reich due to his presumed participation in the 20 July plot to kill Adolf Hitler.

== Awards ==
Lewin was elected a fellow of the Royal Society of Literature in 1977 and of the Royal Historical Society in 1980. He was awarded the Chesney Gold Medal of the Royal United Services Institute in 1982.

== Bibliography ==
- Rommel as Military Commander (1968), ISBN 9781844150403
- Montgomery as Military Commander (1971), ISBN 9780713412086
- The War on Land, 1939–1945: an anthology of personal experience (1969), ISBN 0090981707
- Churchill as Warlord (1973), ISBN 9780713412154
- Slim, the Standard Bearer: a biography of Field-Marshal the Viscount Slim (1976), ISBN 0850522188
- Man of Armour: a study of Lieut-General Vyvyan Pope and the development of armoured warfare (1976) ISBN 0-85052-050-9
- The Life and Death of the Afrika Korps: a biography (1977), ISBN 9780713406856
- Ultra Goes to War: the secret story (1978), ISBN 9780091344207
- The Chief: Field Marshal Lord Wavell, Commander-in-Chief and Viceroy, 1939–1947 (1980), ISBN 009142500X
- The Other Ultra: codes, ciphers, and the defeat of Japan (1982), ISBN 9780091474706 (published in USA as The American Magic: codes, ciphers, and the defeat of Japan)
- Hitler's Mistakes (1984), ISBN 9780436245626
