= Frederick Mackeson =

- Born: 2 September 1807; Hythe, Kent, United Kingdom
- Died: 14 September 1853 (aged 46); Peshawar, British India
- Burial place: Khalid Bin Waleed Park, Peshawar
- Military career
- Allegiance: East India Company
- Branch: Bengal army
- Service years: 1825-1853
- Rank: Lieutenant-Colonel
- Unit: Bengal Native Infantry
- Conflicts: First Anglo-Afghan War; First Anglo-Sikh War; Second Anglo-Sikh War

Lieutenant colonel Frederick Mackeson CB (2 September 1807 – 14 September 1853) was an East India Company officer operating in the North West Frontier of British India and one of Henry Lawrence's "Young Men".

== Life ==
He was born in Hythe, Kent to William and Harriett Mackeson. He studied at the King's School, Canterbury and in France, before joining the Bengal Native Infantry in 1825. He was made Lieutenant in 1828, and in 1831 transferred to Ludhiana where he would be based for several years. In 1832, he was appointed assistant political agent at Ludhiana and in that capacity accompanied Claude Martin Wade on a Mission to Lahore and Bahawalpur in connection with the Indus navigation scheme. In 1837 he accompanied Sir Alexander Burnes to Kabul.

In 1838, he was sent to Peshawar tasked with winning local support for Shuja Shah Durrani's attempt to return to power in Afghanistan. He remained in Peshawar throughout the First Anglo-Afghan War responsible for forwarding supplies and money to Sir Robert Sale in Jalalabad, hastening up reinforcements and maintaining British influence in the Khyber region. Mackeson's reputation was enhanced by the war, and a colleague Henry Lawrence described him as an "excellent officer, first-rate linguist, a man of such temper that no native would disturb and of untiring energy" he noted that "his life was spent in discoursing night and day with false Sikhs and Khyberees at Peshawar, and treading almost alone, or attended by Afghan escort, the paths of the Khyber". After the final withdrawal of British troops from Afghanistan in 1842, he was appointed acting Superintendent of Buttee, and later assistant to the political agents in Rajpootana and at Delhi.

During the First Anglo-Sikh War Mackeson served under Harry Smith and was present at the Battle of Aliwal. However, after the war when the prestigious position of British Resident to Lahore became available, he was overlooked in favour of Henry Lawrence, who lacked Mackeson's first hand frontier experience. In March 1846, Lord Harding appointed him Superintendent of the Cis-Sutlej territory in the Punjab, an area outside of Lawrence's domain. In the Second Anglo-Sikh War he served as aide to Lord Gough through which he gained the praise of both Lord Gough, and the Governor General Lord Dalhousie. After the Battle of Chillianwala, he swam the treacherous Jhelum River to notify Brigadier Burn's brigade on the other side of the river bank of the danger of an imminent Sikh force, in turn saving the brigade. In 1849 he was made a local Lieutenant-Colonel.

In 1850, Lord Dalhousie selected him, along with his nephew Captain Ramsay, to safely escort the Koh-i-Noor diamond to Britain. The jewel had been ceded to the East India Company in the Treaty of Lahore at the conclusion of the Second Anglo-Sikh War, and was to be presented to Queen Victoria as a gift from the Company. The pair left Bombay on 6 April 1850 on board the steamship Medea captained by William Lockyear and arrived at Portsmouth on 30 June. The voyage was full of hazards, when first an outbreak of cholera and later a devastating gale threatened to destroy all on board. On their arrival in Portsmouth, Mackeson and Ramsay were escorted to the East India Company's headquarters, East India House in Leadenhall Street, where they safely handed the jewel over to Company chairman, John Shepherd.

Mackeson returned to India in 1851, and being then senior captain of his regiment and a brevet Lieutenant-Colonel, he was appointed Deputy Commissioner at Peshawar. For the next two years Mackeson was asked to pacify the frontier tribes, amid fears that subversive Wahhabi agents had been supporting local insurrection. In 1852 he took part in operations against the Yusufzai clans in the Black Mountain region. Two British officers of the Customs department had been hacked to death by a gang of Hassanzais, a Yusufzai clan in the region. The offending clan was threatened with punitive action if they did not hand over the killers, however they refused to surrender the culprits and seized two local forts instead. The Government assembled an expeditionary force under Mackeson's command, including columns led by Robert Napier and James Abbott, which successfully retook the forts.

On 10 September 1853 while listening to appeals in his veranda, he was greeted with a low salaam and presented with a piece of paper by a religious fanatic from Swat who proceeded to stab him with a large knife. Mackeson died four days later on 14 September 1853. It was generally understood that a price had been set on Mackeson's head, although the government denied that was the case. His assassin was tried, and on 1 October 1853 was hanged. By the advice of John Lawrence the murderer's body was burned after it was cut down, and the ashes thrown into a running stream.

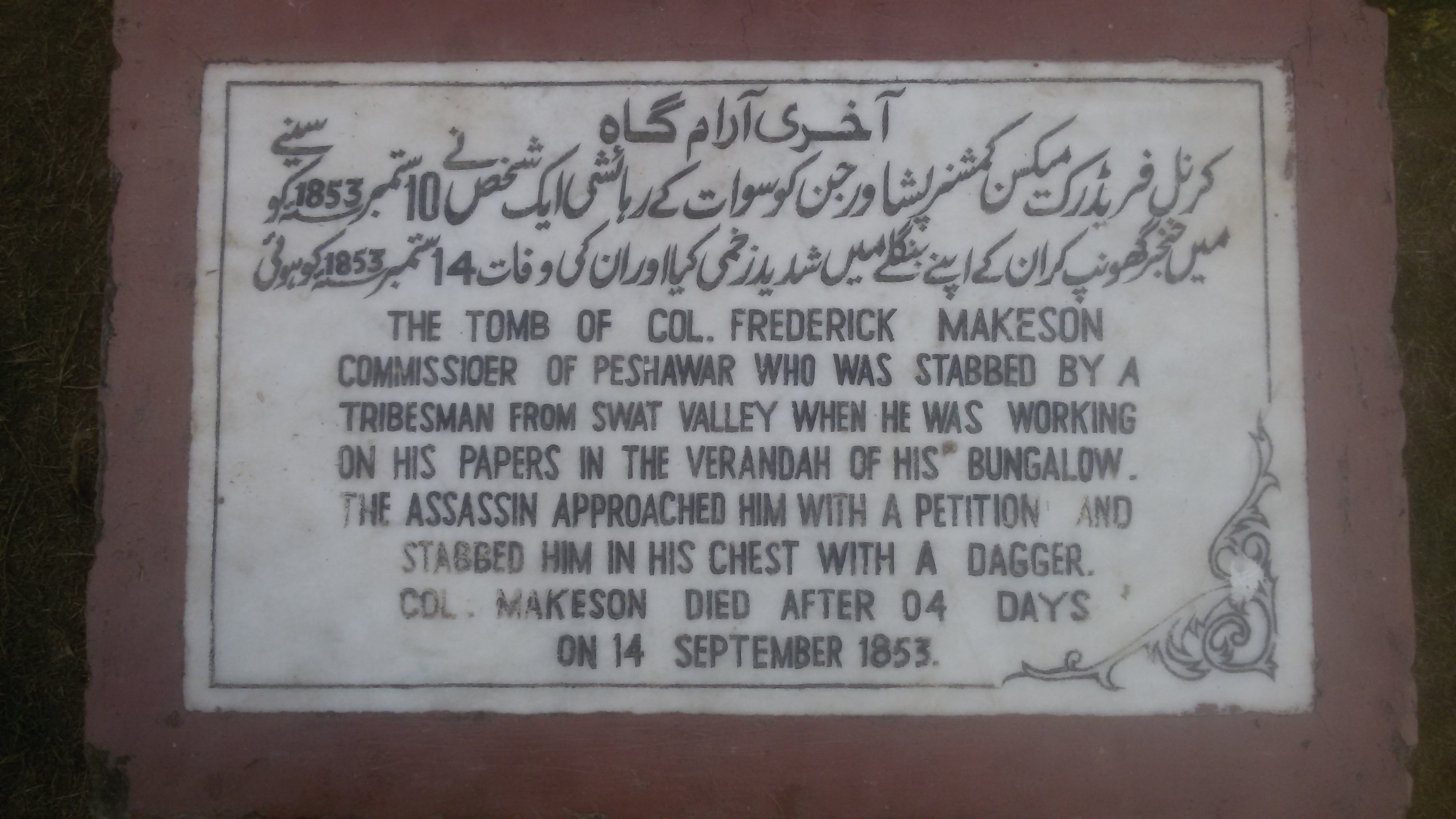
Frederick Mackeson tomb plate

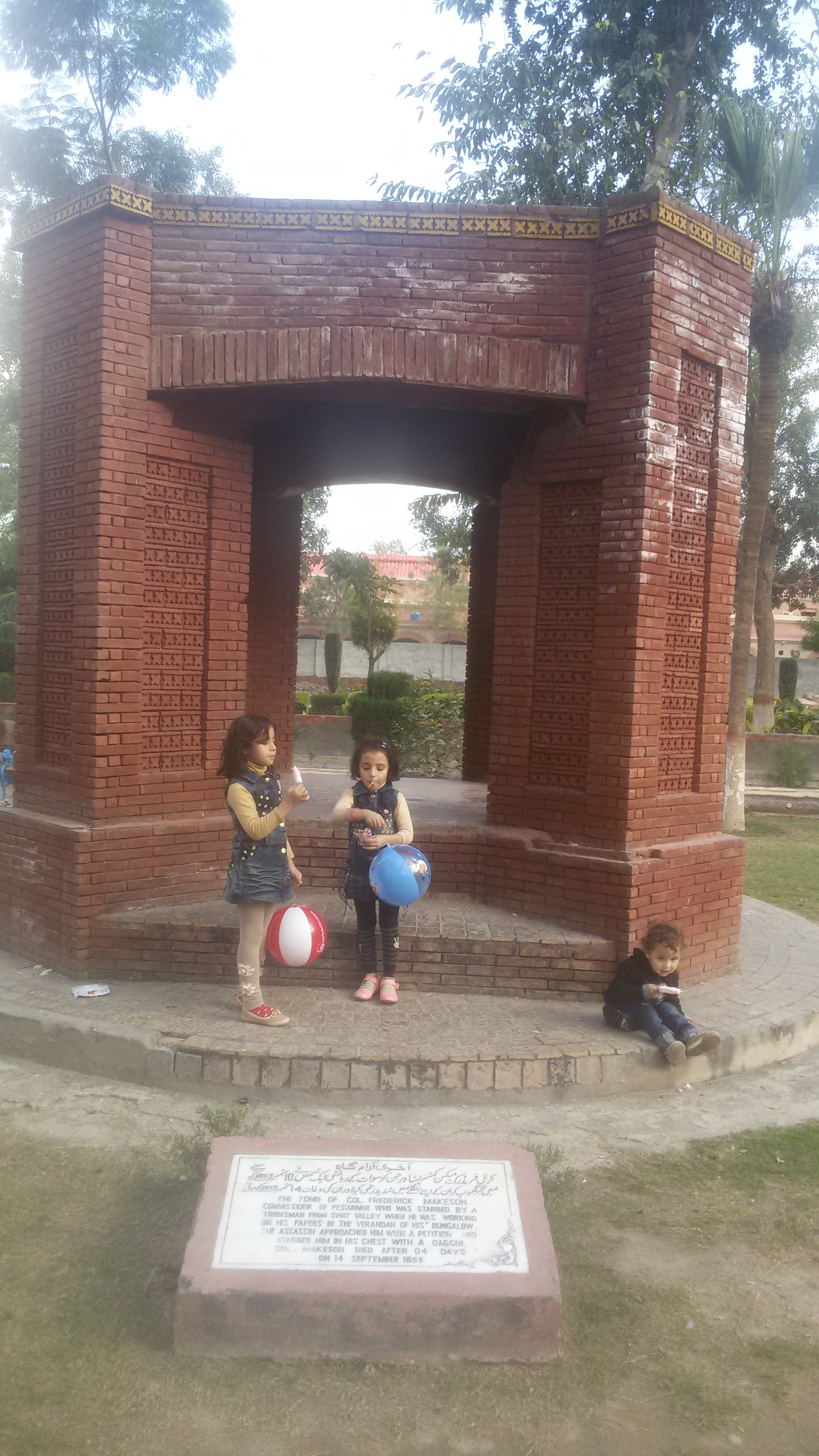
Frederick Mackeson Tomb in Peshawar, KP, Pakistan

== Legacy ==
Frederick Mackeson was buried in Khalid Bin Waleed Garden in Peshawar. A monument was erected in his memory within the Peshawar Cantonment paid for by his friends.

The lasting legacy of Mackeson's influence around Peshawar can be noted by the words of Robert Warburton, himself a frontiersmen in the region over twenty five years later:

"Wherever I have been, in every part of the Peshawar district, in the Khyber range, the name of Mackeson has been honoured and respected by all the residents of those lands above that of any other Englishmen who has been on the Peshawar border."

There is a large memorial plaque in Canterbury Cathedral, "erected to his memory by his friends and admirers in India".

He was known by locals by the name Kishin Kaka – Kishin being a corruption of his surname Mackeson.

== See also ==
- Henry Lawrence's "Young Men"
