= Torghar District =

District in Khyber Pakhtunkhwa, Pakistan

Torghar District ضلع تورغر تور غر ولسوالۍ Kala Dhaka District ضلع کالا ڈهاکہ کالا ډاکه ولسوالۍ
- District of Khyber Pakhtunkhwa
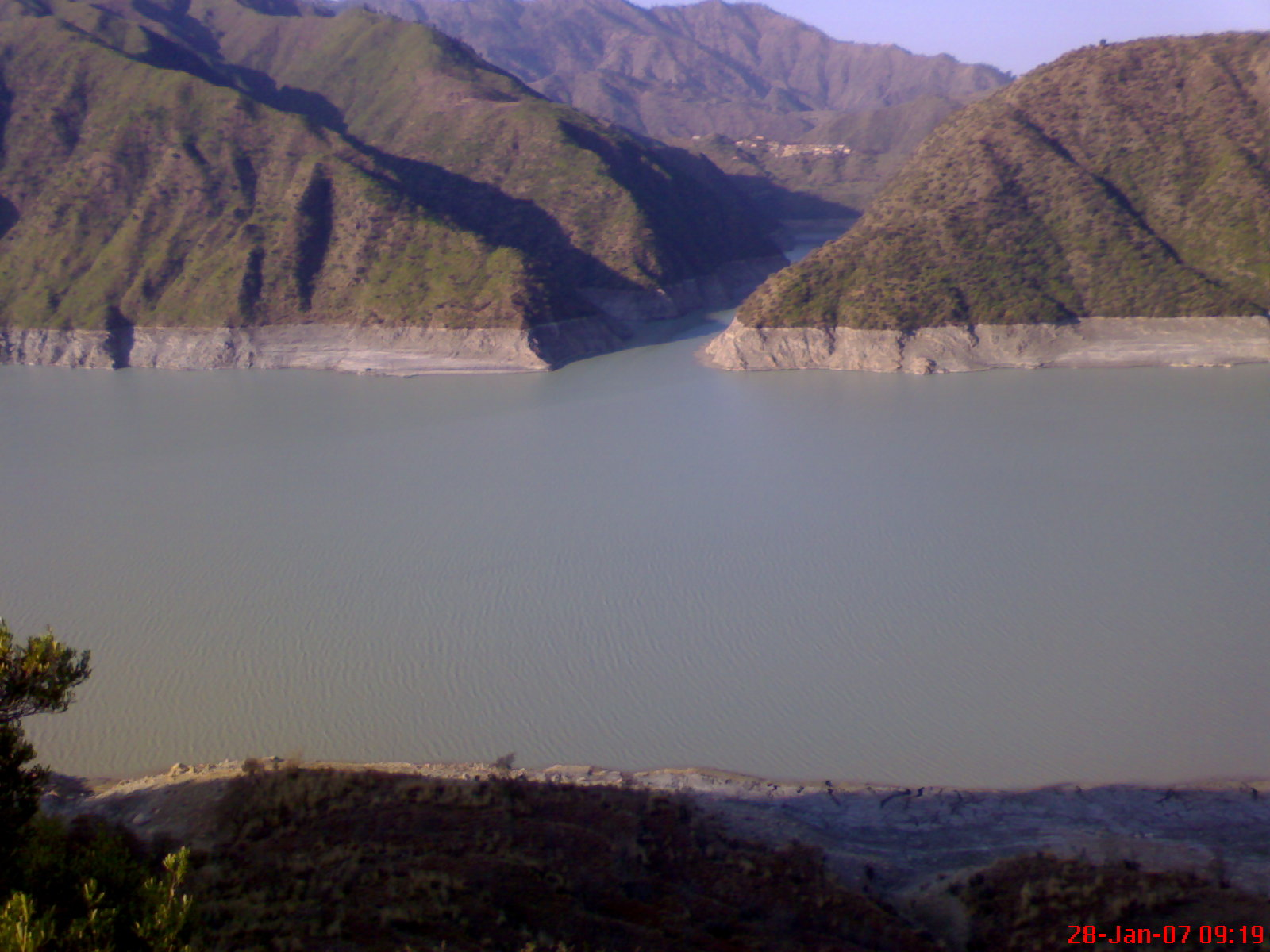
- Confluence of the Indus and Barndo Rivers

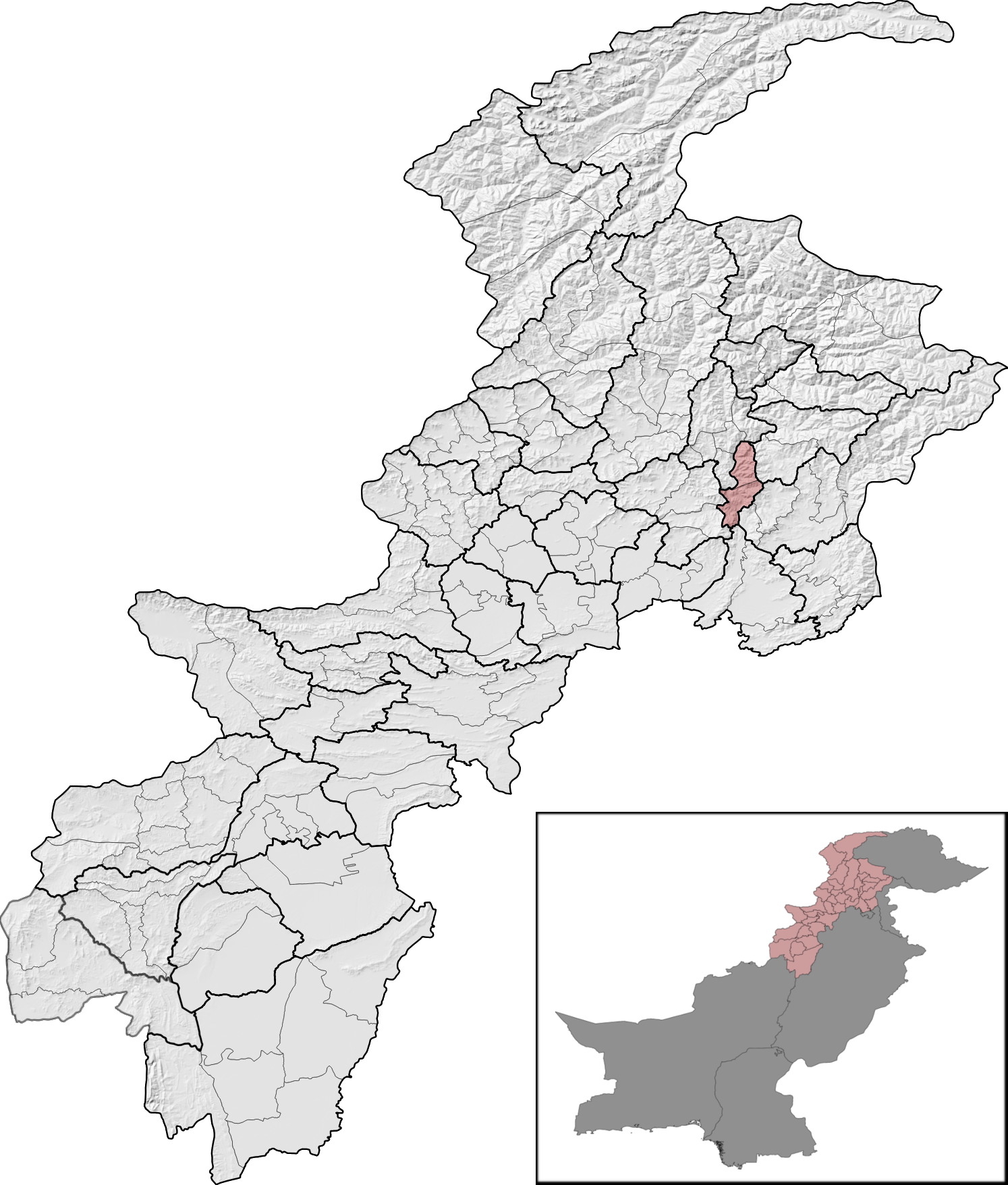
- Torghar District (red) in Khyber Pakhtunkhwa
- Coordinates: 34°36′49″N 72°47′18″E
- Country: Pakistan
- Province: Khyber Pakhtunkhwa
- Division: Hazara
- Established: 2011
- Headquarters: Judba

Government
  - Type: District Administration
  - Deputy Commissioner: Zia-ur-Rehman Marwat
  - District Police Officer: N/A
  - District Health Officer: N/A

Area
  - District of Khyber Pakhtunkhwa: 497 km^{2} (192 sq mi)

Population (2023)
  - District of Khyber Pakhtunkhwa: 200,445
  - Density: 403/km^{2} (1,040/sq mi)
  - Urban: 0 (0%)
  - Rural: 200,445 (100%)

Literacy
  - Literacy rate: Total: (29.74%); Male: (46.58%); Female: (12.46%)
- Time zone: UTC+5 (PST)
- Number of Tehsils: 3
- Website: torghar.kp.gov.pk

Torghar District (Pashto: تور غر ولسوالۍ, Hindko: کالا ڈهاکہ, Urdu: ضلع تورغر, English: Black Mountain) formerly known as Kala Dhaka is a district in the Hazara Division of the Khyber Pakhtunkhwa province of Pakistan. It was officially separated from Mansehra District in 2011 under Article 246 of the Constitution of the Islamic Republic of Pakistan.

== Etymology ==
The name Torghar takes its root from the Pashto words Tor (تور) and Ghar (غار), which would come to mean "dark mountain".

== History ==
By 1849, the British had established their control over the entire region of Hazara. The British responded with numerous expeditions to quell these uprisings, a series of campaigns lasting from 1852 to the 1920s.

The Hazara Expedition of 1888, also known as the Black Mountain Expedition or the First Hazara Expedition, was a military campaign by the British against the tribes of Tor Ghar.

On 18 June 1888, two British officers and four Gurkha soldiers were killed in an altercation between the British reconnaissance patrols and the local tribes. As a response, the Hazara Field Force was assembled and began its march on 4 October 1888, after an ultimatum had not been satisfied by the tribes by 2 October 1888. The first phase of the campaign ended with the Hassanzai and Akazai tribes requesting an armistice on 19 October 1888. The second phase of the campaign targeted the Swati tribe that lived north of the Black Mountain such as the Allaiwals, the Parari Sayyids and the Tikariwals. The campaign ended when the Allaiwal village of Pokal was occupied and destroyed by the British on November 2 and 3, 1888.

The then Commander in Chief of India General Sir Frederick Roberts viewed the Black Mountain Expedition as:

a success from a military point of view, but ... the determination of the Punjab Government to limit the sphere of action of the troops, and to hurry out of the country, prevented our reaping any political advantage. We lost a grand opportunity for gaining control over this lawless and troublesome district; no survey was made, no roads opened out, the tribesmen were not made to feel our power, and, consequently, very soon another costly expedition had to be undertaken.

The failure of the tribes to honour the agreements that ended the 1888 campaign led to a further two-month expedition by a Hazara Field Force in 1891. General Roberts observed that

the Black Mountain tribes, [having been] quite unsubdued by the fruitless expedition of 1888, had given trouble almost immediately afterwards. [The second expedition] was completely successful in political results as in its military conduct. The columns were not withdrawn until the tribesmen had become convinced that they were powerless to sustain a hostile attitude towards us, and that it was in their interest, as it was our wish, that they should henceforth be on amicable terms with us.

British and Indian Army forces who participated in these expeditions received the India General Service Medal with the clasps Hazara 1888 and Hazara 1891 respectively.

=== 2005 earthquake ===
Torghar was severely affected by the Kashmir earthquake in 2005. According to a report in Time magazine: "Entire villages were devastated; in an instant, stone houses turned into burial mounds. The Indus river, flowing at the bottom of the valleys, recalls one tribal elder, Mohammed Said, "looked like water boiling inside a tea kettle".

== Demographics ==
=== Population ===
Historical population
Year	Pop.	±% p.a.
1951	142,599	—
1961	151,718	+0.62%
1972	195,580	+2.34%
1981	83,927	−8.97%
1998	174,682	+4.41%
2017	171,395	−0.10%
2023	200,445	+2.64%

As of the 2023 census, Torghar district had 29,410 households, a population of 200,445, a sex ratio of 103.95 males to 100 females, and a literacy rate of 29.74%: 46.58% for males and 12.46% for females. 67,474 (33.66% of the surveyed population) are under 10 years of age. The entire population lives in rural areas. 287 (0.14%) people in the district are from religious minorities, nearly all Christians.

=== Ethnic groups ===
Gujjars and Pashtuns are two major ethnic groups in the Torghar district. The eastern parts of Torghar (black mountain) is mainly inhabited by the Gurjars and western parts are inhabited by the Pashtun tribes (Madakhel, Hasanzai, Akazai, Nusratkhel, Basikhel). Some Hindko-speaking tribes also found in the district.

=== Language ===
Languages of Torghar District (2023)
1. Pashto (96.8%)
2. Hindko (2.29%)
3. Others (0.86%)

At the time of the 2023 census, 96.85% of the population spoke Pashto and 2.29% Hindko as their first language.

== Geography ==
The district lies between 34°19'29N to 34°46'8"N, and 72°43'2E to 72°56'24E. It is bounded on the east by Agror and on the south by Tanawal; to the west it is bounded by Buner, to the northeast it borders with Battagram. The range has a length of 40 kilometres (25 mi) to 48 kilometres (30 mi) from north to south and an elevation of 2,400 metres (8,000 ft) above sea level. This area has also been called Chagharzai, because of adjoining Chagharzai areas of Buner District. Opposite Kala Dhaka (officially 'Kala Dhaka' has been renamed 'Tor Ghar'), across the Indus River is Shangla District, mainly the area belonging to Tehsil Martung.

== Administration ==
Torghar district covers an area of 497 km^{2} (25,8125 acres) and is divided into 16 Union Councils, grouped in these Tehsils:

Tehsil	Name (Urdu) (Pashto)	Area (km^{2})	Pop. (2023)	Density (ppl/km^{2}) (2023)	Literacy rate (2023)	Union Councils
Daur Maira Tehsil		86	50,503	587.24	25.92%	
Judba Tehsil	(Urdu: تحصیل جدبا)(Pashto: جدبا تحصیل)	63	63,083	1,001.32	19.78%	
Khander Hassanzai Tehsil	(Urdu: تحصیل خاندر)(Pashto: خاندر تحصیل)	305	86,859	284.78	38.66%	

== Provincial assembly ==
The district is represented by one elected MPA in the provincial assembly who represent the following constituency:

- PK-58 (Tor Ghar)

The MPA between 2013 and 2018 was Zareen Gul. He has been elected six times as MPA and senior most politician in KP Assembly.

Member of Provincial Assembly	Party affiliation	Constituency	Year
Laiq Muhammad Khan Swati	Awami National Party	PK-35 Tor Ghar	2018

Member of Provincial Assembly	Party affiliation	Constituency	Year
Laiq Muhammad Khan Swati	Independent (Joined PTI after election)	PK-41 Tor Ghar	2024

== See also ==
- Districts of Pakistan
  - Districts of Khyber Pakhtunkhwa
  - Districts of Punjab, Pakistan
  - Districts of Balochistan, Pakistan
  - Districts of Sindh, Pakistan
  - Districts of Azad Kashmir
  - Districts of Gilgit-Baltistan
- Divisions of Pakistan
  - Divisions of Balochistan
  - Divisions of Khyber Pakhtunkhwa
  - Divisions of Punjab, Pakistan
  - Divisions of Sindh
  - Divisions of Azad Kashmir
  - Divisions of Gilgit-Baltistan
