= Judba =

Judba جدبا
- District Headquarter / City
- Location within Khyber Pakhtunkhwa Location within Pakistan
- Coordinates: 34°36′49″N 72°47′20″E
- Country: Pakistan
- Province: Khyber Pakhtunkhwa
- District: Torghar
- Elevation: 1,088 m (3,570 ft)
- Time zone: UTC+5 (PST)

Judba (Urdu and Pashto: جدبا) is the district headquarters of Torghar District, Khyber Pakhtunkhwa, Pakistan.
