= H. C. Wylly =

British Army colonel and military historian

Harold Carmichael Wylly
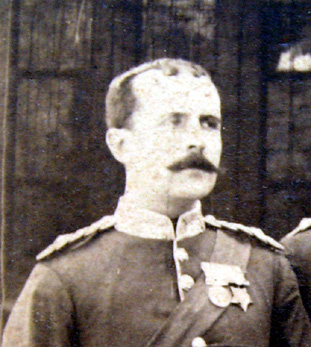
- Born: 18 January 1858; Meerut, British India
- Died: 3 September 1932 (aged 74)
- Service years: 1887–1907
- Rank: Colonel

Colonel Harold Carmichael Wylly, CB (18 January 1858 – 3 September 1932) was a British Army colonel and military historian.

== Life ==
Wylly was born in Meerut in the North West Province of British India, the son of E. M. Wylly, a judge in the High Court of Agra. He was educated at Henley Grammar School, Wimbledon School and the Royal Military College, Sandhurst, before embarking on a career as an army officer when he was commissioned a lieutenant on 11 September 1878, serving first with the 95th (Derbyshire) Regiment of Foot, which in 1881 was merged into the Sherwood Foresters, as the 2nd battalion (Derbyshire Regiment). He served in the Anglo-Egyptian War in 1882, was promoted to captain on 1 May 1884, served in the Sikkim Expedition in 1888, was promoted to major on 26 May 1893, and served in the Tirah Campaign 1897–98. In February 1900 he joined his battalion when it transferred to Malta. Following the outbreak of the Second Boer War, the 1st battalion of his regiment had embarked for South Africa in November 1899. Leaving his own battalion at Malta, Wylly transferred to South Africa where he was promoted to lieutenant-colonel in command of the 1st battalion from 11 February 1900. For services during the war, he was mentioned in despatches (dated 8 April 1902) and appointed a Companion of the Order of the Bath (CB) in the South Africa honours list published on 26 June 1902. The battalion stayed in South Africa until after the war, then transferred on the SS Wakool to a new posting at Hong Kong in September 1902.

From 1907 Wylly published works on military topics, including in 1908 a biography of Sir Joseph Thackwell. In 1913, in the buildup to the First World War, Wylly became editor of RUSI Journal, the journal of the Royal United Services Institute, a position he held until 1923. Many of his later works dealt with the First World War. In 1929, he was awarded the Chesney Gold Medal, the highest award of the Royal United Services Institute.

== Works ==
- Davis, John, and H. C. Wylly (1895) The History of the Second, Queen's Royal Regiment, Now the Queen's (Royal West Surrey) Regiment: From 1715 to 1799. (R.Bentley & son).
- Davis, John; Wylly, Harold Carmichael; Foster, R. C. G. (1906). The History of the Second Queen's Royal Regiment. Vol. 5. R. Bentley & Son.
- Wylly, Col H. C. (1908). The Military Memoirs of Lieut.-General Sir Joseph Thackwell: Based on diaries and correspondence (online Text). John Murray, London.
- Wylly, Col H.C. (1912). "From the Black Mountain to Waziristan". London, Macmillan.
- Wylly, Col H.C. (1914). XVth (the King's) Hussars 1759 to 1913. Caxton.
- Wylly, Col H. C. (1924). The Border regiment in the great war. Gale & Polden.
- Wylly, Col H. C. (1926). History of the King's Own Yorkshire Light Infantry Vol I, from 1755 to 1914. P. Lund, Humphries & Co.
- Wylly, Col H. C. (1929). History of the 5th Battalion, 13th Frontier Forces Rifles, 1849–1926. Gale and Polden.
- H. C. Wylly (1930). The History of Coke's Rifles. Gale & Polden.
- Wylly, Col H. C. Neill's Blue Caps. Vol. 3: 1914 – 1922. Uckfield: Naval & Military Press. ISBN 1845744098.
- Wylly, Col H. C. (1933). The Loyal North Lancashire Regiment. Vol. 2: 1914 – 1918. London: The Royal United Service Institution. ISBN 9781530467426.
- Neill's 'Blue Caps Vol I & II 1826–1914
- History of the Queen's Royal Regiment, Gale & Polden 1925.
