= Nanawatai =

Pashtun concept of sanctuary at all costs

Nənawā́te (Pashto: ننواتې, "sanctuary") is a tenet of the Pashtunwali code of the Pashtun people. It allows a beleaguered person to enter the house of any other person and make a request of him which cannot be refused, even at the cost of the host's own life or fortune. A similar code of conduct is used by the neighbouring Baluch people.

Traditionally it is used to refer to a request for sanctuary, whereby the host must be willing to fight or die for the sake of anyone who comes knocking at his door seeking refuge, even if it is a sworn enemy.

As the burden of sanctuary and protection extends even to fighting against government troops on behalf of the person seeking refuge, some have suggested that Mullah Omar's refusal to turn in Osama bin Laden was due only to his having availed himself of Nənawā́te.

== Usage ==
By invoking Nənawā́te one is said to "seize the skirt" (lamә́n niwә́l) of his new protector, and the other party is obligated to extend peace and acquiesce to grant shelter and protection, when someone has placed themselves in harm's way in this fashion.

Traditionally, the burden of protection exists only insofar as the one pleading clemency stays within the property of the protector; if one leaves the company of the protector, the responsibility vanishes and even the protector can attack him. Often, the one pleading for sanctuary would be made to first humiliate himself, perhaps wearing a halter made of grass around his neck, to demonstrate that he was entirely supplicant to his host.

== Examples ==
Nənawā́te can typically be used to force a victim, or victim's family, to forgive a transgressor and offer their protection to the repentant aggressor. However, in cases of rape and adultery, the guilty party cannot request sanctuary, and must flee or submit willingly to the prescribed punishment. Sources are divided on whether those who elope can request such protection.

In one example, a woman was sheltering two robbers when their pursuers came to her and told her that the men she was sheltering had killed her son. She replied "That may be so, but they have come Nənawā́te to my house and I cannot see any one laying his hands on them so long as they are under my roof". Deputy Minister for Tribal Affairs Mohammed Omar Barakzai recounted the time that another woman was greeted at her door in Saidkhail by a transient student who had just stabbed her son and requested sanctuary; and she told her husband and brothers that he must be given refuge, and taken to safety outside the city.

In a counter-example, the Utmanzai tribe decided to pay a visit to the house of the Governor of the North-West Frontier Province, Owais Ahmed Ghani. Once they arrived, they impressed upon him a Nənawā́te obligation to give them anything they demanded, and he acquiesced to re-instate the salaries of 5,000 local tribal police whose payments he had suspended ten months earlier following a refusal to work after Taliban threats.

== In popular culture ==
In 1986, after witnessing a team of mujahideen capture and execute a Soviet tank crew, William Mastrosimone wrote a stage play entitled Nənawā́te, about a tank driver captured during the Soviet–Afghan War and his resulting plea for sanctuary from those who find him. The story was later adapted into the 1988 action film The Beast of War.

Norwegian composer Håkon Berge wrote an instrumental piece, for drums and brass pipes, titled Nənawā́te.

== Similar ==
In centuries past, the Highland Clans of Scotland honoured a similar code of hospitality and protection. This is evinced in the story of the Lamonts and MacGregors.

== See also ==
- Hospitality law
- Melmastya
- Hospitium
