= Melmastya =

Requirement of hospitality on tribesmen in Pashtunwali

Melmastyā́, or hospitality, is the requirement Pashtunwali places on all its tribesmen towards others, whether they are strangers or members of one's own tribe. Melmastyā́ requires hospitality and profound respect to be shown all visitors, regardless of distinctions of race, religion, national affiliation as well as economic status and doing so without any hope of remuneration or favour. Pashtuns will go to great extents to show their hospitality.

Elphinstone in 1815 observed: "The most remarkable characteristic of the Afghans is their hospitality. The practice of this virtue is so much a point of national honor, that their reproach to an inhospitable man is that he has no Pushtunwali". (Elphinston 1969: 226).

Hospitality to strangers is an obligation and is offered free, without expecting any reciprocity. But hospitality to one's kinsmen or tribesmen puts the recipient under reciprocal obligation, accompanied by the "fear that he will not be in the position to return it adequately when the occasion demands".

== See also ==
- Nanawatai
