= Pashtunwali =

Traditional way of life of the Pashtun people

Pashtunwali (Pashto: پښتونوالی, romanized: Pəx̌tunwālay, Pashto pronunciation: [pəʂ.tun.wɑ'laɪ, pəʃ.tun.wɑ'laɪ, pəç.tun.wɑ'laɪ, pəx.tun.wɑ'le/pʊx.tun.wɑ'le]), also known as Pakhtunwali and Afghaniyat, is the traditional lifestyle or a code of honour and tribal code of the Pashtun people by which they live. Many scholars widely have interpreted it as being "the way of the Pashtuns" or "the code of life". Pashtunwali is widely practised by Pashtuns in the Pashtun-dominated regions, and dates back to ancient pre-Islamic times.

== Overview ==
The native Pashtun tribes, often described as fiercely independent people, who inhabit the Pashtunistan region follow this traditional code of conduct that governs the social behavior and values of the Pashtuns, which is called Pashtunwali, and it is described as being ancient, which the Pashtuns follow and predates Islam. Because of that, much of their mountainous territory has remained outside government rule or control. Pashtun resistance to outside rule and the terrain they reside in is sometimes speculated to be why Indigenous Pashtuns still follow the "code of life".

Some non-Pashtun Afghans and others have also adopted its ideology or practices for their own benefit. Conversely, many urbanized Pashtuns tend to ignore the rules of Pashtunwali. Passed on from generation to generation, Pashtunwali guides both individual and communal conduct.

Ideal Pukhtun behaviour approximates the features of Pukhtunwali, the code of the Pukhtuns, which includes the following traditional features: courage (tora), revenge (badal), hospitality (melmestia), generosity to a defeated...

— Maliha Zulfacar, 1999

Pashtuns embrace an ancient traditional, spiritual, and communal identity tied to a set of moral codes and rules of behaviour, as well as to a record of history spanning some seventeen hundred years.

Pashtunwali promotes self-respect, independence, justice, hospitality, love, forgiveness, revenge and tolerance toward all (especially to strangers or guests). It is considered to be the personal responsibility of every Pashtun to discover and rediscover Pashtunwali's essence and meaning.

It is the way of the Pashtuns. We have melmestia, being a good host, nanawatai, giving asylum, and badal, vengeance. Pashtuns live by these things.

— Abdur, A character in Morgen's War

The Pashtun tribes are always engaged in private or public war. Every man is a warrior, a politician and a theologian. Every large house is a real feudal fortress. ... Every family cultivates its vendetta; every clan, its feud. ... Nothing is ever forgotten and very few debts are left unpaid.

Winston Churchill (My Early Life, Chapter 11: "The Mahmund Valley")

== Pashtun institutions ==
Pashtuns are organised into tribal or extended family groups often led by a "Malik" (a wealthy and influential leader from the group). Disputes within clans are settled by a jirga (traditionally a tribal assembly involving all adult males). In times of foreign invasion, Pashtuns have been known to unite under Pashtun religious leaders such as Saidullah Baba in the Siege of Malakand and even under Pashtána female leaders such as Malalai of Maiwand in the Battle of Maiwand.

== Main principles ==
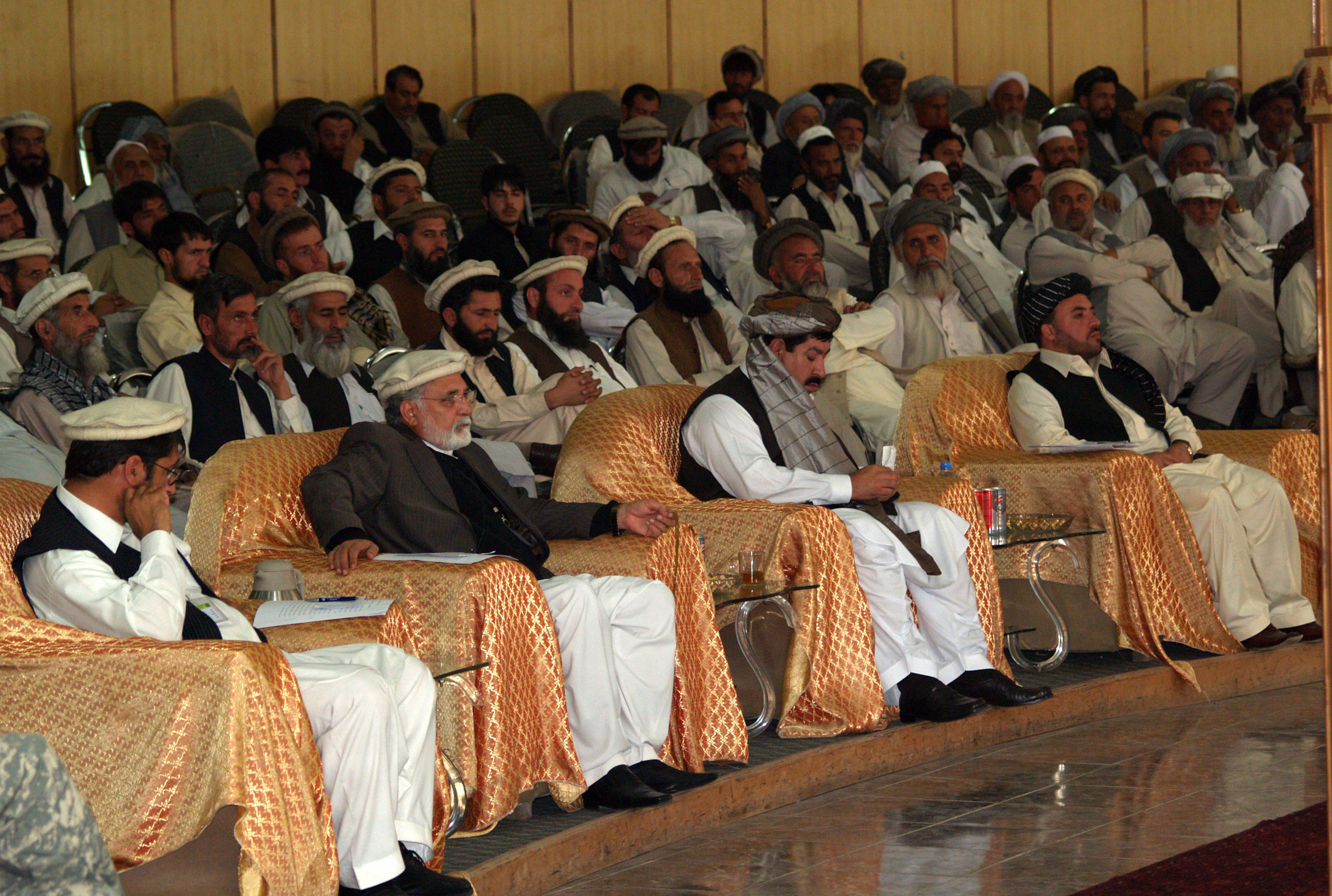
From left to right: Jamaluddin Badar, Nuristan governor, Fazlullah Wahidi, Kunar governor, Gul Agha Sherzai, Nangarhar governor, and Lutfullah Mashal, Laghman governor, listen to speakers talk about peace, prosperity and the rehabilitation of Afghanistan during the first regional Jirga in 2009.

Although not exclusive, the following thirteen principles form the major components of Pashtunwali.

The three primary principles:

1. Hospitality (Pashto: مېلمستيا, romanized: melmastyā́) – Showing hospitality and respect to all visitors, regardless of race, religion, nationality or wealth, without any expectation of repayment. Pashtuns will go to great lengths to show their hospitality.
2. Asylum (Pashto: ننواتې, romanized: nənawā́te) – Protection given to a fugitive from his enemies, at all costs. Even those running from the law must be given refuge until the situation can be clarified. In a notable example, US Navy officer Marcus Luttrell, the sole survivor of a US Navy SEAL team ambushed by Taliban fighters, was aided by members of the Pashtun Sabray tribe. The tribal chief Mohammed Gulab gave the soldier refuge in his village, fending off attacking tribes until he was returned to nearby US forces.
3. Justice and revenge (Pashto: نياو او بدل, romanized: nyāw aw badál) – To seek justice or take revenge against a wrongdoer. No time limit restricts the revenge period. Even a mere taunt (Pashto: پېغور, romanized: peghor) may count as a mortal insult. Monetary compensation can be an alternative to badal, for example to expiate murder.

The other main principles:

1. Bravery (Pashto: توره, romanized: túra). A Pashtun must defend his land, property, and family from intruders, killing them if provoked.
2. Loyalty (Pashto: وفا, romanized: wapā́). A Pashtun must be loyal to family, friends and tribe members.
3. Kindness (Pashto: ښېګړه, romanized: x̌egřh). Pashtuns should act for the welfare of others.
4. Arbitration (Pashto: جرګه, romanized: jergá). Disputes are to be resolved through the Jirga.
5. Faith (Pashto: ګروه, romanized: groh) Trust in Allah. The notion of trusting in the Creator generally equates to Islamic monotheism (tawhid).
6. Respect (Pashto: پت, romanized: pat) and pride (Pashto: وياړ, romanized: wyāṛ). A Pashtun man's pride must be respected, and he must respect himself and others, especially strangers. Respect begins at home, among family members and relatives. A man without respect is unworthy of being a Pashtun. In the poetry of Khushal Khattak, “The loss of life and wealth should not matter, what matters is pat."
7. Female honour (Pashto: ناموس, romanized: nāmús). A Pashtun must defend the honor of women at all costs and must protect them from all harm and disrespect.
8. Honour (Pashto: ننګ, romanized: nang). A Pashtun must defend the weak around him.
9. Manhood or chivalry (Pashto: مېړانه, romanized: meṛā́na). A Pashtun must demonstrate courage. A turban is considered a symbol of chivalry.
10. Country (Pashto: هېواد, romanized: hewā́d). A Pashtun is obliged to protect the land of the Pashtuns and the traditional customs.

== See also ==
- Blood feud
- Bushido
- Chivalry
- Islamic military jurisprudence
- Izzat (honour)
- Kanun
- Khushal Khattak
- Pashtun nationalism
- Pashtunistan
