= Electoral history of Imran Khan =

Elections featuring Prime Minister of Pakistan

This is a summary of the electoral history of Imran Khan, who served as the prime minister of Pakistan from 2018 to 2022. He also served as the chairman of Pakistan Tehreek-e-Insaf (PTI) from 1996 to 2023.

He contested his first elections from nine different constituencies in the 1997 general elections, but was unsuccessful from all of them. In the 2002 general elections, he contested from four constituencies, and was only victorious in NA-71 Mianwali-I, being elected to the National Assembly of Pakistan for the first time. He did not contest the 2008 general elections due to him and his party deciding to boycott them. In the 2013 general elections, he again contested from four constituencies, and won three. He decided to retain NA-56 Rawalpindi-VIII and vacate the other two. In the 2018 general elections, he decided to contest five constituencies, and won all of them. He decided to retain NA-95 Mianwali-I, while vacating the rest.

He also contested the 2022 Pakistani by-elections as the PTI candidate from eight of the nine constituencies up for election, and won seven of them. He was de-notified by the Election Commission of Pakistan (ECP) from all but NA-45 Kurram-I, although he never took oath as a member from that seat.

He attempted to contest from NA-89 Mianwali-I and NA-122 Lahore-VI in the 2024 general elections, but his nomination papers were rejected due to his disqualification in the Toshakhana reference case.

== Summary ==
Election	House	Constituency	Result	Party
1997	National Assembly	NA-11 Abbottabad-cum-Haripur-I	Lost	PTI
1997	National Assembly	NA-18 Dera Ismail Khan-cum-Tank-cum-Kulachi	Lost	PTI
1997	National Assembly	NA-21 Swat-I	Lost	PTI
1997	National Assembly	NA-35 Islamabad	Lost	PTI
1997	National Assembly	NA-53 Mianwali-I	Lost	PTI
1997	National Assembly	NA-94 Lahore-III	Lost	PTI
1997	National Assembly	NA-95 Lahore-IV	Lost	PTI
1997	National Assembly	NA-184 Karachi West-I	Lost	PTI
1997	National Assembly	NA-190 Karachi South-II	Lost	PTI
2002	National Assembly	NA-15 Karak	Lost	PTI
2002	National Assembly	NA-29 Swat-I	Lost	PTI
2002	National Assembly	NA-71 Mianwali-I	Won	PTI
2002	National Assembly	NA-122 Lahore-V	Lost	PTI
2013	National Assembly	NA-1 Peshawar-I (Note: Vacated)	Won	PTI
2013	National Assembly	NA-56 Rawalpindi-VIII	Won	PTI
2013	National Assembly	NA-71 Mianwali-I	Won	PTI
2013	National Assembly	NA-122 Lahore-V	Lost	PTI
2018	National Assembly	NA-35 Bannu	Won	PTI
2018	National Assembly	NA-53 Islamabad-II	Won	PTI
2018	National Assembly	NA-95 Mianwali-I	Won	PTI
2018	National Assembly	NA-131 Lahore-IX	Won	PTI
2018	National Assembly	NA-243 Karachi East-II	Won	PTI
2022 (Note: By-election)	National Assembly	NA-22 Mardan-III (Note: De-notified)	Won	PTI
2022	National Assembly	NA-24 Charsadda-II	Won	PTI
2022	National Assembly	NA-31 Peshawar-V	Won	PTI
2022	National Assembly	NA-45 Kurram-I (Note: Never took oath)	Won	PTI
2022	National Assembly	NA-108 Faisalabad-VIII	Won	PTI
2022	National Assembly	NA-118 Nankana Sahib-II	Won	PTI
2022	National Assembly	NA-237 Karachi Malir-II	Lost	PTI
2022	National Assembly	NA-239 Karachi Korangi-I	Won	PTI

== Election results ==
=== By-elections 2022 ===
By-election 2022: NA-22 Mardan-III
Party	Candidate	Votes	%	±%
PTI	Imran Khan	76,681	50.01	▲20.88
JUI (F)	Maulana Muhammad Qasim	68,181	44.46	
JI	Abdul Wasi	8,239	5.37	
Independent	Muhammad Sarwar	243	0.16	
Turnout		155,208	32.94	▼18.65
Total valid votes		153,344	98.80	
Rejected ballots		1,864	1.20	
Majority		8,500	5.54	▲4.42
Registered electors		471,184		
PTI hold				

By-election 2022: NA-24 Charsadda-II
Party	Candidate	Votes	%	±%
PTI	Imran Khan	78,589	50.64	▲9.32
ANP	Aimal Wali Khan	68,356	44.05	▲14.61
JI	Mujeeb-ur-Rehman	7,883	5.08	
Independent	Sparlay Mohmand	349	0.22	
Turnout		157,767	29.02	▼16.27
Total valid votes		155,177	98.36	
Rejected ballots		2,590	1.64	
Majority		10,233	6.59	▼5.29
Registered electors		526,682		
PTI hold				

By-election 2022: NA-31 Peshawar-V
Party	Candidate	Votes	%	±%
PTI	Imran Khan	57,818	61.14	▲6.54
ANP	Ghulam Ahmad Bilour	32,252	34.10	▲7.71
JI	Muhammad Aslam	3,816	4.03	
PRHP	Saeed Ullah Khan	306	0.32	
Independent	Emran Khan	221	0.23	
Tehreek-e-Jawanan Pakistan	Abdul Qadir	80	0.08	
Independent	Shaukat Ali	42	0.04	▼3.29
Independent	Shokat Ali	38	0.04	
Turnout		95,953	20.28	▼21.92
Total valid votes		94,573	98.56	
Rejected ballots		1,380	1.44	
Majority		25,566	27.03	▼1.18
Registered electors		473,180		
PTI hold				

By-election 2022: NA-45 Kurram-I
Party	Candidate	Votes	%	±%
PTI	Imran Khan	20,748	58.42	▲28.57
JUI (F)	Jamil Khan Chamkhani	12,718	35.81	▲8.08
Independent	Saif Ullah Khan	743	2.09	▲1.94
Independent	Jahanzaib	388	1.09	
Independent	Sarfraz Khan	260	0.73	
JI	Sher Muhammad Khan	258	0.72	
Independent	Eid Gul Mengal	91	0.26	▲0.20
Independent	Fakhar Zaman Khan	88	0.25	
Independent	Niaz Badshah	73	0.20	▲0.08
Independent	Abdul Qadir	69	0.19	▲0.11
Independent	Muhammad Shoaib	32	0.09	▼0.31
Independent	Khalil Ur Rehman	22	0.06	
Independent	Shah Nawaz Khan	19	0.05	
Independent	Muhammad Zahir Shah	7	0.02	
Turnout		36,676	18.47	▼13.95
Total valid votes		35,516	96.84	
Rejected ballots		1,160	3.16	
Majority		8,030	22.61	▲20.59
Registered electors		198,618		
PTI hold				

By-election 2022: NA-108 Faisalabad-VIII
Party	Candidate	Votes	%	±%
PTI	Imran Khan	99,841	54.76	▲8.28
PML(N)	Abid Sher Ali	75,266	41.28	▼4.67
TLP	Muhammad Sadique	3,088	1.69	▼1.62
Independent	Abdul Hafeez	1,408	0.77	
Independent	Malik Muhammad Ali Tahir	766	0.42	
Independent	Shahbaz Ali Gulzar	673	0.37	
Independent	Farrukh Habib	645	0.35	
Pakistan Nazriyati Party	Khurram Shahzad	394	0.22	
Independent	Liaqat Ali	97	0.05	
Independent	Rizwan Ahmad	83	0.05	
Awami Justice Party Pakistan	Sohail Kashif	51	0.03	▼0.13
Independent	Arsalan Arshad	23	0.01	
Turnout		184,350	36.49	▼20.52
Total valid votes		182,335	98.91	
Rejected ballots		2,015	1.09	
Majority		24,575	13.48	▲12.99
Registered electors		505,186		
PTI hold				

By-election 2022: NA-118 Nankana Sahib-II
Party	Candidate	Votes	%	±%
PTI	Imran Khan	90,180	45.97	▲15.37
PML(N)	Shizra Mansab Ali Khan	78,024	39.77	▲10.38
TLP	Syed Afzaal Hussain Rizvi	24,630	12.55	▼11.11
Independent	Mulazim Hussain	2,276	1.16	
Independent	Muhammad Rizwan	583	0.30	
Independent	Ijaz Ahmed Shah	221	0.11	
Independent	Faisal Rasheed Bhatti	142	0.07	
Independent	Saeed Ahmad Zafar	131	0.07	▼2.78
Turnout		198,790	44.10	▼14.63
Total valid votes		196,187	98.69	
Rejected ballots		2,603	1.31	
Majority		12,156	6.20	▲4.99
Registered electors		450,810		
PTI hold				

By-election 2022: NA-237 Karachi Malir-II
Party	Candidate	Votes	%	±%
PPP	Abdul Hakeem Baloch	32,567	55.14	▲28.51
PTI	Imran Khan	22,493	38.08	▲10.30
TLP	Samiullah Khan	2,956	5.00	▼4.74
PSP	Muhammad Amir Shaikhani	279	0.47	▼0.76
JUI (F)	Muhammad Ismail	221	0.37	
Independent	Irshad Ali	193	0.33	
Independent	Syed Shariq Jamal	182	0.31	
Independent	Khalid Mehmood Ali	81	0.14	
Independent	Tariq Aziz	36	0.06	
Independent	Jamil Ahmed Khan	32	0.05	
Independent	Nauman Abdullah	26	0.04	
Turnout		59,902	20.33	▼21.90
Total valid votes		59,066	98.60	
Rejected ballots		836	1.40	
Majority		10,074	17.06	▲15.91
Registered electors		294,699		
PPP gain from PTI				

By-election 2022: NA-239 Korangi Karachi-I
Party	Candidate	Votes	%	±%
PTI	Imran Khan	50,014	58.22	▲27.38
MQM-P	Syed Nayyar Raza	18,116	21.08	▼9.61
TLP	Muhammad Yasin	7,953	9.26	▼4.97
PPP	Imran Haider Abdi	4,506	5.24	▼0.06
MQM-H	Khurram Maqsood	1,590	1.85	▲0.94
PSP	Syed Shariq Jamal	1,208	1.41	▼0.58
Independent	Ansaar Ahmed	921	1.07	
JUI (F)	Muhammad Ramzan	352	0.41	
Independent	Shaukat Ullah Farooqi	333	0.39	
Independent	Muhammad Asad Usmani	310	0.36	
Independent	Muhammad Tariq	190	0.22	▲0.06
Independent	Sikandar Khatoon	105	0.12	
Pakistan Muslim Alliance	Qasier Iqbal	78	0.09	
Independent	Akram Cheema	47	0.05	
Independent	Akhtar Hussain	43	0.05	
Independent	Rehan Mansoor	42	0.05	
Independent	Muhammad Ihsaan	25	0.03	
Independent	Muhammad Aamir Sheikhani	23	0.03	
Independent	Rehman Waheed Bajwa	22	0.03	
Independent	Syed Sajid Tarmazi	15	0.02	
Independent	Mushtaq Ahmed Ishtiaq Zahool	14	0.02	
Independent	Maqbool Ahmed	4	0.01	
Turnout		86,568	14.88	▼27.53
Total valid votes		85,911	99.24	
Rejected ballots		657	0.76	
Majority		31,898	37.13	▲36.18
Registered electors		581,888		
PTI hold				

=== General election 2018 ===
General election 2018: NA-35 Bannu
Party	Candidate	Votes	%	±%
PTI	Imran Khan	113,843	47.63	▲33.12
MMA	Akram Khan Durrani (Note: Jamaat-e-Islami and Jamiat Ulema-e-Islam (F) contested separately in 2013 but jointly as parts of MMA in 2018. As a result, vote share changes use the sum of their 2013 votes.)	106,842	44.70	▼7.37
PPP	Syeda Yasmin Safdar	9,174	3.84	▲2.51
Independent	Hamid Shah	1,728	0.72	
JUI-S	Islam Noor	1,624	0.68	
Independent	Muhammad Usman Ali Khan	1,418	0.59	
PSP	Abdul Samad Khan	1,023	0.43	
PJDP	Inam Ullah	1,015	0.42	
Independent	Amin Ullah	873	0.37	
PAT	Wali Dad Khan	852	0.36	
Independent	Safdar Iqbal Shah	308	0.13	
APML	Liaqat Ali Khan	306	0.13	▲0.10
Turnout		246,363	42.56	▲1.96
Total valid votes		239,006	97.01	
Rejected ballots		7,357	2.99	
Majority		7,001	2.93	▼15.94
Registered electors		578,872		
PTI gain from JUI (F)				

General election 2018: NA-53 Islamabad-II
Party	Candidate	Votes	%
PTI	Imran Khan	93,110	53.13
PML(N)	Shahid Khaqan Abbasi	44,347	25.31
PPP	Syed Sibt Ul Haider Bukhari	17,973	10.26
MMA	Mian Muhammad Aslam	6,750	3.85
TLP	Muhammad Afnan Umer Baloch	5,147	2.94
AAT	Chaudhry Saeed Ahmed	1,361	0.78
Independent	Asif	1,349	0.77
AWP	Ammar Rashid	912	0.52
Humdardan-e-Watan Pakistan	Ghulam Rasul	755	0.43
Independent	Malik Muhammad Yousaf	623	0.36
Independent	Haroon Arshad Sheikh	484	0.28
Pakistan Awami League	Nasir Mehmood	413	0.24
Tehreek-e-Labbaik Islam	Abdul Hafeez	369	0.21
Independent	Shamakh Hassan Khan	290	0.17
Independent	Khawaja Khalil Ur Rehman	248	0.14
Independent	Amjad Masih	160	0.09
PTI-G	Ayesha Gulalai Wazir	138	0.08
PSP	Shahzad Asif Javed	125	0.07
APML	Mohammad Amjad	94	0.05
Independent	Raja Qadeer Ahmad	94	0.05
Independent	Mansoor Akash Randhawa	89	0.05
Independent	Javed Akhtar	81	0.05
Independent	Nasir Munir Ahmed	81	0.05
Independent	Muhammad Zafar	58	0.03
Independent	Syed Amjad Ali Shah	55	0.03
ANP	Nadeem Sarwar	31	0.02
Independent	Mukhdoom Muhammad Niaz Inqlabi	30	0.02
PJDP	Abdul Wahab	23	0.01
Independent	Nadeem Ul Zafar Khan	22	0.01
Aam Log Party Pakistan	Muhammad Asif Nawaz	17	0.01
Independent	Asif Fazal Chauhdry	12	0.01
Turnout		176,721	56.62
Total valid votes		175,241	99.16
Rejected ballots		1,480	0.84
Majority		48,763	27.83
Registered electors		312,142	
PTI win (new seat)			

General election 2018: NA-95 Mianwali-I
Party	Candidate	Votes	%	±%
PTI	Imran Khan	165,518	67.02	▲23.01
PML(N)	Obaidullah Shadikhel	50,233	20.34	▼34.30
TLP	Muhammad Tauqeer Ul Hasnain Shah	16,828	6.81	
Independent	Nawab Malik Amir Muhammad Khan	7,173	2.90	
MMA	Amir Ullah	2,338	0.95	
PPP	Muhammad Khalid Khan	1,588	0.64	▲0.41
PJDP	Abdul Wahab	864	0.35	
SIC	Muhammad Sardar Bahadur Khan	854	0.35	
Independent	Asad Hassan Khan	739	0.30	
Independent	Muhammad Khalid Qureshi	476	0.19	▼0.07
Independent	Manzoor Ahmed Khan	340	0.14	
Turnout		255,296	54.82	▲8.86
Total valid votes		246,951	96.73	
Rejected ballots		8,345	3.27	
Majority		115,285	46.68	▲36.05
Registered electors		465,740		
PTI gain from PML(N)				

General election 2018: NA-131 Lahore-IX
Party	Candidate	Votes	%
PTI	Imran Khan	84,531	44.70
PML(N)	Khawaja Saad Rafique	83,775	44.30
TLP	Syed Murtaza Hasan	9,788	5.18
PPP	Asim Mehmood	6,755	3.57
MMA	Waqar Nadeem Warraich	5,147	2.72
Independent	Faheem Ahmed Khan Lodhi	656	0.35
BPP	Jawad Ahmad	367	0.19
PST	Tahir Aslam	363	0.19
Independent	Nadeem Ahmad	357	0.19
PJDP	Muhammad Mudassar	144	0.08
Independent	Shoaib Ullah Cheema	128	0.07
Independent	MIan Zahid Islam Anjum	118	0.06
PTI-G	Mozaffer Ali	106	0.06
Independent	Humayun Akhtar Khan	95	0.05
Independent	Muhammad Jahangir Dogar	18	0.01
Turnout		191,738	52.64
Total valid votes		189,114	98.63
Rejected ballots		2,624	1.37
Majority		756	0.40
Registered electors		364,213	
PTI win (new seat)			

General election 2018: NA-243 Karachi East-III
Party	Candidate	Votes	%	±%
PTI	Imran Khan	91,373	56.05	▲25.22
MQM-P	Syed Ali Raza Abidi	24,082	14.77	▼35.72
MMA	Osama Razi	16,214	9.95	▲3.65
PPP	Shehla Raza	10,633	6.52	▲1.48
PML(N)	Shahjahan	7,912	4.85	
TLP	Syed Nawaz Ul Huda	6,489	3.98	
PSP	Muhammad Muzammil Qureshi	3,641	2.23	
AAT	Muzamil Iqbal Hashmi	1,127	0.69	
Independent	Syed Asif Raza	716	0.44	
PJDP	Abdul Wahab	483	0.30	
MQM-H	Syed Kamran Ali Rizvi	115	0.07	▲0.01
Independent	Muhammad Ayaz	110	0.07	
Independent	Khawaja Izharul Hassan	53	0.03	
Independent	Muhammad Kamran Khan	50	0.03	
People's Movement of Pakistan	Anwaar Ahmed Farouqi	37	0.02	
Turnout		165,315	41.14	▲0.40
Total valid votes		163,035	98.62	
Rejected ballots		2,280	1.38	
Majority		67,291	41.27	▲21.61
Registered electors		401,833		
PTI gain from MQM-P				

=== General election 2013 ===
General election 2013: NA-1 Peshawar-I
Party	Candidate	Votes	%	±%
PTI	Imran Khan	90,500	61.97	
ANP	Ghulam Ahmad Bilour	24,468	16.75	▼33.30
PPP	Muhammad Zulfiqar Afghani	7,121	4.88	▼37.48
JI	Shabir Ahmad Khan	7,051	4.83	
MDM	Hazrat Muhammad	4,827	3.31	
JUI (F)	Haji Shah Nawaz	4,738	3.24	
PML(N)	Muhammad Afzal Khan Panyala	4,232	2.90	
QWP	Jan Alam Khan Paracha	1,694	1.16	
PPP(SB)	Amir Syed	454	0.31	▲0.05
Independent	Pir Abdur Rehman	265	0.18	
Independent	Akram Khan	182	0.12	
MQM	Bashir Ahmad Afridi	117	0.08	▼0.09
JUP (N)	Syed Muhammad Sibtain Taj Agha	100	0.07	
MP	Aamir Shehzad Hashmi	77	0.05	
PML(J)	Khalid Tanveer Rohela Advocate	70	0.05	
Independent	Hidayatullah Khan Afridi Advocate	61	0.04	
Pakistan Insani Haqooq Party	Tariq Saeed	45	0.03	
JUINP	Moeen ud Din	42	0.03	
Turnout		148,147	46.21	▲23.23
Total valid votes		146,044	98.58	
Rejected ballots		2,103	1.42	
Majority		66,032	45.21	▲37.82
Registered electors		320,578		
PTI gain from ANP				

General election 2013: NA-56 Rawalpindi-VIII
Party	Candidate	Votes	%	±%
PTI	Imran Khan	80,577	50.25	
PML(N)	Hanif Abbasi	67,221	41.92	▼26.31
JI	Raza Ahmed Shah	6,463	4.03	
PPP	Raja Israr Ahmed Abbasi	4,091	2.55	▼18.56
Independent	Bin Hur Yousaf	722	0.45	
TTP	Kamal Azfar	277	0.17	
JUI (F)	Muhammad Zubair Abbasi	272	0.17	
Independent	Mullana Muhammad Ayaz	131	0.08	
Islamic Republican Party	Raja Zafar Iqbal	93	0.06	
MQM	Malik Aurang Zaib Awan	86	0.05	▼0.12
PPP(SB)	Alhaj Muhammad Asad Bhatti	75	0.05	
Independent	Ashfaq Abbasi	73	0.05	
Pak Wattan Party	Ali Adrees	62	0.04	
Independent	Muhammad Zahid Aziz Alvi	59	0.04	
Independent	Asif Javeed	40	0.02	
Pakistan Freedom Party	Sardar Naseer Ahmed	35	0.02	
Independent	Muhammad Zubair Kiani	26	0.02	
Pakistan Justice Party	Saira Khatoon	26	0.02	
Markazi Jamiat Mushaikh Pakistan	Wajid Hussain Mughal	24	0.01	
Independent	Chauhdry Hamad Afzal	10	0.01	
Turnout		161,842	56.11	▲21.04
Total valid votes		160,363	99.09	
Rejected ballots		1,479	0.91	
Majority		13,356	8.33	▼38.79
Registered electors		288,423		
PTI gain from PML(N)				

General election 2013: NA-71 Mianwali-I
Party	Candidate	Votes	%	±%
PTI	Imran Khan	133,224	61.57	
PML(N)	Obaidullah Shadikhel	73,373	33.91	▲32.63
Independent	Muhammad Sardar Bahadur Babar Khan	4,926	2.28	
Independent	Syed Rafiq Ahmad Shah	1,829	0.85	
PPP	Shaukat Pervez Khan	924	0.43	▼2.19
Independent	Muhammad Ali Khan	442	0.06	
Independent	Abdul Azeem Khan	421	0.20	
Tanzeem-e-Ahl-e-Sunnat	Allama Peer Muhammad Khan Qadri	329	0.15	
Independent	Muhammad Asghar Khan	322	0.15	
Independent	Mohammad Khalid Qureshi	277	0.13	
Independent	Inamullah Niazi	184	0.09	
MQM	Abdul Hameed Khan	143	0.07	
Turnout		224,382	57.99	▲7.13
Total valid votes		216,394	96.44	
Rejected ballots		7,988	3.56	
Majority		59,851	27.66	▲21.46
Registered electors		386,930		
PTI gain from Independent				

General election 2013: NA-122 Lahore-V
Party	Candidate	Votes	%	±%
PML(N)	Ayaz Sadiq	93,389	51.28	▼17.05
PTI	Imran Khan	84,517	46.41	
PPP	Mian Amir Hassan	2,833	1.56	▼19.89
Independent	Shehnaz Lagari	277	0.15	
TTP	Waheed Ahmad Khan	217	0.12	
MDM	Hafiz Asim Makdoom	165	0.09	
PST	Muhammad Imran Javaid	133	0.07	
Independent	Fayyaz Nazir	96	0.05	
CML	Tauseef Ur Rehman Bhatti	71	0.04	
Independent	Muhammad Shakeel	61	0.03	
Independent	Javed Hashmi	56	0.03	
Independent	Muhammad Aslam Rao	54	0.03	
MQM	Samia Naz	49	0.03	▼0.09
Independent	Junaid Murtaza	44	0.02	
Independent	Muhammad Naeem Mir	43	0.02	
Independent	Muhammad Awais Ijaz	30	0.02	
Pakistan Justice Party	Malik Noor Muhammad Sarfraz Awan	29	0.02	
Independent	Mian Muhammad Liaqat	15	0.01	
Aap Janab Sarkar Party	Nawab Amber Shahzada	15	0.01	
Awami Justice Party Pakistan	Mushtaq Ahmad Bhatti	10	0.01	
Turnout		184,279	56.52	▲20.91
Total valid votes		182,104	98.82	
Rejected ballots		2,175	1.18	
Majority		8,872	4.87	▼42.00
Registered electors		326,028		
PML(N) hold				

=== General election 2002 ===
General election 2002: NA-15 Karak
Party	Candidate	Votes	%	±%
MMA	Shah Abdul Aziz	31,325	32.75	▲5.23
PPP	Masood Sharif Khattak	17,712	18.52	
PML(N)	Rehmat Salam	13,381	13.99	▲3.34
PTI	Imran Khan	9,972	10.43	▲5.66
Independent	Mufti Ajmal Khan	9,443	9.87	
ANP	Muhammad Amin Khattak	9,110	9.52	▼31.60
PPP(S)	Said Ullah Shah	3,237	3.38	
Independent	Mir Zakim Khan	1,113	1.16	
PMAP	Badshah Jan	193	0.20	
Independent	Farzana Masood	83	0.09	
Independent	Muhammad Iqbal	75	0.08	
Turnout		97,424	38.74	▲6.77
Total valid votes		95,644	98.17	
Rejected ballots		1,780	1.83	
Majority		13,613	14.23	▲1.04
Registered electors		251,508		
MMA gain from ANP				

General election 2002: NA-29 Swat-I
Party	Candidate	Votes	%	±%
MMA	Qari Abdul Baees Saddiqui	65,808	67.16	▲62.72
PML(Q)	Miangul Adnan Aurangzeb	18,265	18.64	
PTI	Imran Khan	6,060	6.18	▼11.19
PPP	Shmasher Ali Khan	5,921	6.04	▼6.27
NA	Azeem Khan Advocate	1,932	1.97	
Turnout		100,451	31.94	▲5.01
Total valid votes		97,986	97.55	
Rejected ballots		2,465	2.45	
Majority		47,543	48.52	▲31.31
Registered electors		314,521		
MMA gain from PML(N)				

General election 2002: NA-71 Mianwali-I
Party	Candidate	Votes	%	±%
PTI	Imran Khan	66,737	48.34	▲30.78
PML(Q)	Obaidullah Shadikhel	60,533	43.85	
MMA	Nawabzada Malik Amad Khan	4,817	3.49	
NA	Tariq Abbas Khan	2,057	1.49	
Independent	Abdul Qayyum Khan	1,835	1.33	
PPP	G.M. Shah	1,685	1.22	
PAT	Muhammad Hassan Khan	386	0.28	
Turnout		144,068	46.89	▲5.01
Total valid votes		138,050	95.82	
Rejected ballots		6,018	4.18	
Majority		6,204	4.49	▲1.59
Registered electors		307,223		
PTI gain from PML(N)				

General election 2002: NA-122 Lahore-V
Party	Candidate	Votes	%
PML(N)	Ayaz Sadiq	37,531	40.79
PTI	Imran Khan	18,638	20.26
PPP	Chaudhry Ghulam Qadir	17,561	19.09
PML(Q)	Muhammad Amin Zulqernain	12,605	13.70
Independent	Chaudhry Muhammad Ali	3,314	3.60
Independent	Asad Bashir Kamboh	910	0.99
PAT	Rana Zafarullah Khan Manj	613	0.67
Jamiat Ulema-e-Pakistan (Nifaz-e-Shariat)	Engineer Muhammad Saleem Ullah Khan	581	0.28
Independent	Mian Asad Ata Ullah	141	0.15
Independent	Humayun Akhtar Khan	65	0.07
Independent	Haroon Akhtar Khan	50	0.05
Turnout		93,257	33.40
Total valid votes		92,009	98.66
Rejected ballots		1,248	1.34
Majority		18,893	20.53
Registered electors		279,245	
PML(N) win (new seat)			

=== General election 1997 ===
General election 1997: NA-11 Abbottabad-cum-Haripur-I
Party	Candidate	Votes	%	±%
PML(N)	Mehtab Abbasi	55,341	63.42	▲5.23
Independent	Amanullah Khan Jadoon	21,253	24.36	
PTI	Imran Khan	5,227	5.99	
PPP	Syed Muhammad Gulzar Abbasi	2,509	2.88	
PPP(SB)	Rashida Batool	1,405	1.61	
Independent	Haji Mushtaq Awan	1,097	1.26	
JUI (F)	Qari Mahboob-ur-Rehman Qureshi	431	0.49	
Turnout		89,157	32.30	▼9.67
Total valid votes		87,263	97.88	
Rejected ballots		1,894	2.12	
Majority		34,088	39.06	▲17.72
Registered electors		276,034		
PML(N) hold				

General election 1997: NA-18 Dera Ismail Khan-cum-Tank-cum-Kulachi
Party	Candidate	Votes	%	±%
PML(N)	Alhaj Sardar Umer Farooq Khan	74,486	43.84	▲9.66
JUI (F)	Fazal-ur-Rehman	53,948	31.75	▼5.56
Independent	Fazal Karim Kundi	16,720	9.84	▼10.49
PTI	Imran Khan	6,001	3.53	
Independent	Khalifa Abdul Qayoom	5,184	3.05	
Independent	Musarrat Shaheen	3,131	1.84	
Independent	Haji Sanaullah Khan	2,799	1.65	
Independent	Aminullah Khan	2,764	1.63	
Independent	Ghulam Abbas Shah Advocate	1,679	0.99	
Independent	Malik Salahuddin	1,212	0.71	
Independent	Nawabzada Saadat Khan	1,038	0.61	
Independent	Muhammad Tariq Arbab	952	0.56	
Turnout		174,762	39.15	▲0.65
Total valid votes		169,914	97.23	
Rejected ballots		1,894	2.77	
Majority		20,538	12.09	▲8.97
Registered electors		446,445		
PML(N) gain from Islami Jamhoori Mahaz				

General election 1997: NA-21 Swat-I
Party	Candidate	Votes	%	±%
PML(N)	Miangul Aurangzeb	25,018	40.56	▼5.31
ANP	Faqir Muhammad Khan	14,402	23.35	
PTI	Imran Khan	10,716	17.37	
PPP	Javed Iqbal	7,593	12.31	
JUI (F)	Molana Ubaidur Rehman	2,740	4.44	▼31.68
Independent	Abdul Wadood	746	1.21	▼3.80
Independent	Wazir Zada	465	0.75	
Turnout		63,930	26.93	▼5.15
Total valid votes		61,680	96.48	
Rejected ballots		2,250	3.52	
Majority		10,616	17.21	▲8.96
Registered electors		237,405		
PML(N) hold				

General election 1997: NA-35 Islamabad
Party	Candidate	Votes	%	±%
PML(N)	Syed Zafar Ali Shah	67,500	64.78	▲15.44
PPP	Nayyar Hussain Bukhari	29,847	28.64	▼12.56
PTI	Imran Khan	5,868	5.63	
HPG	Wasaal Ahmad Shahid	577	0.55	▲0.35
Independent	Nadeem Mukhtar Chaudhry	407	0.39	
Turnout		105,264	46.04	▼11.47
Total valid votes		104,199	98.99	
Rejected ballots		1,065	1.01	
Majority		37,653	36.14	▲27.99
Registered electors		228,651		
PML(N) hold				

General election 1997: NA-53 Mianwali-I
Party	Candidate	Votes	%	±%
PML(N)	Muhammad Maqbool Ahmed Khan	39,147	38.48	▲24.75
Pakistan Muslim League (Q) (Malik Ahmed Shuja)	Obaidullah Shadikhel	36,201	35.59	
PTI	Imran Khan	17,859	17.56	
Independent	Gul Hameed Khan Rokhri	5,650	5.55	▼27.04
Independent	Abdul Rehman	1,831	1.80	
Independent	Shafa Ullah Khan	488	0.48	
Independent	Mursaleen Khan Khattak	379	0.37	
Independent	Sardar Rafiq Khan	171	0.17	
Turnout		105,724	40.26	▼5.59
Total valid votes		101,726	96.22	
Rejected ballots		3,998	3.78	
Majority		2,946	2.90	▼3.47
Registered electors		262,634		
PML(N) gain from Independent				

General election 1997: NA-94 Lahore-III
Party	Candidate	Votes	%	±%
PML(N)	Tariq Aziz	50,227	67.99	▲17.47
PPP	Mian Misbah Rehman	17,821	24.13	▼21.54
PTI	Imran Khan	4,595	6.22	
PPP(SB)	Mian Naveed Aziz	435	0.59	
HPG	Almas Haider Kazmi	312	0.42	
Pakistan Muslim League (Q) (Malik Ahmed Shuja)	Qari Ashfaq Ullah	186	0.25	
Awami Ittehad	Farooq Tariq	179	0.24	
PDP	Faisal Mehmood Khan Advocate	63	0.09	
Independent	Haji Muhammad Amjad Chaudhry	51	0.07	
Turnout		74,575	33.30	▼14.47
Total valid votes		73,869	99.05	
Rejected ballots		706	0.95	
Majority		32,406	43.87	▲39.02
Registered electors		223,935		
PML(N) hold				

General election 1997: NA-95 Lahore-IV
Party	Candidate	Votes	%	±%
PML(N)	Nawaz Sharif	50,592	76.07	▲14.71
PPP	Hafiz Ghulam Mohy-ud-Din	9,623	14.47	▼20.62
PTI	Imran Khan	5,365	8.07	
Independent	Sheikh Muhammad Anwar Saeed	359	0.54	
Pakistan Peoples Party (ZAB)	Raja Abdul Sattar	223	0.34	
Independent	Khakan Bakhat Yawar Khan	133	0.20	
Independent	Muhammad Ashfaq Chaudhry	72	0.11	
Independent	Nawab Amber Shahzada	55	0.08	
Independent	Jamil Asghar Khizari	46	0.07	
Pakistan Awami Party	Hussain Abbas	38	0.06	
Turnout		67,030	29.84	▼13.49
Total valid votes		66,506	99.22	
Rejected ballots		524	0.78	
Majority		40,969	61.60	▲35.33
Registered electors		224,625		
PML(N) hold				

General election 1997: NA-184 Karachi West-I
Party	Candidate	Votes	%	±%
PML(N)	Mian Ejaz Shafi	35,451	35.10	▼8.07
HPG	Muhammad Irfan Khan	32,668	32.35	▲32.21
PPP	Naseerullah Babar	23,512	23.28	▼19.54
ANP	Muhammad Ameen Khattak	2,705	2.68	▼4.33
PTI	Imran Khan	2,037	2.02	
JUI (F)	Molana Muhammad Abdul Rehman Faroqi	1,105	1.09	
Independent	Ali Muhammad Sunara	1,075	1.06	
PML(J)	K.S. Mujahid Khan Baloch	940	0.93	
PPP(SB)	Ghulam Ahmad Chishti	842	0.83	
PMAP	Mian Umer Ber	251	0.25	
Pukhtoonkhwa Qaumi Party	Subhan Ali	191	0.19	
PDP	Shaifq Ahmed Qureshi	94	0.09	
Independent	Sardar Muhammad Ishaque	91	0.09	
Independent	Javed Ahmad Chattari	40	0.04	
Turnout		102,241	27.58	▲4.76
Total valid votes		101,002	98.79	
Rejected ballots		1,239	1.21	
Majority		2,783	2.76	▲2.41
Registered electors		223,935		
PML(N) hold				

General election 1997: NA-190 Karachi South-II
Party	Candidate	Votes	%	±%
HPG	Farooq Sattar	27,711	46.91	▲46.67
PML(N)	Haji Muhammad Hanif Tayyab	17,333	29.34	▼10.72
PPP	Iftikhar Hussain	11,621	19.67	▼28.36
PPP(SB)	Abdul Habib Memon	930	1.57	
PTI	Imran Khan	911	1.54	
MQM-H	Muhammad Salim	180	0.30	
Independent	Abdul Razzak Sangani	162	0.27	
Independent	Qasim Ghanchi	132	0.22	
Independent	Aslam Aseer	49	0.08	
Independent	Syed Nusrat Ali	49	0.08	
Turnout		59,168	26.56	▲3.15
Total valid votes		59,078	99.85	
Rejected ballots		90	0.15	
Majority		10,378	17.57	▲9.59
Registered electors		222,762		
HPG gain from PPP				

== See also ==
- Electoral history of Nawaz Sharif
