= NA-10 Buner =

Constituency of the National Assembly of Pakistan

- Constituency for the National Assembly of Pakistan
- Region: Buner District
- Electorate: 562,252

Current constituency
- Party: SIC
- Member: Gohar Ali Khan
- Created from: NA-28 (Buner)

NA-10 Buner (این اے-10، بونیر) is a constituency for the National Assembly of Pakistan. It covers the whole of district Buner. The constituency was formerly known as NA-28 (Buner) from 1977 to 2018. The name changed to NA-10 (Buner) after the delimitation in 2022.

== Members of Parliament ==
=== 1977–2002: NA-28 Buner ===
Election	Member	Party
1977	Baz Gul	Independent
1985	Umer Din Bangash	Independent
1988	Akhunzada M. Saeed	Independent
1990	Syed Yousaf Hussain	Independent
1993	Malik Zulfiqar Ali Chamkani	Independent
1997	Haji Zarin Khan Mangal	Independent

=== 2002–2018: NA-28 Buner ===
Election	Member	Party
2002	Sher Akbar Khan	PPP (S)
2008	Abdul Matin Khan	ANP
2008	Istiqbal Khan	ANP
2013	Sher Akbar Khan	JI

=== 2018–2022: NA-9 Buner ===
Election	Member	Party
2018	Sher Akbar Khan	PTI

=== 2024–present: NA-10 Buner ===
Election	Member	Party
2024	Gohar Ali Khan	PTI

== Elections since 2002 ==
=== 2002 general election ===
2002 General Election: NA-28 (Buner)
Party	Candidate	Votes	%	±%
PPP (S)	Sher Akbar Khan	34,224	46.42	
ANP	Abdul Matin Khan	19,638	26.63	
Independent	Said Raheem Advocate	12,473	16.92	
PPPP	Usman Shah	4,362	5.92	
PML-N	Ali Sher Khan	3,034	4.11	
Majority		14,586	19.79	
Turnout		73,731	28.39	
PPP (S) gain from Independent				

A total of 2,670 votes were rejected.

=== 2008 general election ===
2008 General Election: NA-28 (Buner)
Party	Candidate	Votes	%	±%
ANP	Abdul Matin Khan	21,801	29.15	+2.52
PPP	Gohar Ali Khan	18,456	24.68	+18.76
PPP-S	Sher Akbar Khan	17,241	23.05	−23.37
PAP	Fanoos Gujjar	13,396	17.91	
PML-N	Ali Sher Khan Advocate	1,994	2.67	−1.44
PML	Irshad Alam	1,904	2.55	
Majority		3,345	1.08	
Turnout		78,957	27.18	−1.21
ANP gain from PPP (S)				

A total of 4,165 votes were rejected.

=== 2008 by-election ===
A by-election was called due to the death of Abdul Matin Khan.

2008 by-election: NA-28 (Buner)
Party	Candidate	Votes	%	±%
ANP	Istiqbal Khan	30,903	42.40	+13.25
Independent	Bakht Jehan Khan	30,116	41.32	
Awami Workers Party	Fanoos Gujjar	5,341	7.33	
Jamiat Ulema-e-Islam (F)	Mulana Mufti Fazal Ghafoor	4,701	6.45	
PML-N	Ali Sher Khan Advocate	743	1.02	−1.65
Independent	Nowshad Khan Advocate	732	1.00	
Independent	Molana Muhammad Hameed	195	0.27	
Independent	Syed Amir Zeb	152	0.21	
Majority		787	1.08	
Turnout		72,883	27.35	−1.04
ANP hold		Swing		

A total of 1,805 votes were rejected.

=== 2013 general election ===
2013 General Election: NA-28 (Buner)
Party	Candidate	Votes	%	±%
JI	Sher Akbar Khan	29,170	23.71	
PTI	Mian Moin Uddin	23,336	18.96	
JUI-F	Maulana Haleen ur Rehman	21,290	17.30	
ANP	Abdul Rauf	21,151	17.19	−25.21
PML-N	Sarzamin Khan	11,917	9.69	+8.67
AWP	Fanoos Gujjar	10,039	8.16	
QWP (S)	Bakhtiar Ali	1,927	1.57	
PML-Q	Dawa Khan	1,344	1.09	
TTP	Majid Khan	1,151	0.94	
APML	Sarmir Khan	610	0.50	
PPPP	Doctor Sultan Zeb Khan	530	0.43	
JUP-N	Rashid Imran Khan	306	0.25	
JUI-S	Bakht Zar	258	0.21	
Majority		5,834	4.75	
Turnout		123,029	35.07	+7.72
JI gain from ANP				

A total of 5,188 votes were rejected.

=== 2018 general election ===
General elections were held on 25 July 2018.

General election 2018: NA-9 (Buner)
Party	Candidate	Votes	%	±%
PTI	Sher Akbar Khan	58,037	32.07	▲13.11
PML(N)	Kamran Khan	38,358	21.20	▲11.51
ANP	Haji Abdul Rauf Khan	38,015	21.00	▲3.81
MMA	Istiqbal Khan	23,354	12.91	▼28.10^{†}
Others	Others (three candidates)	15,572	8.60	
Turnout		180,968	40.62	▲5.55
Rejected ballots		7,632	4.22	
Majority		19,679	10.87	
Registered electors		445,474		
PTI gain from JI				

^{†}JUI-F, and JI contested as part of MMA

=== 2024 general election ===
General elections were held on 8 February 2024. Gohar Ali Khan won the election with 110,954 votes.

General election 2024: NA-10 Buner
Party	Candidate	Votes	%	±%
PTI	Gohar Ali Khan (Note: Filed nomination papers as PTI candidate but ECP allowed him to run as an Independent)	110,954	54.45	▲22.38
ANP	Abdur Rauf	31,056	15.24	▼5.76
JI	Bakht Jehan Khan	26,531	13.02	N/A
PML(N)	Salar Khan	19,326	9.48	▼11.72
PPP	Yousaf Ali	5,754	2.82	N/A
PTI-P	Sher Akbar Khan	4,999	2.45	N/A
AWP	Usman Ghani	4,856	2.38	▼4.31
Independent	Shah Bakht Rawan	295	0.14	N/A
Turnout		212,549	37.80	▼2.82
Rejected ballots		8,778	4.13	
Majority		78,898	39.21	▲28.34
Registered electors		562,252		

== See also ==
- NA-9 Malakand
- NA-11 Shangla
