= Yusufzai (disambiguation) =

Yusufzai is a Pashtun tribe from Afghanistan and Pakistan.

Yusufzai, Yousafzai, or Esapzai may also refer to:

== Dialect ==
- Yusufzai dialect, a dialect of Pashto spoken in central, northern, and eastern Khyber Pakhtunkhwa, Pakistan and adjacent areas of Afghanistan

== People ==
- Gaju Khan, chief of the Yousafzai who partook in Sher Shah's rebellion
- Sartor Faqir, freedom fighter
- Zabita Khan, ruler
- Abdul Ghafoor Yusufzai, Afghan footplayer who represented the Kingdom of Afghanistan in the 1948 Summer Olympics
- Abdul Latif Yousafzai, a Pakistani lawyer
- Hamidullah Yousafzai, Afghan football player
- Nisar Muhammad Yousafzai, War Hero of the Afghan War of Independence
- Madhubala (1933–1969), Indian actress
- Malala Yousafzai, Pashtun female education activist and Nobel Peace Prize laureate
- Azimullah Khan Yusufzai, known as the Man behind the Indian War of Independence
- Abaseen Yousafzai, poet
- Ziauddin Yousafzai, educator
- Mohammad Sarwar Yousafzai, an Afghanistan footballer
- Mubaraka Yusufzai (born 16th century), empress consort of the Mughal Empire
- Rahimullah Yusufzai (born 1954), Pakistani journalist
- Shaukat Ali Yousafzai (born 1963), Pakistani politician
- Abdul Hamid Khan Yusufzai (1845-1915), Bengali writer, politician and journalist
- Nowsher Ali Khan Yusufzai (1864-1924), Bengali writer and philanthropist
- Munir Buneri, a Pashto poet
- Bakht Khan, War Hero of the Indian War of Independence
- Bakht Jehan Khan, Politician and Speaker of Provincial Assembly
- Fazli Ghafoor, Jamiat Ulema-e-Islam Politician

== See also ==
- Pashtun tribes
