= NA-122 =

NA-122 may refer to:

- NA-122 (Lahore-V), a former constituency of the National Assembly of Pakistan
- NA-122 (Sheikhupura-IV), a constituency of the National Assembly of Pakistan
