= Gohar Ali Khan =

Pakistani politician (born 1971)

- گوہر علی خان
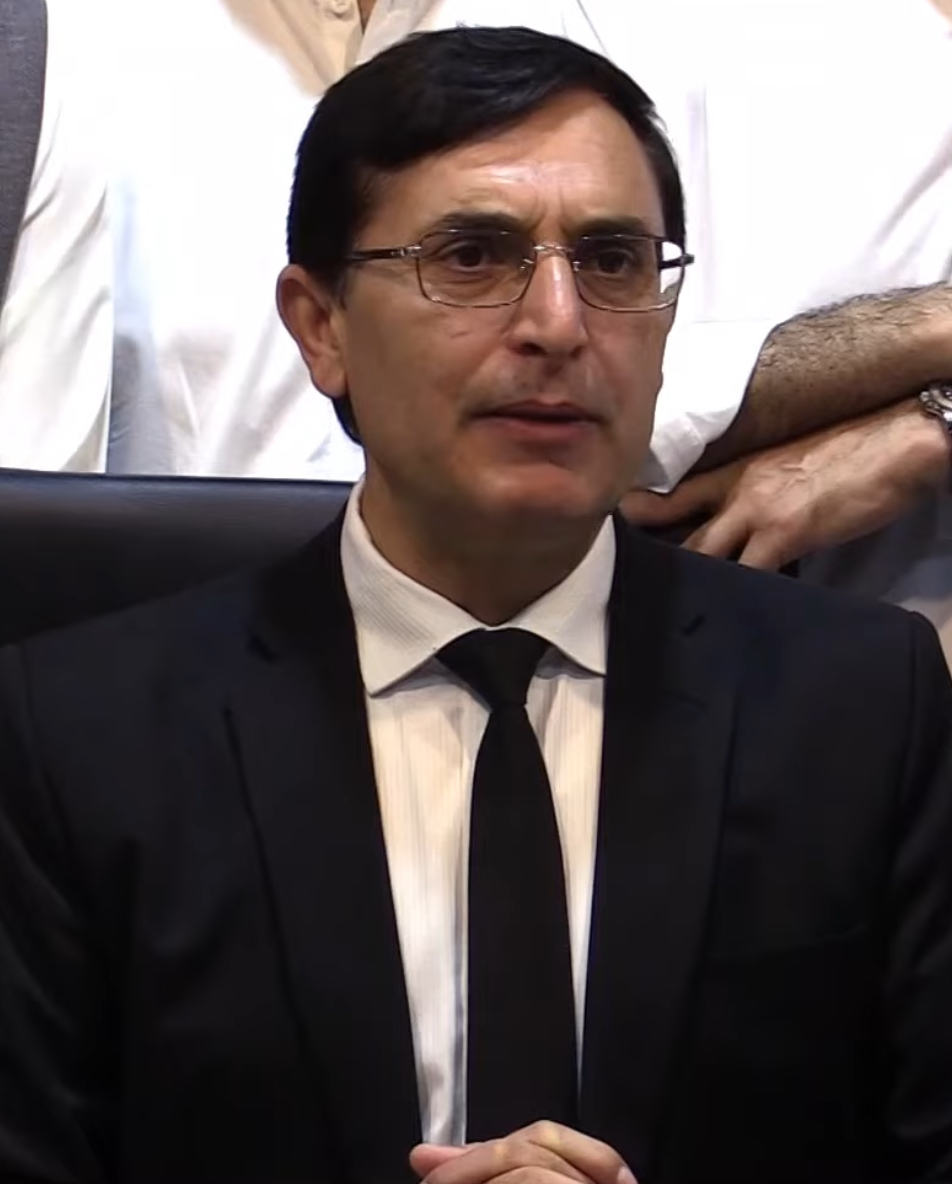
- Khan in July 2024

2nd Chairman of Pakistan Tehreek-e-Insaf
- Incumbent
- Assumed office 2 December 2023
- President: Imran Khan
- Vice Chairman: Shah Mahmood Qureshi
- Preceded by: Imran Khan

Chief Election Commissioner of Pakistan Tehreek-e-Insaf
- In office 15 July 2023 – 30 November 2023
- President: Parvez Elahi
- Chairman: Imran Khan
- Vice Chairman: Shah Mahmood Qureshi
- Succeeded by: Niazullah Niazi

Member of the National Assembly of Pakistan
- Incumbent
- Assumed office 29 February 2024
- Preceded by: Sher Akbar Khan
- Constituency: NA-10 Buner
- Majority: 78,898 (39.21%)

Personal details
- Born: 15 April 1971 (age 55) Buner District, Khyber Pakhtunkhwa, Pakistan
- Party: PTI (since 2022)
- Other political affiliations: PPP (2004–2009)
- Education: University of Wolverhampton; University of Washington
- Profession: Politician; barrister

Gohar Ali Khan (Note: Urdu: گوہر علی خان, Pashto: ګوهر علي خان) (born 15 April 1971) is a Pakistani politician and barrister who has served as the chairman of the Pakistan Tehreek-e-Insaf (PTI) since December 2023. He has also been serving as a member of the National Assembly of Pakistan since February 2024. He previously served as the PTI's chief election commissioner from July 2023 to November 2023. As an attorney, Khan has aided former prime minister Imran Khan, his predecessor as chairman of the PTI, in his legal cases.

Prior to joining the PTI in 2022, he was affiliated with the PPP for 5 years. He had contested the 2008 Pakistani general election as a member of the PPP however ended up being a runner-up. As an attorney, he notably participated in the Lawyers' Movement in 2007, a popular mass protest movement against the Suspension of Iftikhar Muhammad Chaudhry of Chief Justice Iftikhar Muhammad Chaudhry.

Khan is considered close to Aitzaz Ahsan and to businessman Malik Riaz, having served as his legal adviser.

== Early life and education ==
Khan was born on 15 April 1971 in Buner, Khyber Pakhtunkhwa into a Pashtun family of the Yusufzai tribe. His father, Abdur Rauf Khan, originally from Buner, served twice as a member of the Provincial Assembly of the North-West Frontier Province and was the first ever legislative member of the Parliament from Buner. He has two elder brothers and one younger to him.

He moved to the United Kingdom to pursue his LLB degree at the University of Wolverhampton in 1997. He was then called to the Bar of England and Wales by the Honourable Society of Lincoln's Inn in 2001. He also obtained his LLM degree at the University of Washington School of Law in 2004.

== Legal career ==
Associated with the law firm Aitzaz Ahsan and Associates, he started his legal career in Pakistan under the guidance of renowned lawyer Aitzaz Ahsan. He achieved a significant milestone in his legal career when he became involved in the Lawyers' Movement in 2007. He also assisted in the case of the restoration of Chief Justice Iftikhar Muhmmad Chaudhry.

After joining the PTI, he fought several cases for the party, such as the PTI foreign funding case, and Imran Khan's contempt of the Election Commission of Pakistan case. He also was one of the lawyers representing PTI in the Reserved seats case alongside Salman Akram Raja.

Khan also has experience in civil and criminal trials, and he has appeared before the Supreme Judicial Council, the Field General Court Martial, and its Court of Appeals.

== Political career ==
=== Pakistan People's Party (2004–2009) ===
He ran for the National Assembly of Pakistan from NA-28 Buner as a candidate of the Pakistan People's Party (PPP) in the 2008 Pakistani general election, but ended up as a runner up. He received 27,532 votes and Abdul Matin Khan, succeeded as candidate of the Awami National Party (ANP).

=== Pakistan Tehreek-e-Insaf (2022–present) ===
On 15 July 2023, he was appointed as the Chief Election Commissioner of the PTI. He held this position till he resigned on 30 November 2023 due to his nomination for the party's chairmanship.

On 2 December 2023, he was elected to the chairmanship of the PTI. Imran Khan, the previous chairman, decided not to contest due to legal troubles in the Toshakhana reference case.

On 22 December 2023, he was removed from chairmanship of the PTI due to the party's intra-party elections being declared null and void by Election Commission of Pakistan. However, the order of his removal was suspended by Peshawar High Court on 26 December 2023.

On 22 February 2024, it was announced by Gohar himself that new elections would be held for the post on 3 March with Barrister Ali Zafar as Gohar's nominee for the post. However, Ali Zafar did not accept the nomination and thus Gohar filed to re-contest the chairmanship elections as he had been nominated by Imran Khan. Three more candidates filed nomination forms to contest. One nomination form was rejected while the other two were accepted. The two candidates, one from Karachi and the other one from Balochistan withdrew their candidature. Therefore Gohar was announced by the Returning Officer as 'elected unopposed'. The date for official declaration of the result was 3 March 2024.

==== Chairman of Pakistan Tehreek-e-Insaf ====
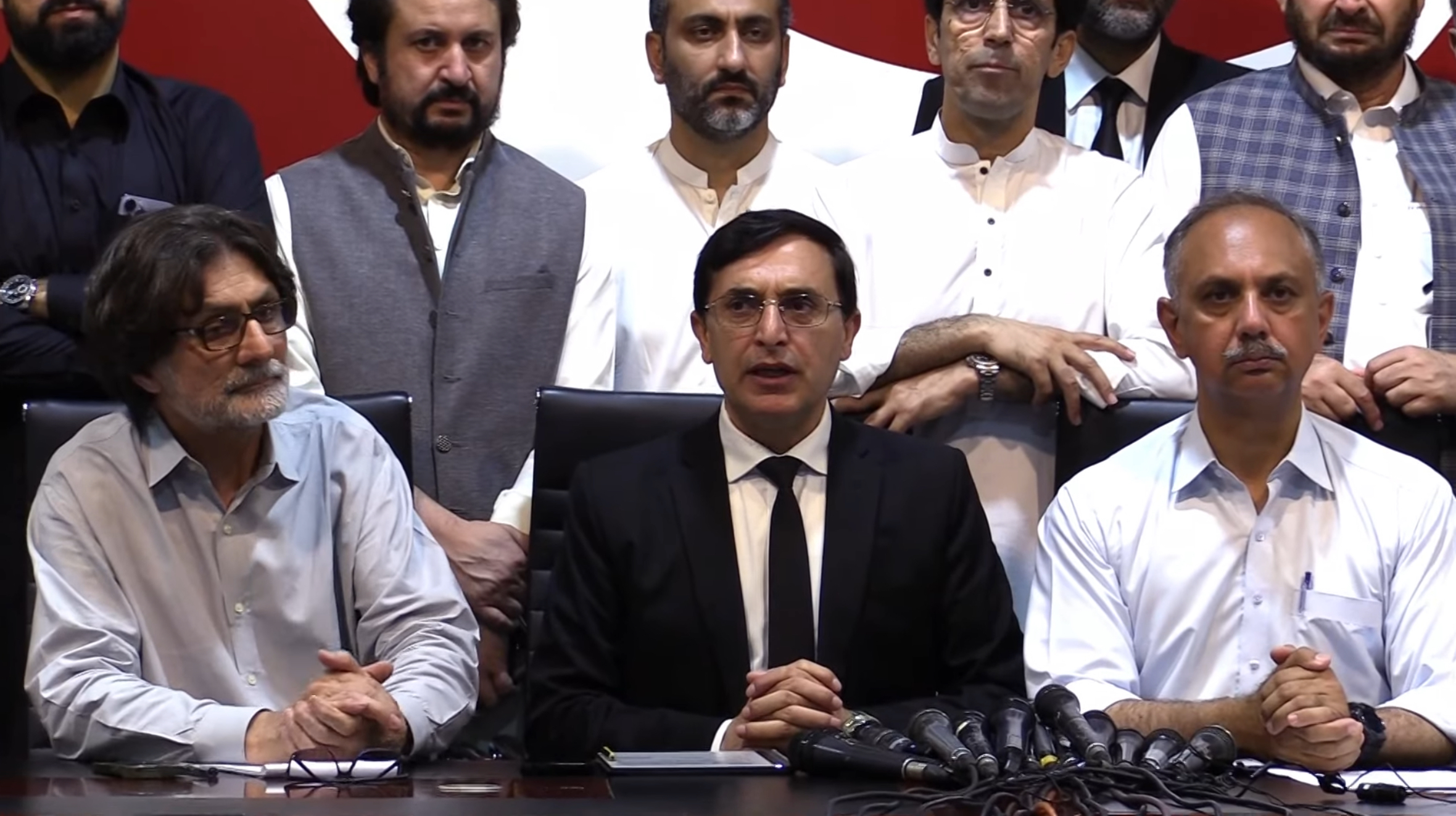
Gohar chairs a Pakistan Tehreek-e-Insaf leadership conference with Raoof Hasan and Omar Ayub in June 2024.

As chairman of Pakistan Tehreek-e-Insaf (PTI), he addressed legal affairs, internal party issues and plans for the party's political actions on orders of PTI founder Imran Khan through press conferences and party statements. Gohar Khan oversaw the Reserved seats case and Iddat case as chairman. In both cases, Gohar clarified that he considered the cases' outcomes as a major victory for PTI and Pakistan as a whole. Gohar primarily calls for the immediate release of Imran Khan, who he has said is unlawfully imprisoned.

He also criticized the government of Shehbaz Sharif for allowing the Inter-Services Intelligence (ISI) to tap phones which he declared 'unconstitutional'. He further demanded a notification by the Supreme Court of Pakistan regarding the next Chief Justice of Pakistan to be issued, while also demanded that Chief Justice Qazi Faez Isa be denied an extension. He oversaw major reshuffles in party leadership including the resignation of Omar Ayub Khan as Secretary-General of PTI, the appointment of Salman Akram Raja to the role, a show-cause notice to Sher Afzal Marwat, and the appointment of Sheikh Waqas Akram as Information Secretary, all of which were appointments made on advice and orders of Imran Khan, who Gohar has met on several instances in Adiala Jail.

In June 2024, reports began of 27 PTI-backed Sunni Ittehad MNAs resigning from the National Assembly in protest against party leadership and criticism from other party leaders including Sher Afzal Marwat, Shehryar Afridi, Shandana Gulzar and ex-PTI leader Fawad Chaudhry. According to reports, 21 of these MNAs displayed their intention to establish a "forward bloc" due to the party leadership (mainly Gohar, Omar Ayub and Shibli Faraz)'s failure to release Imran Khan from his imprisonment. In response to this, Gohar called for Omar Ayub to be reinstated as Secretary-General, while also denied any rumors of a forward bloc in the party.

In September 2024, he oversaw major protests held by PTI in Islamabad, in which he was arrested and released on the same day on 10 September 2024. He also criticized the PMLN and PPP government for the plan to enact new constitutional amendments which would affect the Judiciary. Gohar stated that "The government seeks to isolate the judiciary through these amendments, without the mandate to do so," and also proclaimed it an attack on the judiciary. Furthermore, in response to the proposed amendments he led meetings between PTI and JUI-F leader Fazal-ur-Rehman to oppose the amendments.
