= Shahid Ahmed Khattak =

Pakistani politician

- شاہد احمد خٹک

Member of the National Assembly of Pakistan
- Incumbent
- Assumed office 29 February 2024
- Constituency: NA-38 Karak
- In office 13 August 2018 – 20 January 2023
- Constituency: NA-34 (Karak)

President of PTI South Khyber Pakhtunkhwa
- Incumbent
- Assumed office 16 January 2023
- Chairman: Imran Khan; Gohar Ali Khan

Personal details
- Party: PTI (2018-present)

Shahid Ahmed Khattak is a Pakistani politician who has been a member of the National Assembly of Pakistan since February 2024. He previously served as a member from August 2018 till January 2023.

== Political career ==
He was elected to the National Assembly of Pakistan as a candidate of Pakistan Tehreek-e-Insaf (PTI) from Constituency NA-34 (Karak) in the 2018 Pakistani general election. He received 77,181 votes and defeated Nawabzada Mohsin Ali Khan, a candidate of Pakistan Peoples Party (PPP).
