= Nasir Khan Khattak =

Pakistani politician

- ناصر خان خٹک

Member of the National Assembly of Pakistan
- In office 1 June 2013 – 31 May 2018
- Constituency: NA-15 (Karak)

Personal details
- Born: 9 February 1966 (age 60)

Nasir Khan Khattak (Urdu: ناصر خان خٹک; born 9 February 1966) is a Pakistani politician who had been a member of the National Assembly of Pakistan, from June 2013 to May 2018.

== Early life ==
He was born on 9 February 1966.

== Political career ==
Khattak was elected to the National Assembly of Pakistan as a candidate of Pakistan Tehreek-e-Insaf from Constituency NA-15 (Karak) in the 2013 Pakistani general election. He received 51,481 votes and defeated a candidate of Pakistan Muslim League (N).

In 2014, Imran Khan asked Speaker of the National Assembly Sardar Ayaz Sadiq to disqualify Khattak from the membership of the National Assembly for violating party's discipline. In December, 2016, Khattak was expelled from the PTI for violating party discipline. They alleged ex MNA has been accused for running a substandard medical college called Al-Riaz Medical College in Peshawar and the college has still not been granted recognition by Pakistan medical and dental council.

In April 2018, he joined Jamiat Ulema-e Islam (F).
