= Electoral history of Nawaz Sharif =

Elections featuring Prime Minister of Pakistan

This is a summary of the electoral history of Nawaz Sharif, who was Prime Minister of Pakistan from 1990 to 1993 and again from 1997 to 1999 and then again from 2013 to 2017 and Leader of the Pakistan Muslim League (N) from 1993 to 1999 and again from 2011 to August 2017 and then again from October 2017 to February 2018. He was a member of the Provincial Assembly of the Punjab and National Assembly of Pakistan (MNA) for Lahore.

== Pakistani general elections ==
=== 1988 general election ===
Party	Votes	%	Seats
Pakistan People's Party	7,546,561	38.5	94
Islami Jamhoori Ittehad	5,908,741	30.2	56
Pakistan Awami Ittehad	848,119	4.2	3
Awami National Party	409,555	2.1	2
Jamiat Ulema-e-Islam (Fazl-ur-Rehman)	360,526	1.8	7
Punjabi Pakhtun Ittehad	105,061	0.5	0
Pakistan National Party	104,442	0.5	0
National Peoples Party (Khar)	97,363	0.5	1
Pakistan Democratic Party	80,743	0.4	1
Balochistan National Alliance	59,248	0.3	2
Pakistan Muslim League	55,052	0.3	0
Pakistan Milli Awai Ittehad	46,562	0.2	0
Jamiat Ulema-e-Islam (Darkhasti)	44,964	0.2	1
Tehrik-e-Jafaria (Arif Hussaini)	42,261	0.2	0
15 other parties	51,656	0.3	0
Independents	3,829,705	19.5	40
Invalid/blank votes	313,926	–	–
Total	19,904,440	100	207
Source: Nohlen et al.

=== 1990 general election ===
Parties	Votes	%	Seats	+/–
Islami Jamhoori Ittehad	7,908,513	37.4	106	+50
People's Democratic Alliance	7,795,218	36.8	44	New
Haq Parast	1,172,525	5.5	15	New
Jamiat Ulema-e-Islam	622,214	2.9	6	−1
Awami National Party	356,160	1.7	6	+4
Jamiat Ulema-e-Pakistan (Noorani)	310,953	1.5	3	New
Pakistan Awami Tehrik	237,492	1.1	0	New
Jamhoori Wattan Party	129,431	0.6	2	New
Pakistan National Party	127,287	0.6	2	+2
Pakhtun-khwa Milli Awami Party	73,635	0.3	1	New
Sindh National Front	51,990	0.2	0	New
Pakistan Democratic Party	51,645	0.2	0	0
Balochistan National Movement	51,297	0.2	0	New
Sindh National Alliance	31,125	0.1	0	New
13 other parties	64,470	0.3	0	–
Independents	2,179,956	10.3	22	−18
Invalid/blank votes	231,568	–	–	–
Total	21,395,479	100	207	0
Source: Nohlen et al.

=== 1993 general election ===
Parties	Votes	%	Seats	+/–
Pakistan Muslim League (N)	7,980,229	39.9	73	New
Pakistan Peoples Party	7,578,635	37.9	89	New
Pakistan Muslim League (J)	781,652	3.9	6	New
Pakistan Islamic Front	645,278	3.2	3	New
Islamic Jamhoori Mahaz	480,099	2.4	4	New
Awami National Party	335,094	1.7	3	–3
Mutehda Deeni Mahaz	216,937	1.1	2	New
Pakhtun-khwa Milli Awami Party	97,541	0.5	3	+2
National Democratic Alliance	64,713	0.3	1	New
Jamhoori Wattan Party	54,607	0.3	2	0
Pakhtun-khwa Qaumi Party	54,144	0.3	1	New
National Peoples Party (Khar)	48,721	0.2	1	New
Balochistan National Movement (Hayee)	47,648	0.2	1	New
Balochistan National Movement (Mengal)	45,228	0.2	1	New
Other parties	107,979	0.5	0	–
Independents	1,482,033	7.4	16	–6
Invalid/blank votes	272,769	–	–	–
Total	20,293,307	100	207	0
Source: Nohlen et al.

=== 1997 general election ===
Results as reported by news sources.

Parties	Votes	%	Seats	+/–
Pakistan Muslim League (N)	8,751,793	45.9	137	+64
Pakistan Peoples Party	4,152,209	21.8	18	–71
Haq Parast	764,207	4.0	12	New
Pakistan Muslim League (J)	624,286	3.3	0	–6
Awami National Party	357,002	1.9	10	+7
Pakistan Peoples Party (Shaheed Bhutto)	377,228	2.0	1	New
Jamiat Ulema-e-Islam (F)	325,910	1.7	2	New
Pakistan Tehreek-e-Insaf	314,820	1.7	0	New
Balochistan National Party	124,754	0.7	3	New
National Peoples Party (Khar)	85,121	0.4	1	0
Balochistan National Movement	72,354	0.4	0	New
Jamhoori Wattan Party	66,128	0.3	2	0
Muslim Ittehad Pakistan	49,601	0.3	0	New
Jamiat Ulema-e-Islam (S)	48,838	0.3	0	New
Pakistan Democratic Party	47,153	0.2	0	New
Muslim League (Qayyum)	37,723	0.2	0	New
Pakistan Awami Party	31,615	0.2	0	New
30 other parties	88,429	0.5	0	–
Independents	1,482,033	7.4	21	+5
Invalid/blank votes	448,829	–	–	–
Total	19,516,716	100	207	0
Source: Nohlen et al.

=== 2013 general election ===
Party	Vote	%	Seats				
Party	Vote	%	General	Women	Minorities	Total	+/–
Pakistan Muslim League (N)	14,874,104	32.77	126	34	6	166^{[a]}	
Pakistan Tehreek-e-Insaf	7,679,954	16.92	28	6	1	35	
Pakistan Peoples Party	6,911,218	15.23	33	8	1	42	
Muttahida Qaumi Movement	2,456,153	5.41	19	4	1	24	
Jamiat Ulema-e-Islam (F)	1,461,371	3.22	11	3	1	15	
Pakistan Muslim League (Q)	1,409,905	3.11	2	0	0	2	
Pakistan Muslim League (F)	1,072,846	2.36	5	1	0	6	
Jamaat-e-Islami	963,909	2.12	3	1	0	4	
Awami National Party	453,057	1.00	2	0	0	3	
Mutahida Deeni Mahaz	360,297	0.79	0	0	0	0	
Pakhtun-khwa Milli Awami Party	214,631	0.47	3	1	0	4	
National Peoples Party	197,829	0.44	2	1	0	3	
Pakistan Muslim League (Z)	128,510	0.28	1	0	0	1	
Bahawalpur National Awami Party	113,365	0.25	0	0	0	0	
Jamiat Ulama-e-Islam Nazryati	103,098	0.23	0	0	0	0	
Awami Muslim League	93,046	0.20	1	0	0	1	
Sindh United Party	82,634	0.18	0	0	0	0	
Tehreek-e-Tahaffuz-e-Pakistan	76,358	0.17	0	0	0	0	
Pakistan Muslim League (J)	71,773	0.16	0	0	0	0	
Awami Jamhuri Ittehad Pakistan	71,175	0.16	1	0	0	1	
Jamiat Ulema-e-Pakistan	67,966	0.15	0	0	0	0	
Balochistan National Party	63,979	0.14	1	0	0	1	
National Party (Pakistan)	61,148	0.13	1	0	0	1	
All Pakistan Muslim League	54,231	0.12	1	0	0	1	
Pakistan National Muslim League	52,398	0.12	0	0	0	0	
Pakistan Peoples Party (Shaheed Bhutto)	50,046	0.11	0	0	0	0	
Qaumi Watan Party	46,574	0.10	1	0	0	1	
Tehreek-e-Suba Hazara	43,265	0.10	0	0	0	0	
Majlis-e-Wahdat-e-Muslimeen	41,520	0.09	0	0	0	0	
Sunni Ittehad Council	37,732	0.08	0	0	0	0	
Sunni Tehreek	25,485	0.06	0	0	0	0	
Sindh Taraqi Passand Party	23,397	0.05	0	0	0	0	
Qoumi Wattan Party	19,253	0.04	0	0	0	0	
Awami Workers Party	18,650	0.04	0	0	0	0	
Balochistan National Party (Awami)	12,866	0.03	0	0	0	0	
Hazara Democratic Party	11,052	0.02	0	0	0	0	
Mohajir Qaumi Movement	10,575	0.02	0	0	0	0	
Jamote Qaumi Movement	10,468	0.02	0	0	0	0	
Saraiki Party	5,236	0.01	0	0	0	0	
Kissan Ittehad	4,367	0.01	0	0	0	0	
Falah Party	4,207	0.01	0	0	0	0	
Awami Justice Party	3,803	0.01	0	0	0	0	
Pakistan Justice Party	3,230	0.01	0	0	0	0	
Islamli Tehreek	2,694	0.01	0	0	0	0	
Christian Progressive Movement	2,523	0.01	0	0	0	0	
Mohib-e-Wattan Nowjawan Inqilabion Ki Anjuman	2,503	0.01	0	0	0	0	
Mutahidda Qabil Party	2,399	0.01	0	0	0	0	
Qaumi Tahaffaz Party	2,202	0.00	0	0	0	0	
Mustaqbil Pakistan	2,052	0.00	0	0	0	0	
Sairkistan Qaumi Ittehad	1,890	0.00	0	0	0	0	
Seraiki Sooba Movement	1,797	0.00	0	0	0	0	
Awami Workers Party	1,657	0.00	0	0	0	0	
Jamhoori Wattan Party	1,632	0.00	0	0	0	0	
Karwan-i-Millat	1,412	0.00	0	0	0	0	
Jannat Pakistan Party	1,269	0.00	0	0	0	0	
Tehreek Tabdili Nizam	1,164	0.00	0	0	0	0	
Pakistan Muslim League (SB)	1,063	0.00	0	0	0	0	
Pakistan Insani Haqook Party	989	0.00	0	0	0	0	
Pakistan Patriotic Movement	948	0.00	0	0	0	0	
Pakistan Muslim League (S)	890	0.00	0	0	0	0	
Markazi Jamiat Mushaikh	833	0.00	0	0	0	0	
Pakistan Conservative Party	794	0.00	0	0	0	0	
Tehreek-e-Istehkaam	651	0.00	0	0	0	0	
Islamic Republican Party	631	0.00	0	0	0	0	
Pakistan Tehrek-e-Inqalab	593	0.00	0	0	0	0	
Tehreek-e-Ittehad Ummat	583	0.00	0	0	0	0	
Pak Justice Party	537	0.00	0	0	0	0	
Pakistan Freedom Party	502	0.00	0	0	0	0	
Roshan Pakistan Muhaibban Wattan Party	493	0.00	0	0	0	0	
Pakistan Muslim League (H)	472	0.00	0	0	0	0	
Mutahida Baloch Movement	471	0.00	0	0	0	0	
Menecracy Action Party	447	0.00	0	0	0	0	
Awami Himayat Tehreek	330	0.00	0	0	0	0	
Islami Inqalab Party	274	0.00	0	0	0	0	
Pakistan Human Rights Party	266	0.00	0	0	0	0	
Jamiat Ulama-e-Islam (S)	258	0.00	0	0	0	0	
Pakistan Gharib Party	256	0.00	0	0	0	0	
Sindh Dost Ittehad Party	250	0.00	0	0	0	0	
Istehkaam-e-Pakistan	240	0.00	0	0	0	0	
Pak Wattan Party	220	0.00	0	0	0	0	
Istiqlal Party	218	0.00	0	0	0	0	
Hazara Awami Ittehad	214	0.00	0	0	0	0	
Pakistan National Democratic Party	191	0.00	0	0	0	0	
Communist Party of Pakistan	191	0.00	0	0	0	0	
Ghareeb Awam Party	174	0.00	0	0	0	0	
Pakistan Muslim League (M)	172	0.00	0	0	0	0	
Pakistan Muslim League (C)	152	0.00	0	0	0	0	
Afgan Qomi Movement	152	0.00	0	0	0	0	
Pakistan Brohi Party	149	0.00	0	0	0	0	
Pakistan Muhajir League	134	0.00	0	0	0	0	
Pakistan Muhafiz Watan Party	126	0.00	0	0	0	0	
Azad Pakistan Party	116	0.00	0	0	0	0	
Pakistan Muslim League (Zehri)	101	0.00	0	0	0	0	
Tehrik-e-Masawaat	99	0.00	0	0	0	0	
All Pakistan Bayrozgar Party	89	0.00	0	0	0	0	
Pakistan Aman Party	71	0.00	0	0	0	0	
Mutthuda Majlis-e-Amal	69	0.00	0	0	0	0	
Pakistan Motherland Party	68	0.00	0	0	0	0	
Pakistan Muslim League (H)	64	0.00	0	0	0	0	
Pakistan Qaumi Party	55	0.00	0	0	0	0	
Pakistan Islami Justice Party	54	0.00	0	0	0	0	
Tehreek-e-Wafaq	48	0.00	0	0	0	0	
Salam Pakistan Party	34	0.00	0	0	0	0	
Aap Janab Sarkar Party	30	0.00	0	0	0	0	
Jamiat Ulma-e-Pakistan (Niazi)	27	0.00	0	0	0	0	
Pakistan Muhammadi Party	24	0.00	0	0	0	0	
Aalay Kalam Ullah Farman Rasool	15	0.00	0	0	0	0	
All Pakistan Youth Working Party	14	0.00	0	0	0	0	
Punjab National Party	13	0.00	0	0	0	0	
Pakistan Awami Quwat Party	9	0.00	0	0	0	0	
Pakistan Awami Inqalab	7	0.00	0	0	0	0	
Independents	5,880,658	12.96	27	0	0	27^{[a]}	
Repoll ordered	–	–	3	–	–	3	
Postponed/terminated/withheld	–	–	5	–	1	6	
Total	45,388,404	100	272	60	10	342	
Registered voters/turnout	84,207,524	55.02	–	–	–	–	–
Source: ECP (elected seats), ECP (minority seats), ECP (women seats), ECP (votes)
