= Istiqbal Khan =

Pakistani politician

Member of the National Assembly of Pakistan
- In office 2008–2013
- Constituency: NA-28 (Buner)

Personal details
- Party: Jamiat Ulema-e Islam (F) (since 2013)
- Other political affiliations: Awami National Party (2008-2013)
- Parent: Abdul Matin Khan (father)

Istiqbal Khan is a Pakistani politician who had been a member of the National Assembly of Pakistan from 2008 to 2013. He is from Bajkata Village of Buner, Pakistan. Istiqbal Khan is the son of the late Abdul Matin Khan, who was also elected to the National Assembly three times on an ANP ticket.

== Political career ==
He was elected to the National Assembly of Pakistan from Constituency NA-28 (Buner) as a candidate of Awami National Party (ANP) in by-polls held in 2008. He received 30,903 votes and defeated an independent candidate, Bakht Jehan Khan.

In November 2010, he was inducted into the federal cabinet of Prime Minister Yousaf Raza Gillani and was made minister of state without any portfolio until February 2011. He also served as special assistant to the prime minister of Pakistan with the status of minister of state.

In 2013, he left ANP and joined Jamiat Ulema-e Islam (F) (JUI-F).
