= Sher Akbar Khan =

Pakistani politician (born 1957)

- شیر اکبر خان

Member of the National Assembly of Pakistan
- In office 13 August 2018 – 20 January 2023
- Constituency: NA-9 (Buner)
- In office 1 June 2013 – 31 May 2018
- Constituency: NA-28 (Buner)
- In office 18 November 2002 – 18 November 2007
- Constituency: NA-28 (Buner)

Personal details
- Born: 1 April 1957 (age 69) Buner, Khyber Pakhtun Khawa, Pakistan
- Party: PTI-P (2023-present)
- Other political affiliations: PTI (2017-2023); JI (2013-2017); QWP (2002-2013); PPP (1997-2002)

Sher Akbar Khan (Urdu: شیر اکبر خان; born 1 April 1957) is a Pakistani politician who had been a member of the National Assembly of Pakistan from August 2018 till January 2023. Previously he was a member of the National Assembly from 2002 to 2007 and again from June 2013 to May 2018.

== Early life ==
He was born on 1 April 1957.

== Political career ==
He contested the 1997 North-West Frontier Province provincial election as a candidate of the Pakistan People's Party (PPP) from PF-63 Swat-I, but was unsuccessful. He received 3,383 votes and was defeated by Muhammad Kareem, a candidate of the Awami National Party (ANP).

He was elected to the National Assembly of Pakistan as a candidate of Pakistan Peoples Party (Sherpao) (PPP–S) from Constituency NA-28 (Buner) in 2002 Pakistani general election. He received 34,224 votes and defeated Abdul Matin Khan, a candidate of the ANP.

Khan ran for the seat of the National Assembly as a candidate of PPP–S from Constituency NA-28 (Buner) in the 2008 Pakistani general election but was unsuccessful. He received 17,241 votes and lost the seat to Abdul Matin Khan, a candidate of the ANP.

Khan was re-elected to the National Assembly as a candidate of Jamaat-e-Islami Pakistan (JI) from Constituency NA-28 (Buner) in the 2013 Pakistani general election. He received 29,170 votes and defeated Mian Moin Uddin, a candidate of the Pakistan Tehreek-e-Insaf (PTI).

In October 2017, he quit JI and joined the PTI.

He was re-elected to the National Assembly as a candidate of PTI from Constituency NA-9 (Buner) in the 2018 Pakistani general election. He received 58,037 votes and defeated Kamran Khan, a candidate of Pakistan Muslim League (N) (PML-N).

== See More ==
- No-confidence motion against Imran Khan
