= NA-38 Karak =

Constituency of the National Assembly of Pakistan

- Constituency for the National Assembly of Pakistan
- Region: Karak District
- Electorate: 486,754

Current constituency
- Party: Pakistan Tehreek-e-Insaf
- Member: Shahid Ahmed Khattak
- Created from: NA-15 Karak

NA-38 Karak (این اے-38، کرک) is a constituency for the National Assembly of Pakistan. It covers whole of district Karak. The constituency was formerly known as NA-15 Karak from 1977 to 2018. The name changed to NA-34 Karak after the delimitation in 2018 and to NA-38 Karak after the delimitation in 2022.

== Members of Parliament ==
=== 1977–2002: NA-15 Karak ===
Election	Member	Party
1977	M. Haneef Khan	PPP
1985	Al-Haj Syed Qasim Shah	Independent
1988	Nawabzada Salahuddin Saeed	PPP
1990	Nawabzada Salahuddin Saeed	IJI
1993	Nawabzada Salahuddin Saeed	PML-N
1997	Nawabzada Salahuddin Saeed	PML-N

=== 2002–2018: NA-15 Karak ===
Election	Member	Party
2002	Shah Abdul Aziz	MMA
2008	Mufti Ajmal Khan	MMA
2013	Nasir Khan Khattak	PTI

=== 2018–2022: NA-34 Karak ===
Election	Member	Party
2018	Shahid Ahmed Khattak	PTI

=== 2023–present: NA-38 Karak ===
Election	Member	Party
2024	Shahid Ahmed Khattak	PTI

== Elections since 2002 ==
=== 2002 general election ===
2002 General Election: NA-15 Karak
Party	Candidate	Votes	%	±%
MMA	Shah Abdul Aziz	31,325	32.75	
PPPP	Masood Sharif Khattak	17,712	18.52	
PML-N	Rehmat Salam	13,381	13.99	
PTI	Imran Khan	9,972	10.43	
Independent	Mufti Ajmal Khan	9,443	9.87	
ANP	Muhammad Amin Khattak	9,110	9.52	
PPP (S)	Said Ullah Shah	3,237	3.38	
Independent	Zakim Khan	1,113	1.17	
PkMAP	Badshah Jan	193	0.20	
Independent	Farzana Masood	83	0.09	
Independent	Muhammad Iqbal	75	0.08	
Majority		13,613	14.23	
Turnout		95,644	38.74	
MMA gain from PML-N				

A total of 1,780 votes were rejected.

=== 2008 general election ===
2008 General Election: NA-15 Karak
Party	Candidate	Votes	%	±%
MMA	Mufti Ajmal Khan	28,665	25.92	−6.83
PML-N	Shams ur Rehman Khattak	22,053	19.94	+5.95
PML	Muhammad Ayub Khan Khattak	21,497	19.44	
Independent	Nawabzada Mohsin Ali Khan	21,002	18.99	
ANP	Sher Nawaz Khattak	14,808	13.39	+3.87
PPPP	Sher Qanoos Advocate	2,313	2.09	−16.43
MQM	Shahinshah Khuddar	178	0.16	
Independent	Gul Taz Ali Khattak	72	0.07	
Majority		6,612	5.98	
Turnout		110,588	38.78	+0.04
MMA hold		Swing		

A total of 2,636 votes were rejected.

=== 2013 general election ===
2013 General Election: NA-15 Karak
Party	Candidate	Votes	%	±%
PTI	Nasir Khan Khattak	51,481	32.25	
PML-N	Rehmat Salam Khattak	29,815	18.68	−1.26
MDM	Shah Abdul Aziz	29,224	18.31	
Independent	Masood Sharif Khan Khattak	15,678	9.82	
JUI-F	Muhammad Sardar	13,226	8.29	
ANP	Muhammad Sharif Khattak	7,559	4.74	−8.65
JI	Muhammad Tasleem Iqbal	5,105	3.20	
PPPP	Muhammad Shah Jehan	2,263	1.42	−0.67
Independent	Altaf Qadir	1,123	0.71	
Independent	Muhammad Umer	1,097	0.69	
Independent	Munir Khan	572	0.36	
Independent	Asif Noor	453	0.28	
Independent	Shaki Marjan	409	0.26	
PkMAP	Rafi Ullah	387	0.24	
TTP	Muhammad Sadiq	343	0.21	
MQM	Asad Ullah Shah	327	0.20	+0.04
Independent	Shahenshah	211	0.13	
Tehrik-e-Masawaat	Jamal Khan	99	0.06	
JUP-N	Shad Mohammad Khan	93	0.06	
Independent	Altaf Ahmad	83	0.05	
Independent	Shams ur Rehman Khattak	67	0.04	
Millat Party	Mohammad Shah Jehan	0	0.00	
Majority		21,666	13.57	
Turnout		159,615	51.64	+12.86
PTI gain from MMA				

A total of 4,284 votes were rejected.

=== 2018 general election ===
General elections were held on 25 July 2018.

General election 2018: NA-34 Karak
Party	Candidate	Votes	%	±%
PTI	Shahid Ahmed Khattak	77,270	39.63	
MMA	Mir Zaqeem Khan	28,548	14.64	
PPP	Nawabzada Mohsin Ali Khan	28,188	14.46	
JUI-S	Shah Abdul Aziz	16,954	8.70	
PML(N)	Rehmat Salam Khattak	14,431	7.40	
Independent	Gul Sahib Khan	13,626	6.99	
Others	Others (twelve candidates)	15,963	8.19	
Turnout		201,367	49.79	
Total valid votes		194,980	96.83	
Rejected ballots		6,387	3.17	
Majority		48,722	24.99	
Registered electors		404,458		
PTI hold		Swing	N/A	

=== 2024 general election ===
General elections were held on 8 February 2024. Shahid Ahmed Khattak won the election with 117,998 votes.

General election 2024: NA-38 Karak
Party	Candidate	Votes	%	±%
PTI	Shahid Ahmed Khattak (Note: Filed nomination papers as PTI candidate but ECP allowed him to run as an Independent)	117,998	54.56	▲14.93
JUI (F)	Shah Abdul Aziz	40,949	18.94	N/A
Independent	Nawabzada Mohsin Ali Khan	16,538	7.65	N/A
ANP	Hamid Khan Toofan	16,083	7.44	N/A
Others	Others (twenty-seven candidates)	24,690	11.42	
Turnout		221,005	45.40	▼2.29
Total valid votes		216,258	97.85	
Rejected ballots		4,747	2.15	
Majority		77,049	35.63	
Registered electors		486,754		

== See also ==
- NA-37 Kurram
- NA-39 Bannu
