= PS-90 Karachi Korangi-I =

Constituency of the Provincial Assembly of Sindh, Pakistan

- Constituency for the Provincial Assembly of Sindh
- Region: Model Colony of Korangi District in Karachi

Current constituency
- Party: MQM
- Member: Muhammad Hussain Khan
- Created from: PS-121 Karachi-XXXIII (2002-2018); PS-92 Karachi Korangi-I (2018-2023)

PS-90 Karachi Korangi-I (پی ایس-90، کراچی کورنگی-1) is a constituency of the Provincial Assembly of Sindh.

== General elections 2024 ==
Provincial election 2024: PS-90 Karachi Korangi-I
Party	Candidate	Votes	%	±%
MQM-P	Syed Shariq Jamal	35,609	29.66	
PTI	Waqas Iqbal (Note: Filed nomination papers as PTI candidate but ECP allowed him to run as an Independent)	32,645	27.20	
JI	Muhammad Wasim Mirza	27,563	22.96	
TLP	Kashif Ali Khan	9,604	8.00	
Independent	Muhammad Rizwan Chandna	3,780	3.15	
Independent	Ashraf Waheed	2,973	2.48	
PPP	Shabnam Nasir	2,673	2.23	
Others	Others (twenty six candidates)	5,195	4.32	
Turnout		121,442	42.64	
Total valid votes		120,042	98.85	
Rejected ballots		1,400	1.15	
Majority		2,964	2.46	
Registered electors		284,807		
MQM-P hold				

== General elections 2018 ==
Provincial election 2018: PS-92 Karachi Korangi-I
Party	Candidate	Votes	%	±%
MQM-P	Muhammad Hussain Khan	29,889	33.29	
PTI	Abid Jillani	25,643	28.56	
PML(N)	Asmat Anwar	9,851	10.97	
TLP	Muhammad Ashraf Khan	6,989	7.79	
MMA	Muhammad Farooq	5,932	6.61	
PPP	Shahid Khursheed Rana	4,723	5.26	
PSP	Abdul Jalil	3,253	3.62	
Independent	Barkat Ullah Siddiqui	1,028	1.15	
AAT	Moiz Shahzad	572	0.64	
MQM-H	Rida Asim	571	0.64	
Independent	Shafiq Ahmed	289	0.32	
Independent	Aqib Khan	277	0.31	
Independent	Zameer Waheed Jafri	255	0.28	
Independent	Syed Hammad Hussain	159	0.18	
Pakistan Aman Tehreek	Muhammad Arshad Taqi	157	0.17	
Independent	Shahzad Khan	56	0.06	
Independent	Atif Mansoor Butt	52	0.06	
Independent	Muhammad Kashif	50	0.06	
Independent	Syed Khawar Ali Shah	17	0.02	
Independent	Syed Muhammad Rafay	11	0.01	
Majority		4,246	4.73	
Valid ballots		89,774		
Rejected ballots		1,197		
Turnout		90,971		
Registered electors		212,015		
hold				

== General elections 2013 ==
Contesting candidates	Party affiliation	Votes polled
Syed Nadeem Razi	Muttahida Qaumi Movement – Pakistan (MQM-P)	71171
Syed Azhar	Pakistan Tehreek-e-Insaf (PTI)	15540
Mufti Muhammad Ghous Sabri	Jamiat Ulema-e-Pakistan (JUP-N)	3102
Muhammad Tariq Rana	Independent	2658
Syed Khawar Abbas Ali Shah	Pakistan People's Party (PPP-P)	1693
Source: Election Pakistani

== General elections 2008 ==
Contesting candidates	Party affiliation	Votes polled

== See also ==
- PS-89 Karachi Malir-VI
- PS-91 Karachi Korangi-II
