= Torwarsak =

Coordinates: 34°31′N 72°22′E

Torwarsak تورورسک
- Union Council
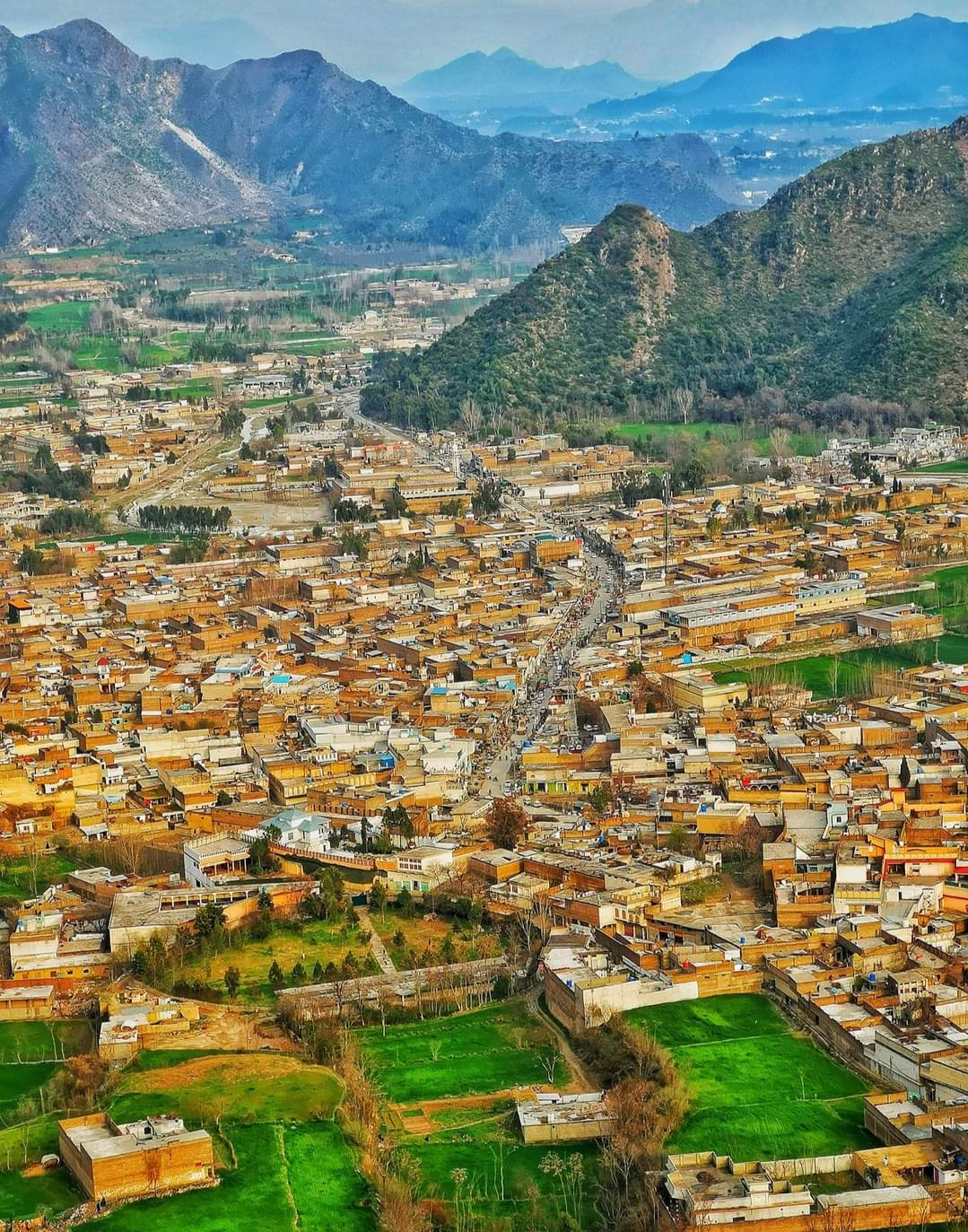
- Torwarsak village in 2020
- Interactive map of Torwarsak
- Country: Pakistan
- Province: Khyber Pakhtunkhwa
- District: Buner

Government
  - Chairman: Maulana Zia Ur Rahman / village 1
  - Chairman: Bakht Faraz / village 2

Population (2023)
  - Total: 39,514
- Time zone: UTC+5 (PST)
- Postal code Torwarsak: 19270
- Area code: 560
- Number of towns: Village Council Torwarsak 1 Village Council Torwarsak 2
- Number of Union Councils: 1 Union Council Torwarsak UCT

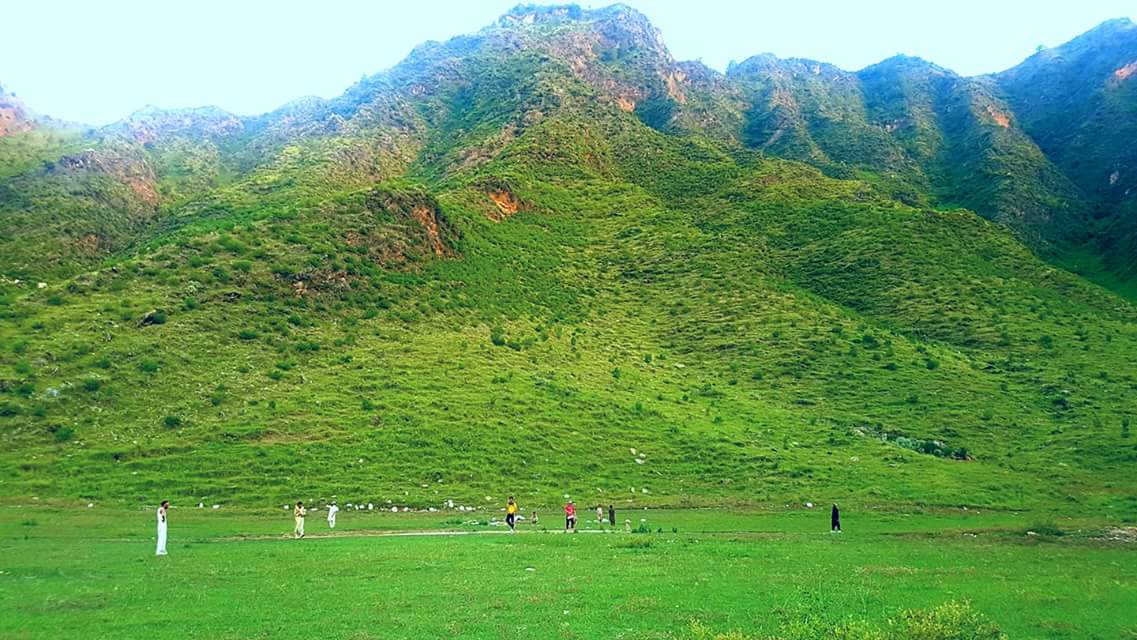
Kala Tangey Mountain ground Shnai

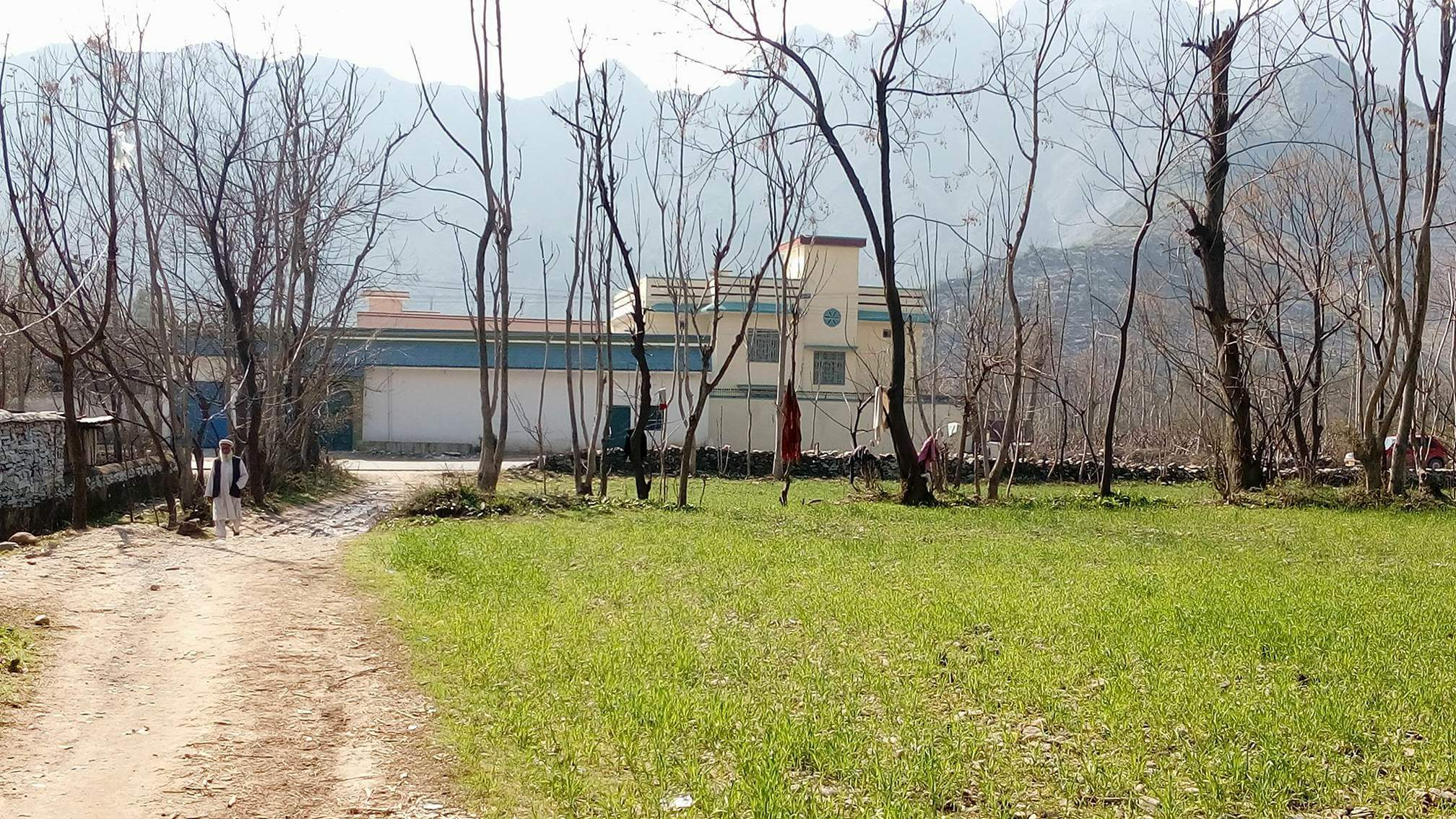
Akbar colony Shnai

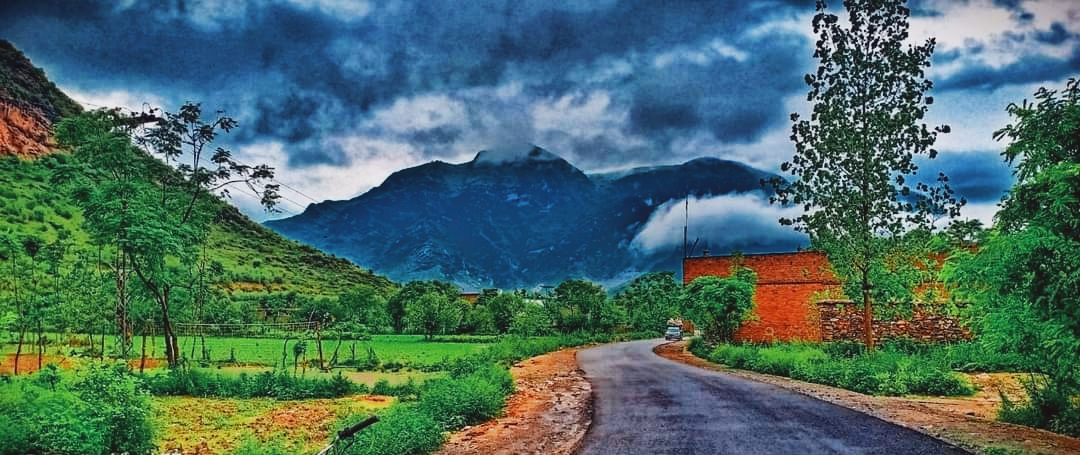
Jangdara Torwarsak

The Torwarsak area of Pakistan is an "administrative unit", known as the Union council of Buner District, located in the Khyber Pakhtunkhwa province of Pakistan.

District Buner has six Tehsils, usually translated as townships. These are Daggar, Chagharzai, Chamla, Totalai, Gagra, and Gadezai. Each tehsil comprises a certain number of union councils. There are 27 union councils in Buner District.

Torwarsak is the most populated union council in Buner. Torwarsak is also known as a religious Town in Buner for Tabligh e Markaz.

== Etymology ==
Torwarsak has two main units, Yakhail and Khadenkhail. Each of these consist of five sub-units.

Yahkhail comprises Shnai, Kotwal, Babar, Musakhel, Sath Khel, and Mula Khel.

Khadenkhail comprises Wastakhail, Chor Hwaidad, Maghwale Ibrakhan, Baba tal, and Sargental.

== Notable people ==
- Fazli Ghafoor (politician)
- Bakht Jehan Khan (former speaker of Khyber Pakhtunkhwa)

== Education ==
- Government Primary School shnai Torwarsak
- Government Middle School shnai Torwarsak
- Buner Public School Shnai Torwarsak
- Government Primary School Ali Sher Torwarsak
- Usmania College shnai Torwarsak
- Buner Education Academy Torwarsak
- Government girls Primary School Torwarsak
- Al-Khalid Public School Torwarsak
- Aftab Public School
- Usmania School & College
- Government Higher Secondary School Torwarsak
- Government High School Torwarsak
- Carvaan Learning Academy and Hostel Torwarsak
- The Bright Nation School Torwarsak

== Hospitals ==
- Buner children Hospital Shnai Torwarsak
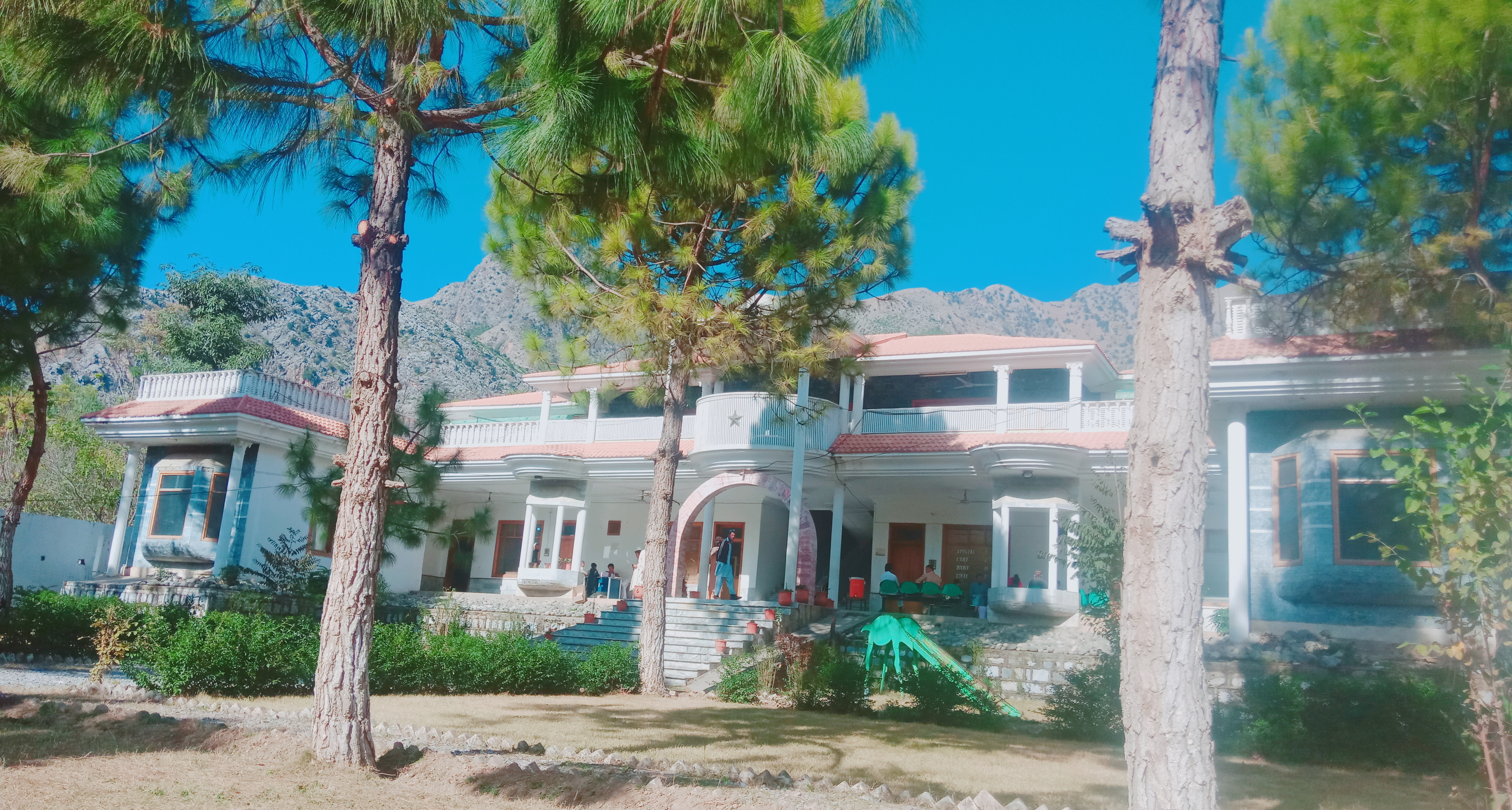
  Buner children hospital Shnai Torwarsak
- BHU shnai Torwarsak
- Dr. Mirza Jehan clinic shnai Torwarsak
- Azeem medical complex Torwarsak
- Dr.fazal wahab Clinic Torwarsak
- Ahmad medical center
- Jan medical center

== Sports ==
- Kala cricket ground shnai Torwarsak
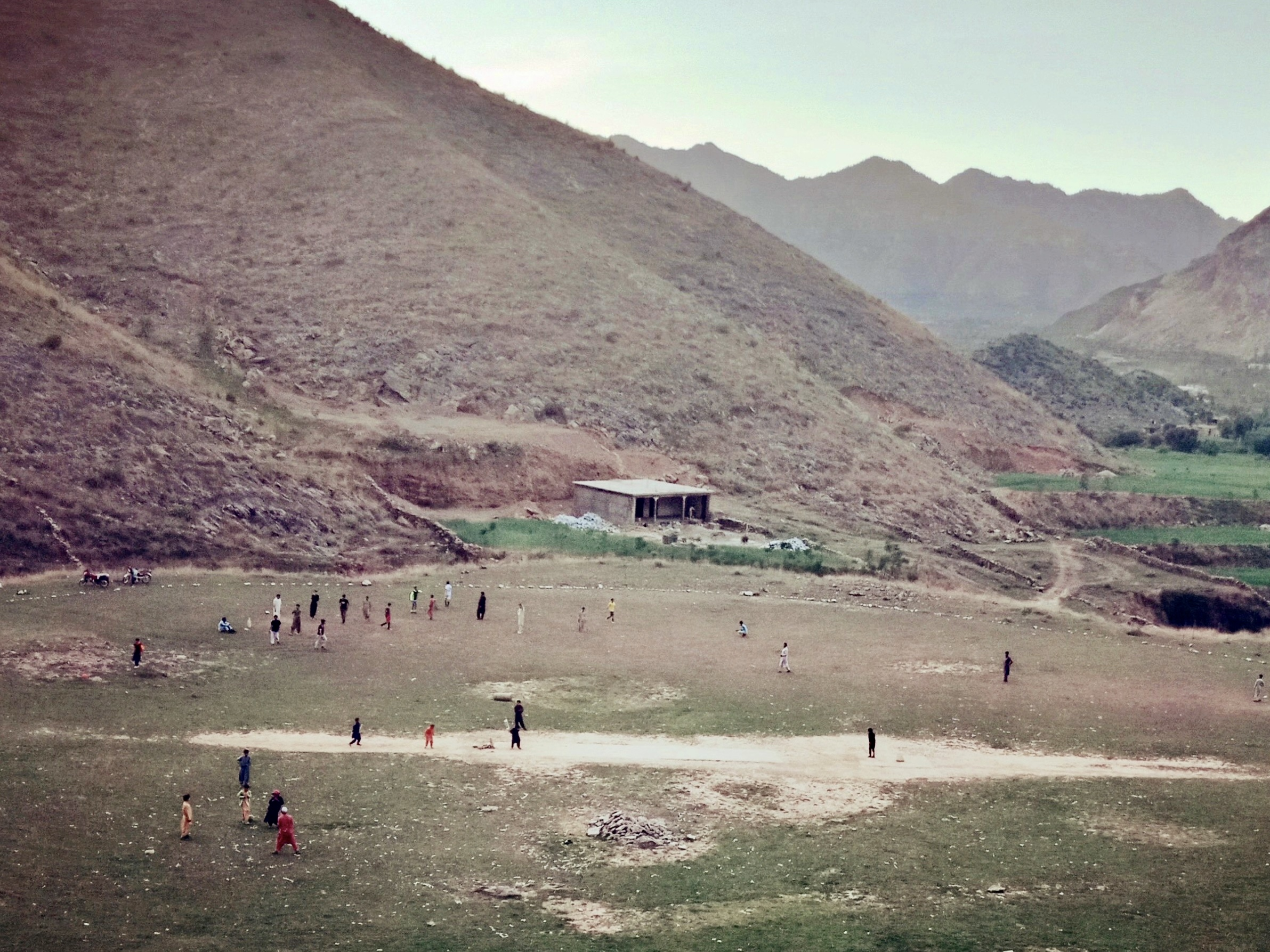
  Kala cricket ground Torwarsak Shnai
- Fazal cricket ground kas Torwarsak
- Markaz ground Torwarsak
- United cricket ground Shnai Torwarsak

== See also ==
- Buner District
