= Muhammad Hussain Khan =

Pakistani politician

Member of the Provincial Assembly of Sindh
- In office 13 August 2018 – 11 August 2023
- Constituency: PS-92 Korangi Karachi-I
- In office August 2013 – 28 May 2018
- Constituency: PS-95 Karachi-VII

Personal details
- Born: 1 June 1962 (age 63) Karachi, Sindh, Pakistan
- Party: MQM-P (2018-present)
- Other political affiliations: MQM-L (2013-2018)

Muhammad Hussain Khan (born 1 June 1962) is a Pakistani politician who had been a member of the Provincial Assembly of Sindh from August 2018 to August 2023. Previously, he was a member of the Provincial Assembly of Sindh from August 2013 to May 2018.

== Early life and education ==
He was born on 1 June 1962 in Mirpurkhas.

He has a degree of Bachelors of Commerce from Sindh University.

== Political career ==
He was elected to the Provincial Assembly of Sindh as a candidate of Mutahida Quami Movement (MQM) from Constituency PS-95 Karachi-VII in by-polls held in August 2013.

He was re-elected to Provincial Assembly of Sindh as a candidate of MQM from PS-92 Korangi Karachi-I in the 2018 Sindh provincial election.
