= Shah Abdul Aziz (politician) =

Pakistani Islamic scholar and politician

Maulana Shah Abdul Aziz

Member of the National Assembly of Pakistan
- In office 16 November 2002 – 2 October 2007
- Constituency: NA-34 (Karak)

Personal life
- Political party: Jamiat Ulema-e-Islam
- Occupation: Islamic scholar, Politician

Religious life
- Religion: Islam
- Denomination: Sunni

Maulana Shah Abdul Aziz (مولانا شاہ عبدالعزیز) is a Pakistani Islamic scholar and politician who served as Member of the 12th National Assembly of Pakistan from 2002 to 2007.

== See also ==
- List of Deobandis
