= Pakistan Justice and Democratic Party =

Pakistani political party

Pakistan Justice and Democratic Party پاکستان جسٹس وڈیموکریٹک پارٹی
- Abbreviation: PJDP
- President: Iftikhar Muhammad Chaudhry
- Founded: December 25, 2015
- Headquarters: Islamabad

Election symbol
- Gavel

Party flag
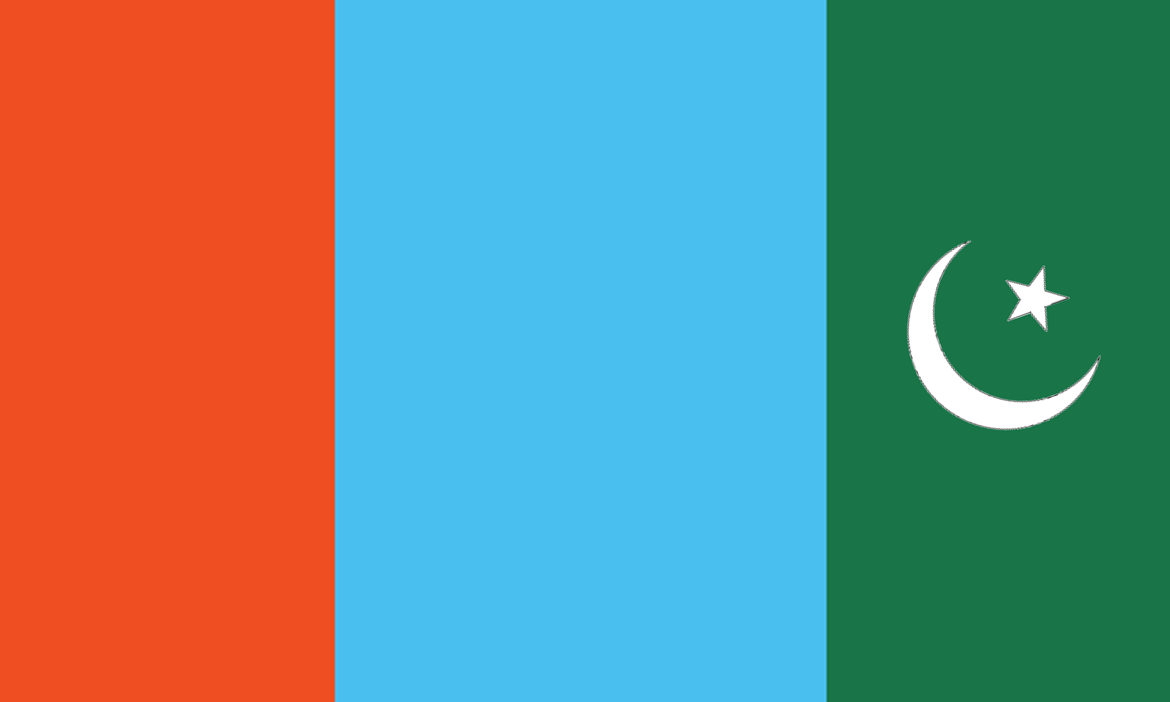

Pakistan Justice and Democratic Party (PJDP, Urdu: پاکستان جسٹس وڈیموکریٹک پارٹی, romanized: Pakstan justis o demokratik paarti, lit. 'Pakistan Justice and Democratic Party') is a Pakistani political party launched on 25 December 2015 by Iftikhar Muhammad Chaudhry, former Chief Justice of Pakistan.

== Office bearers ==
1. Justice (r) Iftikhar Muhammad Chaudhry - President

2. Sheikh Ahsan Ud Din Adv - Sr. Vice President

3. Abdul Wahab Baloch - General Secretary

4. Saliheen Mughal Adv - Vice President ICT

5. Muhammad Badar Ud Duja - Secretary Central Secretariat, Media Coordinator/Social Media

6. Malik Saleh Adv - Vice President Rawalpindi, Punjab Organisations Committee

7. Mahram Khan - becoming a member of NA 57 and party Organizer of Fatehjang

8. Fahmida Butt - Central Secretary Information

9. Aamir Mughal Adv - Central Finance Secretary
