= Mian Ejaz Shafi =

Former Member of the National Assembly of Pakistan

Mian Ejaz Shafi (died 2004) was a Pakistani industrialist and politician who served as a member of the National Assembly of Pakistan from 1997 to 1999. He was the founder of Diamond Industries Limited and Shaffi Chemical Industries Limited.

== Early life and education ==
Ejaz Shafi was born to a Chinioti business family. His family had a business in Bombay before partition of India, but after the creation of Pakistan, some of the relatives moved to Pakistan while his father remained in India. He claimed that he passed Intermediate of Arts and Bachelor of Arts examinations in 1964 and 1966 respectively from the University of Calcutta but O. S. Adhikari, the Controller of Examination, in 2002 said that the university "had conducted no such examinations in the concerned years."

== Career ==
Ejaz Shafi established Shafi Chemical, a manufacturer of sulphuric acid, in Pakistan. He also founded the Diamond Group of Industries, a major foam manufacturer in Pakistan, and acquired Eagle Cycle.

Later, Shafi joined politics and became a member of the National Assembly of Pakistan in 1997. He also served as the central vice president and chief organizer for Sindh of the Pakistan Muslim League (N) (PML (N)).

However, following the military coup of October 12, 1999, Shafi's businesses faced alleged discriminatory practices due to his affiliation with PML (N) by the Central Board of Revenue regarding duty concessions. This led to heavy losses and the non-viability of some domestic units. Most of their industrial units remained operational, with the exception of one unit at Gadoon Industrial Estate, which was forced to close.
