= Mufti Ajmal Khan =

Pakistani politician

Member of the National Assembly of Pakistan
- In office 2008–2013
- Constituency: NA-15 (Karak)

Mufti Ajmal Khan is a Pakistani politician who had been a member of the National Assembly of Pakistan from 2008 to 2013.

== Political career ==
He ran for the seat of the National Assembly of Pakistan from Constituency NA-15 (Karak) as an independent candidate in the 2002 Pakistani general election but was unsuccessful. He received 9,443 votes and lost the seat to Shah Abdul Aziz, a candidate of Muttahida Majlis-e-Amal (MMA).

He was elected to the National Assembly from Constituency NA-15 (Karak) as a candidate of MMA in the 2008 Pakistani general election. He received 28,665 votes and defeated Shams ur Rehman Khattak, a candidate of Pakistan Muslim League (N) (PML-N). During his tenure as Member of the National Assembly, he served as Parliamentary Secretary for Planning and Development.
