= Abdul Matin Khan =

Pakistani politician

MNA Abdul Matin Khan Member of the National Assembly of Pakistan

Member of the National Assembly of Pakistan
- In office 17 March 2008 – 30 October 2008
- Succeeded by: Istiqbal Khan
- Constituency: NA-28 (Buner)

Personal details
- Born: 1944
- Died: 30 October 2008 (aged 63–64)
- Party: Awami National Party
- Children: Istiqbal Khan
- Education: Jahanzeb College; University of the Punjab; University of Karachi
- Occupation: Politician

Abdul Matin Khan (1944 – 30 October 2008) was a Pakistani politician and three times, member of the National Assembly (MNA) of Pakistan Awami National Party.

Khan was born in Buner in 1944 and graduated from Jahanzeb College, Saidu Sharif, Swat in 1967. He completed his master's in history at Punjab University in 1969. Khan earned his LLB from SM Law College, Karachi, and his master's in political science from the University of Karachi in 1971. After completing his education, Khan joined the prosecution branch of police, but resigned after his elder brother joined the civil service in 1975.

Abdul Matin Khan joined the Awami National Party (ANP) in 1989. He applied for the party ticket in 1990 but the ticket of his constituency went to IJI as ANP was the part of Combined Opposition. Instead, Khan contested the election as an independent candidate and won the election for National Assembly. In 1993, Khan won the National Assembly seat again.

In 1997, Khan was again given the party ticket and he won the election for the third time. He was made Parliamentary Secretary for Social Welfare and Women's Development. Martial Law was imposed in the country in 1999 and no elections were held until 2002. In 2002, he lost to the religo-political alliance MMA, and was returned to the assembly again in 2008. He was tipped as minister of state when he died of a cardiac arrest.

After his death his son Istiqbal Khan, continued his legacy, won election from ANP ticket for MNA and was also Minister of Anti Narcotics in Pakistan for short duration.
