= Bakht Jehan Khan =

Pakistani politician

Member of the Provincial Assembly of Khyber Pakhtunkhwa
- In office 2002–2007
- Constituency: PK-20 (Buner-I)

Speaker of the Provincial Assembly of Khyber Pakhtunkhwa
- In office 27 November 2002 – 9 October 2007
- Deputy: Ikramullah Shahid
- Preceded by: Hidayatullah Khan Chamkani
- Succeeded by: Kiramatullah Khan

Personal details
- Party: PMLN (2025-present)
- Other political affiliations: JIP (2002-2025)
- Occupation: Politician

Bakht Jehan Khan is a Pakistani politician from Buner District who served as Speaker of Provincial Assembly of Khyber Pakhtunkhwa from 2002 to 2007, belongs to Jamaat e Islami.

== Political career ==
Bakht Jehan Khan, MMA candidate for the post of Speaker bagged 81 votes, and Ikramullah Shahid from Mardan candidate for the office of Deputy Speaker, secured equal number of votes, 81 in 27 Nov 2002. Mr Jehan, who turned from Buner, belongs to the Jamaat-i-Islami and Mr Shahid is affiliated with the Jamiat Ulema-i-Islam, both main components of the six-party religious alliance. Then he become speaker of provincial assembly.

== See also ==
- Buner
- Torwarsak
