= NA-122 (Lahore-V) =

Constituency of the National Assembly of Pakistan

Constituency NA-122 (Lahore-V)
- Former constituency for the National Assembly of Pakistan
- Region: Lahore District

Former constituency
- Created: 2002
- Abolished: 2018

Constituency NA-122 (Lahore-V) (Urdu: این اے-۱۲۲، لاهور-۵) was a constituency for the National Assembly of Pakistan. It was abolished after the 2018 delimitations and its areas were dispersed in the surrounding constituencies with the majority going to NA-130 (Lahore-VIII).

== Boundaries ==
Prior to its abolishment, the Constituency includes the areas of Samanabad, Ichra, Shadman, Shah Jamal, Garhi Shahu, Dharam Pura and Upper Mall. The total number of voters in this constituency was close to 357,000.

== Election 2002 ==
General elections were held on 10 October 2002. Sardar Ayaz Sadiq of the Pakistan Muslim League (N) won by 37,531 votes.

General election 2002: NA-122 Lahore-V
| Party | Candidate | Votes | % | ±% |
|---|---|---|---|---|
| PML(N) | Sardar Ayaz Sadiq | 37,531 | 40.79 | |
| PTI | Imran Khan | 18,638 | 20.26 | |
| PPP | Ch. Ghulam Qadir | 17,561 | 19.09 | |
| PML(Q) | Muhammad Amin Ch. | 12,605 | 13.70 | |
| Independent | Ch. Muhammad Ali | 3,314 | 3.60 | |
| Others | Others (six candidates) | 2,360 | 2.56 | |
| Turnout | | 93,257 | 33.40 | |
| Total valid votes | | 92,009 | 98.66 | |
| Rejected ballots | | 1,248 | 1.34 | |
| Majority | | 18,893 | 20.53 | |
| Registered electors | | 279,245 | | |

== Election 2008 ==
General elections were held on 18 February 2008. Sardar Ayaz Sadiq of the Pakistan Muslim League (N) won by 79,507 votes.

General election 2008: NA-122 Lahore-V
| Party | Candidate | Votes | % | ±% |
|---|---|---|---|---|
| PML(N) | Sardar Ayaz Sadiq | 79,506 | 68.33 | |
| PPP | Mian Omer Misbah-Ul-Rehman | 24,963 | 21.45 | |
| PML(Q) | Mian Muhammad Jehangir | 10,657 | 9.16 | |
| Others | Others (seven candidates) | 1,233 | 1.06 | |
| Turnout | | 118,012 | 35.61 | |
| Total valid votes | | 116,359 | 98.60 | |
| Rejected ballots | | 1,653 | 1.40 | |
| Majority | | 54,543 | 46.88 | |
| Registered electors | | 331,381 | | |

== Election 2013 ==
General elections were held on 11 May 2013. Sardar Ayaz Sadiq of the Pakistan Muslim League (N) won by 93,389 votes and became the member of the National Assembly, but many irregularities in the election results surfaced after Pakistan Tehreek-e-Insaf (PTI) chairman Imran Khan demanded recounts and verification with the actual results. On 22 August 2015, an election tribunal annulled Ayaz Sadiq's victory in the 2013 general elections was rigged and ordered re-polling in the constituency. A by-election was held on 11 October 2015.

Detailed results for Constituency NA-122:

General election 2013: NA-122 Lahore-V
| Party | Candidate | Votes | % | ±% |
|---|---|---|---|---|
| PML(N) | Sardar Ayaz Sadiq | 93,389 | 51.28 | |
| PTI | Imran Khan | 84,517 | 46.41 | |
| PPP | Mian Amir Hassan Sharif | 2,833 | 1.56 | |
| Others | Others (seventeen candidates) | 1,365 | 0.75 | |
| Turnout | | 184,279 | 56.52 | |
| Total valid votes | | 182,104 | 98.82 | |
| Rejected ballots | | 2,175 | 1.18 | |
| Majority | | 8,872 | 4.87 | |
| Registered electors | | 326,028 | | |

== By-Election 2015 ==
After the order of election tribunal, a by-election was held on 11 October 2015. After a neck-to-neck competition between Sardar Ayaz Sadiq (PML(N)) and Aleem Khan (PTI), Sadiq won the election with 74,525 votes.

By-Election 2015: NA-122 Lahore-V
| Party | Candidate | Votes | % | ±% |
|---|---|---|---|---|
| PML(N) | Sardar Ayaz Sadiq | 74,525 | 50.35 | |
| PTI | Abdul Aleem Khan | 72,082 | 48.70 | |
| PPP | Barister Mian Amir Hussain | 819 | 0.55 | |
| Others | Others (thirteen candidates) | 601 | 0.40 | |
| Turnout | | 149,885 | 43.10 | |
| Total valid votes | | 148,027 | 98.76 | |
| Rejected ballots | | 1,858 | 1.24 | |
| Majority | | 2,443 | 1.65 | |
| Registered electors | | 347,762 | | |
