= Fazli Ghafoor =

Pakistani politician (born 1979)

Mufti Fazli Ghafoor
- مفتی فضل غفور

Member of the Provincial Assembly of Khyber Pakhtunkhwa
- In office 31 May 2013 – 2018
- Constituency: PK-79(Buner-III) Now PK-20(Buner-I)
- Prime Minister: Nawaz Sharif

Personal details
- Born: 13 April 1979 (age 47) Torwarsak, Pakistan
- Party: Jamiat Ulema-e-Islam (F)
- Education: B.A., M.A. Political science, Mufti course
- Occupation: Politician

Fazli Ghafoor (Urdu: فضل غفور; born 13 April 1979) is a Pakistani politician hailing from Torwarsak, Daggar, Buner. who was a member of the Khyber Pakhtunkhwa Assembly from 2013 to 2018. Ghafoor belong to the Jamiat Ulema-e-Islam (F). He also served as chairman and member of the different committees

== Early life and education ==
Mufti Fazli ghafoor hold BA degree and also did MA in political science. He also did his religious education and hold sanad of Mufti course.

== Personal life ==
Fazli Ghafoor belong to a religious Pashtun family in Torwarsak Buner. He is the son of great Islamic scholar of Buner Sheikh-ul-Hadees Hazrat Maulana Abdul Wadud دامت برکاتہم

== Other names ==
- Sher e Buner
- Mawlawi Sb مولوی صاحب
- Amir e Muhtaram

== Political career ==
Mufti Fazli Ghafoor was elected as the member of the Khyber Pakhtunkhwa Assembly on ticket of Jamiat Ulema-e-Islam (F) from PK-79 (Buner-III) Now PK-20 (Buner-I) in the 2013 Pakistani general election.

== Notable works ==
Torwarsak bridge is one of his biggest project for Buner, especially for Torwarsak.

== See more ==
- List of Deobandis
