= Ayaz Sadiq =

Pakistani politician (born 1954)

Sardar Ayaz Sadiq
- ایاز صادق
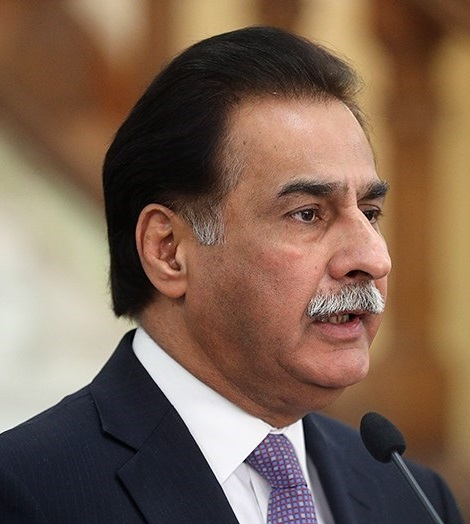
- Sadiq in 2017

17th and 20th Speaker of the National Assembly of Pakistan
- Incumbent
- Assumed office 1 March 2024
- Deputy: Ghulam Mustafa Shah
- Preceded by: Raja Pervaiz Ashraf
- In office 9 November 2015 – 15 August 2018
- Deputy: Murtaza Javed Abbasi
- Preceded by: Murtaza Javed Abbasi (acting)
- Succeeded by: Asad Qaiser
- In office 3 June 2013 – 22 August 2015
- Deputy: Murtaza Javed Abbasi
- Preceded by: Fahmida Mirza
- Succeeded by: Murtaza Javed Abbasi

Federal Minister For Economic Affairs
- In office 26 April 2022 – 10 August 2023
- President: Arif Alvi
- Prime Minister: Shehbaz Sharif
- Preceded by: Omar Ayub

Federal Minister for Political Affairs
- In office 16 May 2022 – 10 August 2023
- President: Arif Alvi
- Prime Minister: Shehbaz Sharif
- Preceded by: Position Created

Federal Minister For Law and Justice
- In office 31 October 2022 – 30 November 2022
- President: Arif Alvi
- Prime Minister: Shehbaz Sharif
- Preceded by: Azam Nazeer Tarar
- Succeeded by: Azam Nazeer Tarar

Member of the National Assembly of Pakistan
- Incumbent
- Assumed office 29 February 2024
- Constituency: NA-120 (Lahore-IV)
- Majority: 18,921 (%12.2)
- In office 13 August 2018 – 10 August 2023
- Constituency: NA-129 (Lahore-VII)
- Majority: 8,142 (%34.55)
- In office 18 November 2003 – 31 May 2018
- Constituency: NA-122 (Lahore-V)
- Majority: 18,893 (%45.89)

Personal details
- Born: 17 October 1954 (age 72) Lahore, West Punjab, Dominion of Pakistan
- Party: PMLN (2001–present)
- Other political affiliations: PTI (1997-2001)
- Spouse: Reema Ayaz (m. 1977)
- Children: 3
- Education: Aitchison College
- Alma mater: Hailey College of Commerce

Sardar Ayaz Sadiq (Note: Punjabi, Urdu: سردار اياز صادق) (born 17 October 1954) is a Pakistani politician and businessman serving as the Speaker of the National Assembly of Pakistan, the lower house of the federal parliament, since March 2024. He is one of the senior members of the Pakistan Muslim League (N) on the politics of Pakistan.

Born in Lahore, Sadiq previously served as the 17th Speaker of the National Assembly from 2013 to 2018. Sadiq is also notable for overseeing voting on the motion of no-confidence against Imran Khan in April 2022; the next day, he oversaw voting for the election of the subsequent Prime Minister, Shehbaz Sharif. He is currently a member of the National Assembly of Pakistan from NA-120 (Lahore-IV), having been elected to the Assembly in every election since 2002.

== Early life and education ==
Sadiq was born on 17 October 1954 into a Kashmiri Shaikh family in Lahore to businessman Sheikh Muhammad Sadiq and Attiya Sadiq, a social worker and philanthropist. His father and his grandfather Sheikh Sardar Muhammad have both been influential local figures. His grandfather had served as the Deputy Mayor of Lahore and was a political activist close to Fatima Jinnah.

He completed his education at Aitchison College, Lahore. Imran Khan, Nisar Ali Khan, Pervaiz Khattak, Sardar Akhtar Mengal and Zulfiqar Ali Magsi were among his class fellows at Aitchison College. After completing his Senior Cambridge, Sadiq received a degree in commerce from Hailey College of Punjab University in 1975. Sadiq represented his college in cricket and hockey and also held the title of Lahore’s junior table tennis champion.

== Political career ==
=== Pakistan Tehreek-e-Insaf ===
Sadiq began his political career as a member of the Pakistan Tehreek-e-Insaf (PTI) in the mid-1990s when he was a close friend of PTI chairman Imran Khan. Sadiq ran for the seat of Provincial Assembly of the Punjab as a candidate of PTI in the 1997 Pakistani general election from Constituency PP-121 Lahore but was unsuccessful. He received 4,541 votes and lost the seat to Pakistan Muslim League (N) (PML-N).

=== Pakistan Muslim League (N) ===
Sadiq left PTI in 1998 owing to differences with Imran Khan and joined PML (N) in 2001.

Sadiq was elected to the National Assembly of Pakistan as a candidate of PML-N from Constituency NA-122 (Lahore-V) on the 2002 general election, by defeating Imran Khan. Sadiq claimed "it was a big victory as his leader Nawaz Sharif in exile and Pervez Musharraf, a close aide of Imran Khan at that time, in power". During his tenure as the member of the National Assembly, he remained a member of the National Assembly's Standing Committees on Railways, Finance and Defence Production.

Sadiq was re-elected to the National Assembly as a candidate of PML-N from Constituency NA-122 (Lahore-V) in the 2008 general election. During his tenure as the member of the National Assembly, he became the chairman of the National Assembly's Standing Committees on Railways.

Sadiq was re-elected to the National Assembly as a candidate of PML-N from Constituency NA-122 (Lahore-V) in the 2013 Pakistani general election, by defeating Imran Khan. In June 2013, Sadiq was elected as the Speaker of the National Assembly of Pakistan.

In 2015, Imran Khan alleged rigging in the constituency of Sadiq from where Sadiq won in 2013 election. Following which the Election Commission of Pakistan de-seated Sadiq and ordered re-polling in the constituency. In October 2015, Sadiq retained his National Assembly seat by defeating a PTI candidate in by-election and was re-elected to the National Assembly for the fourth time. In November 2015, Sadiq retained its position as the speaker of the National Assembly by getting re-elected for the second time and become the first person to have been elected as the Speaker of the National Assembly for the second time during the same government's tenure in Pakistan.

He was re-elected to the National Assembly as a candidate of PML-N from Constituency NA-129 (Lahore-VII) in the 2018 Pakistani general election. On 15 August 2018, he was replaced by Asad Qaiser as speaker of the National Assembly.

He is generally considered a soft-spoken and cool-headed politician in Pakistan.

In 2020, he made claims relating to the 2019 India–Pakistan border skirmishes, in particular that foreign minister Qureshi was "trembling with fear" and insisted on releasing a pilot captured during the conflict, to avert an Indian invasion. This issue initiated a row, drawing sharp criticism from ISPR and the Pakistani government, terming his statements as "irresponsible" and demanding an apology. He addressed the controversy and added that his statement was misrepresented. Sadiq added that "Abhinandan had not come to Pakistan to distribute sweets; he had attacked Pakistan and it was a victory for Pakistan when his plane was shot down".

Amid the April 2022 political crisis in Pakistan, when the speaker and the deputy speaker resigned, he was asked to hold voting on a no-confidence motion against the prime minister of Pakistan.

== Personal life ==
=== Family ===
Sadiq married Reema Ayaz in 1977, and has a daughter and two sons. Reema is the daughter of former Chief Justice of Lahore High Court and the First Ombudsman of Pakistan Sardar Muhammad Iqbal.

=== Business ===
Sadiq is a businessman by profession. Among his declared business interests is Sardar Chemical Industries Limited, a publicly listed company engaged in the manufacture of dyes and chemical products for the textile and leather industries. Established as a private company in 1989, the firm commenced production in 1993 and was converted into a public limited company upon its listing on the Pakistan Stock Exchange in 1994. The company produces acid, direct, and reactive dyes, as well as optical brighteners, supplying primarily the domestic textile sector while also exporting a limited portion of its output, mainly to Bangladesh.

=== Philanthropy ===
He along with members of his family runs a non-profit hospital Sardar Trust Eye Hospital, established in Lahore in 1994. Previously, his grandfather had founded the Sheikh Sardar Muhammad Girls High School in Lahore after partition encouraging women education; the school was later nationalised. It was the first Muslim Girls School established in the locality.

== Notes ==
Political offices
Preceded by Fahmida Mirza	Speaker of the National Assembly; 2013 – 2018	Succeeded by Asad Qaiser
