= Tehreek-e-Tahaffuz-e-Pakistan =

Tehreek-e-Tahaffuz-e-Pakistan تحریک تحفظ پاکستان
- Leader: Abdul Qadeer Khan
- Founder: Abdul Qadeer Khan
- Founded: 2012; 13 years ago Islamabad, Pakistan
- Dissolved: 2013; 12 years ago
- Headquarters: Islamabad, Pakistan
- Ideology: Pakistani nationalism Centrism
- Political position: Centre
- Slogan: تحفظ پاکستان (lit. 'Protection of Pakistan')

Election symbol
- Missile

Tehreek-e-Tahaffuz-e-Pakistan (TTP) (Urdu: تحریک تحفظ پاکستان; Movement for the Protection of Pakistan) was a political party in Pakistan founded and led by the nuclear scientist Abdul Qadeer Khan. The party was registered with the Election Commission of Pakistan and was headquartered in Islamabad. It participated in the Pakistani general elections of 2013. In September 2013, the party was dissolved by Abdul Qadeer Khan.

== Introduction ==
The Tehreek-e-Tahaffuz-e-Pakistan was formed to defend Pakistan's geographic boundaries and to develop strong socio-economic principles. Its aim was to lead the Pakistani nation towards Quaid-e-Azam's dream of an Islamic, democratic welfare state and to build a strong Pakistan for future generations. Abdul Qadeer Khan took up this challenge and this Tahreek aimed to follow his guidelines and aspirations to achieve its objectives.

== History ==
When the Pakistani nation was demoralized after the separation of East Pakistan in 1971, Khan, a nuclear scientist and patriotic Pakistani came forward and started working on a nuclear programme. Pakistan officially became a nuclear Power in 1998. All the aggression against Pakistan came to halt with this, and national moral peaked. Unfortunately successive governments did not harvest the socio-economic benefits that the situation offered.

== Aims and objectives ==
To safeguard the sovereignty and integrity of Pakistan. To implement the Constitution of Pakistan in letter and Spirit including its objective clause. To combat corruption and exploitation at all levels, and by all means. To provide healthcare facilities to all citizens of Pakistan. To provide education to every Pakistani from primary to higher level, under one system of education. To provide compulsory education up to Higher Secondary School (Inter)level. To preserve the water resources through lining of the Indus river. To develop private/public partnerships for the socio-economic development of the country. To combat the energy crisis by all possible means. To provide shelter (Housing) for all Pakistanis. To provide full security to everyone including security of dignity & honor, security of life and Security of investment, trade & industry. To provide freedom of speech at all levels. To provide justice to the people of Pakistan at their doorstep. To develop political cadre in the youth of the country for future leadership. To promote information and communication technology as a tool of development. To safeguard the ideology and culture of Pakistan. To retire the external and internal debts of the country. To save the Ordinary citizens from exploitation by government functionaries like, Patwari, Police and Tax Authorities. To provide employment to the youth through government and private sectors. To create a friendly environment for the business community. To provide a merit based culture in all sectors of society. To create a specialization system for the correct placement of technocrats.

== Inspiration ==
THE PROPHET’S (saw) LAST SERMON This Sermon was delivered on the Ninth Day of Dhul Hijjah 10 A.H in the Uranah Valley of Mount Arafat:

"O People, lend me an attentive ear, for I don’t know whether, after this year, I shall ever be amongst you again. Therefore listen to what I am saying to you carefully and take these words to those who could not be present here today.

O People, just as you regard this month, this day, this city as Sacred, so regard the life and property of every Muslim as a sacred trust. Return the goods entrusted to you to their rightful owners. Hurt no one so that no one may hurt you. Remember that you will indeed meet your Lord, and that He will indeed reckon your deeds. Allah has forbidden you to take usury (interest), therefore all interest obligation shall henceforth be waived.

== Electoral history ==
National Assembly
| Election | Votes | % | Seats | +/– |
|---|---|---|---|---|
| 2013 | 76,358 | 0.17% | 1 / 342 | Steady |
