= Qaumi Watan Party =

Qaumi Watan Party قومی وطن پارٹی
- Pashto name: قومي وطن ګوند
- Abbreviation: QWP
- Leader: Aftab Ahmad Khan Sherpao
- Chairman: Aftab Ahmad Khan Sherpao
- General Secretary: Ahmed Nawaz Khan Jadoon
- Founded: October 17, 2012; 13 years ago
- Split from: PPP
- Preceded by: Pakistan Peoples Party–Sherpao
- Headquarters: Hayatabad, Khyber Pakhtunkhwa, Pakistan
- Ideology: Pashtun neo-nationalism Social democracy
- Political position: Centre-left
- Religion: Islam
- National affiliation: PDM; TTAP
- Colors: Red, black, white
- Senate of Pakistan: 0 / 104
- National Assembly of Pakistan: 0 / 366
- Provincial Assembly of Khyber Pakhtunkhwa: 0 / 145

Election symbol
- Chiragh (Oil Lamp)

Party flag

Website
- http://www.qwp.org.pk

Qaumi Watan Party (Urdu: قومی وطن پارٹی), commonly abbreviated as QWP, is a centre-left, progressive political party in Pakistan that advocates for Pashtun nationalism, social democracy, and provincial autonomy within a federal constitutional framework. The party has its political roots in the Pakistan Peoples Party–Sherpao faction formed in 1999, and was rebranded as Qaumi Watan Party in 2012 by its founder and current chairman, Aftab Ahmad Khan Sherpao — a veteran politician and twice-elected Chief Minister of Khyber Pakhtunkhwa.

The party's ideological base lies in representing the socio-political and economic aspirations of the people of Khyber Pakhtunkhwa, especially the Pashtun population in the Malakand region, the merged tribal districts (formerly FATA), and parts of northern Balochistan. QWP promotes a peaceful, inclusive, and democratic Pakistan by calling for full implementation of the 18th Amendment to the Constitution of Pakistan, provincial ownership of resources, increased public spending on health and education, and an end to militancy through political dialogue and developmental justice.

Qaumi Watan Party has participated in multiple provincial governments, most notably as a coalition partner with the Pakistan Tehreek-e-Insaf in Khyber Pakhtunkhwa from 2013 to 2014 and again from 2015 to 2018. In 2020, the party joined the opposition alliance known as the Pakistan Democratic Movement (PDM), where Aftab Sherpao holds a senior vice-presidential role. Although it did not win any seats in the 2018 general elections, QWP continues to play an active role in provincial and national discourse, particularly on issues of constitutional federalism, minority rights, and regional peace.

== History ==
=== 1999–2008: Formation as PPP–Sherpao and Early Development ===
The political roots of Qaumi Watan Party (QWP) trace back to 1999, when Aftab Ahmad Khan Sherpao, a senior leader of the Pakistan Peoples Party (PPP) and a two-time Chief Minister of the then North-West Frontier Province (now Khyber Pakhtunkhwa), parted ways with PPP following internal disagreements with the party’s central leadership under Benazir Bhutto. In response to mounting ideological and strategic differences, Sherpao launched his own faction under the banner of Pakistan Peoples Party (Sherpao) or PPP–S.

PPP–S contested the 2002 general elections and secured representation both at the national and provincial levels. In Khyber Pakhtunkhwa, the party emerged as a regional political force, winning several provincial assembly seats, mostly from Charsadda District, Swat District, Mardan District, and surrounding Pashtun-majority areas. In the 2008 elections, PPP–S retained its influence in KP, further solidifying Sherpao’s political base in the region.

=== 2012: Renaming and Rebranding to Qaumi Watan Party ===
On 17 October 2012, Aftab Sherpao officially renamed PPP–S as the Qaumi Watan Party, reflecting a strategic shift away from traditional Bhutto-era socialist politics toward a more indigenous, nationalist, and federalist outlook. The rebranding was meant to emphasize the party’s commitment to the rights of marginalized provinces, especially KP and the then-Federally Administered Tribal Areas (FATA).

The newly adopted party flag — a tricolor of red, black, green, and white — was intended to represent revolution, resistance, peace, and unity, respectively. The change was also symbolic of the party's repositioning as a pro-Pashtun, pro-federation force that advocates for civilian supremacy, inclusive governance, and equitable resource distribution.

=== 2013–2018: Alliance with PTI, Ehtesab Commission Conflict, and Reconciliation ===
In the 2013 general elections, QWP won 10 seats in the Khyber Pakhtunkhwa Assembly and entered into a coalition government with the Pakistan Tehreek-e-Insaf (PTI), which had emerged as the single largest party in KP. Sikandar Hayat Khan Sherpao, the son of Aftab Sherpao, was appointed as Senior Minister for Home and Tribal Affairs.

However, in November 2013, the coalition between QWP and PTI was discontinued after administrative differences arose, particularly over transparency mechanisms and mutual coordination. While media reports at the time speculated about corruption allegations, no formal charges or judicial proceedings were ever initiated against QWP ministers. In 2015, PTI and QWP reconciled, and the latter rejoined the provincial cabinet, resuming its ministerial responsibilities. During this tenure, QWP was involved in various infrastructure and rural development initiatives, including advocacy for the Swat Expressway.

=== 2018–2024: Electoral Setback, Strategic Shift, and PDM Alliance ===
The 2018 general elections marked a period of decline for QWP, as it failed to win any seats in both the National Assembly and Khyber Pakhtunkhwa Assembly. The party attributed this setback to rising populism, the weakening of smaller regional parties, and an uneven electoral playing field.

In 2020, QWP joined the Pakistan Democratic Movement (PDM), a grand opposition alliance formed to resist alleged interference by the establishment in civilian governance and elections. Aftab Sherpao was appointed as Senior Vice President of PDM, and the party became increasingly vocal on issues such as enforced disappearances in the tribal areas, the rights of Afghan refugees, and the implementation of the 18th Amendment.

Despite lacking legislative representation, QWP remained active in political and legal forums, issuing policy papers, participating in public rallies, and maintaining a presence in KP’s district-level politics.

== Ideology and Political Platform ==
Qaumi Watan Party (QWP) defines itself as a centre-left, progressive, and nationalist party committed to promoting Pashtun nationalism, constitutional federalism, and social justice in Pakistan. While its ideological roots lie in its earlier association with the Pakistan Peoples Party, QWP has evolved into a distinct voice for the socioeconomic rights of smaller provinces, particularly Khyber Pakhtunkhwa (KP) and the formerly merged tribal areas (ex-FATA).

=== Federalism and Provincial Autonomy ===
QWP is a staunch advocate of true federalism. The party strongly supports the full implementation of the 18th Amendment to the Constitution of Pakistan, which devolves powers from the central government to the provinces. The party advocates for:

- Enforcement of Articles 158 and 161 of the Constitution, ensuring provinces retain control over their natural resources such as gas, oil, and hydropower
- A fair and transparent National Finance Commission (NFC) Award to address inter-provincial economic disparities
- Special development packages for historically neglected regions, including merged districts, southern KP, and northern Balochistan

=== Pashtun Nationalism and Regional Rights ===
Central to QWP’s ideology is the recognition and empowerment of Pashtun identity within the Pakistani federation. The party advocates for:

- Respect for linguistic and cultural diversity, including Pashto language promotion in education and state media
- Peace and reconciliation in tribal areas through political inclusion and economic investment, rather than militarized solutions
- Equal representation of Pashtuns in national decision-making bodies, including the civil service and security institutions

=== Social Democracy and Welfare State ===
QWP envisions a social democratic model for Pakistan with inclusive policies in education, health, and employment:

- Education: Increase education budget to 5% of GDP, build new schools in remote regions, and reintroduce student unions
- Healthcare: Universal access to Basic Health Units (BHUs), mobile clinics, and recruitment of female health workers
- Youth Empowerment: Vocational training, IT skills programs, and interest-free loans to fight unemployment
- Women’s Participation: Greater female representation in politics, legal protection for women’s rights, and access to skill development

=== Governance and Institutional Reform ===
QWP has consistently supported institutional reform and democratic strengthening, including:

- Strengthening the judiciary and independent accountability commissions free from political manipulation
- Electoral reforms for an empowered and autonomous Election Commission of Pakistan
- Revival of local governments with financial and legislative autonomy
- Civilian supremacy in national security, foreign policy, and economic decision-making

=== Peace and Counter-Terrorism ===
Unlike parties that support military-led conflict resolution, QWP calls for a political approach to peace in KP and tribal regions:

- Dialogue with alienated groups under the Constitution
- An end to enforced disappearances, collective punishment, and extrajudicial practices
- Strengthening of community-based law enforcement, including Levies and Khasadar forces

=== Foreign Policy and Regional Diplomacy ===
QWP promotes a balanced, people-centric foreign policy focused on regional cooperation and trade:

- Enhanced cultural and economic ties with Afghanistan through cross-border trade, infrastructure, and diplomacy
- Greater provincial stakes in China–Pakistan Economic Corridor (CPEC) planning and execution
- Support for the rights of Kashmiris and Palestinians
- Engagement with regional neighbors including Iran, India, Central Asia, and Gulf countries

== Organizational Structure ==
Qaumi Watan Party (QWP) is structured as a disciplined, centralized political organization with participatory elements and grassroots outreach across Khyber Pakhtunkhwa and adjacent Pashtun-majority areas. The party emphasizes internal democracy, regional representation, and youth involvement, while its leadership is centered around seasoned politicians with decades of administrative and parliamentary experience.

=== National Council ===
The National Council is the party’s highest decision-making body. It sets the strategic direction of QWP, approves policy frameworks, oversees manifesto development, and ratifies constitutional amendments within the party. It includes:

- Founding and senior leaders
- Elected provincial and district presidents
- Women, youth, and professional representatives
- Members from overseas chapters (if active)

The National Council convenes at least once a year or during extraordinary political circumstances, such as pre-election strategy or post-election alignment.

=== Central Executive Committee (CEC) ===
The Central Executive Committee (CEC) functions as the core administrative authority of the party. It is responsible for:

- Organizational planning and internal coordination
- Management of election campaigns and party logistics
- Media strategy and narrative framing
- Liaison with provincial, district, and tehsil-level bodies

CEC decisions are binding across all tiers of the party unless formally revised by the National Council.

=== Provincial and District Coordination Committees ===
QWP maintains a robust presence through its provincial, district, tehsil, and union-level coordination offices. These local bodies handle:

- Public rallies, voter outreach, and awareness campaigns
- Internal elections and enforcement of party discipline
- Community-level seminars on policy and representation
- Coordination with elected officials and local government bodies

Most district and tehsil presidents are elected via internal party mechanisms or selected through consensus in remote areas.

=== Youth Wing (Qaumi Watan Party Youth Forum) ===
The Youth Wing plays an essential role in QWP’s outreach and capacity-building strategies. It works to:

- Mobilize youth through campus-based activism and training
- Conduct digital awareness campaigns on democracy, identity, and rights
- Organize IT boot camps and soft-skill development sessions, notably in Swat District and Charsadda District
- Represent youth interests in provincial and national forums

Youth Wing members have actively participated in national student conferences and peace-building workshops.

=== Women’s Wing ===
The QWP Women’s Wing promotes gender equity and increases female participation in politics and development. It organizes:

- Women-only rallies, legal awareness campaigns, and healthcare outreach
- Training on leadership, vocational skills, and policy engagement
- Political mentoring in union councils and district assemblies
- Representation in national women's forums and legislative dialogues

The Women's Wing has increased engagement in rural KP where women traditionally face barriers to political representation.

=== Legal, Professional, and Minority Forums ===
QWP has established several dedicated sub-wings for targeted engagement:

- Legal Affairs Forum: Legal advocacy, rights monitoring, and election petitioning
- Minorities Committee: Represents Christian, Hindu, and Sikh communities, especially in tribal districts
- Professionals Forum: Brings together educators, doctors, and engineers for policy feedback

These forums ensure broader participation from underrepresented groups in shaping party positions and manifestos.

=== Overseas Chapters ===
Though not fully institutionalized, QWP has informal representation and community contacts in the Gulf region, including Saudi Arabia, UAE, and Qatar, where a large population of Pashtun expatriate workers resides. The party has raised concerns about migrant labor rights and intends to strengthen diaspora networks in these countries.

== Leadership ==
Qaumi Watan Party (QWP) is led by veteran politician Aftab Ahmad Khan Sherpao, who has played a pivotal role in shaping the political identity of Khyber Pakhtunkhwa since the 1980s. The party’s leadership structure is centralized, with support from long-serving deputies, youth leaders, and professionals.

The leadership model combines dynastic continuity—through the emergence of Sikandar Hayat Khan Sherpao—with grassroots party-building across provincial and district tiers.

=== Party Founder and Chairman ===
Aftab Ahmad Khan Sherpao is the founder and current chairman of QWP. His political credentials include:

- Twice elected Chief Minister of Khyber Pakhtunkhwa (1988–90, 1994–96)
- Former Interior Minister of Pakistan (2004–2007)
- Multiple-time Member of the National Assembly from Charsadda District
- Long-time advocate for Pashtun nationalism, federalism, and democratic civilian governance

Sherpao's political legacy traces back to his martyred brother, Hayat Muhammad Khan Sherpao, a former Governor of North-West Frontier Province (NWFP) and co-founder of the Pakistan Peoples Party.

=== Senior Vice Chairman ===
Sikandar Hayat Khan Sherpao, son of Aftab Sherpao, is QWP’s Senior Vice Chairman. He has:

- Served as Senior Minister for Home and Tribal Affairs in KP
- Represented QWP in coalition talks with Pakistan Tehreek-e-Insaf and later in Pakistan Democratic Movement strategy sessions
- Advocated for youth development, police reform, and devolution

His rise reflects a transition to second-generation leadership within the party.

=== Secretary-General ===
Ahmed Nawaz Khan Jadoon currently serves as the Secretary-General of QWP. He oversees:

- Organizational strategy and internal coordination
- Election campaign management and media outreach
- Engagement with the Election Commission of Pakistan and legal forums

=== Central Executive Members ===
The Central Executive Committee (CEC) of QWP includes:

- Provincial party heads
- Presidents of Youth and Women Wings
- Policy advisors, legal counsel, and media coordinators
- District presidents from key constituencies such as Swat, Charsadda, Dir, and merged tribal districts

=== Leadership Table ===
Below is a summary of key leadership roles:

Position	Name	Term start	Notes
Founder & Chairman	Aftab Ahmad Khan Sherpao	1999	Founder of PPP–S; rebranded to QWP in 2012; ex-CM & Interior Minister
Senior Vice Chairman	Sikandar Hayat Khan Sherpao	2012	Ex-Senior Minister KP; son of Aftab Sherpao
Secretary-General	Ahmed Nawaz Khan Jadoon	2021	Oversees party coordination and campaign planning
Spokesperson	[Name Placeholder]	[Year]	Handles party communication and media strategy
Women Wing President	[Name Placeholder]	[Year]	Leads women's outreach and gender advocacy
Youth Wing President	[Name Placeholder]	[Year]	Coordinates youth training and activism

== Electoral Performance ==
Since its inception in 1999 as Pakistan Peoples Party (Sherpao) (PPP–S), and later as Qaumi Watan Party (QWP), the party has maintained a consistent regional electoral presence, primarily in Khyber Pakhtunkhwa (KP). While QWP has not emerged as a national-level party in terms of parliamentary strength, it has played an influential role in provincial coalition politics.

The party’s most successful electoral performance occurred during the 2013 Pakistani general election, where it secured 10 seats in the Khyber Pakhtunkhwa Assembly and joined the provincial government. In subsequent years, like many regional parties, QWP faced competition from rising populist movements, including Pakistan Tehreek-e-Insaf (PTI).

=== National Assembly Elections ===
QWP Performance in National Assembly Elections
Year	Contested Seats	Seats Won	Vote Share	Notes
2002	15	1	~1.2%	Contested as PPP–S
2008	18	1	~1.0%	Retained single seat in KP
2013	20	0	~0.8%	Focused on provincial strategy
2018	10	0	<1%	No seats won nationally
2024	TBA	TBA	TBA	Results pending

=== Khyber Pakhtunkhwa Provincial Assembly Elections ===
QWP Performance in Khyber Pakhtunkhwa Assembly Elections
Year	Contested Seats	Seats Won	Vote Share (Estimate)	Notes
2002	24	5	~4.5%	Marked entry into provincial politics
2008	26	6	~4.9%	Consolidated influence in KP
2013	30	10	~6.3%	Joined PTI-led coalition government
2018	15	0	<2%	Failed to win seats; lost to PTI wave
2024	TBA	TBA	TBA	Results awaited

=== Reserved and Minority Representation ===
QWP has not held any reserved seats for women or minorities in the National Assembly of Pakistan, but the party has promoted minority and gender representation through internal structures and provincial nominations. Its Women’s Wing and Minority Forum have been active in KP’s rural and tribal areas, including organizing legal rights seminars and nominating minority candidates in local elections.

=== Coalition Participation Summary ===
Summary of QWP’s Coalition Participation
Year	Coalition Partner	Role in Government	Outcome
2013	Pakistan Tehreek-e-Insaf	Joined KP coalition government	Exited in 2014 after political disagreements
2015	Pakistan Tehreek-e-Insaf	Rejoined coalition in KP	Continued until 2018
2020	Pakistan Democratic Movement	Joined opposition alliance	Aftab Ahmad Khan Sherpao named Senior Vice President

== Policy Proposals and Manifestos ==
Qaumi Watan Party (QWP) has consistently positioned itself as a reform-oriented, development-focused, and rights-based political force, particularly committed to the empowerment of marginalized regions like Khyber Pakhtunkhwa, the merged tribal districts (ex-FATA), and southern districts of Pakistan.

Its election manifestos—including those from 2013, 2018, and 2024—emphasize good governance, regional autonomy, education, healthcare, youth development, and anti-corruption within the constitutional framework of devolved federalism.

=== Vision Summary ===
At the heart of QWP's policy platform is the belief that true democracy, national unity, and economic justice are only possible by empowering provinces, investing in human capital, and protecting civilian supremacy.

=== 2013 Manifesto Highlights ===
The 2013 election manifesto focused on:

Governance and Accountability:

- Full implementation of the 18th Amendment to the Constitution of Pakistan
- Establishment of an independent provincial accountability commission
- Merit-based recruitment in public sector institutions

Peace and Stability:

- Political solutions to extremism and militancy
- Socioeconomic uplift of conflict-affected regions

Education and Health:

- Minimum 5% of GDP allocation for education
- Technical education and teacher training programs
- Community-based Basic Health Units and mobile health clinics

Tribal Reforms:

- Integration of FATA into KP (eventually achieved post-2018)
- Political representation of tribal populations in mainstream governance structures

=== 2018 Policy Continuity ===
Despite not winning seats in 2018, QWP continued to advocate key policy issues through its speeches and public position papers:

CPEC Transparency:

- Greater inclusion of KP in China–Pakistan Economic Corridor (CPEC) decisions
- Allocation of Special Economic Zones and transport routes for KP

Youth and Employment:

- Digital literacy drives in rural areas
- Establishment of vocational centers
- Reinstatement of student unions in universities

Minority and Women Rights:

- Representation of religious minorities in party policy forums
- Empowerment of women via local government reservations and skills training

=== 2024 Election Manifesto ===
The 2024 document, titled Muttafiqa Taraqqi Ka Rasta (A United Path to Progress), outlines a 20-point reform plan focusing on human development, institutional reform, and inclusive growth.

Education and Human Capital:

- Increase education funding to 5% of GDP
- Free and compulsory schooling until matric level
- Reintroduction of student unions
- STEM curriculum and digital education tools

Health and Social Protection:

- 24/7 operational BHUs in each union council
- Free maternal and child healthcare in rural zones
- Mobile health clinics and telemedicine for tribal districts

Economy and Employment:

- Interest-free loans for youth entrepreneurs
- IT hubs in Charsadda District, Swat District, and Dir District
- Agro-industrial zones in northern KP

Tribal Development and Federal Equity:

- Dedicated development fund for merged districts
- Civilian oversight of Levies and Khasadar forces
- Representation of merged areas in civil service and judiciary

Governance and Accountability:

- Revival of local governments with fiscal autonomy
- Institutional reform of NAB and Election Commission of Pakistan
- Implementation of right-to-information laws at the district level

Foreign and Regional Policy:

- Normalization of trade and mobility with Afghanistan and Iran
- Greater provincial role in CPEC-related policy
- Advocacy for peaceful solutions in Kashmir and Palestine

=== Vision 2025 and Beyond ===
QWP’s long-term policy direction includes:

- Strengthening federalism through provincial control of natural and fiscal resources
- Making KP a hub of education, eco-tourism, and cross-border commerce
- Ensuring civilian supremacy in democratic governance
- Pursuing a foreign policy centered on regional stability and cultural diplomacy

== Public Welfare and Development Projects ==
While Qaumi Watan Party (QWP) has historically operated as a regional political force in Khyber Pakhtunkhwa, it has actively supported public welfare initiatives during its tenure in coalition governments (2013–2018) and beyond. Its developmental priorities have focused on rural uplift, youth empowerment, education, healthcare, and local infrastructure.

=== Education and Skill Development ===
QWP has promoted inclusive access to education, especially for girls and underserved communities:

Free Midday Meal Program (2015–2017): Pilot programs in Swat District and Charsadda District provided midday meals to reduce dropouts and address childhood malnutrition. These were coordinated via local governments and supported by QWP lawmakers.

Digital and IT Skill Training for Youth: From 2016–2018, QWP’s Youth Wing collaborated with local IT professionals and NGOs to host digital literacy camps in Swat, Dir, and Charsadda. Focus areas included freelancing, basic coding, and online job skills for youth in post-conflict areas.

Student Union Advocacy: QWP has repeatedly advocated for the revival of student unions across KP colleges and universities, emphasizing political education and youth leadership.

=== Healthcare Initiatives ===
In response to healthcare disparities in KP and tribal areas, QWP promoted the following programs:

24/7 Basic Health Units (BHUs): QWP legislators proposed round-the-clock BHU staffing in Charsadda, Swabi, and Shangla, focusing on rural service access.

Mobile Health Clinics: The party supported mobile health vans in ex-FATA to address maternal care, vaccination, and diagnostics in remote communities.

COVID-19 Response Advocacy (2020–2021): Although not in government during the pandemic, QWP conducted vaccination awareness campaigns in tribal regions, countering vaccine hesitancy.

=== Infrastructure Development ===
QWP contributed to infrastructure upgrades, often through development funds allocated during coalition years:

Swat Expressway (Phase I): While initiated by PTI, QWP played a significant role in land acquisition and public outreach for this strategic tourism and trade corridor through Malakand.

Rural Roads & Electrification: QWP MPs advocated for PMU-led rural road development and partnered with WAPDA and KP Energy Department for electricity access in remote areas of Dir, Buner, and Charsadda.

=== Agriculture and Livelihoods ===
QWP supports agrarian communities in KP through:

Seed and Fertilizer Subsidies: The party pushed for fair pricing and timely access to agriculture inputs, especially for small farmers in Swabi and Mardan.

Cash Crop Pricing Advocacy: QWP consistently raised issues concerning tobacco and sugarcane pricing and advocated against exploitation by industrial buyers.

Agro-Industrial Zones: As per its 2024 manifesto, QWP proposes food processing zones for crops like maize, olives, and apricots in Swat and upper KP.

=== Urban-Rural Equality and Minority Inclusion ===
Safe Housing Advocacy: QWP supported formal housing rights for urban slum residents, Afghan refugees, and daily wage laborers in peri-urban KP.

Support for Minorities: Its dedicated Minorities Committee promotes interfaith dialogue, sanitation in Christian settlements, and scholarship access for non-Muslim students in KP.

=== Summary of Key Impact Zones ===
Key Welfare Impact Zones by Sector
Sector	Key Regions Affected	Initiative Type
Education	Swat, Charsadda, Dir	Digital training, midday meals
Health	Ex-FATA, Buner, Shangla	Mobile clinics, BHU reform
Infrastructure	Malakand, Charsadda	Expressway support, road upgrades
Agriculture	Swabi, Mardan, Dargai	Price advocacy, subsidy support
Minorities	Peshawar, Bannu	Sanitation, housing, scholarships

== Political Alliances ==
Qaumi Watan Party (QWP) has followed a pragmatic yet principled approach to political alliances, prioritizing federalism, provincial rights, and democratic continuity. The party has participated in both coalition governments and opposition movements, aligning with national or regional entities based on constitutional interests.

=== Alliance with Pakistan Tehreek-e-Insaf (2013–2014) ===
Following the 2013 Pakistani general election, QWP secured 10 seats in the Khyber Pakhtunkhwa Assembly and joined a coalition with Pakistan Tehreek-e-Insaf (PTI), which had emerged as the majority party.

QWP was allotted key ministerial roles, including Home and Tribal Affairs, with Sikandar Hayat Khan Sherpao serving as Senior Minister. However, in November 2013, PTI unilaterally dismissed QWP ministers citing administrative inefficiencies and alleged corruption.

No formal charges or judicial action followed. Analysts widely criticized the decision as politically motivated, damaging intra-coalition trust.

=== Reconciliation and Return to Coalition (2015–2018) ===
In April 2015, after negotiations, QWP rejoined the PTI-led provincial government:

- The renewed partnership focused on development-oriented governance and mutual party respect
- QWP supported the Swat Expressway project and reforms for tribal integration
- The alliance lasted until the end of the assembly’s term in May 2018

=== Entry into Pakistan Democratic Movement (2020–present) ===
In September 2020, QWP joined the Pakistan Democratic Movement (PDM), a multi-party opposition alliance formed to:

- Advocate for civilian supremacy and parliamentary democracy
- Demand free and fair elections
- Oppose military involvement in political decision-making

QWP Chairman Aftab Ahmad Khan Sherpao was appointed Senior Vice President of PDM. Since joining, QWP has:

- Participated in protests and jalsas in KP and Islamabad
- Issued policy briefs on electoral and constitutional reforms
- Advocated for Afghan refugees in Pakistan and internally displaced persons

=== Position on Other Alliances ===
QWP has historically maintained distance from long-term alliances with national parties like Pakistan Muslim League (N) and Pakistan Peoples Party, but has supported issue-based cooperation when aligned with party ideology.

For example, on subjects like the FATA merger, CPEC route distribution, and the 18th Amendment to the Constitution of Pakistan, QWP has coordinated with various opposition blocs while opposing actions that undermined constitutional federalism.

=== Summary of Political Partnerships ===
QWP Political Alliances Timeline
Period	Partner Party	Nature of Alliance	Outcome
2013–2014	Pakistan Tehreek-e-Insaf	KP coalition government	Ended over administrative fallout
2015–2018	Pakistan Tehreek-e-Insaf	Rejoined KP coalition	Continued until end of assembly term
2020–present	Pakistan Democratic Movement	National opposition alliance	Ongoing; QWP in PDM leadership

== Controversies and Criticism ==
While Qaumi Watan Party (QWP) has generally maintained a reputation as a moderate, democratic, and issue-based regional party, it has faced several controversies, primarily tied to its coalition politics and symbolic rebranding.

=== Alleged Corruption During Coalition with PTI (2013) ===
In November 2013, Pakistan Tehreek-e-Insaf (PTI) expelled QWP from the Khyber Pakhtunkhwa provincial coalition, alleging corruption within QWP-held ministries.

However, no formal investigations or judicial proceedings substantiated the claims, and the Khyber Pakhtunkhwa Ehtesab Commission did not file any charges. QWP denied all allegations, calling the dismissal politically motivated. In 2015, QWP rejoined the coalition, which observers interpreted as tacit recognition of the party's clean record.

Critics noted that QWP did not push for a formal exoneration. Party leadership responded that reconciliation and reinstatement were public acknowledgments of their non-involvement in wrongdoing.

=== Symbolism and Flag Resemblance Controversy ===
After renaming itself from PPP–Sherpao to Qaumi Watan Party in 2012, some commentators claimed that QWP’s tricolor flag (red, black, green, white) resembled the flag of Afghanistan under King Amanullah Khan in 1929.

QWP clarified that its flag’s color scheme represents:

- Red: Revolution
- Black: Resistance
- Green: Peace
- White: Unity

The flag is officially registered with the Election Commission of Pakistan (ECP), and no legal objections have been filed regarding its design. Party officials argue that similar color themes are used globally and that QWP’s symbolism is rooted in the socio-political identity of the Pashtun people.

=== Criticism for Regionalism and Limited National Reach ===
Some political analysts criticize QWP for lacking presence in Punjab, Sindh, and Balochistan, labeling it as a region-specific party.

QWP leadership counters this by highlighting:

- Its focus on underrepresented regions like KP and ex-FATA
- Its role in strengthening federalism through localized empowerment
- Its potential to expand after achieving developmental equity in its base regions

=== Media Visibility and Perception Challenges ===
QWP’s limited airtime on mainstream national media has also been a challenge. The dominance of national parties like PTI, Pakistan Muslim League (N), and Pakistan Peoples Party often sidelines QWP in media coverage.

To counter this, the party has increased:

- Engagement on social media platforms
- Participation in opposition alliances like Pakistan Democratic Movement
- District-level outreach and direct press briefings

=== Summary of Responses ===
Overview of QWP’s Responses to Key Criticisms
Issue	Criticism	QWP Response
PTI fallout (2013)	Allegations of corruption	Denied; later rejoined coalition without charges
Flag resemblance	Similarity to Afghan flag	Clarified symbolism; no legal objection filed
National footprint	Seen as regionally confined	Strategic focus on KP and tribal uplift
Media visibility	Underrepresented in mainstream media	Increased digital and coalition engagement

== Party Symbols ==
Qaumi Watan Party (QWP) employs political symbols that embody its ideology of resistance, reform, peace, and unity—especially within the context of Pashtun nationalism and constitutional federalism. Its visual and linguistic identity—through flag design, electoral symbol, and slogan—has become well known in Khyber Pakhtunkhwa and surrounding regions.

=== Party Flag ===
The official flag of QWP is a horizontal tricolour composed of red, black, and white, with green also featured in certain graphic designs. The flag was formally adopted in October 2012 after the party transitioned from Pakistan Peoples Party–Sherpao (PPP–S) to Qaumi Watan Party.

Symbolism of Colors:

- Red: Revolution, sacrifice, and resistance against tyranny
- Black: Struggle, resilience, and remembrance of martyrs
- White: Peace, unity, and social harmony
- Green (optional): National solidarity and Islamic identity

Although the flag has been informally compared to historical Afghan banners, QWP clarifies that its symbolism is ideological and rooted in indigenous resistance narratives rather than regional affiliations. The flag is officially registered with the Election Commission of Pakistan.

=== Election Symbol ===
QWP’s registered election symbol with the Election Commission of Pakistan is a table (میز). It appears on ballots, posters, and campaign material.

The symbol of the table represents:

- Dialogue and deliberation
- Democratic decision-making
- Community gathering and consultation

The party chose the table due to its recognizability in rural areas and its alignment with QWP’s values of inclusive governance.

=== Party Slogan ===
The official party slogan is:

“امن، ترقی، اور خوشحالی — ہمارا وعدہ” “Peace, Progress, and Prosperity — Our Pledge”

This slogan reflects QWP’s central goals of conflict resolution, social development, and economic justice. It is prominently used in speeches, banners, and party literature.

=== Party Colors ===
The core colors associated with QWP—red, black, white, and green—are used consistently across:

- Rally flags and political marches
- Website and social media graphics
- Printed literature and official merchandise
- Membership cards and internal documents

These colors visually distinguish QWP from other national parties and reflect its regional-cultural identity.

=== Headquarters and Branding ===
QWP’s central headquarters is located in Hayatabad, Peshawar, where most of the party’s strategic planning, press briefings, and administrative coordination occurs.

The official website is qwppk.vercel.app, which features manifesto documents, leadership messages, and organizational updates.

== See also ==
=== Individuals ===
- Aftab Ahmad Khan Sherpao – Founder and current Chairman of Qaumi Watan Party; former Interior Minister and Chief Minister of Khyber Pakhtunkhwa
- Sikandar Hayat Khan Sherpao – Senior Vice Chairman of QWP; former Senior Minister for Home and Tribal Affairs
- Hayat Muhammad Khan Sherpao – Martyred brother of Aftab Sherpao; former Governor of NWFP and founding PPP member

=== Ideological & Political Context ===
- Pashtun nationalism – Ethnopolitical movement central to QWP’s platform
- Federalism in Pakistan – Core constitutional principle advocated by QWP
- 18th Amendment to the Constitution of Pakistan – Legal foundation for provincial autonomy
- Pakistan Democratic Movement – Opposition alliance joined by QWP in 2020

=== Related Political Parties ===
- Pakistan Peoples Party – Parent party from which QWP split in 1999
- Pakistan Tehreek-e-Insaf – Former coalition partner in KP government
- Awami National Party – Pashtun nationalist party with overlapping voter base

=== Regional Focus ===
- Khyber Pakhtunkhwa – QWP’s home province and political stronghold
- Merged Tribal Districts – Region prioritized in QWP’s development agenda
- Swat Expressway – Infrastructure project supported during QWP’s coalition tenure
