= Federalism in Pakistan =

Pakistan is a federal parliamentary republic, with powers shared between the Federal government and the provinces. Relations between federation and provinces are defined in Part V (Articles 141–159) of the constitution. Many Pakistani parties support a federalist and regionalist agenda advocating for increased powers to be held by the provinces. The Ministry of Inter Provincial Coordination manages federal relations between provinces while the Senate of Pakistan is an important body giving representation to the provinces of Pakistan in national governance.

== Legislative powers ==
The power of the provinces and the Federal government were defined by the constitution and the legislative powers are divided into two lists. The Concurrent List was abolished after the 18th amendment, and most powers were transferred to provinces.

== Council of Common Interests ==
Council of Common Interests or CCI was established as a body to solve disputes between the federation and the provinces. The membership of CCI consisted of the Prime Minister, Provincial Chief Ministers and three members nominated by federal government.

== The 18th Amendment ==
The federal framework of Pakistan was significantly reformed by the 18th Amendment. The amendment adjusted the formula for sharing finance between the provinces. The amendment was followed by significant devolution of administrative responsibility to the provinces.

== Advocacy for further reform ==
A number of political movements support expansion of the federation, to give provincial status to Gilgit-Baltistan for example, or to create new units out of existing provinces.

== See also ==
- Constitution of Pakistan
- Federal Government of Pakistan
- List of countries by federal system
