= Federal republic =

Federation of states or territories with a republican form of government

A federal republic is a federation of states with a republic as a form of government. At its core, the literal meaning of the word republic when used to reference a form of government means a country that is governed by elected representatives and by an elected leader according to the principles of federal republicanism, such as a president, rather than by a monarch or any hereditary aristocracy.

In a federal republic, a division of powers exists between the federal government and the governments of the individual subdivisions. While each federal republic manages this division of powers differently, common matters relating to international affairs and treaties, security and defense, inter-state relations, and monetary policy are usually handled at the federal level, while matters such as infrastructure maintenance and education policy are usually handled at the regional or local level; however, views differ on what issues should be a federal competence, and subdivisions usually have sovereignty in some matters where the federal government does not have jurisdiction. A federal republic is thus best defined in contrast to a unitary republic, whereby the central government has complete sovereignty over all aspects of political life. This more decentralized structure helps to explain the tendency for more populous countries to operate as federal republics.

Most federal republics codify the division of powers between orders of government in a written constitutional document. The political differences between a federal republic and other federal states, especially federal monarchies under a parliamentary system of government, are largely a matter of legal form rather than political substance, as most federal states are democratic in structure if not practice with checks and balances; however, some federal monarchies, such as the United Arab Emirates, are based upon principles other than democracy.

Federal states primarily contrast with unitary states, where the central government retains many of the powers that are delegated to the subdivisions in federal republics. While there are exceptions, the overall tendency is for federal republics to be larger, more populous, and more internally heterogeneous than unitary states, with such larger size and internal heterogeneity being more manageable in a federal system than in a unitary one.

== Contemporary ==
Country	Official name and style	Administrative divisions	Form of government	Head of state	Head of government
Argentina	Argentine Republic	Provinces (23) and autonomous city (1)	Presidential system	Javier Milei	
Austria	Republic of Austria	States (9)	Semi-presidential system	Alexander Van der Bellen	Christian Stocker
Bosnia and Herzegovina	Bosnia and Herzegovina	Entities (2) and self-governing district (1)	Directorial Parliamentary republic	Željka Cvijanović, Denis Bećirović and Darijana Filipović	Borjana Krišto
Brazil	Federative Republic of Brazil	States (26) and federal district (1)	Presidential system	Luiz Inácio Lula da Silva	
Ethiopia	Federal Democratic Republic of Ethiopia	Regions (10) and chartered cities (2)	Parliamentary republic	Taye Atske Selassie	Abiy Ahmed
Germany	Federal Republic of Germany	States (16)	Parliamentary republic	Frank-Walter Steinmeier	Friedrich Merz
India	Republic of India	States (28) and union territories (8)	Parliamentary republic	Droupadi Murmu	Narendra Modi
Iraq	Republic of Iraq	Governorates (19)	Parliamentary republic	Nizar Amidi	Ali al-Zaidi
Mexico	United Mexican States	States (31) and autonomous entity (1)	Presidential system	Claudia Sheinbaum	
Micronesia	Federated States of Micronesia	States (4)	Presidential system	Wesley Simina	
Nepal	Nepal	Provinces (7)	Parliamentary republic	Ram Chandra Paudel	Balen Shah
Nigeria	Federal Republic of Nigeria	States (36) and federal territory (1)	Presidential system	Bola Tinubu	
Pakistan	Islamic Republic of Pakistan	Provinces (4), autonomous territories (2), and federal territory (1)	Parliamentary republic	Asif Ali Zardari	Shehbaz Sharif
Russia	Russian Federation	Federal subjects (83) (Note: This number is the exact number of the internationally recognized federal subjects of the country, excluding six other federal subjects that are internationally recognized as part of Ukraine.)	Semi-presidential system	Vladimir Putin	Mikhail Mishustin
Somalia	Federal Republic of Somalia	Federal member states (7) (Note: Including the partially recognized state of Somaliland.)	Parliamentary republic	Hassan Sheikh Mohamud	Hamza Abdi Barre
South Sudan	Republic of South Sudan	States (10), administrative areas (2), and areas with special administrative status (1)	Presidential system	Salva Kiir	
Sudan	Republic of the Sudan	States (18)	Military junta	Transitional Sovereignty Council	Kamil Idris
Switzerland	Swiss Confederation	Cantons (26)	Directorial Parliamentary republic	Federal Council	
United States	United States of America	States (50), federal district (1) and territories (14), nine of which are uninhabited.	Presidential system	Donald Trump	
Venezuela	Bolivarian Republic of Venezuela	States (23) and capital district (1)	Presidential system	Nicolás Maduro (de jure); Delcy Rodríguez (de facto)	

== Historical ==
Country	Official name and style	Period of federal form of government	Administrative divisions
Regency of Algiers	Regency of Algiers; Kingdom of Algiers	1563–1830	Beyliks
Polish–Lithuanian Commonwealth	Serenissima Res Publica Poloniae	1569–1795	Provinces and Voivodeships
Dutch Republic	Republic of the Seven United Netherlands	1581–1795	Provinces
Valais	Republic of the Seven Tithings	1613–1798	
Gran Colombia	Republic of Colombia	1819–1831	
Federal Republic of Central America	Federal Republic of Central American	1823–1838	
Granadine Confederation	Granadine Confederation	1858–1863	
United States of Colombia	United States of Colombia	1863–1886	States
First Spanish Republic	Spanish Republic	1873-1874	
Beiyang China	Republic of China	1912–1928	Provinces
Mountainous Republic of the Northern Caucasus	Mountainous Republic of the Northern Caucasus	1917–1922	Republics
Weimar Republic	German Reich	1919–1933	States
East Germany	German Democratic Republic	1949–1990	States
Soviet Union (Note: Nominally a federal union of multiple national republics; in practice its government and economy were highly centralized until its final years.)	Union of Soviet Socialist Republics	1922–1991	Republics
Yugoslavia	Federal People's Republic of Yugoslavia (1945–1963); Socialist Federal Republic of Yugoslavia (1963–1992)	1945–1992	Republics
Serbia and Montenegro	Federal Republic of Yugoslavia (1992–2003); State Union of Serbia and Montenegro (2003–2006)	1992–2006	Constituent republics
Burma	Union of Burma	1948–1962	States
Indonesia	Republic of the United States of Indonesia	1949–1950 (Note: The states lived on until a final treaty in 1956 in which Republic of South Maluku and the State of Eastern Sumatra agreed to devolve into the Republic of Indonesia.)	States
Cameroon	Federal Republic of Cameroon	1961–1972	
Czechoslovak Socialist Republic	Czechoslovak Republic (1948–1960); Czechoslovak Socialist Republic (1960–1990)	1969–1990	Republics
Czech and Slovak Federative Republic	Czech and Slovak Federative Republic	1990–1992	Republics

== See also ==
- Federal monarchy – Federation of states with a single main monarch and different state leaders
- Form of government
- List of republics
