= Sikandar Hayat Khan Sherpao =

Pakistani politician

Member of the Provincial Assembly of Khyber Pakhtunkhwa
- In office 2002 – 28 May 2018
- Constituency: Constituency PK-21 (Charsadda-V)

Personal details
- Party: QWP (2013-present)
- Parent: Aftab Ahmad Khan Sherpao (father)

Sikandar Hayat Khan Sherpao (سکندر حیات خان شیرپاؤ) is a Pakistani politician who had been a Member of the Provincial Assembly of Khyber Pakhtunkhwa, from 2002 to May 2018. He also served as Senior Minister for home and tribal affairs as well as irrigation department.

== Education ==
He has a degree in Bachelors in Arts and a degree in Bachelor of Business Administration.

== Political career ==
He was elected to the Provincial Assembly of the North-West Frontier Province as a candidate of Pakistan People's Party (S) (PPP-S) from Constituency PF-21 (Charsadda-V) in the 2002 Pakistani general election. He received 15,153 votes and defeated a candidate of Awami National Party (ANP).

He was re-elected to the Provincial Assembly of the North-West Frontier Province as a candidate of PPP-S from Constituency PF-21 (Charsadda-V) in the 2008 Pakistani general election. He received 12,303 votes and defeated a candidate of ANP.

He was re-elected to the Provincial Assembly of Khyber Pakhtunkhwa as a candidate of Qaumi Watan Party from Constituency PK-21 (Charsadda-V) in the 2013 Pakistani general election. He received 17,052 votes and defeated a candidate of Awami National Party. He took oath as senior minister for home and tribal affairs as well as irrigation department in October 2015 whereas he resigned from his post as senior minister in July 2017.
