= List of countries by federal system =

This article lists the various types of federal systems in different countries.

== Multinational system ==
=== European Union ===
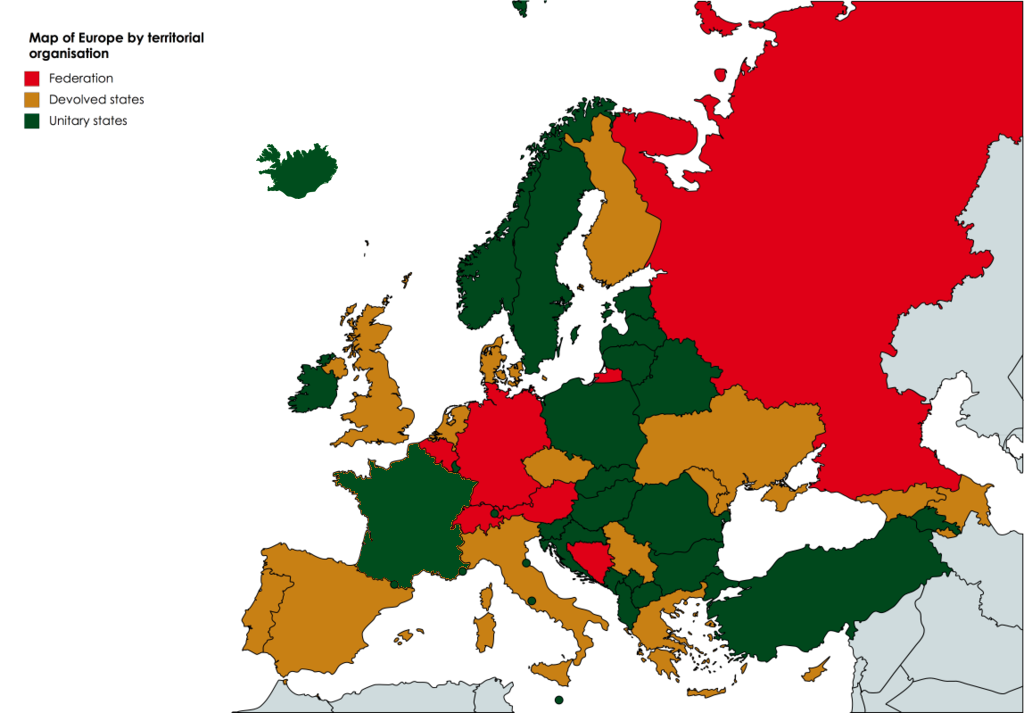
Territorial organisation of European countries

Following the end of World War II, several movements, including the Union of European Federalists and the European Movement (founded in 1948), began advocating a European federation. Those organizations exercised influence in the European unification process, but never in a decisive way.

Although the drafts of both the Maastricht Treaty and the Treaty establishing a Constitution for Europe mentioned federalism, the reference never made it to the text of the treaties adopted by consensus. The strongest advocates of European federalism have been Germany, Italy, Belgium and Luxembourg while those historically most strongly opposed have been the United Kingdom, Denmark and France (with conservative heads of state and governments). Since the presidency of François Mitterrand (1981–1995), the French authorities have adopted a much more pro-European Unification position, as they consider that a strong EU is presenting the best "insurance" against a unified Germany which might become too strong and thus a threat for its neighbours.

Those uncomfortable using the "F" word in the EU context should feel free to refer to it as a quasi-federal or federal-like system. Nevertheless, for the purposes of the analysis here, the EU has the necessary attributes of a federal system. It is striking that while many scholars of the EU continue to resist analyzing it as a federation, most contemporary students of federalism view the EU as a federal system (See for instance, Bednar, Filippov et al., McKay, Kelemen, Defigueido and Weingast). (R. Daniel Kelemen)

== Historical ==
=== Cameroon ===
The Federal Republic of Cameroon operated between 1961 and 1972.

=== Colombia ===
The United States of Colombia operated between 1863 and 1886.

=== Czechoslovakia ===
The Czechoslovak Socialist Republic from 1969 to 1990 and then the Czech and Slovak Federative Republic, until the Czech Republic and the Slovak Republic separated in 1993.

=== France ===
During the French Revolution, especially in 1793, "federalism" had an entirely different meaning. It was a political movement to weaken the central government in Paris by devolving power to the provinces.

=== Tanzania ===
The United Republic of Tanzania, formerly the United Republic of Tanganyika and Zanzibar, was the union of Tanganyika and Zanzibar, and maintained a two-part federal system. Currently it is a unitary state with Zanzibar as an autonomous administrative division.

=== Yugoslavia ===
After the end of World War II new FPR Yugoslavia was reorganised as a federation of six constituent republics. After the dissolution of the country, both newly established FR Yugoslavia and Bosnia and Herzegovina incorporated federal constitutional elements in their political system. The Federal Republic of Yugoslavia, from 1992 to 2003 was a federal state until it became a confederation titled the State Union of Serbia and Montenegro. This confederation expired 2006 as Montenegro declared its independence.

== Emirate system ==
=== United Arab Emirates ===
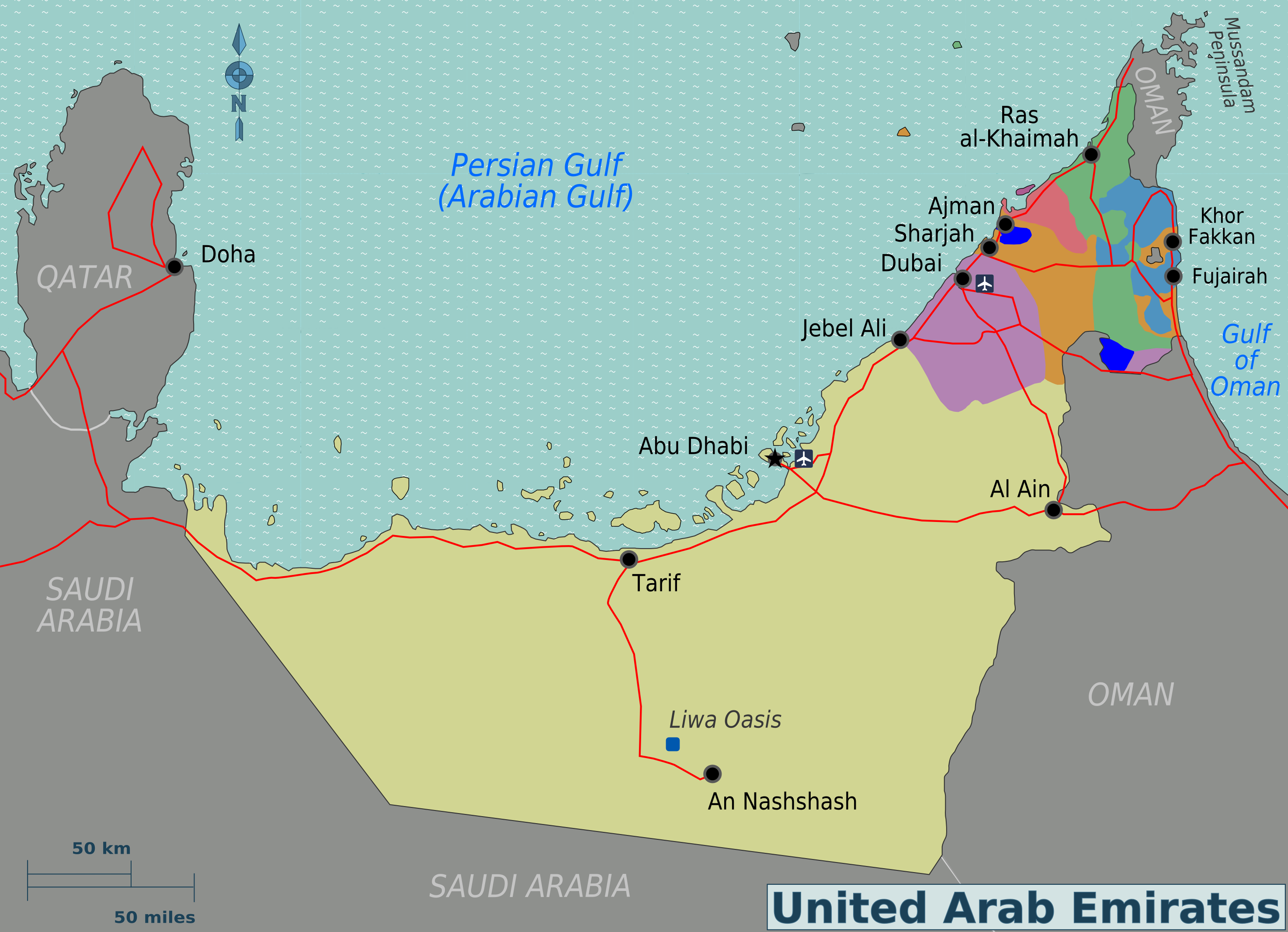
Map of the United Arab Emirates

The United Arab Emirates is a federal semi-constitutional monarchy of seven emirates. Each emirate is an absolute monarchy headed by a ruler from the six ruling families of the United Arab Emirates. The president of the United Arab Emirates is elected by the Federal Supreme Council, a body formed of the rulers of each emirate. The ruler of Abu Dhabi is de facto elected as the president of the United Arab Emirates, while the office of vice president and prime minister de facto held by the ruling family of Dubai.

== Provincial system ==
=== Argentina ===
Argentina is a federation made up of 23 provinces and its Federal Capital, Buenos Aires

Federalism in Argentina was the result of a long lasting debate and several civil wars after the May Revolution of 1810 and subsequently, the independence in 1816. There were several failed attempts to establish both unitary and federal governments. With the establishment of the first successful and current constitution in 1853, the debate was sealed and Argentina adopted a federal system.

At that time there were still several territories under federal administration which have since acquired provincial status, the last being the province of Tierra del Fuego in 1990. The city of Buenos Aires was established as the seat of the federal government in 1853 and put under federal administration in 1880. It remained under direct control of the federal government until the 1994 constitutional amendment with which it acquired its present autonomous status which gives it a very similar degree of autonomy as the provinces.

=== Canada ===
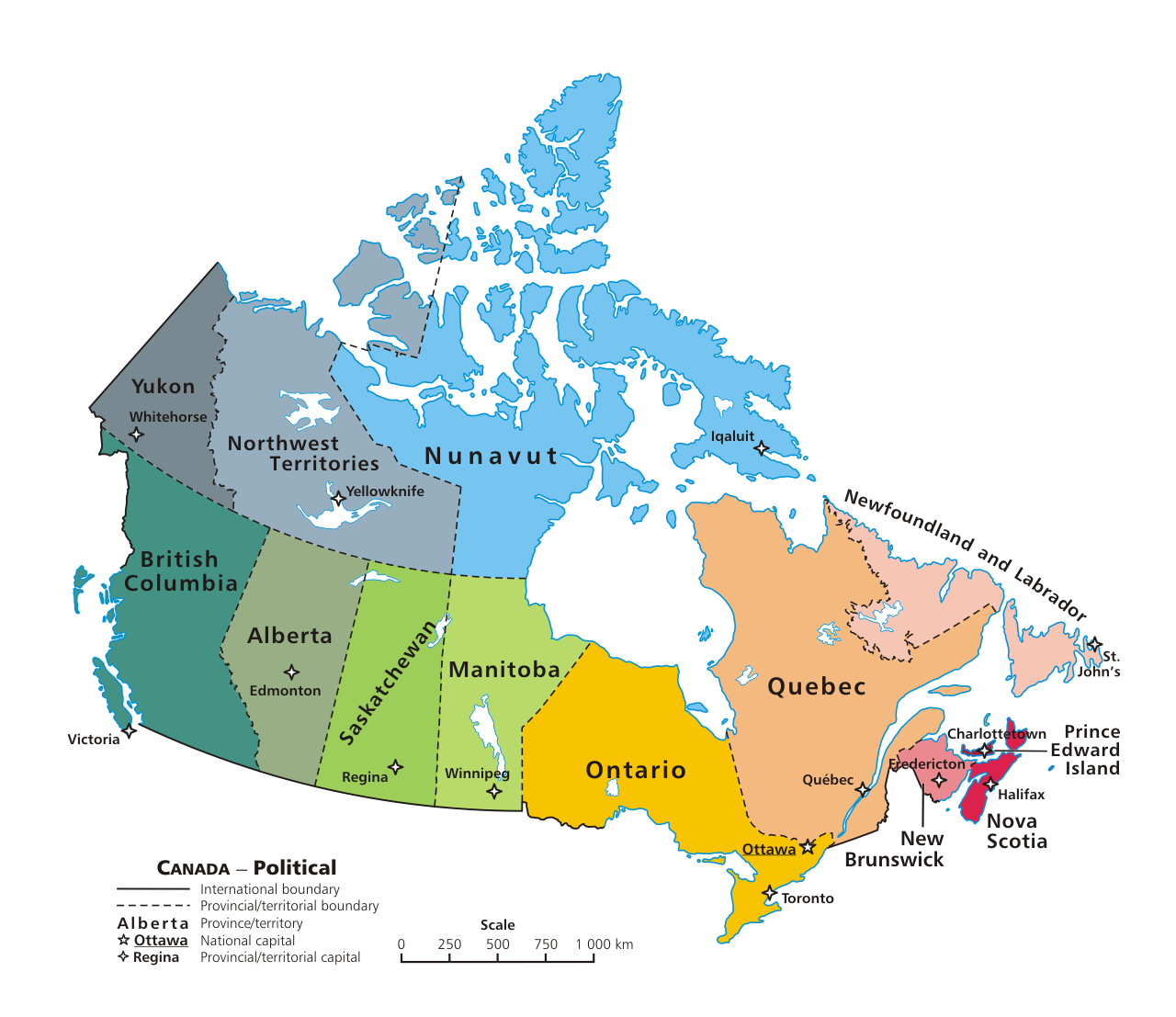
In Canada, the provincial governments derive all their powers directly from the constitution. In contrast, the territories are subordinate to the federal government and are delegated powers by it.

In Canada the system of federalism is described by the division of powers between the federal parliament and the country's provincial governments. Under the Constitution Act, 1867 (previously known as the British North America Act 1867), specific powers of legislation are allotted. Section 91 of the constitution gives rise to federal authority for legislation, whereas section 92 gives rise to provincial powers.

For matters not directly dealt with in the constitution, the federal government retains residual powers; however, conflicts between the two levels of government, relating to which level has legislative jurisdiction over various matters, have been a longstanding and evolving issue. Areas being contested include legislation with respect to regulation of the economy, taxation, and natural resources.

=== Nepal ===
Nepal is a country with geographical diversity. Nepal has been practising unitary form of government since unification by Prithvi Narayan Shah. However, this system was not able to achieve the development goals of the country and has been described as an "exclusive form of rule" by its critics. Federalism has been seen as the answer to solving regional inequality and reducing the economic, social and religious discrimination; the country has transformed into a federal structure as a result.

Nepal has become a federal democratic republican state since 28 May 2008 (15th Jestha, 2065 BS). According to the concept of a federal system, Nepal has been divided into 7 provinces, 77 districts and 753 local levels. Now each province has a separate government along with its federal government at the centre.

=== Pakistan ===
The Islamic Republic of Pakistan, consisting of its federal district, Islamabad Capital Territory, the provinces of the Punjab, Sindh, Balochistan, Khyber Pakhtunkhwa, and the territories of Azad Jammu and Kashmir and Gilgit-Baltistan.

Pakistan is a democratic federal parliamentary republic. Powers are shared between the federal government and the provinces. Relations between federation and provinces is defined in Part V (Articles 141–159) of the constitution.

Pakistan consists of four provinces and three territories, including the Islamabad Capital Territory.

== Mixed system ==
=== Russian Federation ===
Federal subjects of Russia. The Crimean peninsula, Donbas, Zaporizhzhia and Kherson Oblasts, internationally recognized as part of Ukraine, are shown with diagonal stripes.

The post-Imperial nature of Russian subdivision of government changed towards a generally autonomous model which began with the establishment of the USSR (of which Russia was governed as part). It was liberalized in the aftermath of the Soviet Union, with the reforms under Boris Yeltsin preserving much of the Soviet structure while applying increasingly liberal reforms to the governance of the constituent republics and subjects (while also coming into conflict with Chechen secessionist rebels during the Chechen War). Some of the reforms under Yeltsin were scaled back by Vladimir Putin.

All of Russia's subdivisional entities are known as subjects, with some smaller entities, such as the republics enjoying more autonomy than other subjects on account of having an extant presence of a culturally non-Russian ethnic minority or, in some cases, majority.

Currently, there are 83 federal subjects of Russia, excluding disputed territories in Ukraine. If those subjects are included, there are 89 federal subjects of the Russian Federation.

== State system ==
=== Australia ===
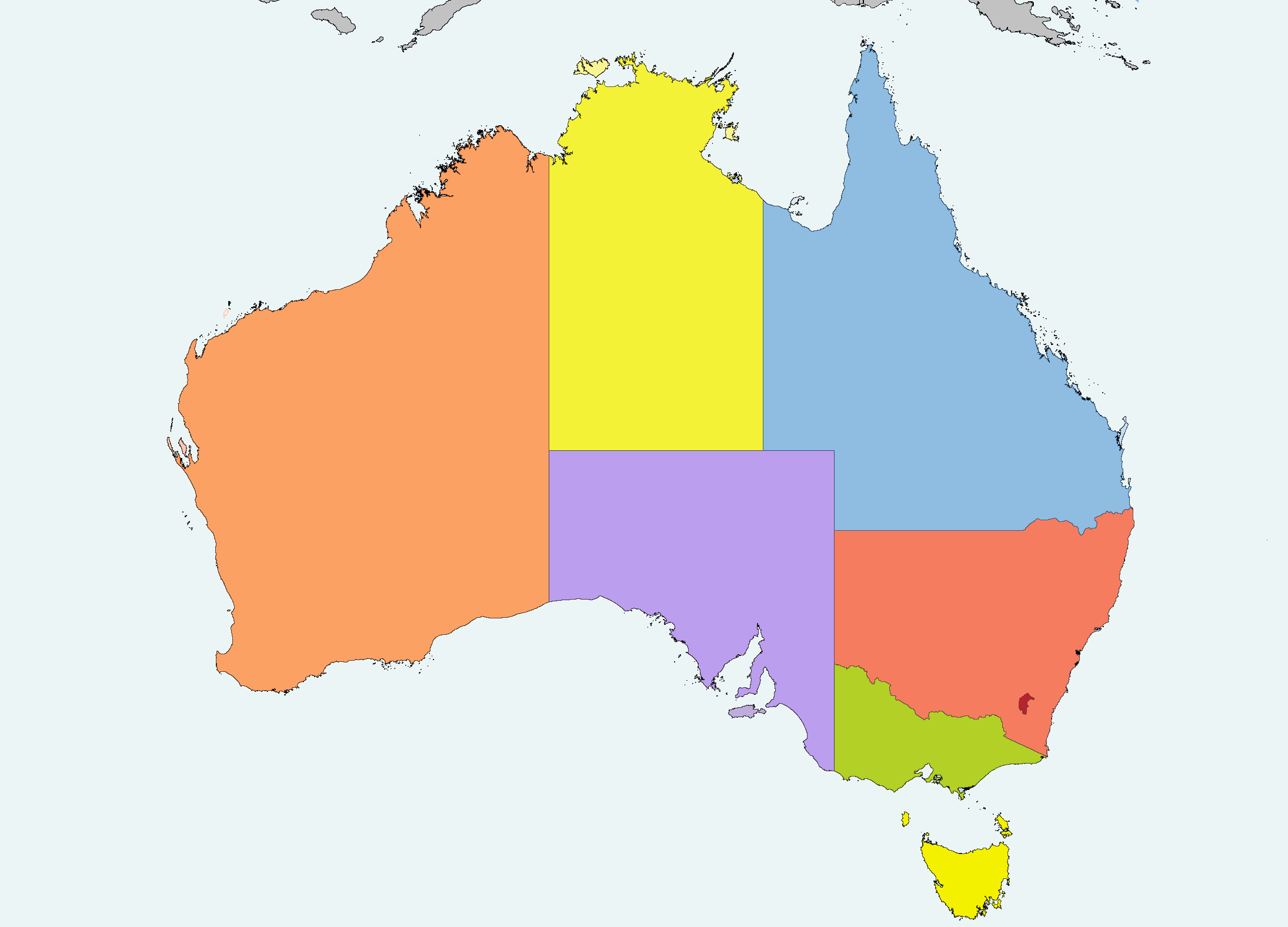
The Commonwealth of Australia, consisting of its federal district, Australian Capital Territory (red), the states of New South Wales (pink), Queensland (blue), South Australia (purple), Tasmania (yellow), Victoria (green), Western Australia (orange) and the federal territory of the Northern Territory (brown)

On 1 January 1901, the dominion of Australia officially came into existence as a federation. The Australian continent was colonised in 1788 by the United Kingdom, which subsequently established six, eventually self-governing, colonies there. In the 1890s the governments of these colonies all held referendums on becoming the unified, self-governing "Commonwealth of Australia" within the British Empire. When all the colonies voted in favour of federation, the Federation of Australia commenced, resulting in the establishment of the Commonwealth of Australia in 1901. The model of Australian federalism adheres closely to the original model of the United States of America, although it does so through a generally parliamentary Westminster system rather than a presidential system. Various aspects of the Parliament are more heavily inspired by the United States Congress however, notably the Senate.

=== Brazil ===
Brazil is a union of 26 states and its federal district which is the site of Brasília, the federal capital.

In Brazil, the fall of the monarchy in 1889 by a military coup d'état led to the rise of the presidential system, headed by Deodoro da Fonseca. Aided by well-known jurist Ruy Barbosa, Fonseca established federalism in Brazil by decree, but this system of government would be confirmed by every Brazilian constitution since 1891, although some of them would distort some of the federalist principles. The 1937 federal government had the authority to appoint State Governors (called intervenors) at will, thus centralizing power in the hands of President Getúlio Vargas. Brazil also uses the Fonseca system to regulate interstate trade. Brazil is one of the biggest federal governments.

The Brazilian Constitution of 1988 introduced a new component to the ideas of federalism, including municipalities as federal entities. Brazilian municipalities are now invested with some of the traditional powers usually granted to states in federalism.

=== Ethiopia ===
Ethiopia has over 80 ethno-linguistic groups and the new Constitution which was introduced in 1994, dividing Ethiopia on ethnic lines into nine regional states and two multiethnic "chartered administrations" (Addis Ababa and Diredawa). The states were given autonomy in legislative, executive and judicial functions, while there were provisions for ethnic groups to be represented in central institutions. Ethnic groups were granted the "unconditional right" to secession, although it is doubtful whether any group could in fact achieve this. The government was aiming not only to reduce inter-ethnic conflict but to equalise living standards in different areas and improve the working of public institutions locally.

=== Germany ===
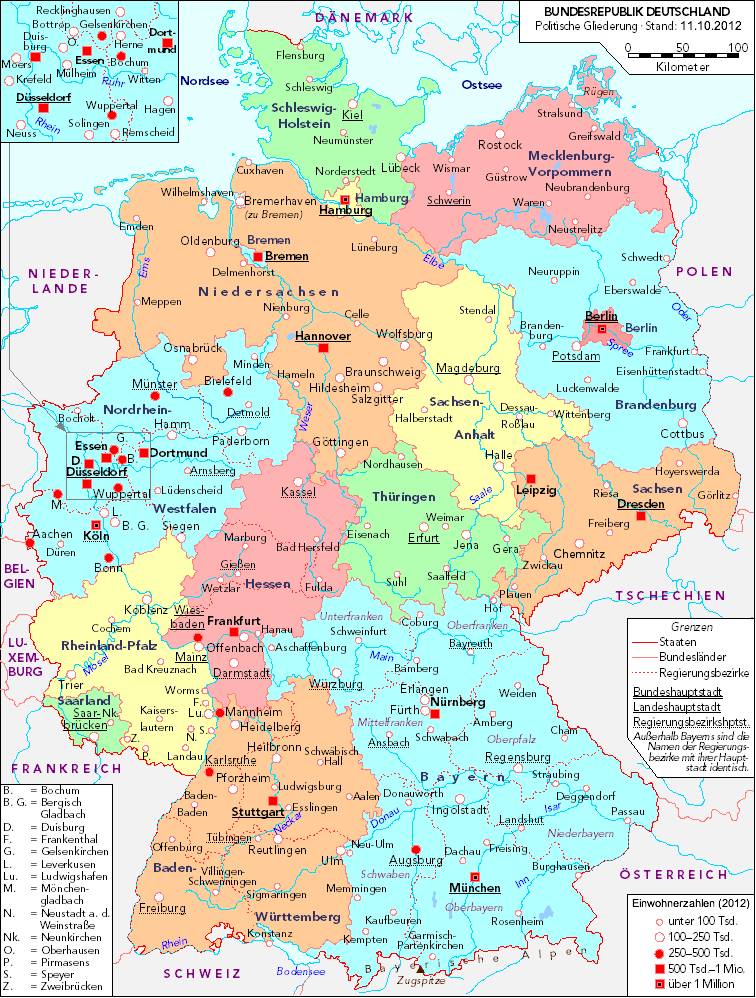
Federal states of Germany

Germany and the European Union present the only examples of federalism in the world where members of the federal "upper houses" (the German Bundesrat, i.e. the Federal Council; and the European Council) are neither elected nor appointed but comprise members or delegates of the governments of their constituents. The United States had a similar system until 1913, where prior to the 17th Amendment, Senators were delegates of the state elected by the state legislatures rather than the citizens.

Already the Holy Roman Empire, the Confederation of the Rhine, the German Confederation, the North German Confederation, the German Empire and the Weimar Republic were federal complexes of territories of different political structures. Modern Germany abandoned federalism only during Nazism (1933–1945, only de facto but not de jure) and in the German Democratic Republic (1952–1990). Adolf Hitler viewed federalism as an obstacle to his goals. As he wrote in Mein Kampf, "National Socialism must claim the right to impose its principles on the whole German nation, without regard to what were hitherto the confines of federal states."

Accordingly, the idea of a strong, centralized government has very negative connotations in German politics, although the progressive political movements in Germany (Liberals, Social Democrats) were advocating at the time of the Second German Empire (1871–1918) to abolish (or to reshape) the majority of German federated states of that era, as they were considered to be mostly monarchist remnants of the feudal structures of the Middle Ages.

=== India ===
A map showing India's 28 states and eight union territories including the National Capital Territory of Delhi

The Government of India (referred to as the Union Government) is the governing authority of a federal union of 28 states and 8 union territories.

The government of India is based on a three tiered system, in which the Constitution of India delineates the subjects on which each tier of government has executive powers. The Constitution originally provided for a two-tier system of government, the Union Government (also known as the Central Government), representing the Union of India, and the State governments. Later, a third tier was added in the form of Panchayats and Municipalities. In the current arrangement, The Seventh Schedule of the Indian Constitution delimits the subjects of each level of governmental jurisdiction, dividing them into three lists:

- Union List includes subjects of national importance such as defence of the country, foreign affairs, banking, communications and currency. The Union Government alone can make laws relating to the subjects mentioned in the Union List. This list is about portfolios concerning the country as one or inter-state transaction.
- State List contains subjects of state and local importance such as police, trade, commerce, agriculture and irrigation. The State Governments alone can make laws relating to the subjects mentioned in the State List.
- Concurrent List includes subjects of common interest to both the Union Government as well as the State Governments, such as education, forest, trade unions, marriage, adoption and succession. Both the Union as well as the State Governments can make laws on the subjects mentioned in this list. If their laws conflict with each other, the law made by the Union Government will prevail.

==== Asymmetric federalism ====
A distinguishing aspect of Indian federalism is that unlike many other forms of federalism, it is asymmetric and gives limited autonomy to only some Indian states. Article 370 of the Constitution of India made special provisions for the state of Jammu and Kashmir as per its Instrument of Accession but it was revoked in 2019. Article 371 makes special provisions for the states of Andhra Pradesh, Arunachal Pradesh, Assam, Goa, Gujarat, Karnataka, Maharashtra, Manipur, Mizoram, Nagaland and Sikkim as per their accession or state-hood deals. One more aspect of Indian federalism is the system of President's Rule in which the central government (through its appointed Governor) takes control of a state's administration for certain months when no party can form a government in the state or there is violent disturbance in the state.

==== Coalition politics ====
Although the constitution does not say so, India is now a multilingual federation. India has a multi-party system, with political allegiances frequently based on linguistic and regional identities, necessitating coalition politics, especially at the Union level. India has currently two main national political alliances, the Bharatiya Janata Party-led NDA and Indian National Congress-led INDIA.

=== Malaysia ===
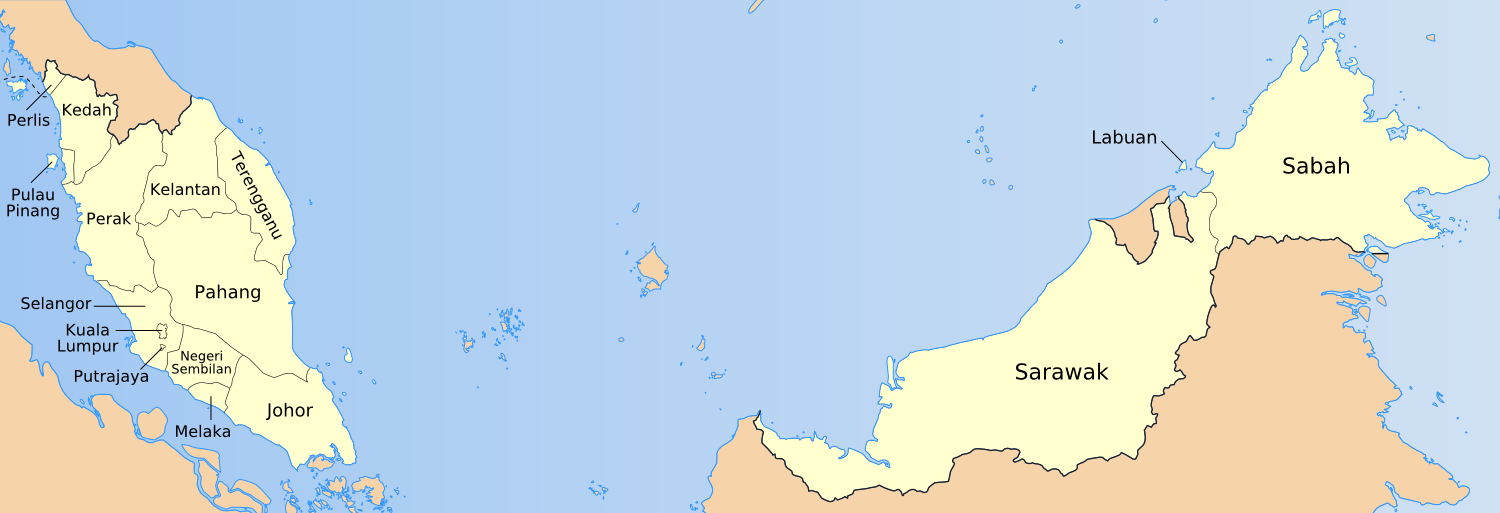
Map of Malaysia with its states

Malaysia is a federal constitutional monarchy. Its monarchy is elective, with the nine rulers and four state leaders (representing states with their respective sultanates abolished) meet at the Conference of Rulers to elect the next monarch every five years, or if the position becomes vacant for any reason. There is also a custom of rotation of the monarchy between the nine rulers. A legacy of British colonial rule, the federation's system of government is modelled closely on the Westminster parliamentary system. There exists a lower and upper house. Governance of the states is divided between the federal and the state governments, with different powers reserved for each, and the federal government has direct administration of the federal territories. Legislative powers are divided between state and federal assemblies, with elections being held every five years.

Before British rule, Malaysia as it is today, was composed of separate sultanates and states. The Federated Malay States was the first instance of federalism being introduced in the Malay Peninsula. Penang, Malacca and Singapore were ruled as part of the Straits Settlements. In Borneo, British North Borneo joined the federation as the state of Sabah, along with a briefly independent Raj of Sarawak as the state of Sarawak. Singapore became independent after being ejected from the federation, due to differences between the central government and the state's own People's Action Party, which still rules Singapore until today.

The nature of Malaysia's formation from various levels of colonial administrations made its federal government very extensive and highly centralised akin to a unitary state, its power became more consolidated during Mahathir Mohamad's term as prime minister.

=== Mexico ===
Mexico is a federal republic composed of 32 federative entities (Spanish: entidades federativas): 31 states and Mexico City. According to the Constitution of Mexico, the states of the federation are free and sovereign in all matters concerning their internal affairs. Since 2016, Mexico City has been a fully autonomous entity on par with the states. Each state federative entity has its own congress and constitution.

=== Nigeria ===
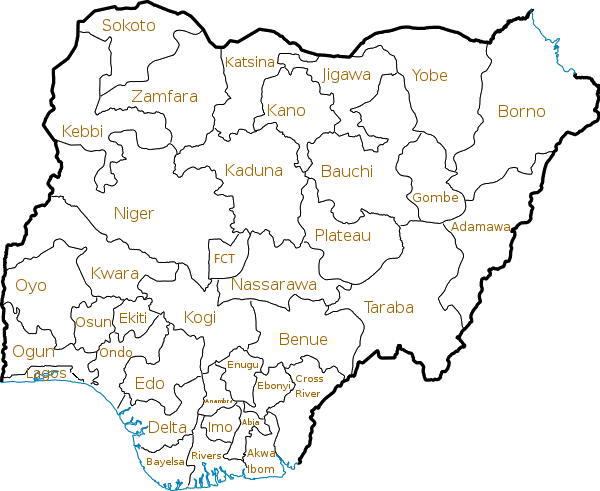
A map of the Federal Republic of Nigeria, showing its 36 states and 1 Federal Capital Territory

The Federal Republic of Nigeria has various states which have evolved over time due to complex socioeconomic issues as well as the effect of their colonial era. However, in modern Nigeria there are 36 states and one federal capital territory: Abia, Adamawa, Akwa Ibom, Anambra, Bauchi, Bayelsa, Benue, Borno, Cross River, Delta, Ebonyi, Enugu, Edo, Ekiti, Gombe, Imo, Jigawa, Kaduna, Kano, Katsina, Kebbi, Kogi, Kwara, Lagos, Nasarawa, Niger, Ogun, Ondo, Osun, Oyo, Plateau, Rivers, Sokoto, Taraba, Yobe, and Zamfara, and the Federal Capital Territory (FCT).

=== United States ===
Federalism in the United States is the evolving relationship between state governments and the federal government of the United States. American government has evolved from a system of dual federalism to one of associative federalism. In "Federalist No. 46", James Madison asserted that the states and national government "are in fact but different agents and trustees of the people, constituted with different powers." Alexander Hamilton, writing in "Federalist No. 28", suggested that both levels of government would exercise authority to the citizens' benefit: "If their [the peoples'] rights are invaded by either, they can make use of the other as the instrument of redress."

The United States is composed of 50 self-governing states, along with a capital and several territories that are administered by the federal government.

Because the states were pre-existing political entities (although almost none was ever an independent state, rather colonies, provinces or later created entities), the U.S. Constitution did not need to define or explain federalism in any one section but it often mentions the rights and responsibilities of state governments and state officials in relation to the federal government. The federal government has certain express powers (also called enumerated powers) which are powers spelled out in the Constitution, including the right to levy taxes, declare war, and regulate interstate and foreign commerce. In addition, the Necessary and Proper Clause gives the federal government the implied power to pass any law "necessary and proper" for the execution of its express powers. Other powers—the reserved powers—are reserved to the people or the states. The power delegated to the federal government was significantly expanded by the Supreme Court decision in McCulloch v. Maryland (1819), amendments to the Constitution following the Civil War, and by some later amendments—as well as the overall claim of the Civil War, that the states were legally subject to the final dictates of the federal government.

The Federalist Party of the United States was opposed by the Democratic-Republicans, including powerful figures such as Thomas Jefferson. The Democratic-Republicans mainly believed that: the Legislature had too much power (mainly because of the Necessary and Proper Clause) and that they were unchecked; the Executive had too much power, and that there was no check on the executive; a dictator would arise; and that a bill of rights should be coupled with the constitution to prevent a potential dictator from exploiting or tyrannizing citizens. The federalists said that it was impossible to list all the rights, and those that were not listed could be easily overlooked because they were not in the official bill of rights. Rather, rights in specific cases were to be decided by the judicial system of courts.

After the American Civil War, the federal government increased greatly in influence on everyday life and in size relative to the state governments. Reasons included the need to regulate businesses and industries that span state borders, attempts to secure civil rights, and the provision of social services. The federal government acquired no substantial new powers until the acceptance by the Supreme Court of the Sherman Antitrust Act.

From 1938 until 1995, the U.S. Supreme Court did not invalidate any federal statute as exceeding Congress' power under the Commerce Clause. Most actions by the federal government can find some legal support among the express powers, such as the Commerce Clause, whose applicability has been narrowed by the Supreme Court in recent years. In 1995, the Supreme Court rejected the Gun-Free School Zones Act in the Lopez decision, and also rejected the civil remedy portion of the Violence Against Women Act of 1994 in the United States v. Morrison decision. Recently, the Commerce Clause was interpreted to include marijuana laws in the Gonzales v. Raich decision.

Dual federalism holds that the federal government and the state governments are co-equals, each sovereign.

However, since the Civil War Era, the national courts often interpret the federal government as the final judge of its own powers under dual federalism. The establishment of Native American governments (which are separate and distinct from state and federal government) exercising limited powers of sovereignty, has given rise to the concept of "bi-federalism".

=== Venezuela ===
Map of the Venezuelan federation

The Federal War ended in 1864 with the signing of the Treaty of Coche by both the centralist government of the time and the Federal Forces. The United States of Venezuela were subsequently incorporated under a "Federation of Sovereign States" upon principles borrowed from the Articles of Confederation of the United States of America. In this Federation, each State had a "President" of its own that controlled almost every issue, even the creation of "State Armies," while the Federal Army was required to obtain presidential permission to enter any given state.

However, more than 140 years later, the original system has gradually evolved into a quasi-centralist form of government. While the 1999 Constitution still defines Venezuela as a Federal Republic, it abolished the Senate, transferred competences of the States to the Federal Government and granted the President of the Republic vast powers to intervene in the States and Municipalities.

== Two component system ==
=== Belgium ===
Federalism in the Kingdom of Belgium is an evolving system.

Belgian federalism is a twin system which reflects both the

- linguistic communities of the country, French (ca. 40% of the total population), Dutch (ca. 59%), and to a much lesser extent German (ca. 1%) and the
- geographically defined Regions (federated States: Brussels-Capital (de facto Greater Brussels), Flanders and Wallonia). The last two correspond to the language areas in Belgium, Wallonia hosting both the bulk of the French-speaking population and the German-speaking minority. In Brussels, ca. 80% of the population speaks French and ca. 20% Dutch with the city being an enclave of the Flemish region and officially a bilingual area.
- Flanders is the region associated with Belgium's Dutch-speaking majority, i.e. the Flemish Community.
- Due to its relatively small size (approximately one percent) the German-speaking Community of Belgium does not have much influence on national politics.
- Wallonia is a French-speaking area, except for the German-speaking so-called East Cantons (Cantons de l'est). French is the second most spoken mother tongue of Belgium, after Dutch. Within the French-speaking Community of Belgium, there is a geographical and political distinction between Wallonia and Brussels for historical and sociological reasons. Historically, the Walloons were for a federalism with three components and the Flemings for two. This difference is one of the elements which makes the Belgian issue so complicated. The Flemings wanted to defend their culture while the Walloons wanted to defend their political and economical supremacy they had in the 19th century: "It is true that the Walloon movement, which has never stopped affirming that Wallonia is part of the French cultural area, has never made this cultural struggle a priority, being more concerned to struggle against its status as a political minority and the economic decline which was only a corollary to it".

On one hand, this means that the Belgian political landscape, generally speaking, consists of only two components: the Dutch-speaking population represented by Dutch-language political parties, and the majority populations of Wallonia and Brussels, represented by their French-speaking parties. The Brussels region emerges as a third component. This specific dual form of federalism, with the special position of Brussels, consequently has a number of political issues—even minor ones—that are being fought out over the Dutch/French-language political division. With such issues, a final decision is possible only in the form of a compromise. This tendency gives this dual federalism model a number of traits that generally are ascribed to confederalism, and makes the future of Belgian federalism contentious.

Belgian federalism is federated with three components. An affirmative resolution concerning Brussels' place in the federal system passed in the parliaments of Wallonia and Brussels. These resolutions passed against the desires of Dutch-speaking parties, who are generally in favour of a federal system with two components (i.e. the Dutch and French Communities of Belgium). However, the Flemish representatives in the Parliament of the Brussels Capital-Region voted in favour of the Brussels resolution, with the exception of one party. The chairman of the Walloon Parliament stated on July 17, 2008, that "Brussels would take an attitude". Brussels' parliament passed the resolution on July 18, 2008:

"The Parliament of the Brussels-Capital Region approves with great majority a resolution claiming the presence of Brussels itself at the negotiations of the reformation of the Belgian State."

This aspect of Belgian federalism helps to explain the difficulties of partition; Brussels, with its importance, is linked to both Wallonia and Flanders and vice versa. This situation, however, does not erase the traits of a confederation in the Belgian system.

=== Bosnia and Herzegovina ===
Bosnia and Herzegovina is a federation of two entities: Republika Srpska and Federation of Bosnia and Herzegovina, the latter itself a federation.

=== Iraq ===
Official flag of Kurdistan Region of Iraq (flag ratio is 2:3)

Iraq adapted a federal system on 15 October 2005, and formed the Kurdistan Region as the country's first and currently only federal region, with the method of creating federal entities enshrined in the Constitution of Iraq.

=== St. Kitts and Nevis ===
St. Kitts and Nevis is a federation of two entities: The island of St. Kitts and the island of Nevis. Uniquely while Nevis has its own semi-autonomous Nevis Island Assembly, St Kitts is directly administered by the federal National Assembly and lacks its own devolved government.

== Partial federal system ==
=== South Africa ===
Although South Africa bears some elements of a federal system, such as the allocation of certain powers to provinces, it is nevertheless constitutionally and functionally a devolved unitary state.

=== Spain ===
Spain is a unitary state with a high level of decentralisation, often regarded as a federal system in all but name or a "federation without federalism". The country has been quoted as being "an extraordinarily decentralized country", with the central government accounting for just 18% of public spending, 38% for the regional governments, 13% for the local councils, and the remaining 31% for the social security system. The current Spanish constitution has been implemented in such a way that, in many respects, Spain can be compared to countries which are undeniably federal.

However, in order to manage the tensions present in the Spanish transition to democracy, the drafters of the current Spanish constitution avoided giving labels such as 'federal' to the territorial arrangements. Besides, unlike in the federal system, the main taxes are taken centrally from Madrid (except for the Basque Country and Navarre, which were recognized in the Spanish democratic constitution as charter territories drawing from historical reasons) and then distributed to the Autonomous Communities.

An explicit and legal recognition of federalism as such has been promoted by parties such as Podemos, United Left and the Spanish Socialist Workers' Party. The Spanish Socialist party considered the idea of enshrining a federal Spain in 2012, as meeting point between separatist and recentralizing proposals.

=== Italy ===
Map of Italy

Italy is a unitary state with a high degree of regional decentralisation and asymmetric autonomy. Five regions — Friuli-Venezia Giulia, Sardinia, Sicily, Trentino-Alto Adige/Südtirol and Valle d’Aosta/Vallée d’Aoste — have special forms and conditions of autonomy under special statutes adopted by constitutional law."La Costituzione – Articolo 116" (in Italian). Senate of the Republic. Trentino-Alto Adige/Südtirol is constitutionally composed of the Autonomous Province of Trento and the Autonomous Province of Bolzano.

The autonomous regions and provinces exercise significant legislative, administrative and financial powers. The Italian constitutional system therefore has some federal-like characteristics, but Italy is not a federation in the constitutional sense and is generally classified as a unitary or regionalised state."La Costituzione – Titolo V" (in Italian). Government of Italy.

The autonomy of South Tyrol and Aosta Valley has sometimes been compared with the territorial autonomies of the Basque Country and Navarre, although the constitutional, fiscal and institutional arrangements are different. In particular, the Basque Country and Navarre have a distinctive foral fiscal system, whereas the autonomous provinces and regions of Italy operate within the Italian constitutional framework.

Unlike the Basque Country’s Ertzaintza and Mossos d’Esquadra in Catalonia, Italy’s autonomous regions do not generally possess a regional general-purpose police force exercising the principal public-order and security functions of a national police service. Under Article 117 of the Italian Constitution, public order and public security are matters of exclusive state legislation, while local administrative policing is excluded from this reservation."La Costituzione – Articolo 117" (in Italian). Senate of the Republic. Autonomous territories nevertheless have local and specialised police bodies; for example, Aosta Valley has the Corpo forestale della Valle d’Aosta and municipal police, alongside the national Polizia di Stato and Carabinieri."Componenti" (in Italian). Aosta Valley regional government.

== Proposed ==
It has been proposed in several unitary states to establish a federal system, for various reasons.

=== China ===
China is the largest unitary state in the world by both population and land area. Although China has had long periods of central rule for centuries, it is often argued that the unitary structure of the Chinese government is far too unwieldy to effectively and equitably manage the country's affairs. Chinese nationalists are suspicious of decentralization as a form of secessionism and a backdoor for national disunity; still others argue that the degree of autonomy given to provincial-level officials in the People's Republic of China amounts to a de facto federalism.

=== Cyprus ===
The 1960 Constitution of Cyprus was based on the idea of a two-part federalisation, but the union of Greek Cypriots and Turkish Cypriots failed.

=== Indonesia ===
Indonesia had been in federation from 1949, and dissolved in 1950. Since then, many people, especially in the 2000s, proposed Indonesia to go back to federated, but on different systems.

On May 20, 2019, the former Chief Justice of the Constitutional Court of Indonesia who is also an expert on constitutional law Mahfud MD gave his response regarding the proposal of the Unitary State of the Republic of Indonesia to return to the United States of Indonesia. He stated that Indonesia could be federated again if people agreed. He also stated that if people agreed to go back to federation, the Indonesian government could make a new resultante.

A new amendment is proposed because people, especially East Indonesians, argue that the unitary system makes East Indonesians feel disappointed with the existence of distributive justice that is far from expectations, a discriminatory political system, to the oligarchy that has gripped strongly from the center of power to the regions.

=== Libya ===
Shortly after the 2011 civil war, some people in Cyrenaica (in the eastern region of the country) began to call for the new regime to be federal, with the traditional three regions of Libya (Cyrenaica, Tripolitania, and Fezzan) being the constituent units. A group calling itself the "Cyrenaican Transitional Council" issued a declaration of autonomy on 6 March 2012; this move was rejected by the National Transitional Council in Tripoli.

=== Myanmar ===
The changes in the state structure that composes the national government in Naypyitaw and the state/regional governments and the federal negotiations between the national government and ethnic minority armed forces said to be the first step of federalism in Myanmar. Former president of Myanmar, Thein Sein supported the federalization of Myanmar as he said federalization can promote national stability.

=== Philippines ===
11 proposed states for the proposed Federal Republic of the Philippines

The Philippines is a unitary state with some powers devolved to Local Government Units (LGUs) under the terms of the Local Government Code. There is also one autonomous region, Bangsamoro. Over the years, various modifications have been proposed to the Constitution of the Philippines, including possible transition to a federal system as part of a shift to a semi-presidential system. In 2004, Philippine President Gloria Macapagal Arroyo established the Consultative Commission which suggested such a Charter Change but no action was taken by the Philippine Congress to amend the 1987 Constitution. The push for federalism was again revived under the administration of Rodrigo Duterte in 2016.

=== Sri Lanka ===
Federalism has long been advocated as a means of resolving the ethnic issues and unbalanced development in Sri Lanka. As the unitary state has resulted in uneven development across Sri Lanka the Western Province dominates over the other 8 provinces. Despite declining regional disparity Western province continues to contribute most to the Gross Domestic Product (GDP) contributing 42% of the GDP while the second highest the Southern Province only represents 10.8% of the GDP while Uva and Northern provinces representing the least with 5% and 3.6% respectively. Other provinces also have trouble attracting capitals. This has resulted in calls for the abolishing of the unitary system and powers being devolved.

=== Syria ===
The federalization of Syria has been proposed as a way to end the Syrian Civil War. In the broadest sense, it means turning the centralized Syrian Arab Republic into a federal republic with autonomous subdivisions. Many powers and actors involved in the Syrian Civil War have entertained the idea of "federal division", not least among them Russia, United Nations representatives, and the United States. President Bashar al-Assad has not ruled out the possibility of a federal democratic state of Syria. In particular, Turkey is strongly hostile towards the idea of a federalization of Syria because it fears possible repercussions for its own highly centralized state.

Due to the fact that federalization would more or less follow ethnic and possibly also religious-sectarian lines, it has been dismissed as "division of the country" and "Balkanization" by its opponents. Mainstream institutions of the Syrian opposition based in Turkey or Qatar like the Syrian National Council and the National Coalition for Syrian Revolutionary and Opposition Forces have consistently rejected the idea of federalization, while in particular Kurds in Syria have promoted the idea. The Egypt-based opposition party Syria's Tomorrow Movement takes an intermediate position.

=== United Kingdom ===
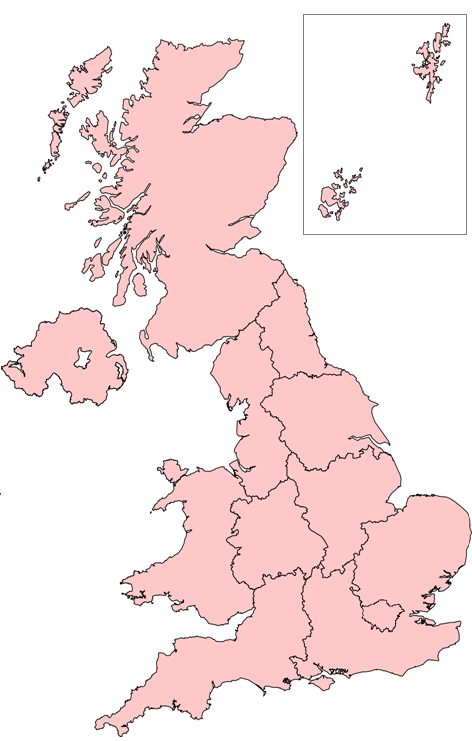
Map of the countries of the United Kingdom and regions of England

In the United Kingdom, an Imperial Federation was once seen as (inter alia) a method of solving the Home Rule problem in Ireland; in the late nineties, the Liberal Democrates proposed it as a solution to the "Irish Problem" and the "West Lothian question".

The United Kingdom has traditionally been governed as a unitary state by the Westminster Parliament in London. Instead of adopting a federal model, the UK has relied on gradual devolution to decentralise political power. Devolution in the UK began with the Government of Ireland Act 1914 which granted home rule to Ireland as a constituent country of the former United Kingdom of Great Britain and Ireland. Following the partition of Ireland in 1921 which saw the creation of the sovereign Irish Free State (which eventually evolved into the modern day Republic of Ireland), Northern Ireland retained its devolved government through the Parliament of Northern Ireland, the only part of the UK to have such a body at this time. This body was suspended in 1972 and Northern Ireland was governed by direct rule during the period of conflict known as The Troubles.

In modern times, a process of devolution in the United Kingdom has decentralised power once again. Since the 1997 referendums in Scotland and Wales and the Good Friday Agreement in Northern Ireland, three of the four constituent countries of the UK now have some level of autonomy. Government has been devolved to the Scottish Parliament, the National Assembly for Wales and the Northern Ireland Assembly. England does not have its own parliament and English affairs continue to be decided by the Westminster Parliament. In 1998 a set of eight unelected Regional assemblies, or chambers, was created to support the English Regional Development Agencies, but these were abolished between 2008 and 2010. The Regions of England continue to be used in certain governmental administrative functions.

Critics of devolution often cite the West Lothian question, which refers to the voting power of non-English MPs on matters affecting only England in the UK Parliament. Scottish and Welsh nationalism have been increasing in popularity, and since the 2014 Scottish independence referendum there has been a wider debate about the UK adopting a federal system with each of the four home nations having its own, equal devolved legislatures and law-making powers.

UK federal government was proposed as early as 1912 by the Member of Parliament for Dundee, Winston Churchill, in the context of the legislation for Irish Home Rule. In a speech in Dundee on 12 September, he proposed that England should also be governed by regional parliaments, with power devolved to areas such as Lancashire, Yorkshire, the Midlands and London as part of a federal system of government.

=== Yemen ===
The 2013–2014 National Dialogue Conference concluded that Yemen would adopt federalism in an attempt to resolve the political crisis that began with the Yemeni Revolution in 2011. Under the federal system, Yemen's full name would become the Federal Republic of Yemen. A committee organized by Yemeni President Abdrabbuh Mansur Hadi determined that Yemen would be split into six federal regions: Azal, Saba, Tihama, Aden, Janad, and Hadhramaut. Azal, Saba, Janad and Tihama would have been northern provinces whereas Aden and Hadhramaut would have been southern. Sana'a, the capital, was to become a federal city and would not have been part of any region. Aden, the former capital of South Yemen, would have been a part of the Aden region, but would have had special legislative and executive powers. Each region was to be further divided into states, which would have taken the place of Yemen's existing governorates. The conclusions of the Conference formed the basis of a new constitution, which was to be put to a referendum in 2015.

The plan for a six-region federation received international praise, but was denounced by many within Yemen. The Southern Movement suspected that the division of the south into two regions was an attempt to turn southern secessionists against each other; they preferred a two-region division between the north and the south. The Zaidi elites in the Azal region would have been left with almost no natural resources, whereas the sparsely populated Saba and Hadhramaut regions would have received nearly all of the country's natural resources. Meanwhile, the Houthis were outraged that the plan would have landlocked their home governorate of Saada. The referendum on the new federal constitution was indefinitely delayed by the intensification of the Yemeni Civil War in 2015. Some commentators have cited Hadi's federalization plan as one of the main causes of the civil war.

On 20 June 2023, the National Hadhrami Council was formed marking the first steps for the transformation.

== See also ==
- Federated state
