= History of administrative divisions of Czechoslovakia =

This article deals with historic administrative divisions of Czechoslovakia up to 1992, when the country was split into the Czech Republic and Slovakia.

For the current divisions of those two countries, see their main articles and the articles Regions of Slovakia and Regions of the Czech Republic.

== History ==
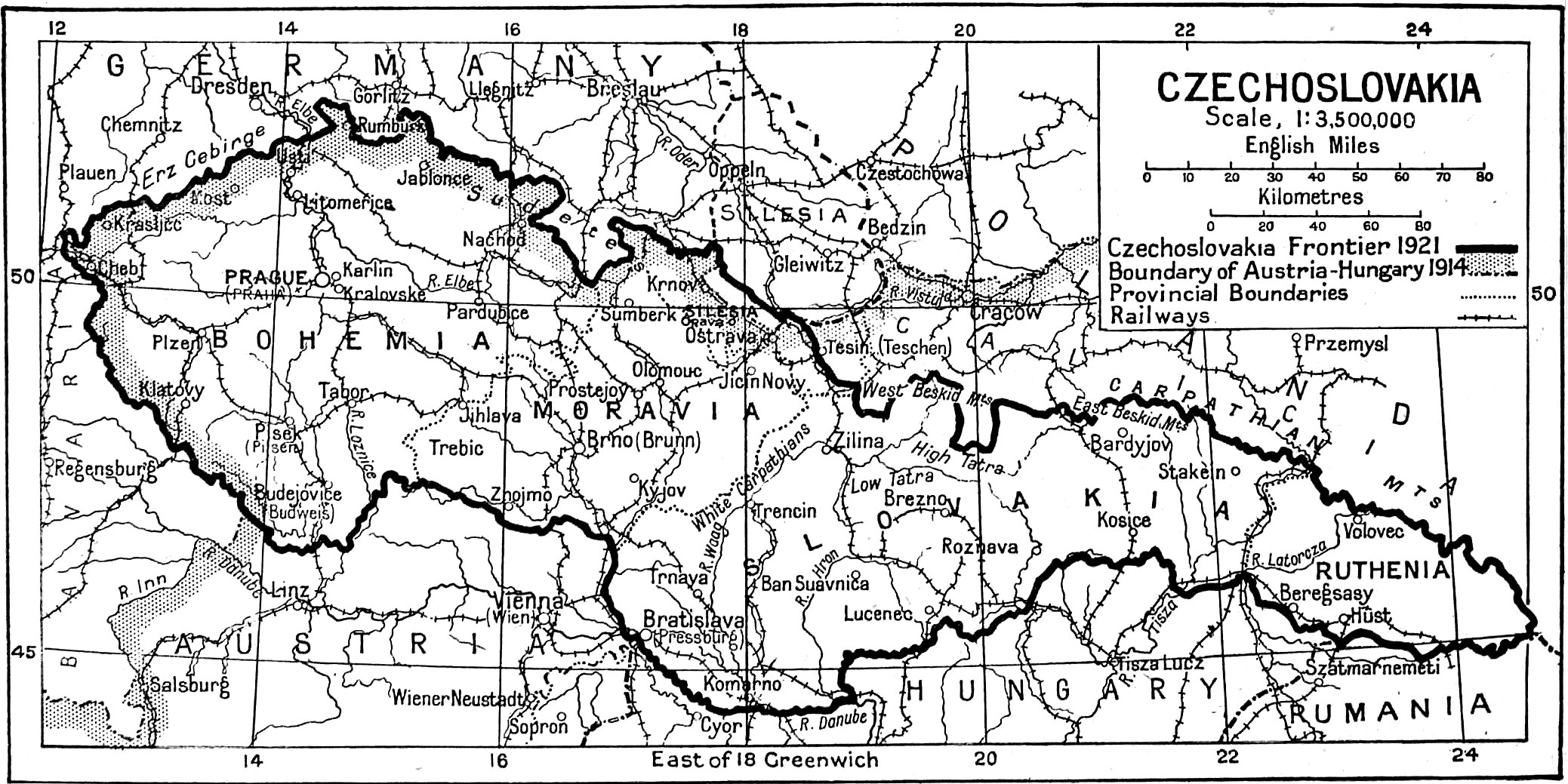
Czechoslovakia between 1918 and 1928, with five provinces or lands. Slovakia and Subcarpathian Rus newly created.

Czechoslovakia from December 1, 1928; the state administration was unified in both the former Austrian and Hungarian parts of the state, while the number of provinces was reduced to four (Moravia and Czech Silesia merged).

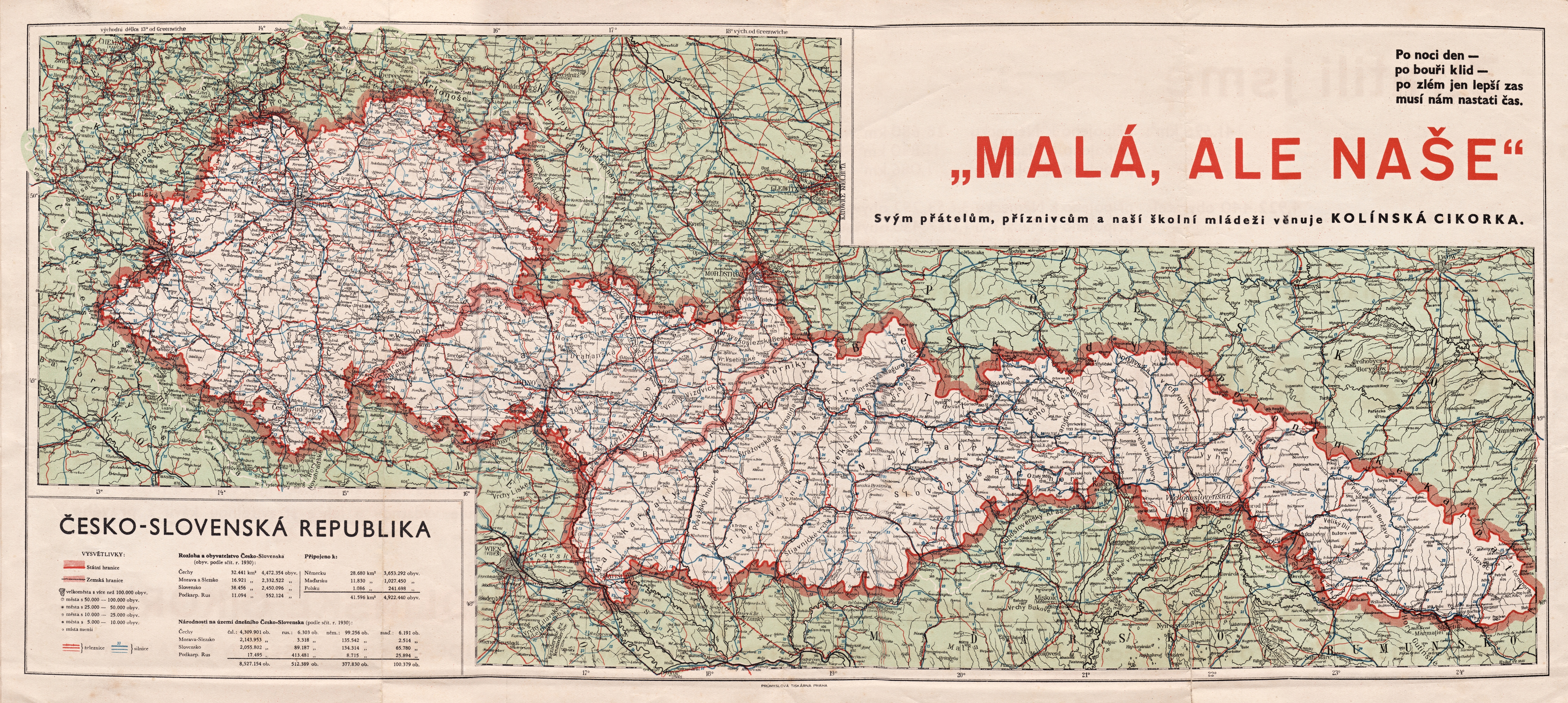
"Small, but ours": Czechoslovakia in 1938–39, with Slovakia and Subcarpathian Ruthenia as autonomous regions while the Sudetenland and southern Slovakia and Subcarpathian Ruthenia are ceded to Nazi Germany and Hungary

- 1918–1923: different systems based on the former Austrian territories (Kingdom of Bohemia, Margraviate of Moravia, and Duchy of Upper and Lower Silesia) and former Hungarian counties in the north (later forming Slovakia (21 counties) and Subcarpathian Ruthenia (4 counties)) were reorganized into three provinces (Czech: země, Slovak: krajiny – literally "lands") of Bohemia-Moravia-Silesia, 21 counties (župy) of Slovakia, and 4 counties of Subcarpathian Ruthenia (today's Zakarpattia Oblast in Ukraine); all provinces and counties were further divided into districts (okresy)
- 1923–1927: like 1918–1923, except that the above counties were replaced by 6 (grand) counties ((veľ)župy) in Slovakia and 1 (grand) county in Subcarpathian Ruthenia, and the number and borders of districts were changed in these two territories
- 1928–1938: 4 provinces: Bohemia, Moravia-Silesia, Slovakia and Subcarpathian Ruthenia; divided into districts
- late 1938–March 1939: like 1928–1938, but Slovakia and Subcarpathian Ruthenia were promoted to "autonomous lands", while the border regions were ceded to Germany (so-called Sudetenland) and Hungary (southern parts of Slovakia and Subcarpathian Ruthenia)
- 1939–1945: Bohemia and Moravia became a protectorate of Germany, the remainder of Subcarpathian Ruthenia was annexed by Hungary, while Slovakia was nominally independent
- 1945–1948: like 1928–1938, except that Subcarpathian Ruthenia became part of the Soviet Union in 1945
- 1949–1960: 19 regions divided in 270 districts; Czech historical provinces/lands abolished
- 1960–1992: Ten regions plus Prague (and from 1970 also Bratislava), further divided into over 100 districts. Czech and Slovak Socialist Republics added as a layer above the regions at federalization in 1969.

== 1918-1948 division ==
From 1918 to 1928, eastern Czechoslovakia, within what is now the Czech Republic, was divided into three administrative divisions known as lands: Bohemian Land, Moravian Land, and Silesian Land. The territories of Slovakia and Subcarpathian Ruthenia were divided into several regions.

From 1928 to 1939, Czechoslovakia was divided into five lands: Bohemian Land, Moravian-Silesian Land (including the Silesian branch office in the Moravian-Silesian Land), Slovak Land, and the Subcarpathian Ruthenian Land.

== 1948–1960 division ==
The regions came into force on 24 December 1948. During this period, there were 19 total regions: 13 Czech and 6 Slovak as follows:

=== Czech regions ===
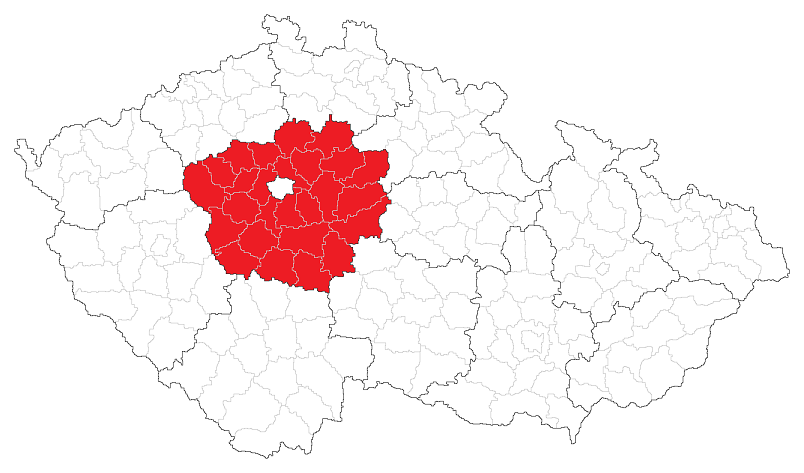
Map of the Czech regions of Czechoslovakia, highlighting the Prague Region

From 1954, the city of Prague was made into a city-region, separate from Prague Region.

- Brno Region
- České Budějovice Region
- Gottwaldov Region
- Hradec Králové Region
- Jihlava Region
- Karlovy Vary Region
- Liberec Region
- Olomouc Region
- Ostrava Region
- Pardubice Region
- Plzeň Region
- Prague Region
- Ústí nad Labem Region

=== Slovak regions ===
- Banská Bystrica Region
- Bratislava Region
- Košice Region
- Nitra Region
- Prešov Region
- Žilina Region

== Latest division (1960–1992) ==
The country consisted of 10 regions ('kraje'), Prague, and (from 1970) Bratislava; further divided in 109–114 districts ('okresy').

The kraje were abolished temporarily in Slovakia in 1969–1970 and from late 1990 in whole Czechoslovakia. In addition, the two republics Czech Socialist Republic and Slovak Socialist Republic were established in 1969 during the federalization process. The word Socialist was removed from the republics' names in 1990 after the Velvet Revolution.

Since many regions changed significantly after the Velvet Divorce of 1993, here is list of their original names and current regions they approximately correspond to:

=== Czech (Socialist) Republic ===
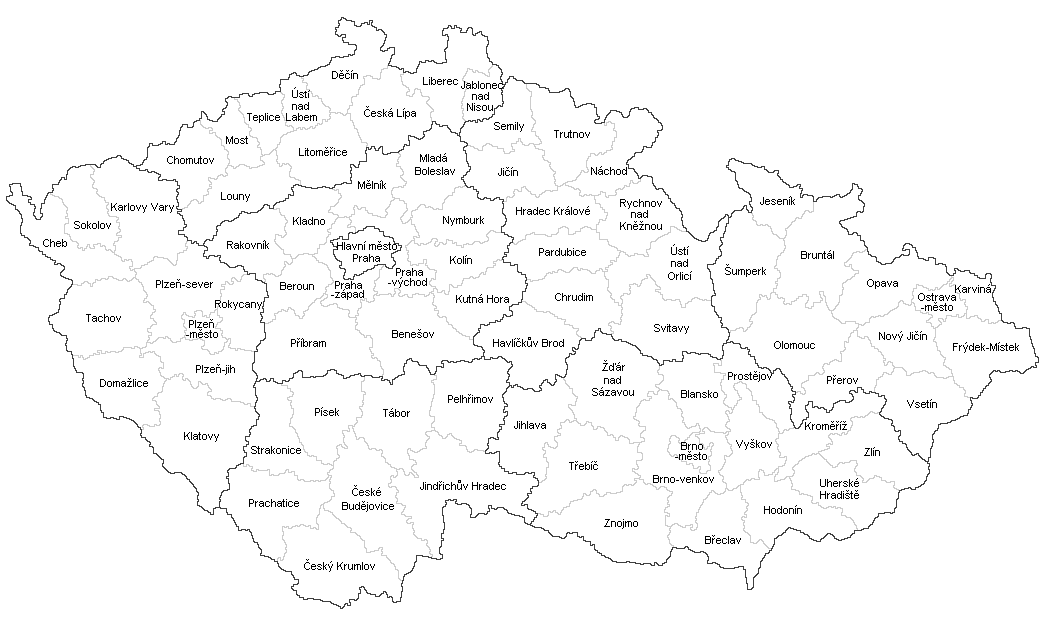
Czech regions in 1960–1993

- Praha: Prague
- Středočeský kraj: today Central Bohemian Region
- Jihočeský kraj: today South Bohemian Region
- Západočeský kraj (West Bohemian Region): today Plzeň Region and Karlovy Vary Region
- Severočeský kraj (North Bohemian Region): today Ústí nad Labem Region, and most of Liberec Region
- Východočeský kraj (East Bohemian Region): today Hradec Králové Region, Pardubice Region, and small parts of Liberec Region and Vysočina Region
- Jihomoravský kraj (South Moravian Region): today South Moravian Region, and most of Vysočina Region and Zlín Region
- Severomoravský kraj (North Moravian Region): today Moravian-Silesian Region, Olomouc Region, and part of Zlín Region

=== Slovak (Socialist) Republic ===
- Bratislava: today a part of the Bratislava Region
- cs:Západoslovenský kraj (West Slovak Region): Trnava Region, Nitra Region, most of Bratislava Region, and a small part of Trenčín Region
- cs:Stredoslovenský kraj (Central Slovak Region): today Žilina Region, Banská Bystrica Region, and a large part of Trenčín Region
- cs:Východoslovenský kraj (East Slovak Region): today Prešov Region and Košice Region

== See also ==
- Czech Republic#Administrative divisions
- Slovakia#Administrative divisions
