= Federated state =

Territorial and constitutional community forming part of a federal union

Federated states of various types exist within many of the modern federal states (represented in green).

A federated state (also known as state, province, region, canton, land, governorate, oblast, emirate, or country) is a territorial and constitutional community forming part of a federation. A federated state does not have international sovereignty since powers are divided between the other federated states and the federal government. Unlike international sovereign states, which have what is often referred to as Westphalian sovereignty (such as exercised by their federal government), federated states operate under their domestic or federal law with relation to the rest of the world.

Federated states do not have automatic standing as entities of international law. Instead, the federal union (federation) as a single entity is the sovereign state for purposes of international law. Depending on the constitutional structure of a particular federation, a federated state can hold various degrees of legislative, judicial, and administrative jurisdiction over a defined geographic territory and is a form of regional government. A federated state may nonetheless establish offices internationally, for example, to promote trade or tourism, while still operating only within the trade policy or other applicable law of their federation, and their host country. They also may enter into international regional agreements under the laws of their federation and state, such as to protect a cross-border resource like water or other shared matters.

In some cases, a federation is created from the union of political entities that are either independent or dependent territories of another sovereign entity (most commonly a colonial power). (Note: Examples are Australia, Canada and the United States.) In other cases, federated states have been created out of the administrative divisions of previously unitary states. (Note: This occurred in Belgium in 1993. The Belgian regions had previously devolved powers.) Once a federal constitution is formed, the rules governing the relationship between federal and regional powers become part of the country's constitutional law and not international law.

In countries with federal constitutions, there is a division of power between the central government and the component states. These entities – states, provinces, counties, cantons, Länder, etc. – are partially self-governing and are afforded a degree of constitutionally guaranteed autonomy that varies substantially from one federation to another. (Note: For instance, Canadian provinces and Swiss cantons possess substantially more powers and enjoy more protection against interference and infringements from the central government than most non-Western federations.) Depending on the form the decentralization of powers takes, a federated state's legislative powers may or may not be overruled or vetoed by the federal government. Whether federal preemption of may occur could depend on the power in issue. Laws governing the relationship between federal and regional powers can be amended through the national or federal constitution, and, if they exist, state constitutions as well.

In terms of internal politics, federated states can have republican or monarchical forms of government. Those of republican form (federated republics) are usually called states (like states of the US) or republics (like republics in the former USSR).

== List of constituents by federation ==
The federated units in the table below have inherent governmental authority in the federation's constitutional system, while the "other units" are delegated authority by the federal government or are administered directly by it.

Federation	Federated units	Other units
Argentina	23 provinces: Buenos Aires; Catamarca; Chaco; Chubut; Córdoba; Corrientes; Entre Ríos; Formosa; Jujuy; La Pampa; La Rioja; Mendoza; Misiones; Neuquén; Río Negro; Salta; San Juan; San Luis; Santa Cruz; Santa Fe; Santiago del Estero; Tierra del Fuego; Tucumán	1 autonomous city: Buenos Aires (Note: Federal capital district, region or territory.)
Australia	6 states: New South Wales; Queensland; South Australia; Tasmania; Victoria; Western Australia	3 internal territories: Australian Capital Territory; Jervis Bay Territory; Northern Territory
Australia	6 states: New South Wales; Queensland; South Australia; Tasmania; Victoria; Western Australia	7 external territories: Ashmore and Cartier Islands; Australian Antarctic Territory; Christmas Island; Cocos (Keeling) Islands; Coral Sea Islands Territory; Heard Island and McDonald Islands; Norfolk Island
Austria	9 states: Vienna; Lower Austria; Upper Austria; Styria; Tyrol; Carinthia; Salzburg; Vorarlberg; Burgenland	
Belgium	3 regions: (Note: Flanders and Wallonia are subdivided into five provinces each, which are mandated by the Constitution of Belgium. Provincial governance is the responsibility of the regional governments.): Flanders; Wallonia; Brussels	
Belgium	3 communities: (Note: The communities and regions of Belgium are separate government institutions with different areas of responsibility. The communities are organized based on linguistic boundaries, which are different from regional boundaries.): Flemish; French; German-speaking	
Bosnia and Herzegovina	2 entities: (Note: autonomous area): Republika Srpska; Federation of Bosnia and Herzegovina	1 self-governing district: Brčko (officially condominium of both constituents)
Bosnia and Herzegovina	The Federation of Bosnia and Herzegovina is itself a federation of 10 cantons: Una-Sana; Posavina; Tuzla; Zenica-Doboj; Bosnian-Podrinje; Central Bosnia; Herzegovina-Neretva; West Herzegovina; Sarajevo; Canton 10	1 self-governing district: Brčko (officially condominium of both constituents)
Brazil	26 states: Acre; Alagoas; Amapá; Amazonas; Bahia; Ceará; Espírito Santo; Goiás; Maranhão; Mato Grosso; Mato Grosso do Sul; Minas Gerais; Pará; Paraíba; Paraná; Pernambuco; Piauí; Rio de Janeiro; Rio Grande do Norte; Rio Grande do Sul; Rondônia; Roraima; Santa Catarina; São Paulo; Sergipe; Tocantins	
Brazil	1 federal district: Distrito Federal (Note: The Brazilian federal district has a level of self-ruling equal to the other main federal units.)	
Canada	10 provinces: Alberta; British Columbia; Manitoba; New Brunswick; Newfoundland and Labrador; Nova Scotia; Ontario; Prince Edward Island; Quebec; Saskatchewan	3 territories: Northwest Territories; Nunavut; Yukon
Ethiopia	12 regions: Afar; Amhara; Benishangul-Gumuz; Central Ethiopia; Gambela; Harari; Oromia; Sidama; Somali; South Ethiopia; South West Ethiopia; Tigray	2 chartered cities: Addis Ababa; Dire Dawa
Germany	16 states: Baden-Württemberg; Bavaria; Berlin; Brandenburg; Bremen; Hamburg; Hesse; Lower Saxony; Mecklenburg-Vorpommern; North Rhine-Westphalia; Rhineland-Palatinate; Saarland; Saxony; Saxony-Anhalt; Schleswig-Holstein; Thuringia	
India	28 states: Andhra Pradesh; Arunachal Pradesh; Assam; Bihar; Chhattisgarh; Goa; Gujarat; Haryana; Himachal Pradesh; Jharkhand; Karnataka; Kerala; Madhya Pradesh; Maharashtra; Manipur; Meghalaya; Mizoram; Nagaland; Odisha; Punjab; Rajasthan; Sikkim; Tamil Nadu; Telangana; Tripura; Uttar Pradesh; Uttarakhand; West Bengal	8 union territories: Andaman and Nicobar Islands; Chandigarh; Dadra and Nagar Haveli and Daman and Diu; National Capital Territory of Delhi; Jammu and Kashmir (Note: Sovereignty over territory actively disputed by another sovereign state or the international community.); Ladakh; Lakshadweep; Puducherry
Iraq	1 federal region: Kurdistan Region (Note: Has the authority to manage its internal affairs, provided it does not conflict with the provisions of the constitution of Iraq and/or the exclusive jurisdiction of the federal government.) (overlaps the area of Duhok, Erbil, Halabja and Sulaymaniyah governorates)	19 governorates: Al Anbar; Erbil; Babylon; Baghdad; Basra; Dhi Qar; Diyala; Duhok; Halabja; Karbala; Kirkuk; Maysan; Muthanna; Najaf; Nineveh; Al-Qādisiyyah; Saladin; Sulaymaniyah; Wasit
Malaysia	13 states: Johor; Kedah; Kelantan; Malacca; Negeri Sembilan; Pahang; Penang; Perak; Perlis; Sabah; Sarawak; Selangor; Terengganu	3 federal territories: Putrajaya; Kuala Lumpur; Labuan
Mexico	31 states: Aguascalientes; Baja California; Baja California Sur; Campeche; Chiapas; Chihuahua; Coahuila; Colima; Durango; Guanajuato; Guerrero; Hidalgo; Jalisco; State of Mexico; Michoacán; Morelos; Nayarit; Nuevo León; Oaxaca; Puebla; Querétaro; Quintana Roo; San Luis Potosí; Sinaloa; Sonora; Tabasco; Tamaulipas; Tlaxcala; Veracruz; Yucatán; Zacatecas	
Mexico	1 autonomous city: Mexico City	
Micronesia	4 states: Chuuk; Kosrae; Pohnpei; Yap	
Nepal	7 provinces: Bagmati; Gandaki; Karnali; Koshi; Lumbini; Madhesh; Sudurpashchim	
Nigeria	36 states: Abia; Adamawa; Akwa Ibom; Anambra; Bauchi; Bayelsa; Benue; Borno; Cross River; Delta; Ebonyi; Edo; Ekiti; Enugu; Gombe; Imo; Jigawa; Kaduna; Kano; Katsina; Kebbi; Kogi; Kwara; Lagos; Nasarawa; Niger; Ogun; Ondo; Osun; Oyo; Plateau; Rivers; Sokoto; Taraba; Yobe; Zamfara	1 territory: Federal Capital Territory
Pakistan	4 provinces: Balochistan; Khyber Pakhtunkhwa; Punjab; Sindh	2 autonomous territories: Azad Jammu and Kashmir; Gilgit-Baltistan
Pakistan	4 provinces: Balochistan; Khyber Pakhtunkhwa; Punjab; Sindh	1 federal territory: Islamabad Capital Territory
Russia	48 oblasts: Amur; Arkhangelsk; Astrakhan; Belgorod; Bryansk; Chelyabinsk; Irkutsk; Ivanovo; Kaliningrad; Kaluga; Kemerovo; Kirov; Kherson (Note: Partially annexed by Russia in 2022 during Russo-Ukrainian war, considered to be part of Ukraine.); Kostroma; Kurgan; Kursk; Leningrad; Lipetsk; Magadan; Moscow Oblast; Murmansk; Nizhny Novgorod; Novgorod; Novosibirsk; Omsk; Orenburg; Oryol; Penza; Pskov; Rostov; Ryazan; Sakhalin; Samara; Saratov; Smolensk; Sverdlovsk; Tambov; Tomsk; Tver; Tula; Tyumen; Ulyanovsk; Vladimir; Volgograd; Vologda; Voronezh; Yaroslavl; Zaporozhye	
Russia	24 republics: Adygea; Altai Republic; Bashkortostan; Buryatia; Chechnya; Chuvashia; Crimea (Note: Claimed by Ukraine and considered by most of the international community to be part of Ukraine.); Dagestan; Donetsk; Ingushetia; Kabardino-Balkaria; Kalmykia; Karachay-Cherkessia; Karelia; Khakassia; Komi; Luhansk; Mari El; Mordovia; North Ossetia-Alania; Sakha; Tatarstan; Tuva; Udmurtia	
Russia	9 krais: Altai Krai; Kamchatka; Khabarovsk; Krasnodar; Krasnoyarsk; Perm; Primorsky; Stavropol; Zabaykalsky	
Russia	4 autonomous okrugs: Chukotka; Khanty–Mansi; Nenets; Yamalo-Nenets	
Russia	3 federal cities: Moscow; Saint Petersburg; Sevastopol	
Russia	1 autonomous oblast: Jewish Autonomous Oblast	
Saint Kitts and Nevis	1 autonomous island: Nevis	Saint Kitts: Saint Kitts
Somalia	7 federal member states: (Note: Adopted constitution accommodates existing regional governments, with the ultimate number and boundaries of the Federal Member States to be determined by the House of the People of the Federal Parliament.): Galmudug; Hirshabelle; Jubaland; North East; Puntland; Somaliland (Note: Partially recognized by one UN member state. Claimed by Somalia and considered by most of the international community to be part of Somalia.); South West	
South Sudan	10 states: Central Equatoria; Eastern Equatoria; Jonglei; Lakes; Northern Bahr el Ghazal; Unity; Upper Nile; Warrap; Western Bahr el Ghazal; Western Equatoria	3 administrative areas: Abyei; Greater Pibor; Ruweng
Sudan	18 states: Blue Nile; Central Darfur; East Darfur; Gezira; Kassala; Khartoum; North Darfur; North Kordofan; Northern; Al Qadarif; Red Sea; Sennar; South Darfur; South Kordofan; River Nile; West Darfur; West Kordofan; White Nile	1 special administrative status area: Abyei
Switzerland	26 cantons: Aargau; Appenzell Ausserrhoden; Appenzell Innerrhoden; Basel-Landschaft; Basel-Stadt; Bern; Fribourg; Geneva; Glarus; Grisons; Jura; Lucerne; Neuchâtel; Nidwalden; Obwalden; Schaffhausen; Schwyz; Solothurn; St. Gallen; Thurgau; Ticino; Uri; Valais; Vaud; Zug; Zürich	
United Arab Emirates	7 emirates: Abu Dhabi; Ajman; Dubai; Fujairah; Ras Al Khaimah; Sharjah; Umm al-Quwain	
United States	50 states: Alabama; Alaska; Arizona; Arkansas; California; Colorado; Connecticut; Delaware; Florida; Georgia; Hawaii; Idaho; Illinois; Indiana; Iowa; Kansas; Kentucky; Louisiana; Maine; Maryland; Massachusetts; Michigan; Minnesota; Mississippi; Missouri; Montana; Nebraska; Nevada; New Hampshire; New Jersey; New Mexico; New York; North Carolina; North Dakota; Ohio; Oklahoma; Oregon; Pennsylvania; Rhode Island; South Carolina; South Dakota; Tennessee; Texas; Utah; Vermont; Virginia; Washington; West Virginia; Wisconsin; Wyoming	1 federal district: District of Columbia
United States		1 incorporated territory: Palmyra Atoll
United States		13 unincorporated territories: American Samoa; Guam; Northern Mariana Islands; Puerto Rico; U.S. Virgin Islands; Minor outlying islands: Baker Island; Howland Island; Jarvis Island; Johnston Atoll; Kingman Reef; Midway Atoll; Navassa Island; Wake Island; Bajo Nuevo Bank; Serranilla Bank
Venezuela	23 states: Amazonas; Anzoátegui; Apure; Aragua; Barinas; Bolívar; Carabobo; Cojedes; Delta Amacuro; Falcón; Guárico; Lara; Mérida; Miranda; Monagas; Nueva Esparta; Portuguesa; Sucre; Táchira; Trujillo; Vargas; Yaracuy; Zulia	1 capital district: (Caracas) Distrito Capital
Venezuela	23 states: Amazonas; Anzoátegui; Apure; Aragua; Barinas; Bolívar; Carabobo; Cojedes; Delta Amacuro; Falcón; Guárico; Lara; Mérida; Miranda; Monagas; Nueva Esparta; Portuguesa; Sucre; Táchira; Trujillo; Vargas; Yaracuy; Zulia	1 federal dependency: Federal Dependencies of Venezuela

== See also ==
- Associated state
- Constituent country
- Federal district
- Federal territory
- Federation
- List of countries by federal system
- List of administrative divisions by country
- List of autonomous areas by country
- List of sovereign states
- Supranational union
