= Siege of Parenda (1634) =

1634 siege between the Mughal Empire and Bijapur Sultanate

Date	24 February – May 1634
Location	Paranda Fort, Western Deccan (present-day Maharashtra, India)
Result	Bijapur–Ahmadnagar victory

Belligerents
Mughal Empire	Bijapur Sultanate; Ahmadnagar Sultanate

Commanders and leaders
Shah Shuja; Mahabat Khan; Khan Zaman; Jai Singh I	Murari Pandit; Randaula Khan; Shahaji

The Siege of Parenda (1634) was a 17th-century military conflict between the Mughal Empire and the Sultanate of Bijapur over Paranda Fort, wherein Mughal forces besieged the Adil Shahi fort for four months. The siege took place during the reigns of Mughal emperor Shah Jahan and Mohammed Adil Shah of Bijapur. It was the second Mughal siege of the fort following a failed attempt in 1631, and was part of a string of Mughal military campaigns in the Deccan Plateau. The siege was led by Mughal general Mahabat Khan, governor of the Deccan, though the young prince Shah Shuja was its nominal commander. The siege lasted four months and was unsuccessful, with the fort remaining in Adil Shahi control.

== Background ==
The siege of Paranda occurred at a time when the Mughals under emperor Shah Jahan had been steadily attacking forts in the territory of the Ahmadnagar Sultanate, of which the sieges of Kandhar Fort, Dharur, and Daulatabad are examples. At this time, Muhammad Adil Shah ruled over the Bijapur Sultanate. The fort of Paranda had been under the control of the Ahmadnagar Sultanate, until a governor sold the fort to the Adil Shahi sultan. In 1631, the Mughals had tried to besiege the fort under the command of Azam Khan, but this endeavor failed due to a lack of adequate resources for supporting the imperial army. The viceroy of the Deccan Mahabat Khan thereafter advised the young Mughal prince Shah Shuja to consider another offensive against the fort of Parenda, as a means to consolidating authority over the outer territories of the Ahmadnagar Sultanate; the sultanate had just been symbolically defeated with Mahabat Khan's successful siege of Daulatabad (1633). Another provided justification was that Parenda could serve as a military base to campaign against the Bijapur Sultanate; the fort had great strategic importance as there was no other fortified position between Parenda and the Sultanate's capital city of Bijapur.

Mahabat Khan deputed expeditions led by his son Khan Zaman in the frontier of the Bijapur Sultanate. The latter also worked to establish military outposts spanning the line between Daulatabad and Parenda, so as to block off any Maratha forces. However, Shahaji Bhonsle raised a puppet ruler to the Nizam Shahi throne and harassed the Mughal forces, which eased the pressure on Parenda and required that a Mughal force be deputed to deal with Shahji. This thwarted Khan Zaman's attempt to capture Parenda.

== Siege ==
In response to Khan Zaman's failed attempt, Mahabat Khan himself and prince Shah Shuja left the Mughal base at Malkapur, and marched to Parenda with a large army to besiege the fort personally, dating to 24 February 1634. Shah Shuja was the nominal commander of the army, with Mahabat Khan his right-hand man. Rajput noble Jai Singh I acted as the force's vanguard, arriving in the vicinity of Parenda in January. He later led a night surprise attack on the enemy's baggage camp on the 14th of March. Due to the lingering effects of the Deccan famine of 1630–1632, resources to support the imperial army such as grass and firewood were scarce in the area, which posed a challenge to the Mughal forces; foraging expeditions had to be sent to distant areas where they were more vulnerable to attacks. Mahabat Khan himself was nearly captured on one such expedition, before being rescued by Nasiri Khan. The Adil Shahi commanders Murari Pandit and Randaula Khan with Nizam Shahi commander Shahaji supported the fort with an armed force, which deterred Mughal efforts. The imperial army was also poorly organised, and Shah Shuja was not able to effectively control his generals. In light of the fact that seasonal rains were due, Mahabat Khan advised Shah Shuja to retreat to Burhanpur; the siege was lifted in May of the same year, having lasted four months.

The siege of Parenda was closely monitored by the Portuguese State of India, likely due to the strategic importance of the fort.

== Aftermath ==
According to scholar Douglas Streusand, the failed siege had an adverse impact on the area surrounding the fort; approximately 1,256 square miles were depleted of food, and 5,017 square miles were depleted of fodder. Parenda Fort remained in Bijapur's hands and fell to Mughal control much later, only through bribery during the reign of Mughal emperor Aurangzeb. Disappointed by the failure of the siege, Shah Jahan recalled Shah Shuja and Khan Zaman to the imperial court, and reprimanded Mahabat Khan; Mahabat Khan died shortly after in October 1634 from natural causes. Some court chronicles of Shah Jahan's reign, though not all, omit mention of the Parenda siege, indicating that Shah Jahan wished to overlook this military failure.
