= Bhojuchiwadi =

Village in Maharashtra

Bhojuchiwadi is a village situated 14 km from Kandhar, Maharashtra.

The village has a population of more than 500 people. More than half have migrated from Bhojuchiwadi to cities for their work and lives.
