= Randaula Khan =

Indo-African army officer and viceroy

Khan-i-Zaman Rustam-i-Zaman Randaula Khan
- Monarch: Mohammed Adil Shah

Personal details
- Died: 1643
- Resting place: Mausoleum of Randaula Khan, Rahimatpur
- Relations: Khairiyat Khan (uncle)
- Children: Rustam Zaman
- Parent: Farhad Khan (father)

Military service
- Battles/wars: Mughal–Bijapur Wars: Siege of Daulatabad; Siege of Parenda; Battle of Bhatvadi

Randaula Khan, also spelt Ranadulla Khan (died 1643), was a leading Indo-African general and viceroy of the Bijapur Sultanate during the 17th century. He governed the southwestern region of the Sultanate from his administrative seat at Mirjan. He was a key player in the Sultanate's politics, particularly during Mughal-Bijapur conflicts in the early 17th century. He is remembered for leading conquests that expanded Bijapur southwards into the Karnataka region in the mid-17th century.

== Origins ==
Randaula Khan was the son of Farhad Khan and nephew to Khairiyat Khan, both leading African nobles of the Bijapur Sultanate.

== Career ==
Randaula Khan governed the southwestern region of the Bijapur Sultanate as his family's hereditary fief, namely the southern Konkan region and Kanara. His administration extended from Ratnagiri in the west, southwards around Portuguese Goa to Karwar and Mirjan. Mirjan was Randaula Khan's seat of administration. Karwar, Rajapur, and Mirjan were prosperous ports under his control, and his territory was famous for trade in pepper, silk, betelnut, and saltpeter. Scholar Subah Dayal writes that Randaula Khan and his kin held a monopoly over gun trade around the area of Rajapur. A farman (imperial decree) from 1641 also indicates that Randaula Khan operated trade ships that travelled between the ports of Chaul and Dabhol.

=== Court politics and Mughal imperialism ===
Randaula Khan played a key role in court politics in the years after Mohammad Adil Shah ascended Bijapur's throne in 1627. The accession caused factionalism, in which the nobles Khawas Khan and Mustafa Khan emerged as rivals. The two mainly differed in their foreign policy; Mustafa Khan had sympathies for the Mughal Empire that had been actively reducing the Nizam Shahi kingdom under the rule of Mughal emperor Shah Jahan, while Khawas Khan and his faction were anti-Mughal, fearing that Mughal imperialism would soon take over Bijapur itself if encouraged. Randaula Khan was a follower of Mustafa Khan, and while Mohammad Adil Shah initially carried out an alliance with the Mughals over the Nizam Shahis demise, the Mughals soon upset Bijapur by taking control of Dharpur, which caused the sultan to switch to an anti-Mughal policy and ally with the Nizam Shahis to combat the Mughals. Around 1633, Randaula Khan was able to convince Fath Khan, ruler of the Nizam Shahi Sultanate, to oppose the Mughals; this led to the Siege of Daulatabad (1633). Randaula Khan participated in this siege alongside Shahji Bhonsle, disrupting Mughal efforts to capture the Nizam Shahi fort of Daulatabad by leading skirmishes upon the Mughal forces, disrupting communication lines, and smuggling supplies to aid the fort's garrison. These efforts failed and the Mughals won the fort, which led to the extinction of the Nizam Shahi kingdom. Randaula Khan was also deputed to aid Shahji in attacking the Mughals' conquests in the former Nizam Shahi kingdom, in order to distract the Mughals from the Siege of Parenda (1634). Military pressure from Shah Jahan led to Bijapur deserting its policy of harassing the Mughals around 1635, and Shahji was abandoned in his exploits. Randaula Khan was deputed to ally with the Mughals in stopping Shahji; him and Mughal general Khan Zaman besieged Shahji at the fort of Mahuli, where Shahji surrendered and entered Bijapur's service.

Around this time, factionalism in the court of Bijapur grew, and Randaula Khan led the charge in carrying out the assassination of Khawas Khan, leading to Mustafa Khan becoming the leading noble. In 1636, Bijapur accepted a deed of submission with the Mughals after further military pressure from the latter; this secured peace with the Mughal Empire, and allowed Bijapur to retain political independence for the near future.

=== Southwards expansion ===
In 1638, Randaula Khan was made commander-in-chief of the Bijapur armies deputed by Mohammad Adil Shah to undertake expeditions in the south. He was entitled 'Khan-i-Zaman', and was also known by the title 'Rustam-i-Zaman'. He was assisted by another influential African of Bijapur, Siddi Reihan, in his exploits. His initial expedition involved conquering Ikkeri and Bednur from Virabhadra Nayaka. Subsequently, he turned eastwards on the sultan's orders and advanced on Adoni and Tarpatri - however, he was dissuaded by local ruler Keng Nayak, who convinced him that the town of Bangalore would be a more lucrative target. Keng Nayak asked for the principality of Sera, ruled by Kasturi Rangappa Nayaka, in return; Randaula Khan deputed Afzal Khan who conquered its fort. This was handed over to Keng Nayak. Randaula Khan headed towards Bangalore and conquered the town from its ruler Kempe Gowda in three days. Randaula Khan instated Shahji Bhonsle as the governor of the conquered territory.

Randaula Khan then headed southwards with Shahji and led a campaign against Kantiraya Narasa Raja, ruler of Mysore. After pressuring the ruler with a month-long siege, the latter submitted and offered tribute to Randaula Khan in return for keeping the fort of Mysore. Subsequent to this victory however, former Bijapur vassal Keng Nayak deserted and fortified himself in Basavapattan. Randaula Khan pursued the latter, defeated him, arrested him, and shortly after killed him; this encouraged several local nayaks (chieftains) of Karnataka to submit to Bijapur's authority. Randaula Khan subsequently brought a number of local rajas (chieftains) under Bijapur's control through the armed assault of Afzal Khan, conquering Chiknayakanhalli, Belur, Tumkur, Belapur, and Kunigal. Following these victories, Randaula Khan returned to Bijapur.

In 1643, armed expedition into the south was renewed and Randaula Khan successfully besieged the fort of Tikri. He then returned to Bijapur again, and died the same year. He is buried in a mausoleum in Rahimatpur. Randaula Khan's military exploits were part of the Bijapur Sultanate's expansion into the region of Karnataka in the period 1637–1645, wherein former territories and successor states of the Vijayanagara Empire fell under Bijapur's control. Randaula Khan was the leading example of successful generals involved in this effort.

== In popular culture ==
=== Films and television ===
- In the 2026 Indian Marathi-language historical film Raja Shivaji, he is portrayed by Mir Sarwar.
