= Kandhar =

- Town
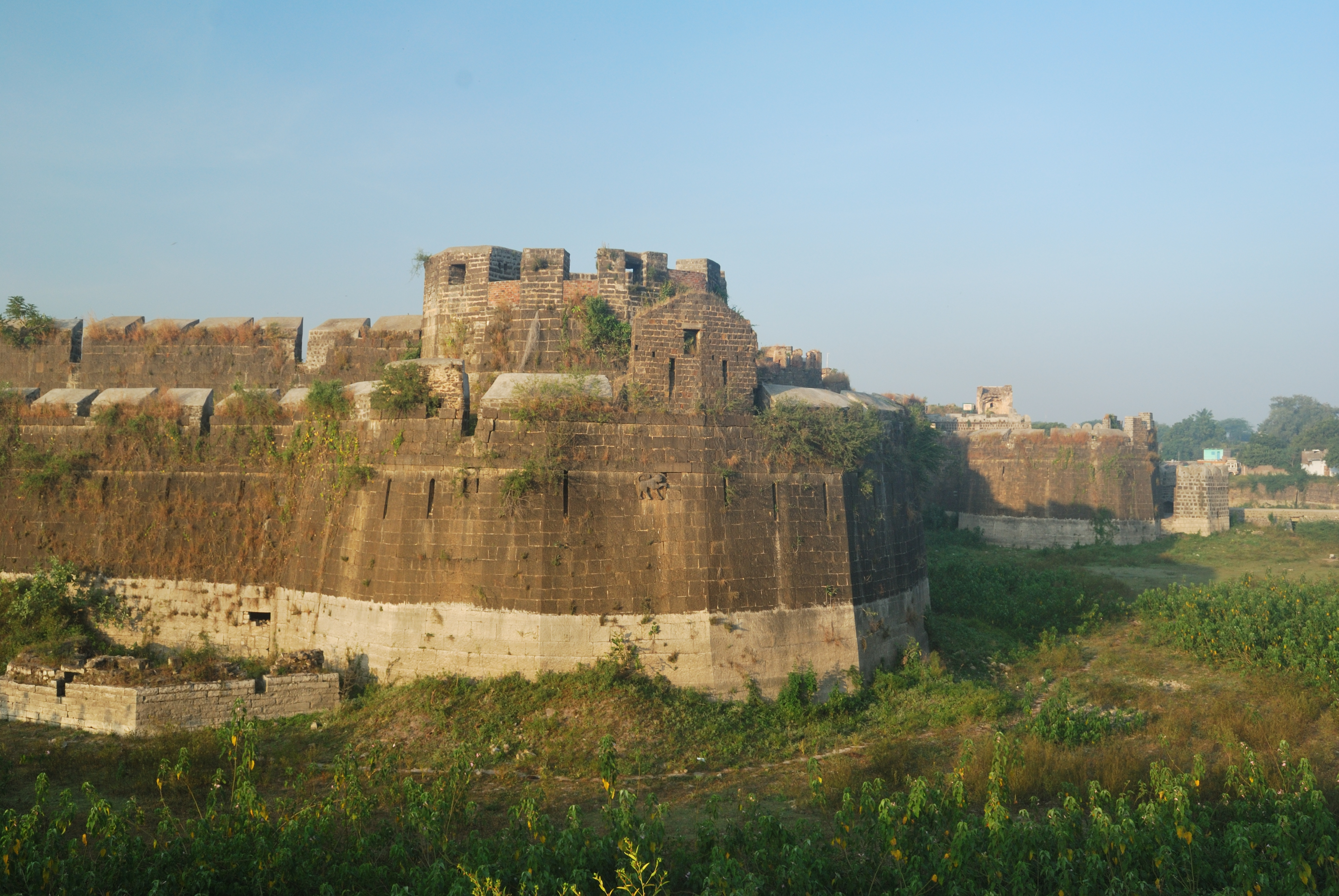
- Kandhar Fort

- Location in Maharashtra, India
- Coordinates: 18.9005°N 77.2014°E
- Country: India
- State: Maharashtra
- District: Nanded

Population (2011)
  - Total: 24,843
- Demonym: Kandharkar

Languages
  - Official: Marathi
- Time zone: UTC+5:30 (IST)
- Postal code: 431714
- Vehicle registration: MH 26

Kandhar is a town and a municipal council in Nanded district in the Indian state of Maharashtra. It lies near the western shore of Manyad Reservoir. Kandhar was famous as a major Jain centre in the Rashtrakuta kingdom, having Malkhed or Manyakheta as its capital. A huge statue of Kshetrapala (deity related to Jains) is found near the bhuikot; the statue is broken but from the toenail that survives, its height is estimated to be more than 50 feet. Presently, there is an old Digambar Jain Temple in Kandhar which is awaiting for its renovation. Kandhar is also famous for Kandhar Fort.

== History ==
In 1649, Shah Jahan aimed to recapture Kandhar and sent Aurangzeb with 60,000 cavalry and 10,000 infantry. The resultant Siege of Kandhar lasted for three months and 20 days.

According to local historical accounts, the fort derives its name from Kandahar, Afghanistan. It is said to have been rebuilt by the third forefather of the Durrani brothers of Deoni after they settled in the region following their victory in the Third Battle of Panipat. The Durrani family is also associated with the nearby area of Deoni, who also originated the Deoni cattle

== Demographics ==
As of 2011 India census, Kandhar had a population of 24,843. Males constitute 53% of the population and females 47%. Kandhar has an average literacy rate of 78%, higher than the national average of 75%: male literacy is 73%, and female literacy is 56%. In Kandhar, 15% of the population is under 6 years of age. It is also famous for the fort named Bhuikot, which is situated in Bahadarpura 3 km away from Kandhar. Kandhar is a historical city. Kandhar is also famous for custard apples.

Religions in Kandhar
Religion	Percent
Hindus	53%
Muslims	32%
Buddhists	10.6%
Jains	3.7%
Christians	0.4%
Others†	0.3%
Distribution of religions †Includes Sikhs (0.2%), Buddhists (<0.2%).

== See also ==
- Kandhar Fort
