= Siege of Nagpur =

1637 historical event

Date	16 January 1637
Location	Nagpur
Result	Mughal victory

Belligerents
Kingdom of Deogarh	Mughal Empire

Commanders and leaders
Kok Shah	Khan-i-Dauran; Jai Singh; Krishna Shah of Chanda; Sipahdar Khan

The siege of Nagpur was laid by Khan-i-Dauran, a high-ranking Mughal official to the fort of Nagpur, ruled by the Gond king of Deogarh, Kok Shah.

== Background ==
In January 1637, Khan-i-Dauran, a sardar of the Mughal emperor Shah Jahan was dispatched to demand payment of tribute from Kok Shah, who had defaulted on the annual payment of tribute to the Mughals. One of the reasons could also be that Jhujhar Singh, the rebellious raja of Orchha was allowed to pass through Deogarh territory unharmed. They were joined by Krishna Shah of Chanda, who had an enmity with the Deogarh kings since the reign of Jatba.

== Conflict ==
Khan-i-Dauran headed towards the frontiers of Deogarh and captured the forts of Udgir and Ausa in 1636. Then he went to meet the Emperor Shah Jahan and presented him with the captured loot. He was ordered to attack Kok Shah of Deogarh. He marched into the Gond country by crossing the river Wardha. First he seized the fortresses of Ashti and Kutaljhar (Keljhar) from Gond sardars, and then besieged Nagpur, a stronghold of Kok Shah. He was assisted by Jai Singh and Sipahdar Khan. Krishna Shah of Chanda joined him and also paid him rupees 70000. Khan Dauran sent his vakil (lawyer) Kanak Singh to Deogarh and demanded Kok Shah to surrender and pay tribute. Kok Shah delayed, thinking his Nagpur fort was strong enough to be impregnable, showing no regard for Khan-i-Dauran's proposal.

Three teams of sappers from Khan Dauran, Jai Singh and Sipahdar Khan were employed to prepare three mines under the walls of the fort. Darvesh Pahalwan was given the task of filling the moat around the fort which was about 20 feet wide. Three mines were fired. Jai Singh's mine could not bring down bastion but other two mines destroyed two bastions and parts of the wall. Jai Singh, Sipahdar Khan and Darvesh Pahalwan led the charge and entered the fort. The assault was successful and the kiladar (castellan) Deoji was taken prisoner.

== Peace and aftermath ==
Kok Shah now arrived from his capital at Deogarh and submitted to Khan Dauran on 16 January 1637. He made peace by presenting one and a half lakhs of rupees in cash and 170 elephants. The annual tribute was fixed (increased?) one and one third lakhs of rupees. He accepted the suzerainty of the Mughals and Nagpur was restored to him. This is the first invasion of Nagpur recorded in detail. The victorious Khan-i-Dauran returned to the Emperor, with 8 lakhs of rupees levied from the Gond chiefs and others, and was extolled and given the high title of Nusrat Jang or "Victorious in War".
