= Paranda Fort =

15th-century Indian fort

- Osmanabad District, Maharashtra, India
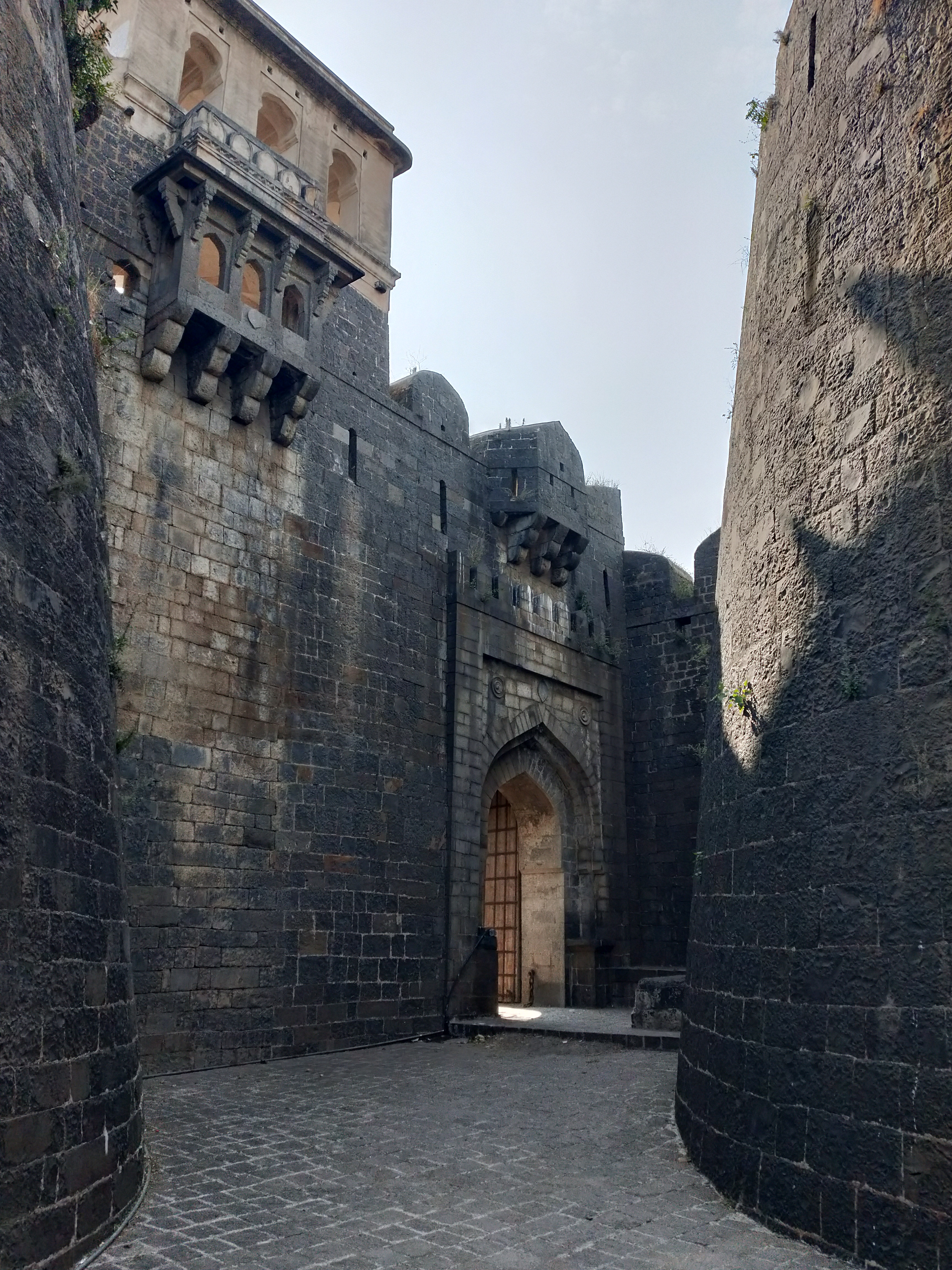

Site information
- Type: Land fort
- Owner: Archaeological Survey Of India, Government of India
- Controlled by: Ahmadnagar Sultanate
- Open to the public: Yes
- Condition: Good

Site history
- Built: 15ᵗʰ Century
- Built by: Maratha king jadhavrao Maratha jadhavrao
- In use: Last capital of Ahmednagar Sultanate
- Materials: Basalt, Granite, Lime mortar
- Battles/wars: Siege of Parenda (1634)

Paranda Fort is situated in Paranda, a small town in the Osmanabad district in the state of Maharashtra, India. It is protected monument by the Archaeological Survey Of India. The fort may have been constructed in the 15th century by Mahmud Gawan or by Murtaza Nizam Shah II in the early 1600s. Paranda has great historical value and finde mention in Honnati inscription of Baka 1045 (A.D. 1924) and also later a few of the Kalyan Chalukyan an copper plates. As well as in Yadava epigraphs, as Pallyanda Pratyandaka. The fort is attraction in this Paranda town and is known to have been built by Mahmud Gawan, the Peshwa (Prime Minister) of Muhammad Shah III Lashkari.

Paranda fort is a solid construction of medieval age. Its rampart walls being double-fortified by 26 strong rounded bastions, one of which tank the main entrance on the northern side. Further it has a protective moat or khandak around connected with the fort by a wooden draw bridge Some of the bastions in strategic places are mounted with huge cannons which can aver be seen today. These were mostly cast by Dutch craftsmen and one of them bears the name Husain Arabs, an Arab engineer in the service of the Bijapur. In one of the store rooms there are a few more cannons of which one is quite huge and an which is inscribed "Sarkar Nabab Mir Nizam All Khan Nearly 300 round shot are found. The round shot a.k.a cannon ball are still kept in the fort today.

Paranda fort is now a state protected monument under the Maharashtra Ancient Monuments and Archaeological Sites & Remains Act. 1960.

== History ==
The earliest mention of the fort is found during the reign of Mahmud Shah Bahmani, when its command was given to a nobleman titled Khan Jahan. In the Imperial Gazetteer, its construction is attributed to Mahmud Gawan, although contemporary sources do not mention this. The fort remained in the territory of the Bahmani Sultanate, and later their successor state, the Ahmadnagar Sultanate, ruled by the Nizam Shahi dynasty. During this period, it was on the border between three rival states—the Nizam Shahi, Adil Shahi, and Qutb Shahi sultanates, and as such, was the scene of constant skirmishes.

After the capital of Ahmadnagar was conquered by the Mughal Empire, Paranda became the seat of the Nizam Shahi, and remained so almost until the end of the dynasty. It was sold by its governor to the Adil Shahi for a sum of 300,000 huns.

The fort was unsuccessfully besieged twice by the Mughals during the reign of Shah Jahan. The first took place around 1631, commanded by Azam Khan, while the second took place in 1634 led by Mahabat Khan. During the reign of Aurangzeb, the fort was annexed into the Mughal territory without a fight, as it was ceded by the Adil Shahi governor Ghalib. In return, Ghalib was awarded a large sum of money, valuable presents, and a high position in the Mughal army. Under the Mughals, Paranda was a mint town.

== Cannons at the fort ==
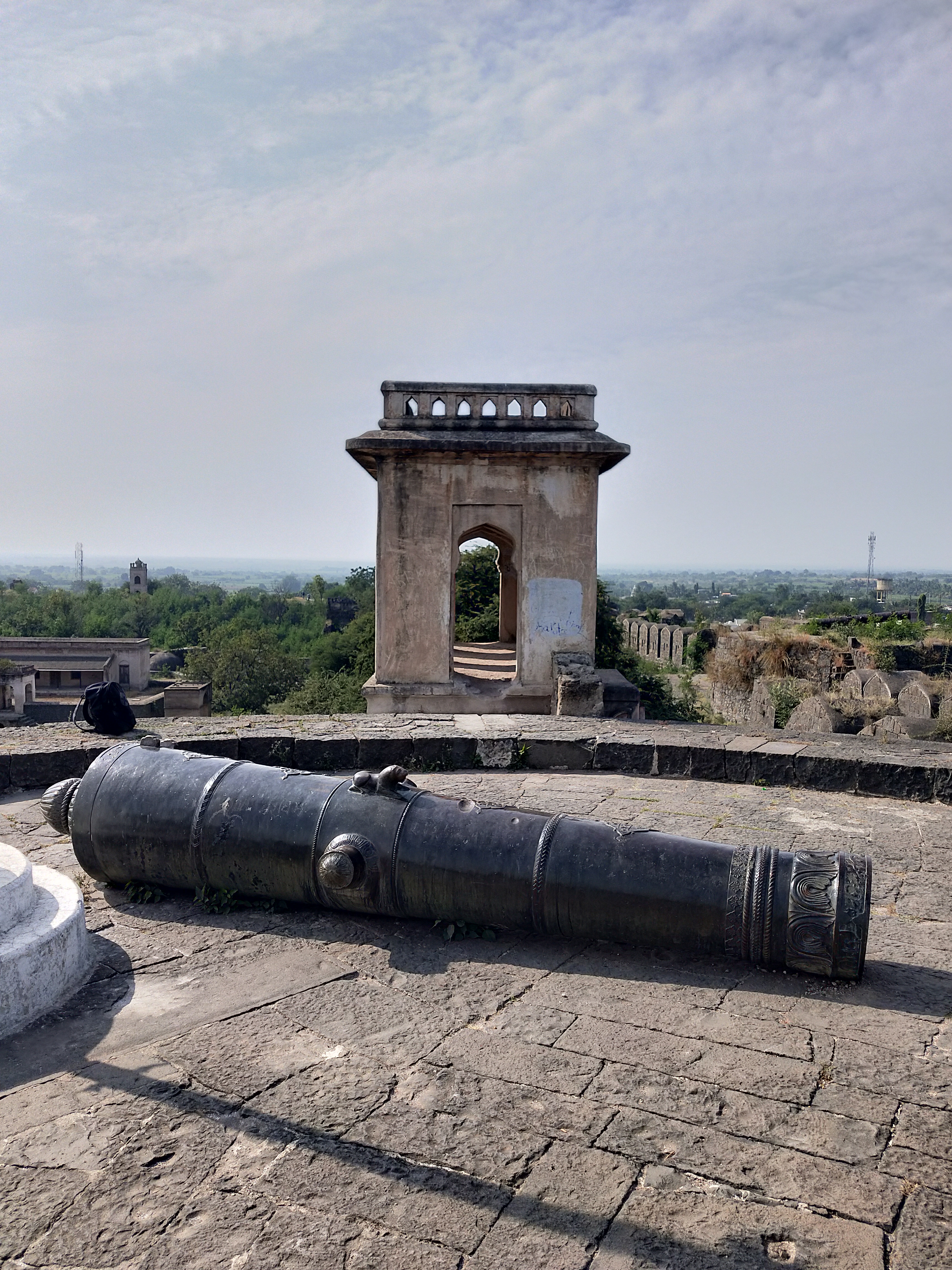
Mulukh-e-maidan

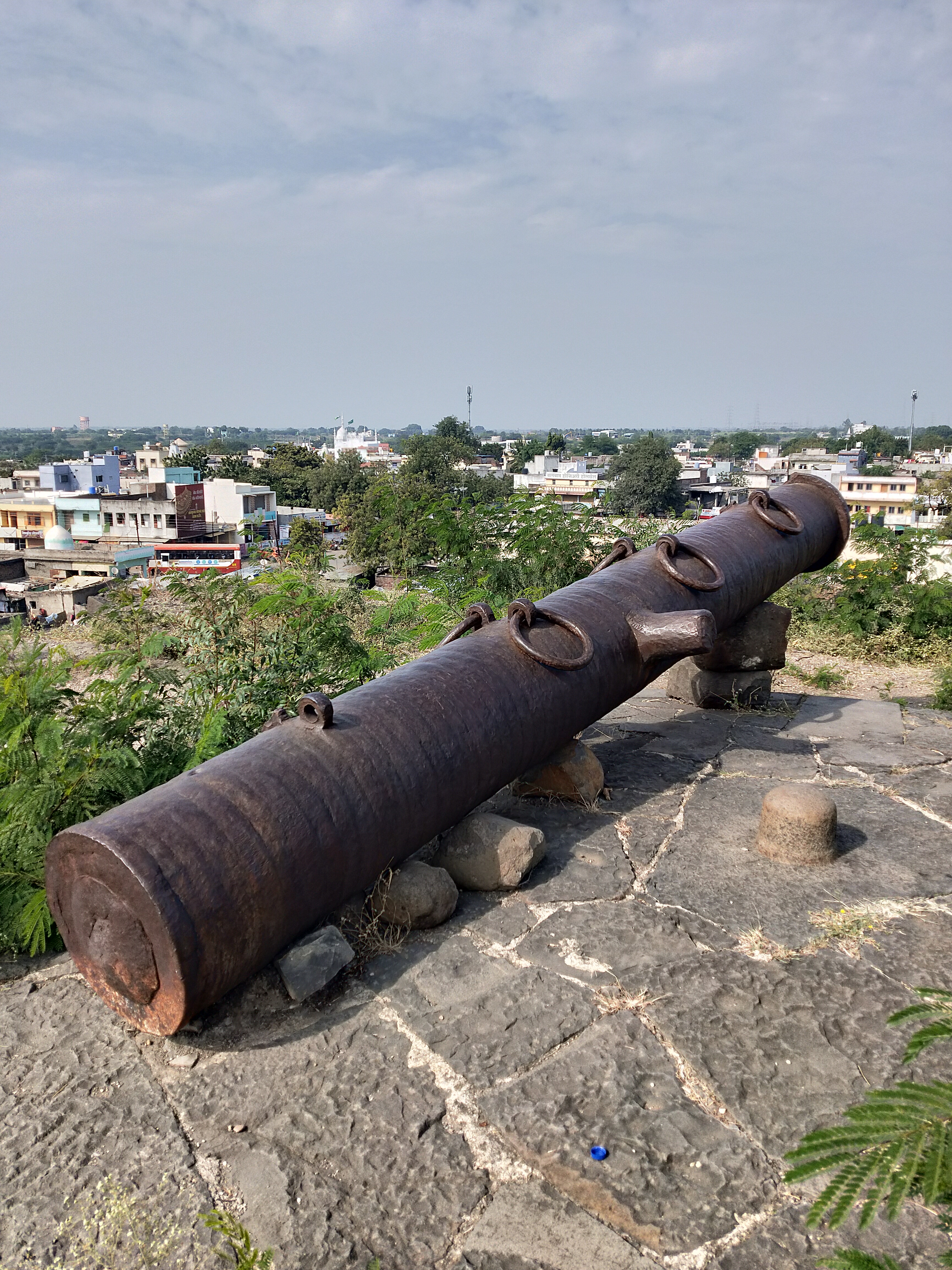
Kalal bangdi cannon I

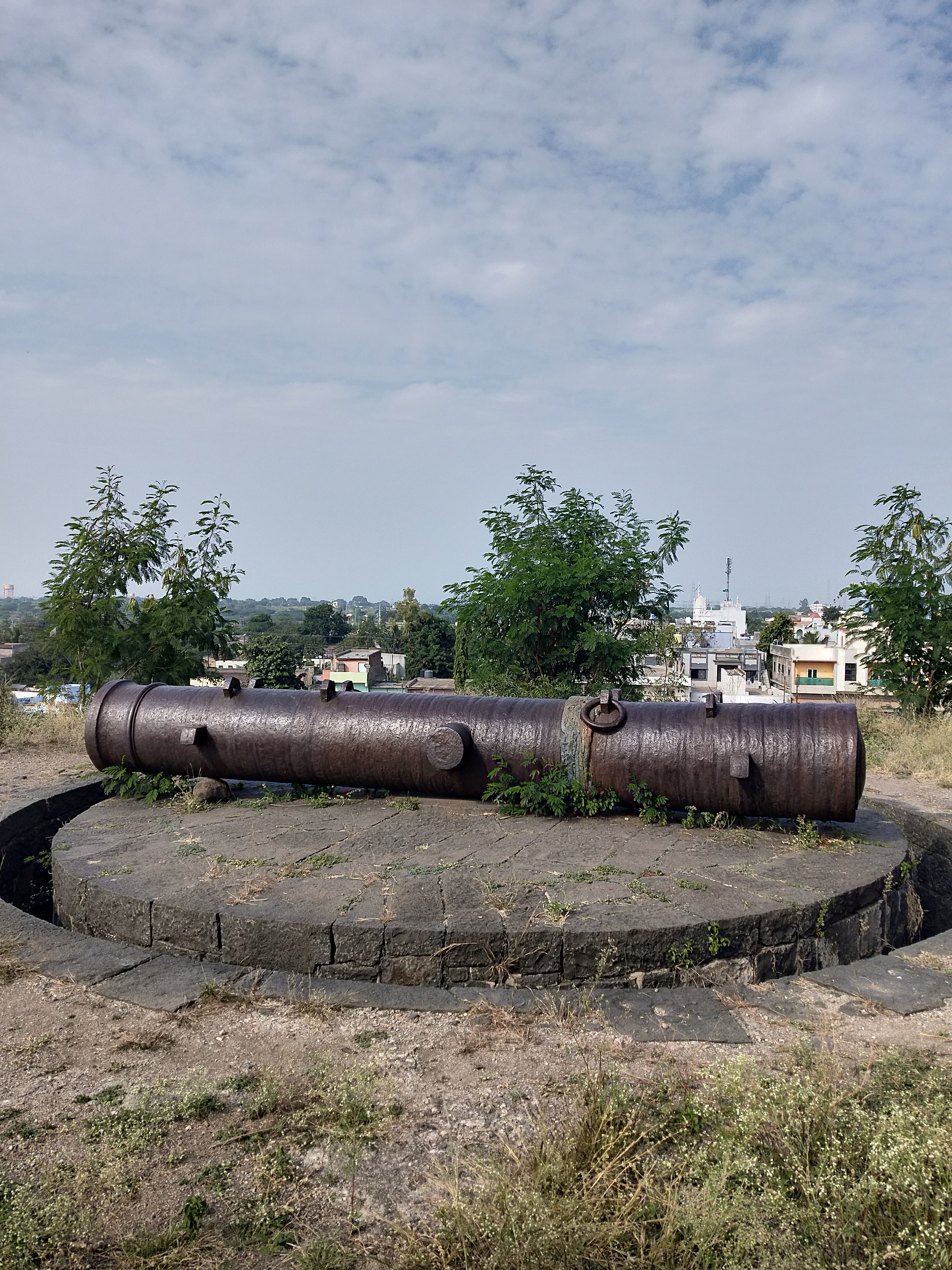
Kalal bangdi cannon II

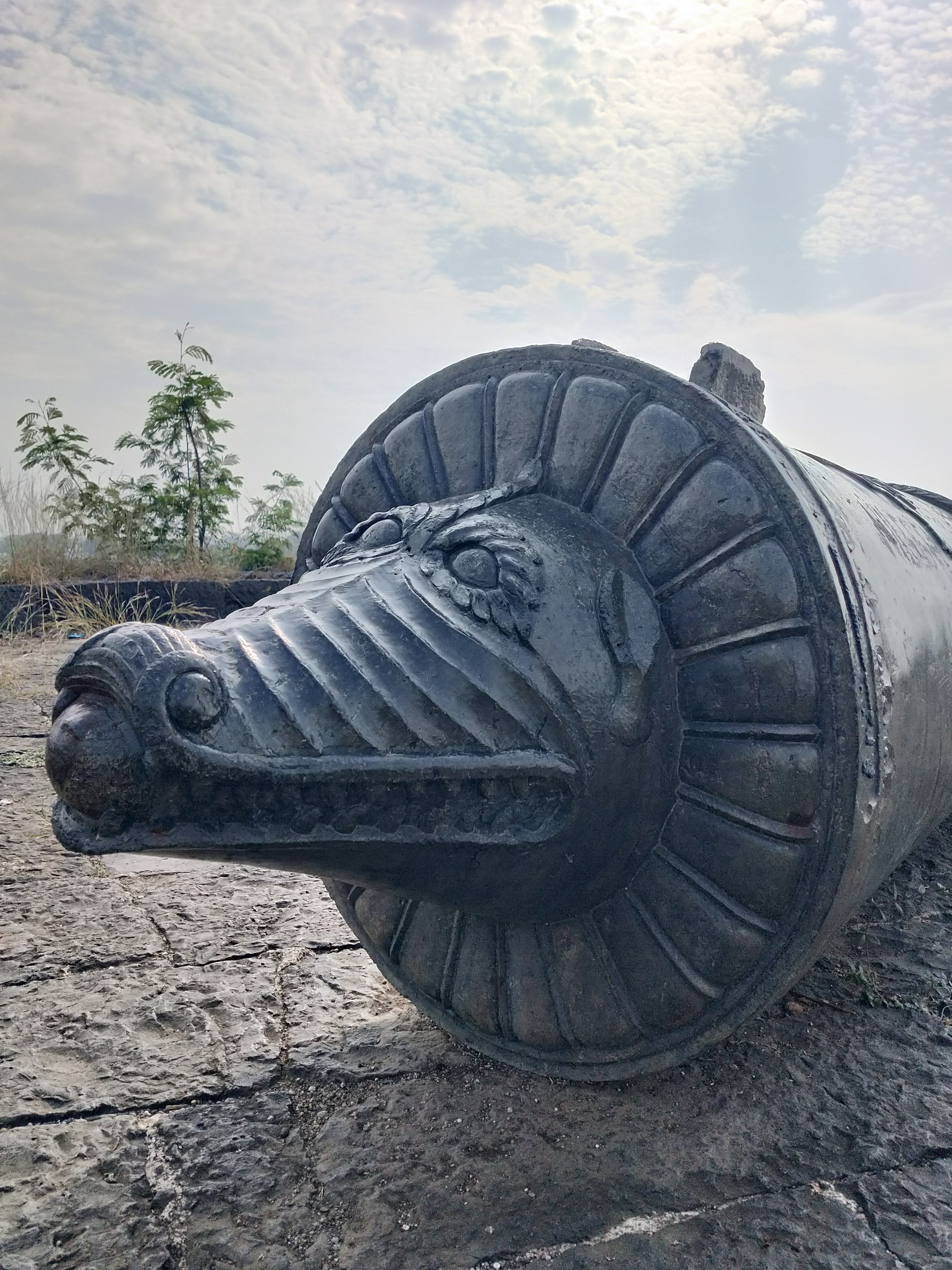
Magar (Crocodile) faced cannon

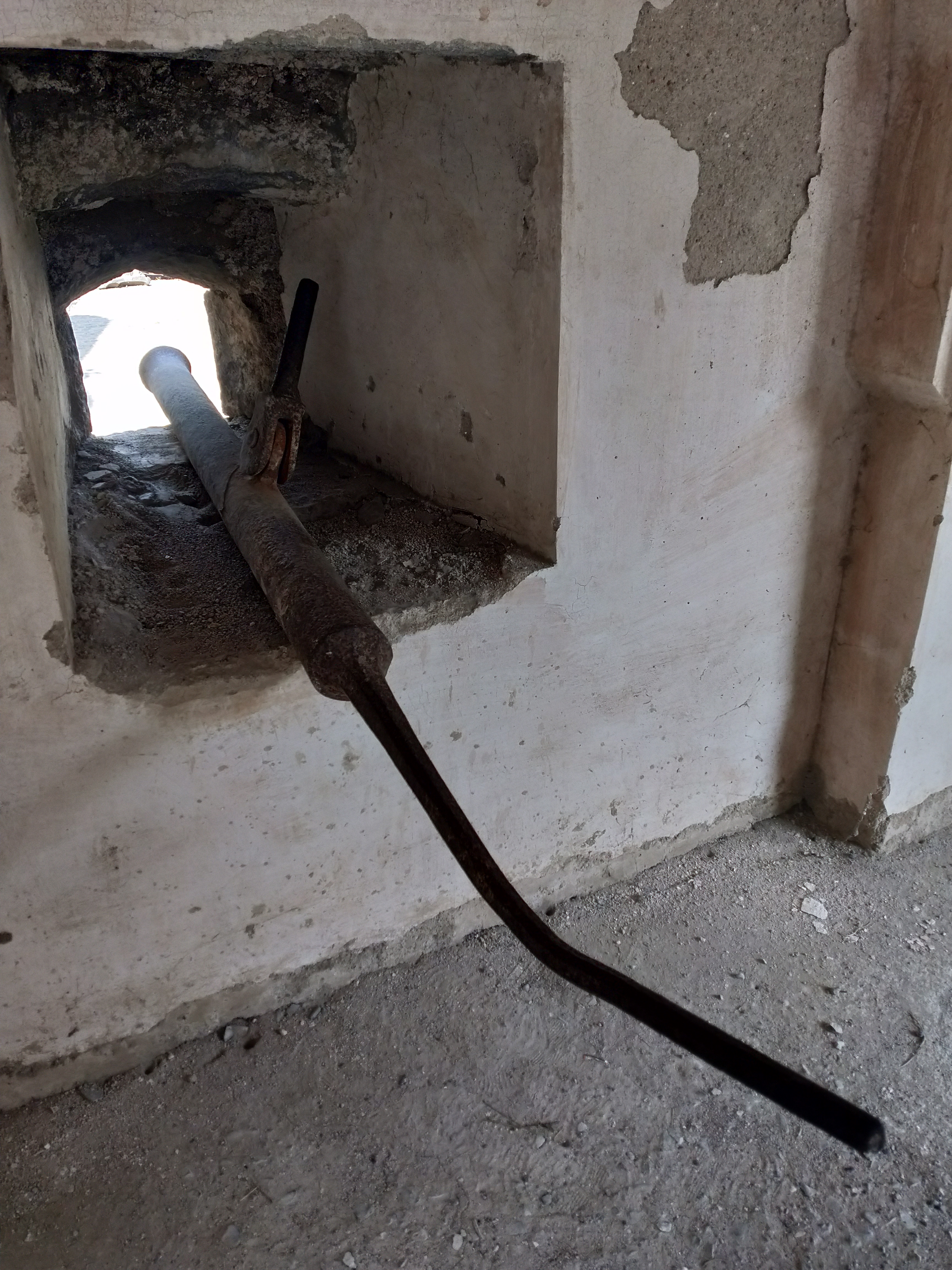
Short mobile cannon gun

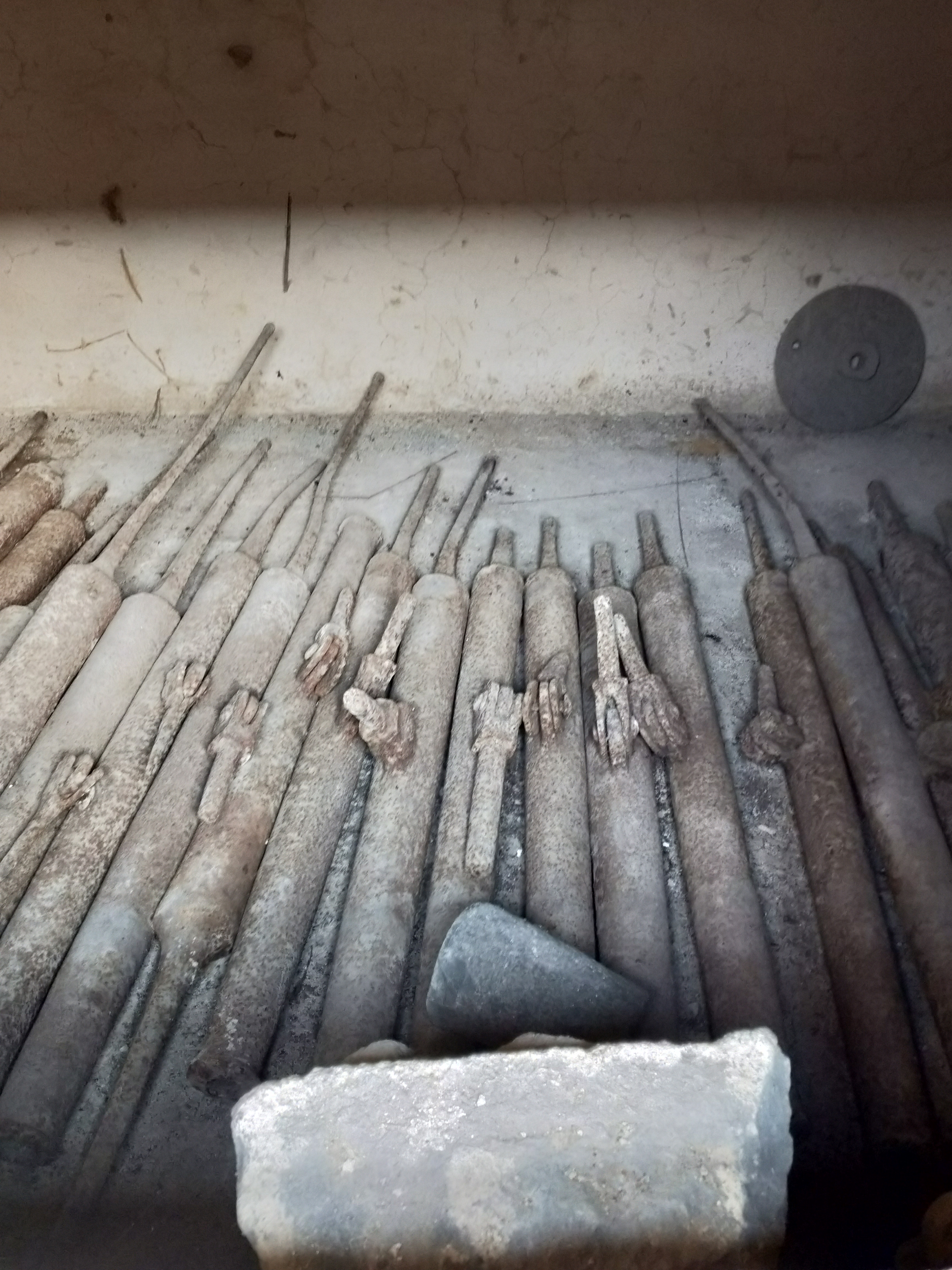
Large storage of short mobile cannon gun

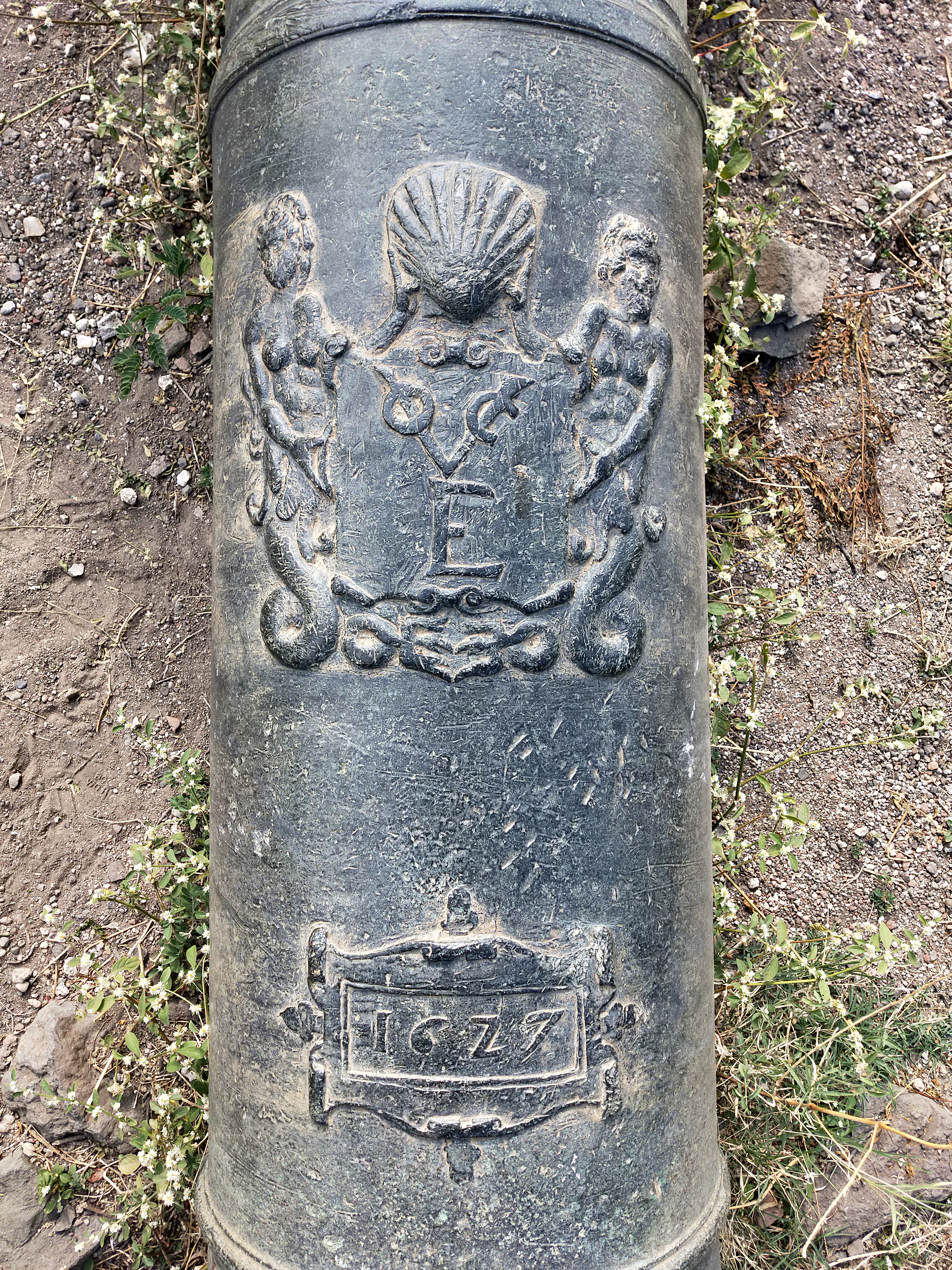
Cannon made by Dutch/United East India Company - Verenigde Oostindische Compagnie (VOC) 1627

== Description ==
The fort is shaped like a parallelogram, with the northern and southern walls being slightly longer than the remaining two. The outermost defence consists of a glacis encircling the entirety of the fort. This is followed by an outer wall, rising to a height of 13 feet.

=== Jami Masjid ===
The mosque building has three entrances, to the north, south, and east. Of these, the main entrance is the eastern one, in the form of a porch, which is entered through a large arched doorway.

== Gallery ==
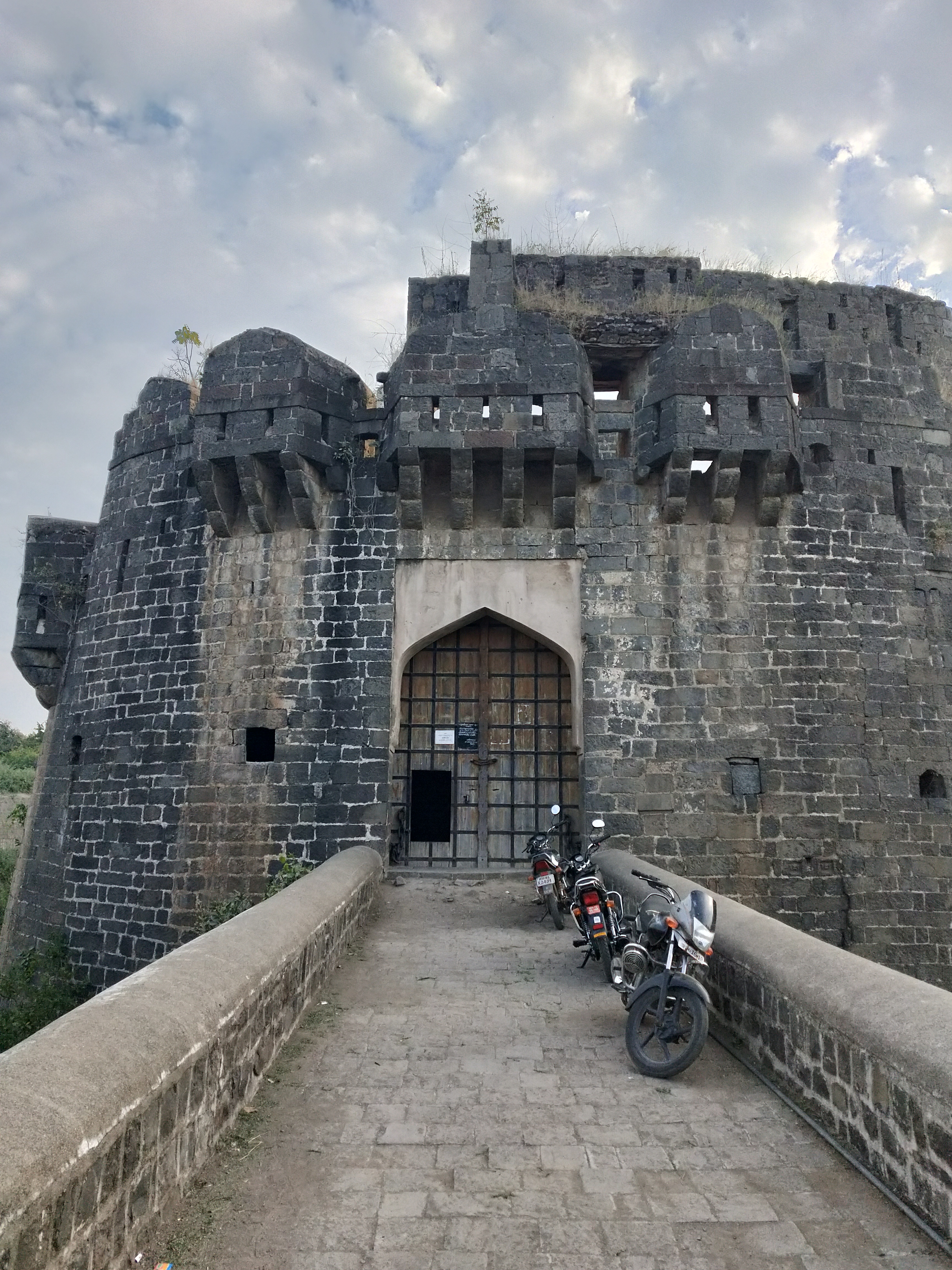
Main entrance door

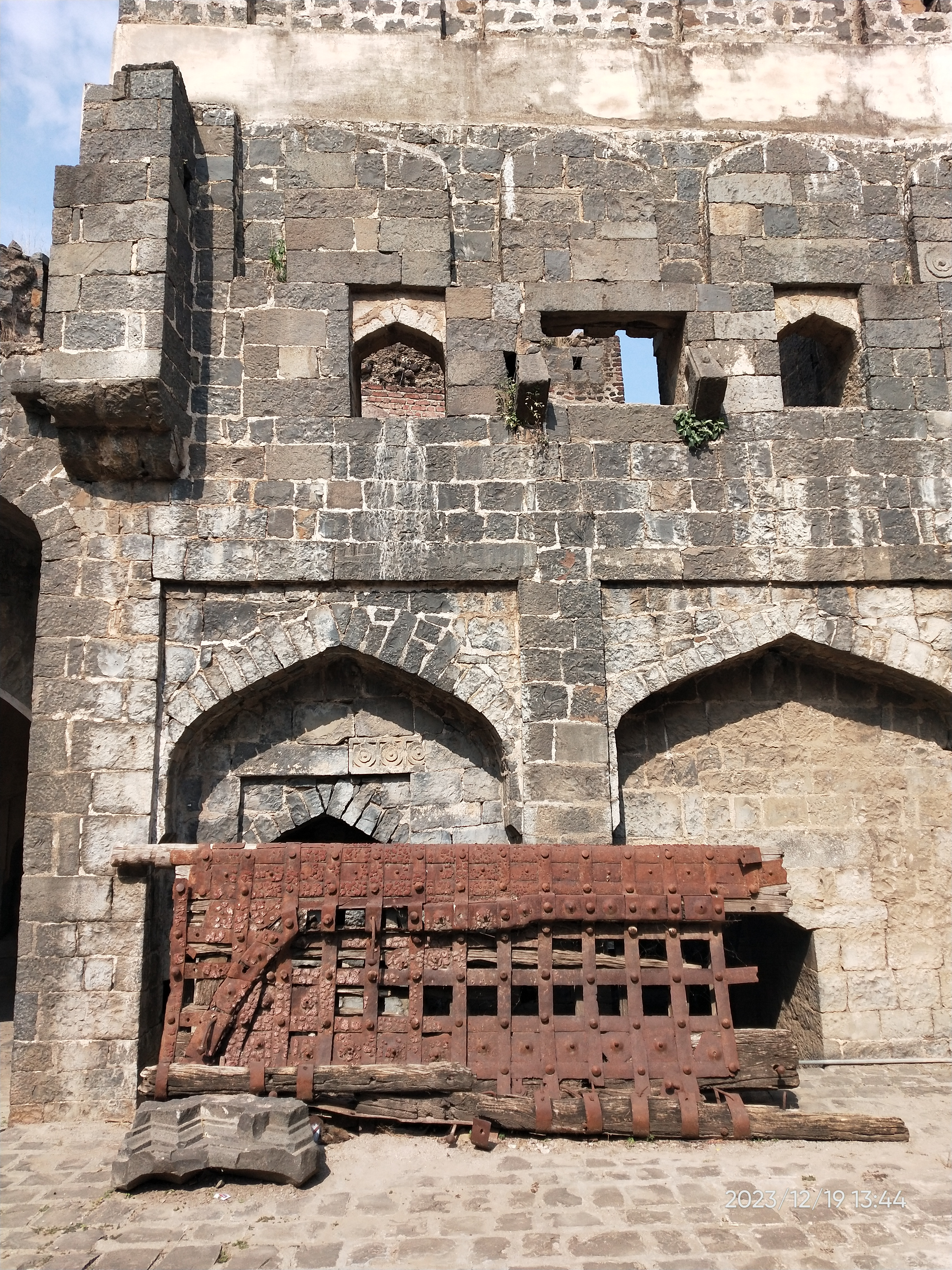
Abandoned Metal door

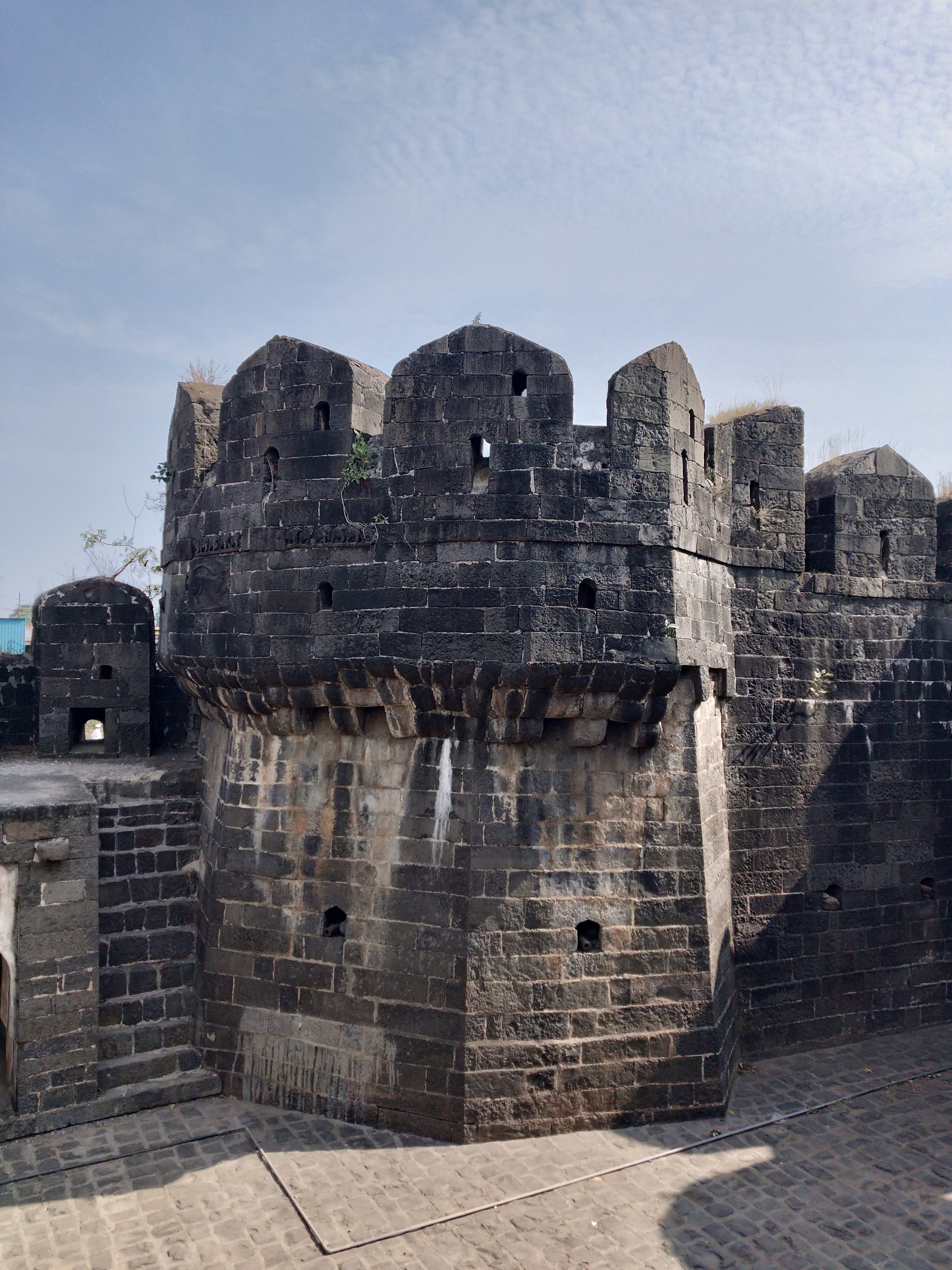
Bastion

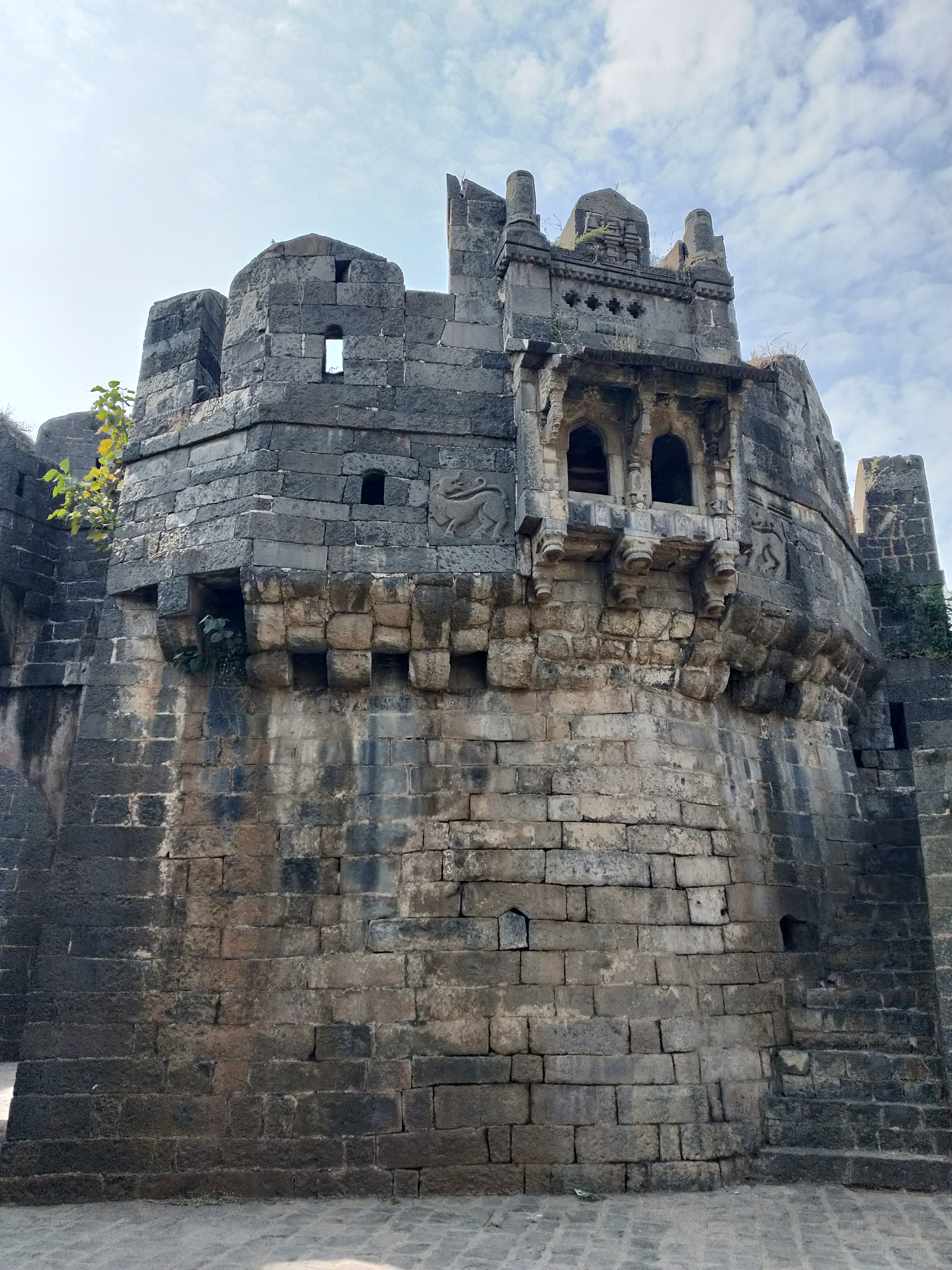
Bastion with window

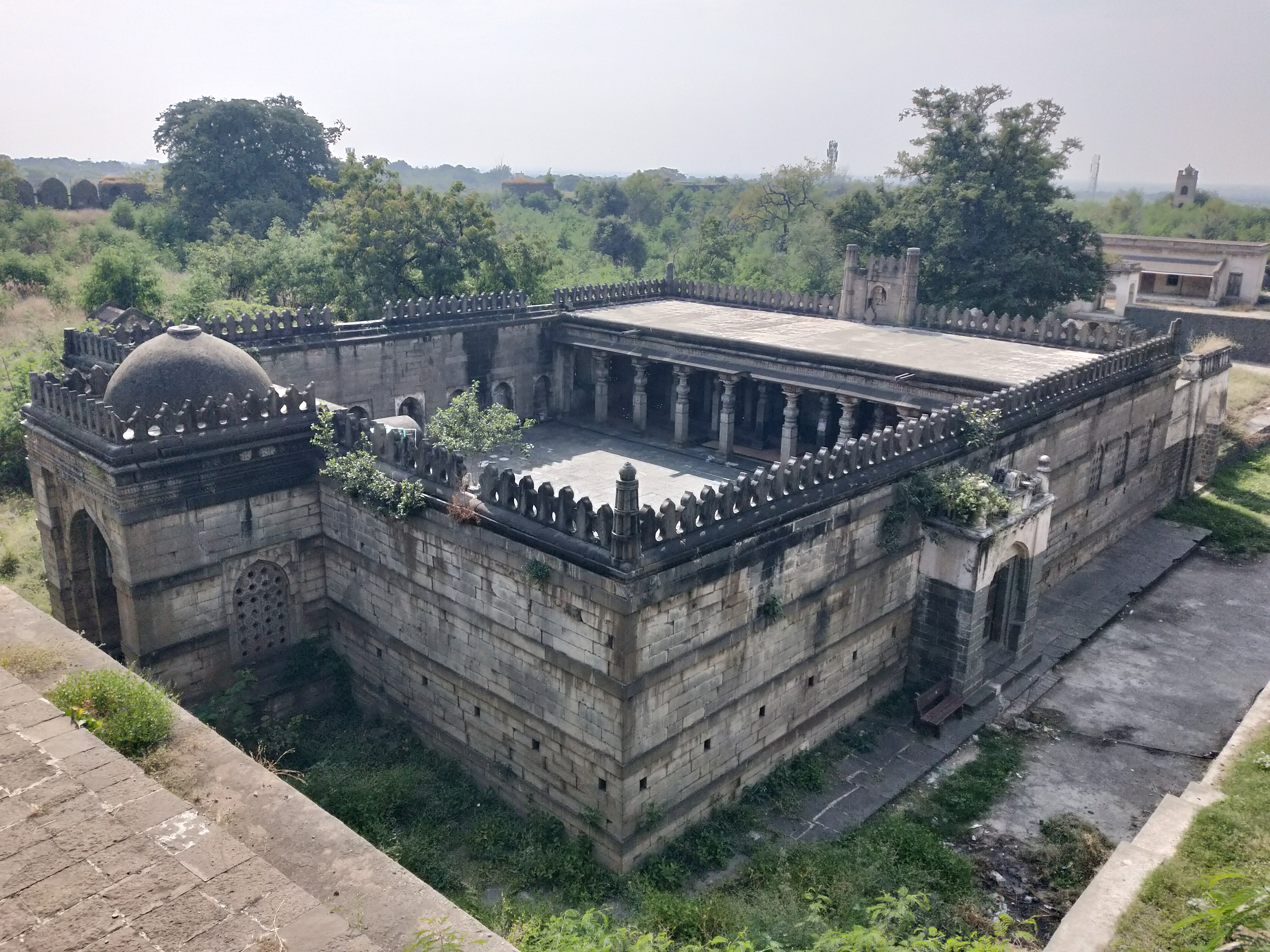
Sacred monument

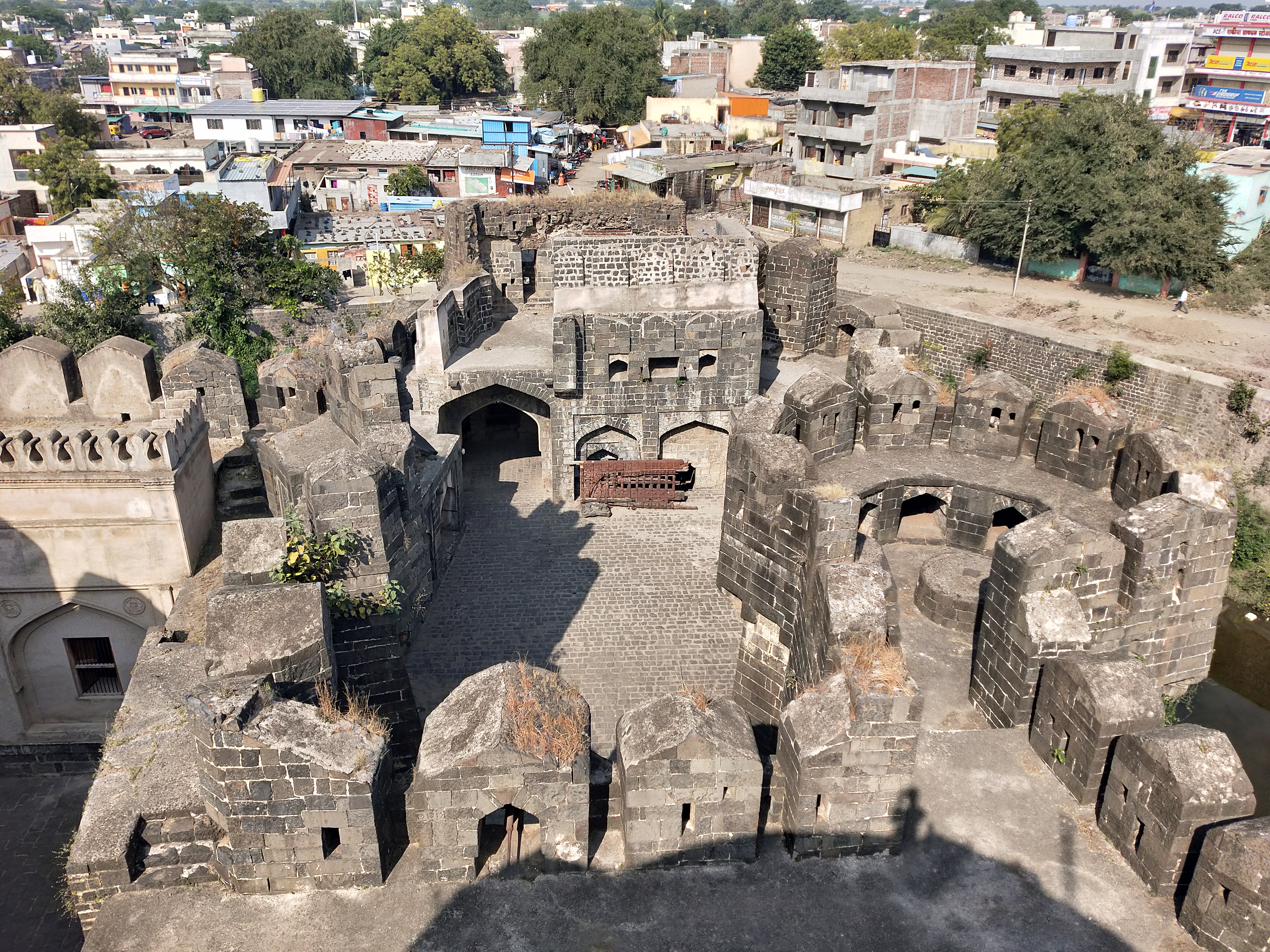
Entrance complex

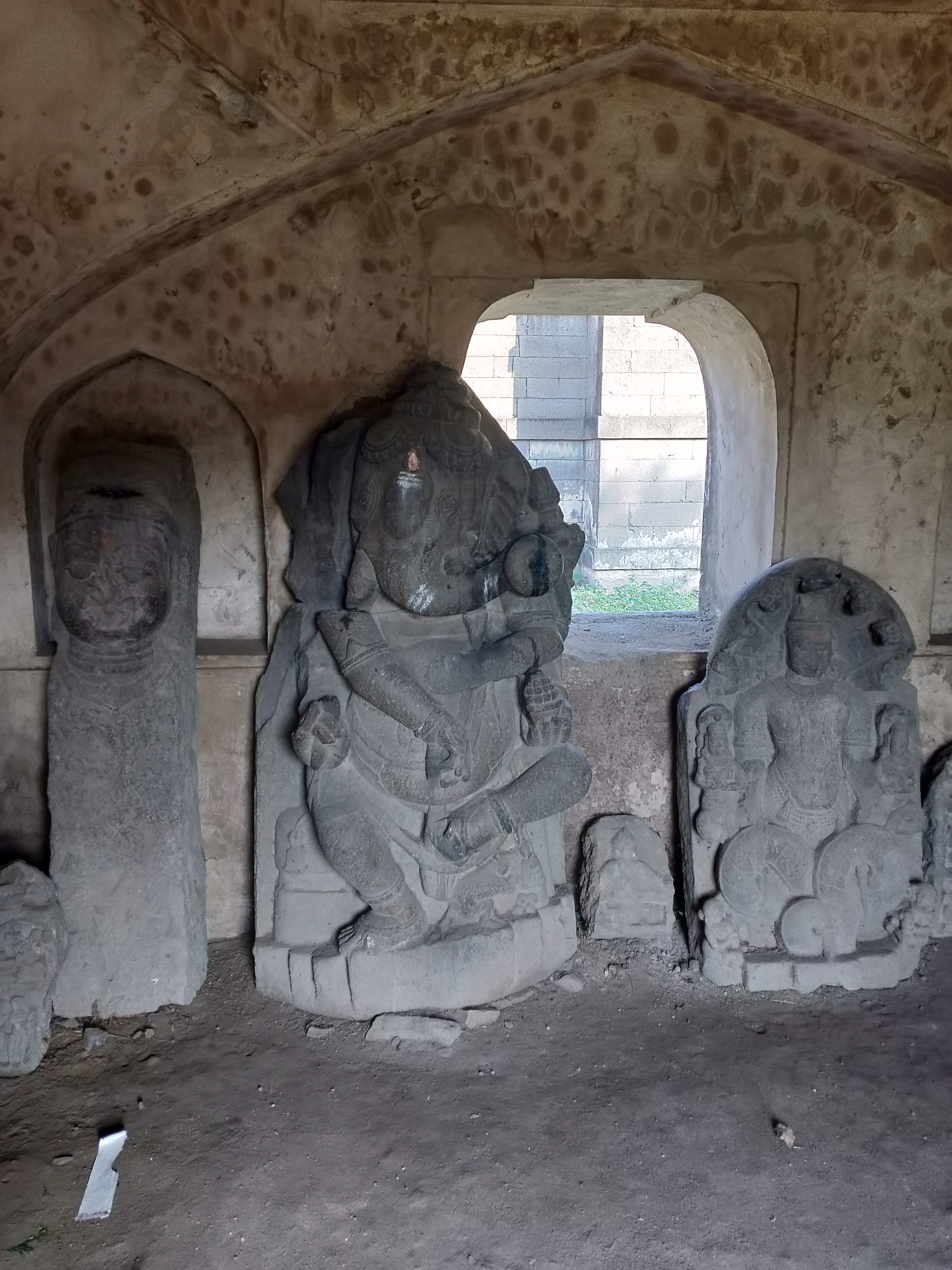
Ganesha sculpture

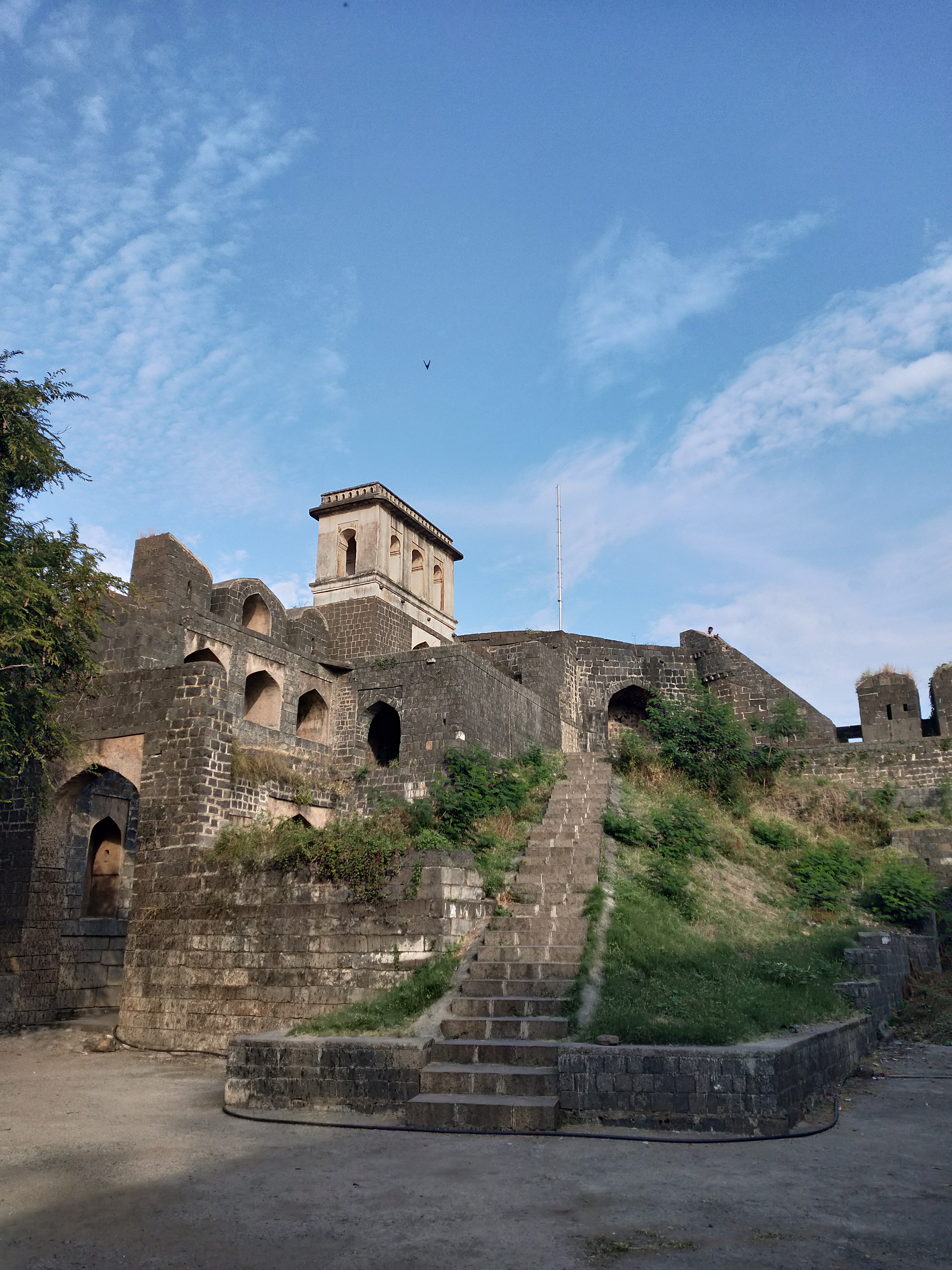
Structure

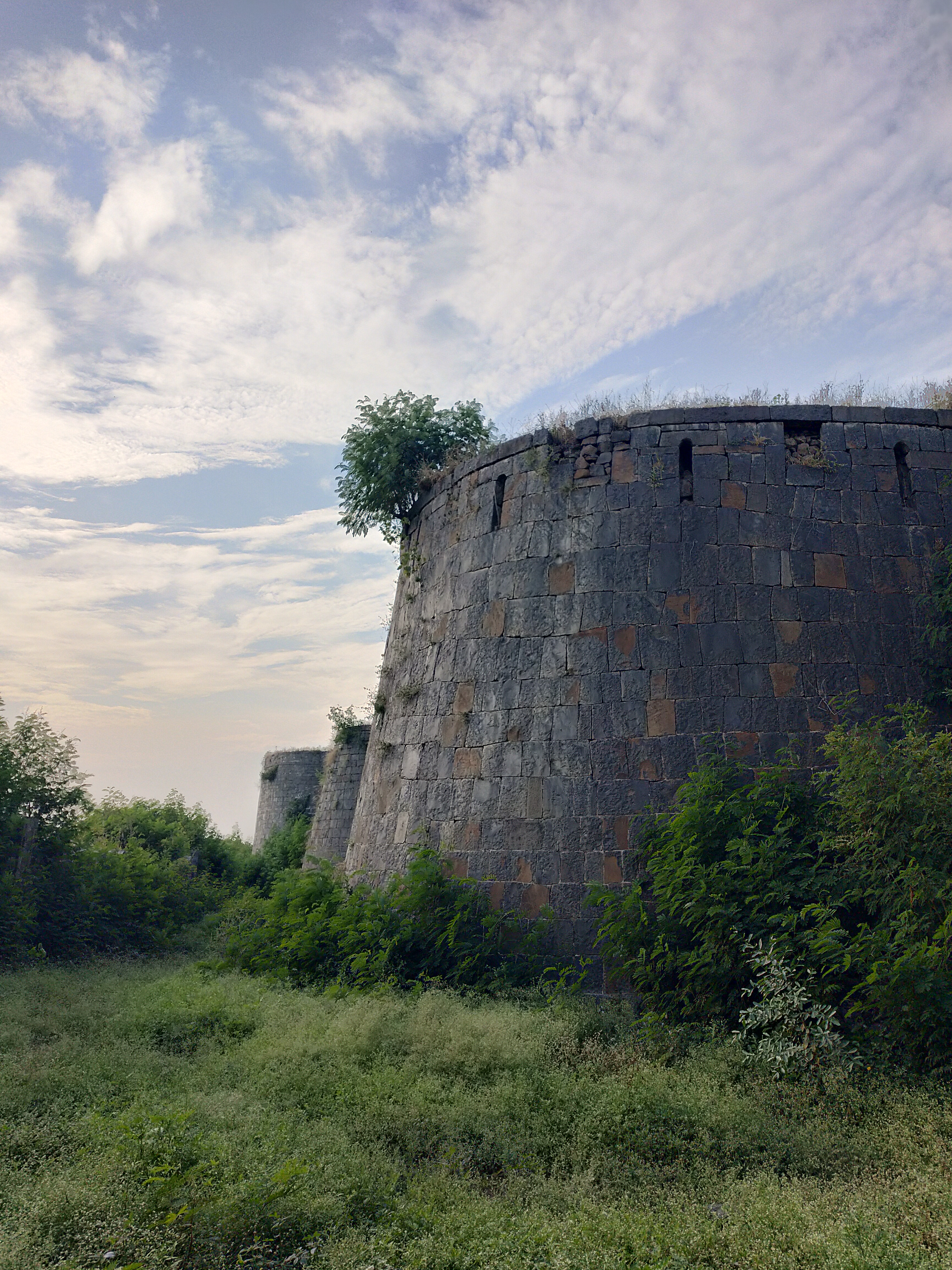
Bastion and fortification

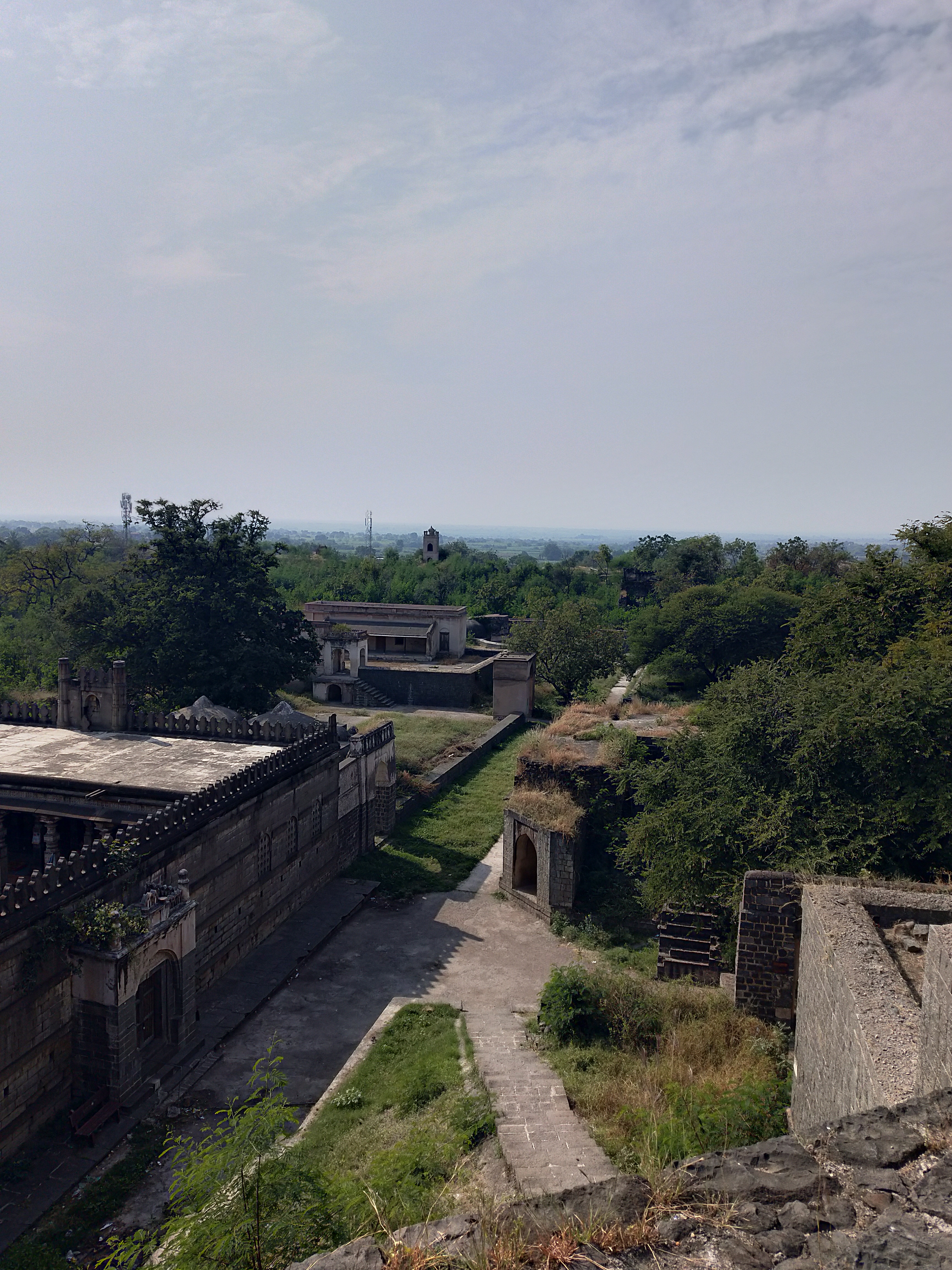
Construction inside fort

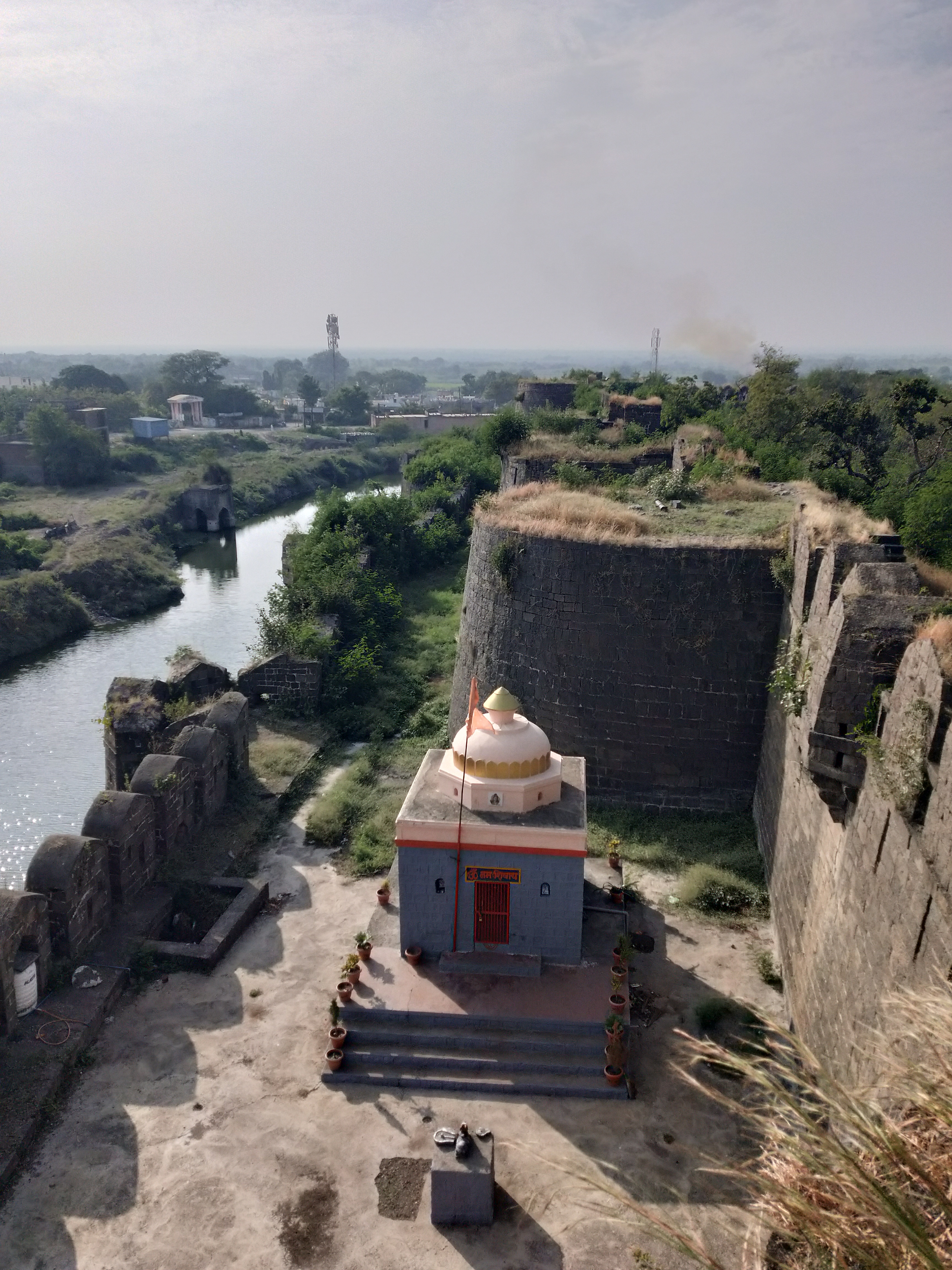
Moat and double fortification protection
