= Khwaja Sabir =

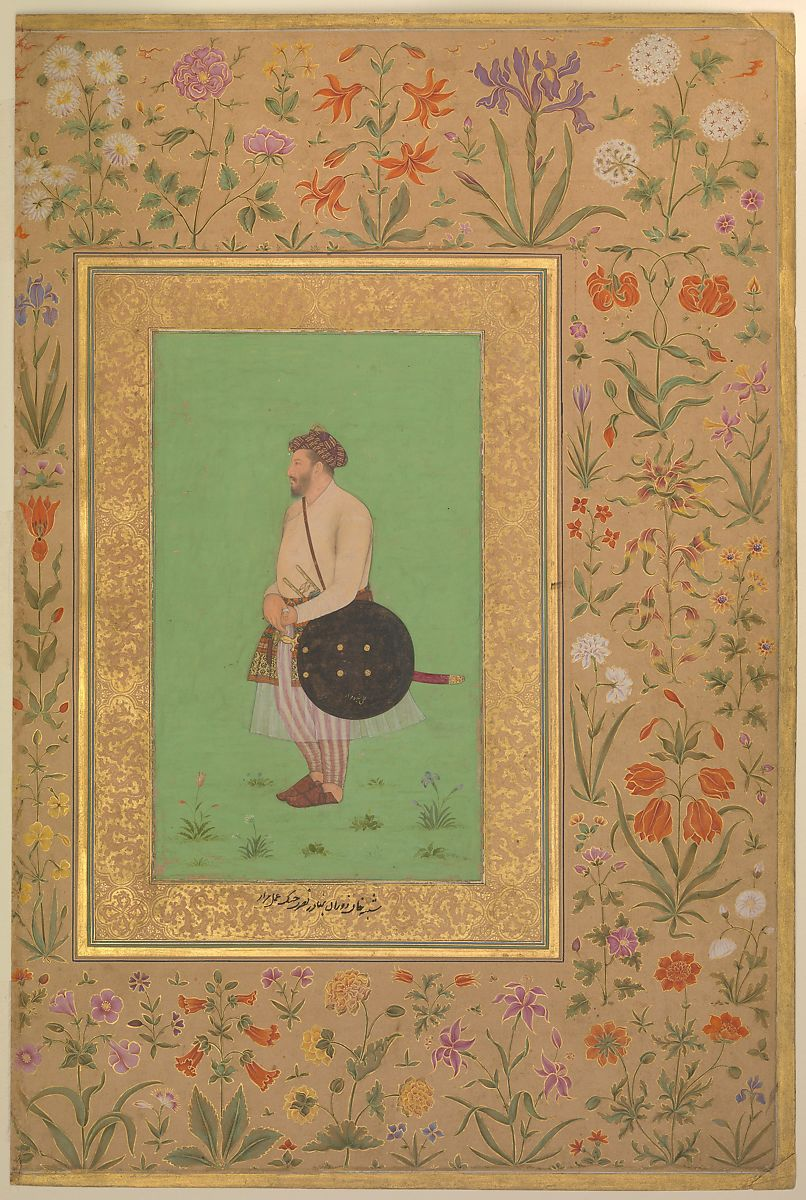
- Portrait of Khan Dauran Bahadur Nusrat Jang, painted by Murad, a painter best known for his illustrations in the Padshahnama
- Born: 17th century Mughal Empire
- Died: 1645
- Relatives: Khwaja Hisari Naqshbandi(father); Abdullah Khan (father-in-law)
- Military career
- Allegiance: Mughal Empire
- Service years: c. 1620 - 1645
- Commands: Mughal Governor of Malwa
- Conflicts: Battle of Tons (1624); Siege and conquest of Qandahar; Siege of Daulatabad (1633); Siege of Parenda (1634); Siege of Nagpur (1637)

Khwaja Sabir, Nasiri Khan or Khan-i-Dauran was an Indian Muslim viceroy of the Deccan and one of the Mughal emperor Shah Jahan’s leading sardars. He received the title "Khan Dauran" during the conquest of Daulatabad. He died in Lahore in 1645 from a knife wound from his own attendant, a Kashmiri Brahmin. He held the rank of 7,000 soldiers.

== Career ==
According to Athar Ali, Khan-i Dauran was born in India, and as he belonged to the Hindustani Shaikhzadgan group of nobles, he was an Indian Muslim, the son of Khwaja Hisari, a member of the Naqshbandi order. The real name of Khan Dauran was Khwaja Sabir. The Mughal emperor Jahangir made him an officer of high rank and sent him to the Deccan. Khan Khanan, the famous poet, finding him a youth of enterprising spirit, strived to give him the necessary training. But finding the work unpleasant, Sabir left Khan Khanan and entered the service of the Nizam Shahis. He gained the position of Aide-de-camp through his friend at the Nizam Shahi court and received the title of "Shahnawaz Khan". However, he did not remain for long here as well, abhorring his work and resigned.

== Service under the Mughals ==
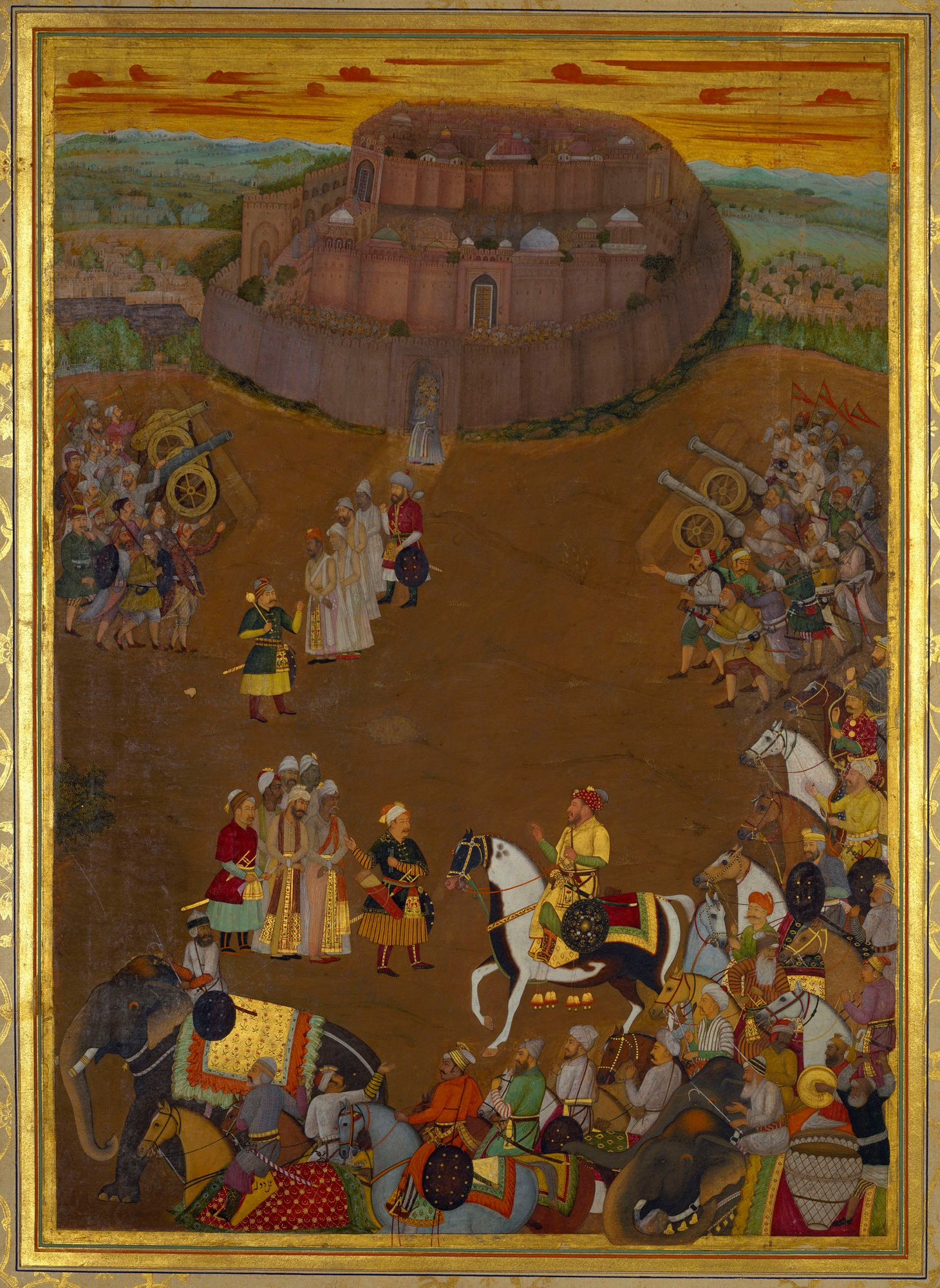
The Surrender of the fort at Udgir to Khan Dauran (October 1636) c. 1640 - 1650

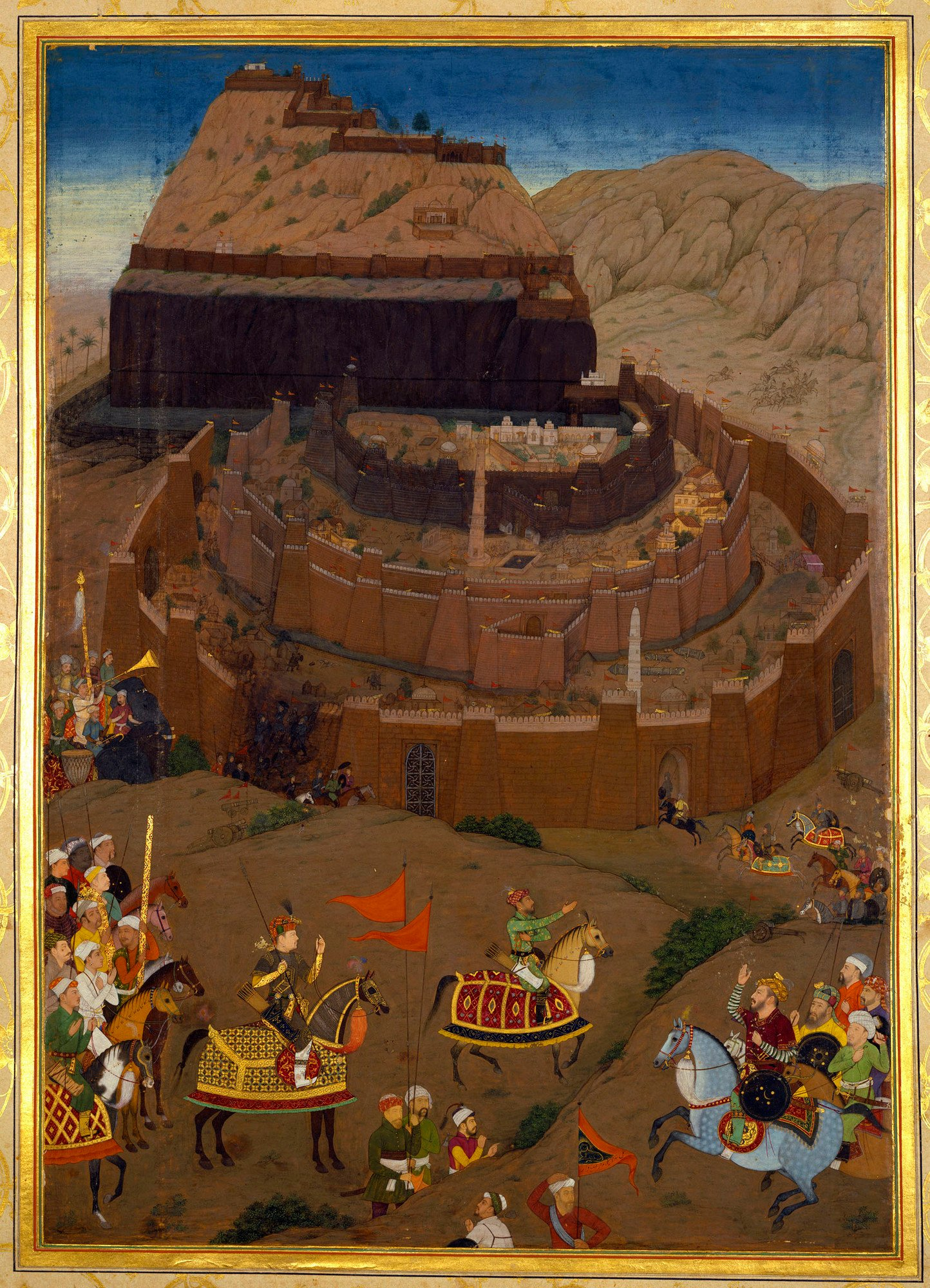
The Siege of Daulatabad (April–June 1633) c. 1635 - 1650. Nasiri Khan arrives on his grey horse (on the right)

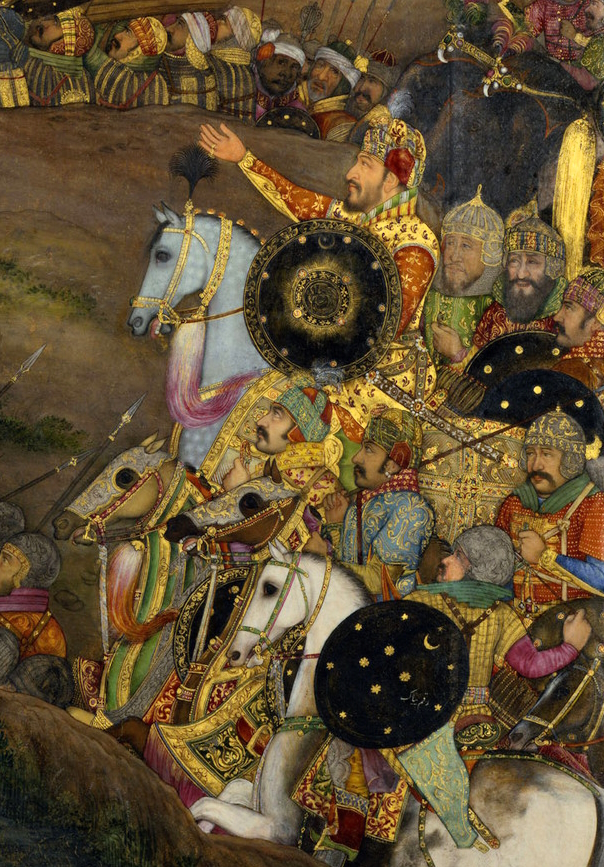
Khwaja Sabir "Nasiri Khan" directing the Siege of Kandhar Fort (Deccan), May 1631: Folio from the Windsor Padshahnama, c.1635-50

Returning to Mughal territory, he got employment as a personal attendant of Prince Khurram, who gave him the title "Nasiri Khan". In 1608-1609, Nasiri Khan served as the subedar of the Mughal provinces in the Deccan. He was joined by the Mir Bakhshi, Shaikh Farid Murtaza Khan, an Indian Muslim from Delhi, and patronized in such a way that "this servant was protected from transfers and paucity of jagirs and mansabs". He served Prince Khurram (now titled Shah Jahan) obsequiously, remaining a loyal supporter of the prince during his rebellion against his father, Emperor Jahangir. In the Battle of Tons in 1624, Khwaja Sabir's father-in-law Abdullah Khan deserted the prince, defecting to Malik Ambar, and Sabir was compelled to follow. After Malik Ambar's death, he remained in the Nizam Shahi service until the second regnal year of Shah Jahan, when he presented himself at the Mughal court. Shah Jahan bestowed a mansab of 2,000 cavalry upon him.

He participated in many military campaigns such as the Siege and conquest of Qandahar and the conquest of Daulatabad, in both of which he distinguished himself. He captured the Daulatabad fortress in 1632 and imprisoned the Niazm Shahi prince Husain Shah. For his distinguished services during the latter campaign, he was rewarded with the title of "Khan Dauran" and a mansab of 5,000. He then participated in the failed Siege of Parenda (1634) where he narrowly rescued the siege commander Mahabat Khan from capture. In 1631, he was appointed governor of Malwa. In 1636, Khan Dauran was dispatched to chastise Jhujhar Singh, the rebellious raja of Orchha and his son Bikramjit. He sent their heads to court, for which he received the title Bahadur.

=== Campaign against the Gonds of Deogarh ===
In 1637, Kok Shah, the Gond raja of Deogarh had defaulted in payment of tribute to the Mughals and had given safe passage to the rebel Jhujhar Singh. Hence to punish him, Khan Dauran was given permission by Shah Jahan to invade and demand payment of tribute from Kok Shah. Kok Shah refused and his stronghold of Nagpur was besieged and captured by Khan Dauran, followed by Kok Shah's surrender and payment of extra tribute. The victorious Khan-i-Dauran returned to the Emperor, with 8 lakhs of rupees levied from the Gond chiefs and others, and was extolled and given the high title of Nusrat Jang or "Victorious in War”. He also presented 200 elephants to Shah Jahan which he had brought from Bijapur and Golconda. The presented elephants included "Gajmoti", an elephant taken from the Qutb Shahis of Golconda, considered the finest elephant in the Deccan.

== Death and legacy ==
In the 13th regnal year of Shah Jahan's reign (1641), Khan Dauran was recalled from the Deccan due to political reasons. He then accompanied the emperor to Kashmir whence he returned to capital of Lahore, from which he prepared to march to the Deccan, pitching his tents outside the city. When Khan Dauran was halted within two miles of the town in the night, he was stabbed in the belly by one of his personal attendants, a Kashmiri youth of the Brahmin caste, whom he had taken from Kashmir and converted to Islam. He was seriously wounded and had no hope of recovering. Hence he divided his property among his sons and he bequeathed the rest to the emperor. Shah Jahan ordered for his remains to be buried in the family vault at Gwalior, and gave his sons more than Khan Dauran had willed.

By the time of his death in 1645, he had been promoted to the highest imperial rank ever held by a non-royal person- 7,000 soldiers. He was of a suspicious disposition and used to treat people with great severity. He was unpopular to such an extent that when news of his death reached Burhanpur, the residents rejoiced greatly, whole shops of sweetmeats being distributed.

== Family ==
His older sons, Saiyid Muhammad and Saiyid Mahmud, were appointed as mansabdars of 1000 soldiers and 1000 horse by Shah Jahan, while his youngest son, Abdun Nabi, was given a mansab of 500. Saiyid Mahmud later received his father's title of Khan Dauran from Aurangzeb, and served as governor of Allahabad and Orissa before dying in 1666.
