= Manyad Dam =

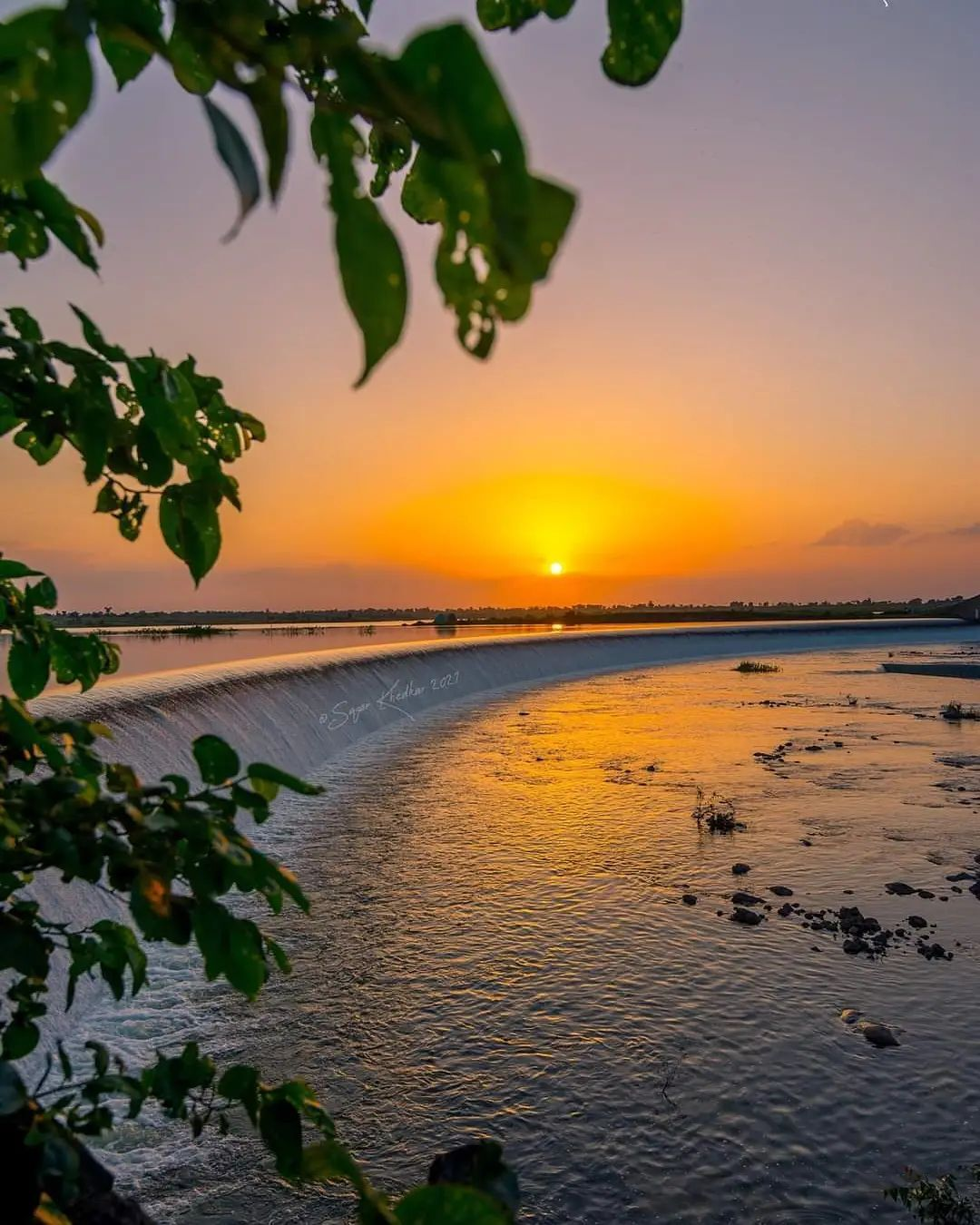

- Location within Maharashtra
- Official name: Manyad Dam D01273
- Location: NANDRE tal chalisgaon
- Coordinates: 20.4796447°N 74.7922526°E
- Opening date: 1973
- Owners: Government of Maharashtra, India

Dam and spillways
- Type of dam: Earthfill
- Impounds: Manyad river
- Height: 45 m (148 ft)
- Length: 1,677 m (5,502 ft)
- Dam volume: 896.5 km^{3} (215.1 cu mi)

Reservoir
- Total capacity: 40,257 km^{3} (9,658 cu mi)
- Surface area: 8,710 km^{2} (3,360 sq mi)

Manyad Dam is an earthfill dam on Manyad River near Nandre, Chalisgaon, Jalgaon district in the state of Maharashtra in India.

== Specifications ==
The height of the dam above lowest foundation is 45 m (148 ft) while the length is 1,677 m (5,502 ft). The volume content is 896.5 km^{3} (215.1 cu mi) and its gross storage capacity is 53,980.00 km^{3} (12,950.49 cu mi).

== Purpose ==
- Irrigation

== See also ==
- Dams in Maharashtra
- List of reservoirs and dams in India
