= Kandhar Fort =

Fort in Maharashtra, India

- Part of Kandhar
- Kandhar, Nanded district, Maharashtra
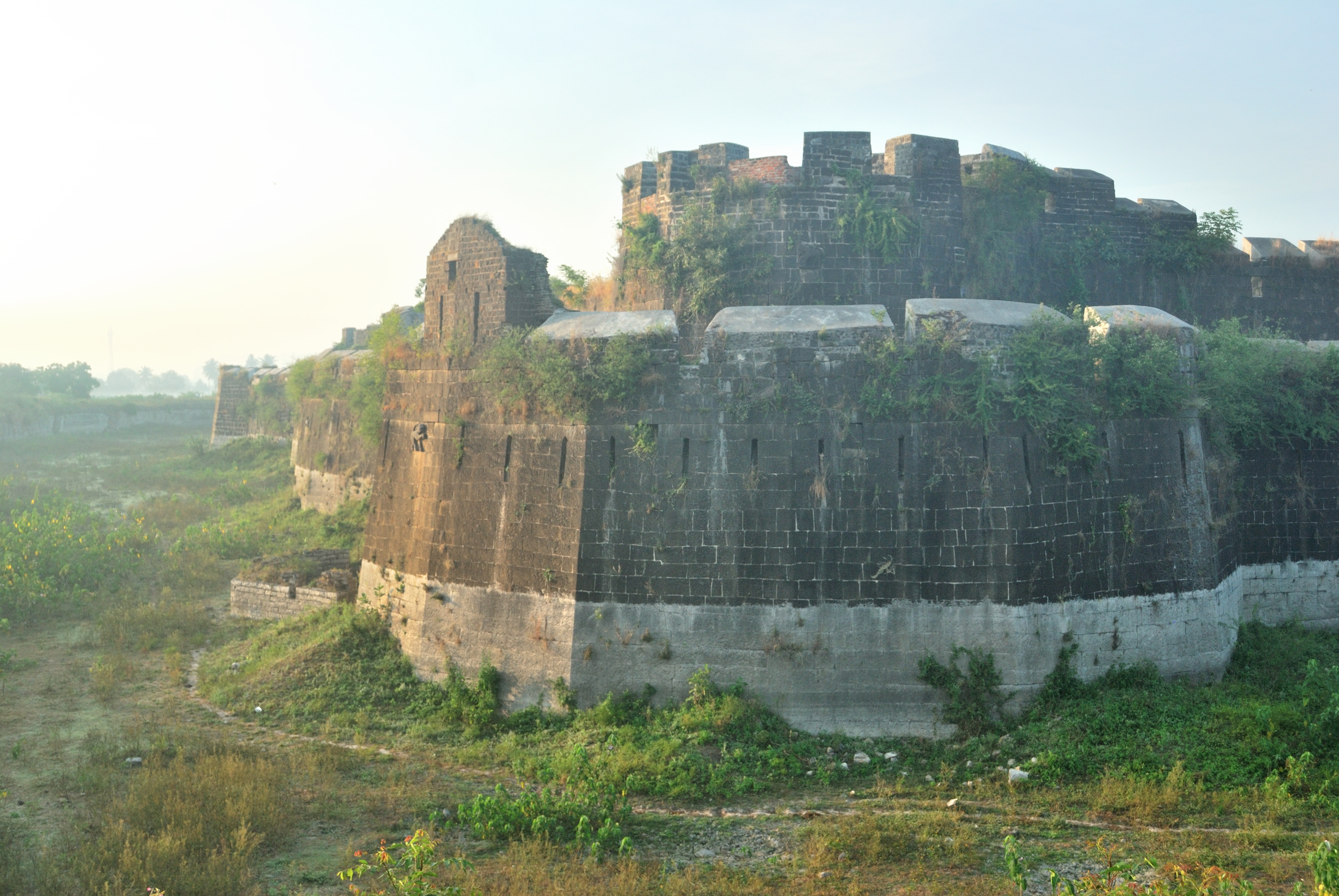

Site information
- Type: Fort
- Owner: Government of India
- Controlled by: Government of Maharashtra
- Open to the public: Yes
- Condition: good

Location
- Kandahr Fort in Maharashtra Kandhar Fort (India)
- Coordinates: 18.9005°N 77.2014°E
- Length: 410 metres (1,350 ft)

Site history
- Built: 939-967
- Built by: Krishna III
- Materials: Black Stones, Cement

Kandhar Fort or Kandhar Khilla is a fort located in Kandhar, Nanded district in the state of Maharashtra, India. Its construction is attributed to the Rashtrakuta King Krishna III of Malkhed.

In 1631, the Mughal Empire army, commanded by Nasiri Khan, captured Kandhar fort after a siege of 19 days. The scene was painted by Payag for the Padshahnama.

== Gallery ==
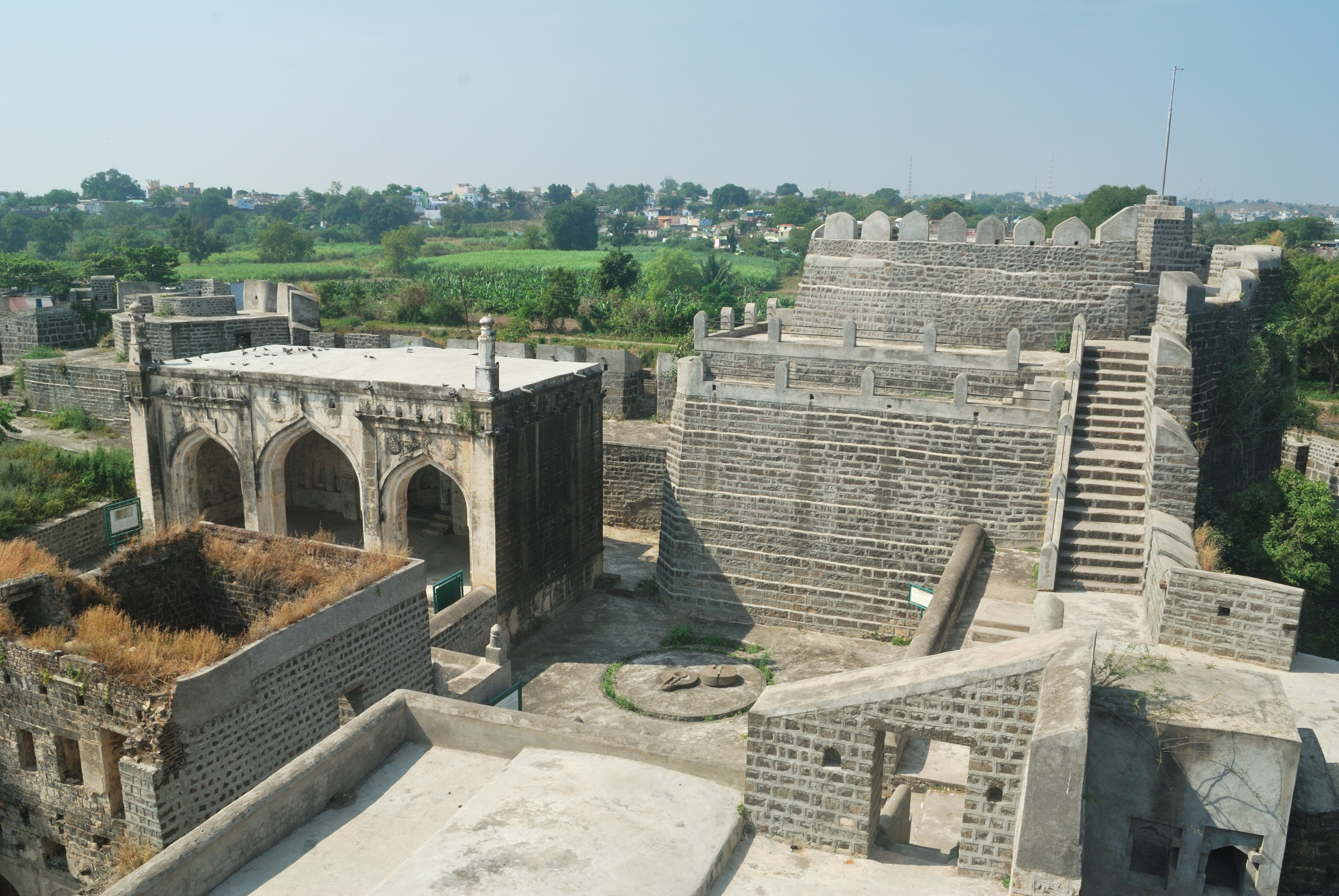

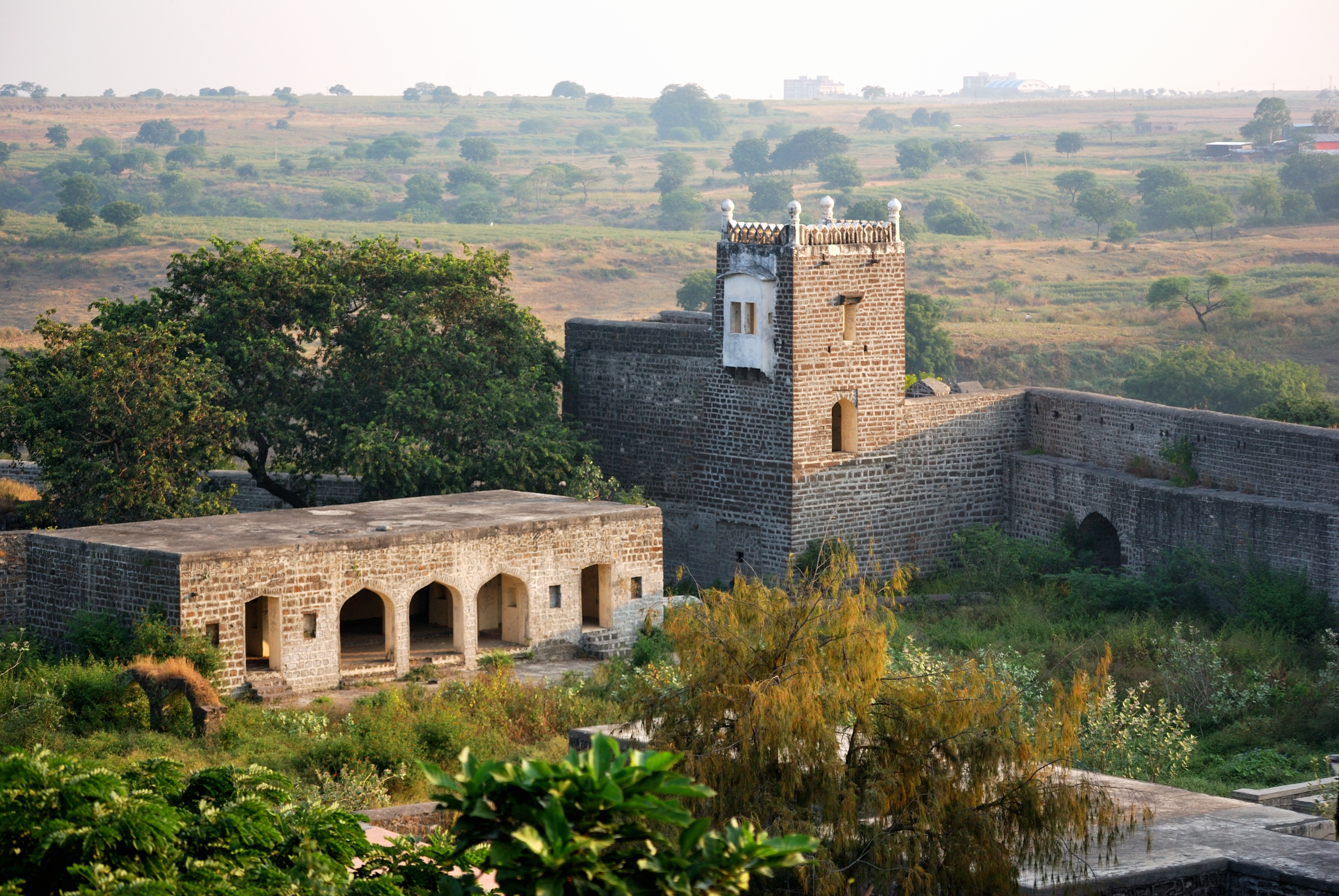

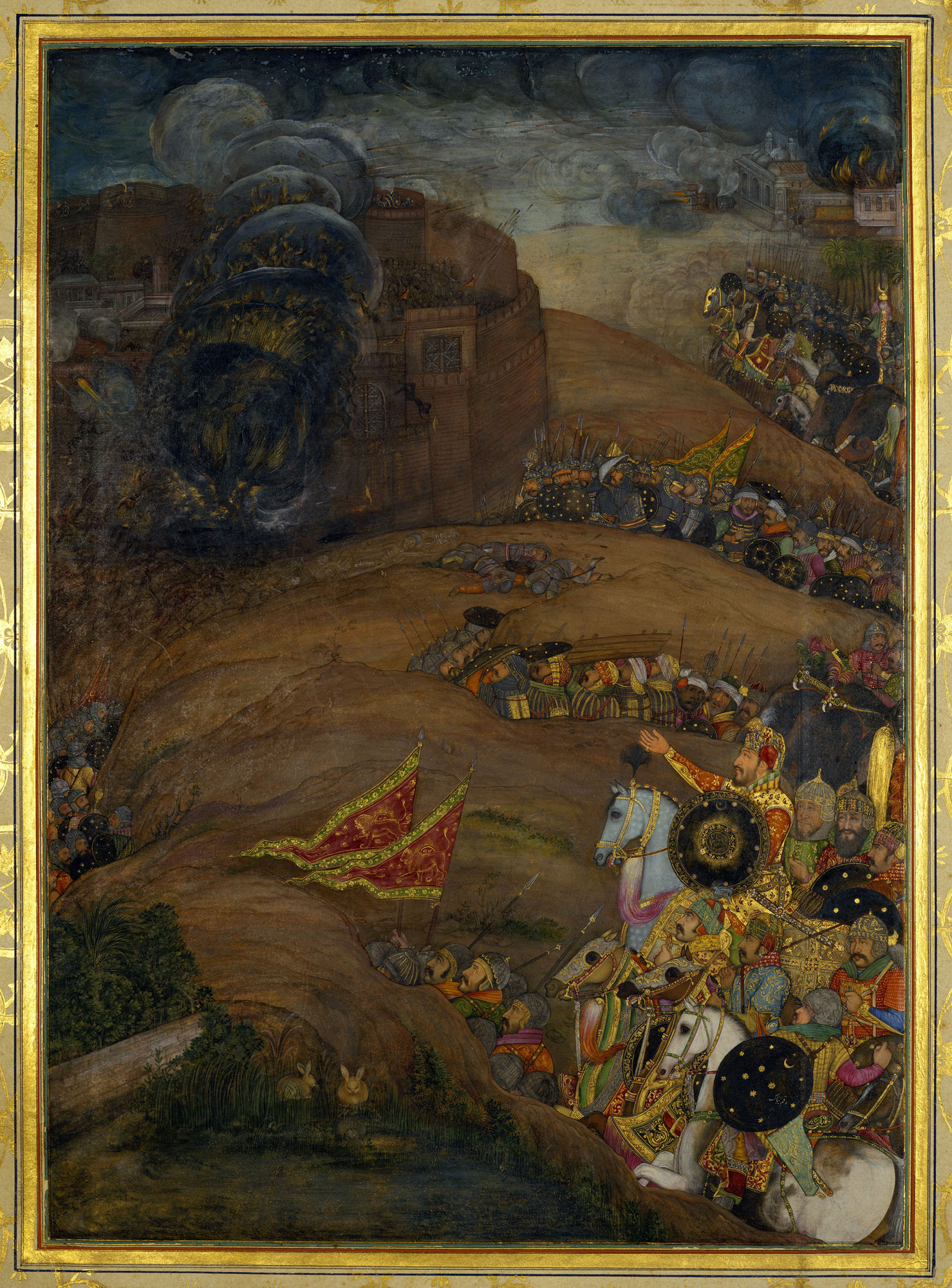
Mughal Siege of Kandhar by Nasiri Khan, May 1631, Padshahnama
