= Siege of Daulatabad =

1633 siege in Daulatabad, India

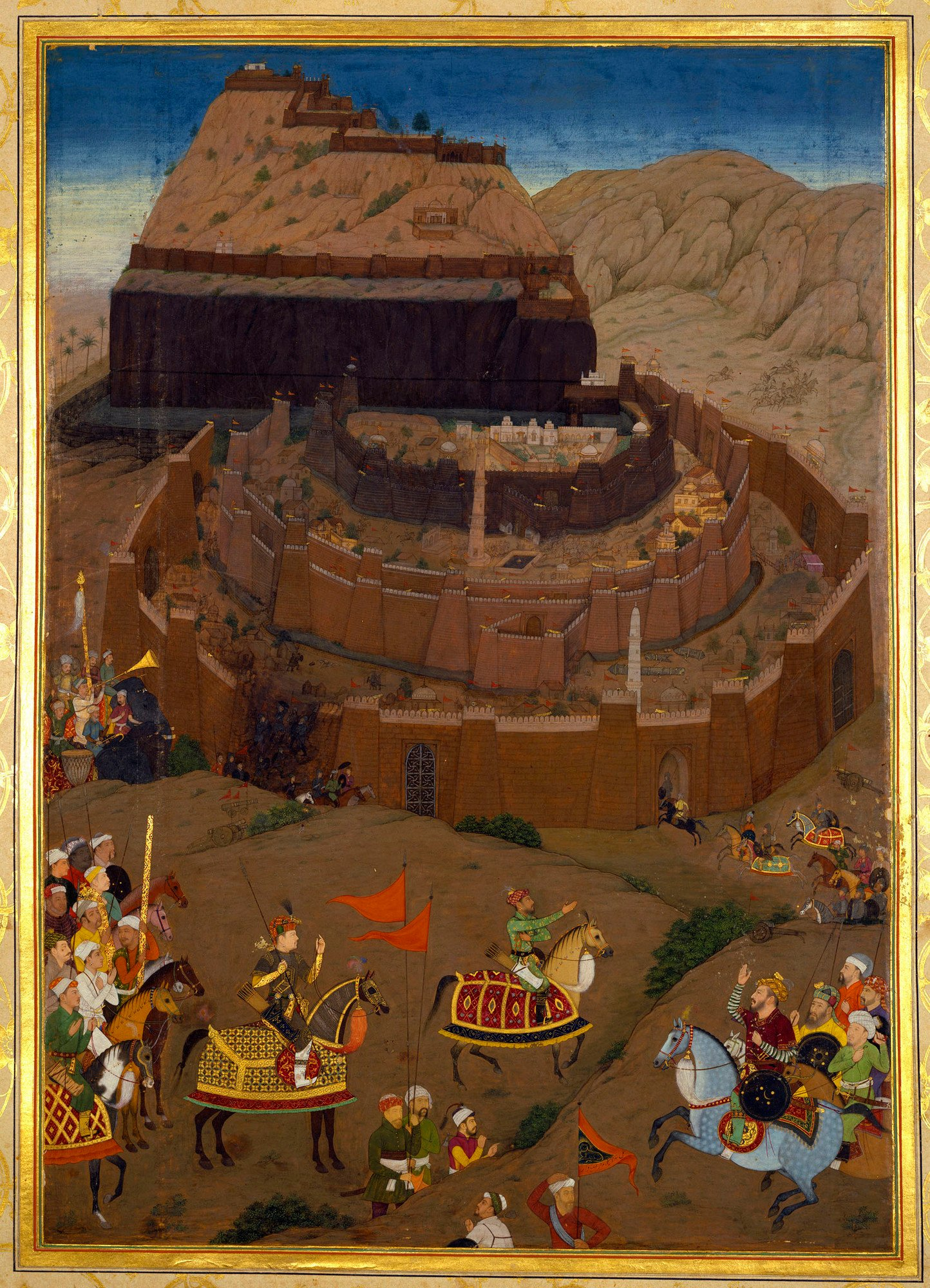
- Illustration of the Mughal siege of Daulatabad fort by Murar from a Padshahnama manuscript c. 1635 – 1650, Royal Collection
Date	1 March – 27 June [O.S. 17 June] 1633
Location	Daulatabad Fort
Result	Mughal victory

Belligerents
Mughal Empire	Ahmadnagar Sultanate; Bijapur Sultanate

Commanders and leaders
Mahabat Khan; Nasiri Khan	Fath Khan; Shahaji Bhonsle; Randaula Khan; Murari Pandit

The siege of Daulatabad in 1633 was a conflict between the Mughal Empire and the Ahmadnagar Sultanate, wherein the fort-city of Daulatabad was besieged by a Mughal force for several months and successfully captured. The Bijapur Sultanate also participated in the conflict against the Mughals, sending a large army to the aid of the fort's garrison. The conflict took place after several Mughal victories securing other minor forts in Ahmednagar control, but was distinguished by the political significance of Daulatabad to the Ahmadnagar Sultanate. This event marked Mughal victory in the ongoing war between the Mughals and the Ahmadnagar Sultanate; it ended the Nizam Shahi dynasty and concluded the Sultanate, marking another step in the Mughal advance over the Deccan region. The victory did not fully quell resistance to Mughal authority in the Western Deccan; a year later, Maratha commander Shahaji Bhonsle attempted a bid for power using a puppet ruler of the Nizam Shahi house.

== Background ==
The Mughal Emperor Shah Jahan succeeded his father Jahangir in the year 1628, following which his attention immediately turned to consolidating Mughal authority over the Deccan Sultanates. Particularly, his objective was to recover Mughal territories lost to the Ahmadnagar Sultanate in the final years of Jahangir's reign. In February 1630, he and his armies marched south in pursuit of Khan Jahan Lodi, a rebel Mughal commander who had defected to the Ahmadnagar Sultanate. Upon the successful capture and execution of Lodi, Shah Jahan began campaigning against the Ahmadnagar Sultanate from his base in Burhanpur. These events coincided with the Deccan famine of 1630–1632, which devastated the countryside.

At this time, the Ahmadnagar Sultanate was tenuously ruled by its prime minister Fath Khan, son of Malik Ambar, and power was nominally in the hands of Burhan Nizam Shah III. Daulatabad served as the seat of Nizam Shahi power. Since Shah Jahan's arrival in the region, the Mughals had captured a number of lesser forts. In 1632, Fath Khan decided to acknowledge Mughal sovereignty. He performed several acts to prove his sincerity, including the execution of Burhan Nizam Shah, the installation of boy prince Hussain Shah as ruler, and the execution of a number of leading officers of the kingdom. Shah Jahan eventually acquiesced and withdrew to the north in 1632, partly due to the death of his wife Mumtaz Mahal a year prior. He appointed Mahabat Khan as governor of the Deccan.

Fath Khan's submission was unpopular in the Ahmadnagar Sultanate. It prompted the commander Shahaji Bhonsle to defect from the Mughal side and negotiate with the Sultanate of Bijapur, which sent a large army to seize the Daulatabad Fort, commanded by Randaula Khan and Murari Pandit. Fath Khan wrote to Mahabat Khan, seeking Mughal support to fend off the Adil Shahi force. Mahabat Khan dispatched his son Khan Zaman to his aid. Khan Zaman's army advanced on Daulatabad; Adil Shahi forces, as well as a force commanded by Shahaji, tried to stop the advance but failed. This prompted Randaula Khan, a general of the Adil Shahi army, to open negotiations with Fath Khan. The latter was convinced to switch sides and oppose the Mughals; Fath Khan prepared to defend the fort from the advancing Mughal forces. When Mahabat Khan was informed of this news, he ordered Khan Zaman to open a siege on Daulatabad's fort.

== Siege ==
=== Preparations ===
Upon receiving orders from his father Mahabat Khan, Khan Zaman dispatched Deccani forces that had been obstructing the Mughal advance, and then began preparations for a siege by digging trenches and laying mines. Mahabat Khan himself arrived at the city on 1 March 1633, after securing supply lines for the Mughal forces, and the next morning took up residence in a house belonging to the Nizam Shahi king. The fort was surrounded, and batteries were stationed at strategic points.

Fath Khan moved the Nizam Shahi King Hussain Shah to Kalakot, a well-fortified section within the Daulatabad fort. He himself resided in Mahakot, another section of the fort. He worked to fortify different parts of the citadel by distributing command and installing guns at vital locations.

=== Capture of Ambarkot ===
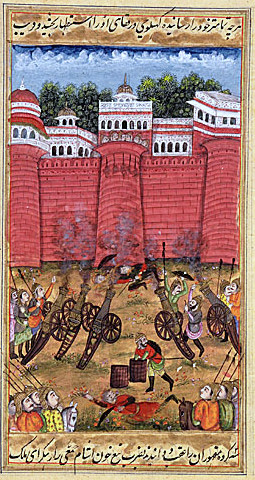
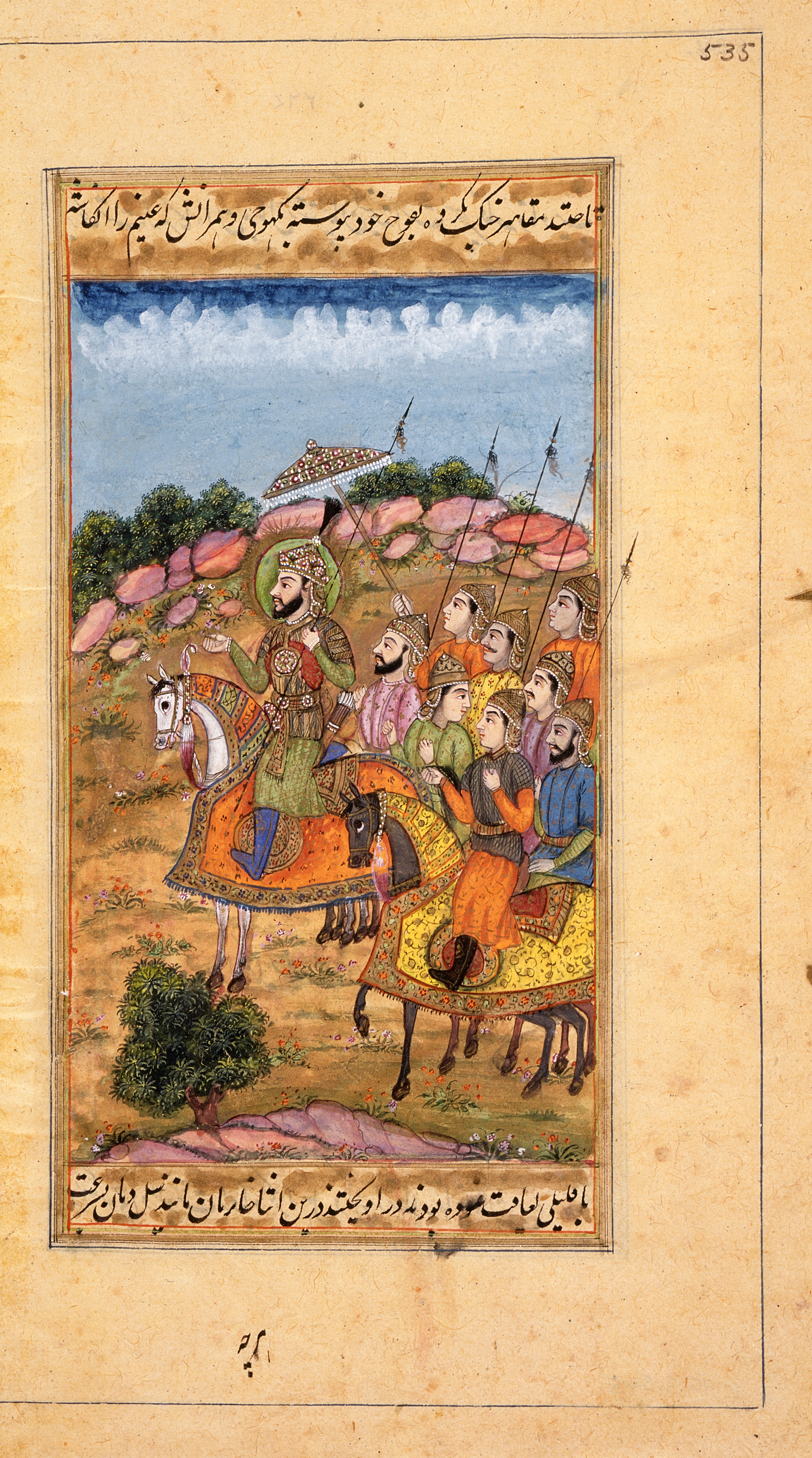
A Mughal folio from a copy of the Padshahnama, featuring a retrospective depiction of the assault on Daulatabad fort, c. 1800.The fort is rendered as a fortified palace, rather than an actual mountain fortress (left). Emperor Shah Jahan watches the assault (right). From LACMA.

The initial stages of the siege were characterised by repeated skirmishes between the Mughal forces, the Adil Shahi army, and Shahji's forces. The Adil Shahis and Shahji repeatedly attempted to subvert the Mughal blockade by sneaking provisions into Daulatabad's fort, and these efforts were frequently caught and cut short by the Mughal army. However, this served as an effective distraction from the Mughals' task of breaking into the fort. The Adil Shahi commander Randaula Khan and Shahji also cooperated in leading several assaults aimed at disrupting Mughal lines of communication, but these attempts were repeatedly rebuked by the Mughal forces.The failure of the Adil Shahi forces and Shahji prompted Fath Khan, who was embedded in the fort, to attempt open combat by sending out war elephants and trying to remove mines; this effort failed, and Fath Khan was forced to retreat after sustaining heavy losses. Khan Zaman pressed the siege of the fort; the plan was to assemble a storming party at dawn, following which a mine would be detonated at first light. In actuality, the officer in charge of the mine mistakenly fired it earlier, before the storming party could arrive. Mahabat Khan resolved to lead the party instead, but Nasiri Khan insisted otherwise and commanded the charge. Mughal forces were able to flood into the breach created by the mine and occupy Ambarkot, the outermost fortification of the citadel, after outnumbering defenders led by Khairat Khan.

=== Capture of Mahakot ===
Following this victory, Randaula Khan and Shahji once again attempted to distract the Mughals and sneak in provisions to feed the fort's starving garrison. They dispatched forces to raid Telangana and Berar, while simultaneously sending grain to the fort with a convoy of 3000 musketeers. Mahabat Khan dispatched forces to foil the raiders, and employed Nasiri Khan to intercept the convoy; both operations were successful. Subsequently, Mahabat Khan began the siege of the next layer of defenses, a fortified sector of the citadel known as Mahakot. He managed to successfully lay a mine in Mahakot's fortifications, which prompted Fath Khan to move his family to Kalakot out of fear. By this point, a number of Bijapuri members of the fort's garrison had exited the fort with Mahabat Khan's permission and returned home, due to the acute food shortage.

Adil Shahi forces and Shahji continued their attempts to disrupt Mughal communications, hoping to reduce pressure on Mahakot. They snuck provisions and raided Berar, but their attempts were disrupted by Khan Zaman. The Deccani side benefited with the arrival of reinforcements from Bijapur, and plans were drawn to lead assaults on Mahabat Khan, but these were also met with defeat.

In less than two months since the penetration of Ambarkot, Mahabat Khan successfully had a mine carried into Mahakot's defenses. This alarmed Fath Khan, who reached out to Mahabat Khan asking to postpone its detonation; the latter asked him to send his son to the Mughal camp as a token of his sincerity, but delays in doing so led to Mahabat Khan firing the mine anyway. The mine destroyed one bastion and eighteen yards of fortifications. Mughal forces entered through this breach and won over Mahakot.

=== Surrender ===
Confronted by the fall of Mahakot, the continuing failure to secure supplies for the fort garrison, general famine in the area, and the breakout of disease among troops, Fath Khan decided to surrender to the Mughal force. He sent his son Abdul Rasul on his behalf, to issue an apology to Mahabat Khan for his treachery. He requested a week's time to evacuate the fort, which Mahabat Khan granted, even giving him supplies and a lump sum to facilitate his departure. Mahabat Khan entered the fort of Daulatabad on 27 June [O.S. 17 June] 1633, and had the khutbah (Friday sermon) read in Shah Jahan's name, symbolising Mughal sovereignty over Daulatabad.

== Aftermath ==
The conquest of Daulatabad fort ended the Ahmednagar Sultanate as an independent principality, and concluded the Nizam Shahi dynasty. Fath Khan was arrested by Mahabat Khan, despite earlier assurance of amnesty; both he and the Nizam Shahi family were brought to emperor Shah Jahan. Fath Khan was allowed a peaceful retirement, but the Nizam Shahi ruler Hussain Shah was imprisoned in Gwalior. Mahabat Khan died in 1634, the year after Daulatabad's successful siege. At the time of his death, he was the highest-ranking Mughal noble of non-royal blood. For his participation in the siege of Daulatabad, Nasiri Khan had his rank raised and was awarded the title Khan Dauran. Under Mughal control, the Daulatabad fort thereafter acted as a grain warehouse supplying Mughal troops headed towards the south of the Indian subcontinent. It served as the main headquarters of the Mughals in the Deccan, until Aurangzeb shifted the headquarters to Aurangabad in 1653.

However, resistance in the region continued. In 1634, Shahji propped up a young prince from the Nizam Shahi household as ruler, styling him Murtaza Nizam Shah III. Shahji fought in this puppet ruler's name, contesting the Mughal hold over the regions formerly under the Ahmadnagar Sultanate. Mughal authority over Ahmednagar was only fully consolidated after 1636, when Shah Jahan established treaties with the Sultanate of Bijapur and Sultanate of Golconda that cut off Shahji's military support. These treaties resulted in peace for the Deccan region over the next two decades, resolving the extended 'Deccan crisis' of Shah Jahan's reign.
