= Pashto grammar =

Grammar of the Pashto language

Pashto is an S-O-V language with split ergativity. Adjectives come before nouns. Nouns and adjectives are inflected for gender (masc./fem.), number (sing./plur.), and case (direct, oblique, ablative and vocative). The verb system is very intricate with the following tenses: Present; simple past; past progressive; present perfect; and past perfect. In any of the past tenses (simple past, past progressive, present perfect, past perfect), Pashto is an ergative language; i.e., transitive verbs in any of the past tenses agree with the object of the sentence. The dialects show some non-standard grammatical features, some of which are archaisms or descendants of old forms.

In the following article stress is represented by the following markers over vowels: ә́, á, ā́, ú, ó, í and é.

== Pronouns ==
- Note: هغه as a demonstrative pronoun (that) has initial stress [háğa] whereas the personal pronoun (he, she, it) has final stress [hağá].

=== Personal pronouns ===
Person & Number				English	Direct	Indirect
1st person	Singular			I	زه za	ما ma
1st person	Plural			we	موږ muzh مونږ mung/mang (in Peshawari/ Northern Dialect)	ما ma
2nd person	Singular			you (sing.)	ته ta	تا taa
2nd person	Plural			you (plur.)	تاسو تاسې taaso/taase	تا taa
3rd person	Visible	Singular	Masc.	he	دی day/(Da in Peshawari /Northern Dialect)	ده da
3rd person	Visible	Singular	Fem.	she	دا daa	دې de
3rd person	Visible	Plural		they	دوی doi/(Dwi in Peshawari Dialect) دای dai (Northern dialect)	دوی doi/Dwi/dai
3rd person	Invisible	Singular	Masc.	he (invis.)	هغه haghā	هغہ hagha
3rd person	Invisible	Singular	Fem.	she (invis.)	هغه haghā	هغې haghé
3rd person	Invisible	Plural		they (invis.)	هغوی haghui/(haghwi in Peshawari Dialect)	هغوی haghui/haghwi

=== Demonstrative pronouns ===
دغه dağha (this)
Direct	دغه dáğha
Indirect	دې de

هغه háğha (that)
	Singular		Plural
	Masc.	Fem.	Plural
Direct	هغه háğha		
Indirect	هغۀ háğhә	هغې háğhe	هغو háğho

=== Possessive pronouns ===
There is no plural form with nouns.

Independent forms
			Singular	Plural
1st person			زما zma	زموږ zamuzh زمونږ zamunzh/(Zmung/Zmang in Peshawari Dialect)
2nd person			ستا sta	ستاسو staaso
3rd person	Visible	Masc.	د ده da da	د دوی da doi/Dwi
3rd person	Visible	Fem.	د دې da de	د دوی da doi/Dwi
3rd person	Invisible	Masc.	د هغہ da hagha	د هغوی da haghui/Haghwi
3rd person	Invisible	Fem.	د هغې da haghe	د هغوی da haghui/Haghwi

Enclitic forms
	Singular	Plural
1st person	مې me	مو mo, mu
2nd person	دې de, di	مو mo, mu
3rd person	يې ye	

=== Interrogative pronouns ===
		who	which	which [ord. numbers] Literary	which [ord. numbers] Yusapzai	what	how many	how much	how
Direct	Masc.	څوک tsok	کوم kom	څووم tsowə́m	څويم swajə́m	څه tsə	څومره tsómra	څونه tsóna	څنګه tsə́nga
Direct	Fem.	څوک tsok	کومه kóma	څوومه tsowə́ma	څويمه swaima	څه tsə	څومره tsómra	څونه tsóna	څنګه tsə́nga
Oblique	Masc.	چا čhā	کوم kom	څووم tsowə́m	څويم swajə́m	څه tsə	څومره tsómra	څونه tsóna	څنګه tsə́nga
Oblique	Fem.	چا čhā	کومې kóme	څوومې tsowə́me	څويمې swaime	څه tsə	څومره tsómra	څونه tsóna	څنګه tsə́nga

==== Indefinite ====
- In order to distinguish sentences with indefinites from questions, یو /yaw/ 'one' may be added, to yield یو څوک /yaw ʦok/ 'someone' and یو څه /yaw ʦə/ 'something'.
- When هر /har, ar/ 'every' precedes the indefinite pronouns, the combination can mean everyone [هر څوک], everything [هر څه], each one [هر یو]

== Nouns ==
=== Case and gender ===
Pashto inflects nouns into four grammatical cases: direct, oblique, ablative (also known as oblique II) and vocative. The oblique case is used as prepositional case as well as in the past tense as the subject of transitive verbs (i.e. in ergative construction), and the ablative case is used with certain prepositions and with some numerals.

There are two genders: masculine and feminine. Gender of a noun is indicated by its ending. Animate nouns' gender agrees with biological gender regardless of the ending.

Masculine Nouns		Feminine Nouns	
Ending Phoneme		Ending Phoneme	
Ends in diphthong oɪ		Ends in diphthong əi	
زوی zoy	son	هوسۍ hosә́i	deer
Ends in diphthong ɑi		Ends in e	
ځای dzā́y	place	ملګرې malgә́re	friend [female]
Ends in unstressed aɪ		Ends in unstressed a	
ګاډی gā́ḍay	car	ژبه žә́ba	tongue, language
Ends in stressed aɪ		Ends in o	
سړی saṛáy	man	پيشو pišhó	cat
Ends in stressed a [few nouns]		Ends in stressed a [most nouns]	
ګېنډه genḍá	rhino	مېله melá	a fair
Ends in ə			
ورارۀ wrārә́	brother's son		
Ends in consonant [most nouns]		Ends in consonant [few nouns]	
تنور tanúr	oven	مېچن mečhә́n	handmill
Ends in u			
څانډو tsānḍú	husband of a wife's sister		
Ends in diphthong aw		Ends in əw	
پلو paláw	side	کټو kaṭә́w	cooking pot
End in i [only for professions]		End in i [most nouns]	
دوبي dobí	washerman	بدي badí	hostility
Ends in ɑ [few nouns]		Ends in ɑ [most nouns]	
ماما māmā́	maternal uncle	رڼا raṇā́	light

Pashto has no definite article. But when necessary, definiteness may be indicated by other means such as demonstratives. Likewise, it may be contraindicated by use of the word for "one", يو; as in "يو روغتون" – "a hospital".

=== Class 1 ===
==== Masculine nouns ====
Generally, animate masculine nouns take ان -ā́n in plural, and inanimate ones take ونه -úna. Masculine nouns ending in ۀ -ә lose it when attaching the suffixes. The grammatical animacy usually corresponds with physical animacy, but there are some exceptions, like مېړۀ meṛә́ "husband" is inanimate grammatically with plural مېړونه meṛúna, and پل pul "bridge" is animate — پلان pulā́n.

The nouns ending in -i, -ā (these are always animate) or -u (these can be both animate and inanimate) take ان with -g-, -y- or -w- inserted between vowels.

Words ending in -āCә́ pattern (like وادۀ wādә́ "wedding") have short -a- in plural.

Ending in a consonant (animate)
	Singular	Plural
Direct		ان ā́n
Oblique		انو ā́no
Ablative	ه a	انو ā́no
Vocative	ه a	انو ā́no

Ending in a consonant (inanimate)
	Singular	Plural
Direct		ونه úna
Oblique		ونو úno
Ablative	ه a	ونو úno
Vocative	ه a	ونو úno

Ending in -ә́ (animate)
	Singular	Plural
Direct	ۀ ә́	ان ā́n
Oblique	ۀ ә́	انو ā́no
Ablative	ۀ ә́	انو ā́no
Vocative	ۀ ә́	انو ā́no

Ending in -ә́ (inanimate)
	Singular	Plural
Direct	ۀ ә́	ونه úna
Oblique	ۀ ә́	ونو úno
Ablative	ۀ ә́	ونو úno
Vocative	ۀ ә́	ونو úno

Ending in -i
	Singular	Plural
Direct	ي i	يان yā́n
Oblique	ي i	یانو yā́no
Ablative	ي i	یانو yā́no
Vocative	ي i	یانو yā́no

Ending in -ā
	Singular	Plural 1	Plural 2
Direct	ا ā	ايان āyā́n	اګان āgā́n
Oblique	ا ā	ايانو āyā́no	اګانو āgā́no
Ablative	ا ā	ايانو āyā́no	اګانو āgā́no
Vocative	ا ā	ايانو āyā́no	اګانو āgā́no

Ending in -u
	Singular	Plural 1	Plural 2
Direct	و u	وان wā́n	ګان gā́n
Oblique	و u	وانو wā́no	ګانو gā́no
Ablative	و u	وانو wā́no	ګانو gā́no
Vocative	و u	وانو wā́no	ګانو gā́no

Examples

پلار "father"
	Singular	Plural
Direct	پلار plār	پلرونه plərunə
Oblique	پلار plār	پلرونو pləruno
Ablative	پلاره plā́ra	پلرونو pləruno
Vocative	پلاره plā́ra	پلرونو pləruno

غوږ "ear"
	Singular	Plural
Direct	غوږ ğhwəg	غوږونه ğhwəgúna
Oblique	غوږ ğhwəg	غوږونو ğhwəgúno
Ablative	غوږه ğhwə́ga	غوږونو ğhwəgúno
Vocative	غوږه ğhwə́ga	غوږونو ğhwəgúno

لېوۀ "wolf"
	Singular	Plural
Direct	لېوۀ lewә́	لېوان lewā́n
Oblique	لېوۀ lewә́	لېوانو lewā́no
Ablative	لېوۀ lewә́	لېوانو lewā́no
Vocative	لېوۀ lewә́	لېوانو lewā́no

زړۀ "heart"
	Singular	Plural
Direct	زړۀ zṛә́	زړونه zṛúna
Oblique	زړۀ zṛә́	زړونو zṛúno
Ablative	زړۀ zṛә́	زړونو zṛúno
Vocative	زړۀ zṛә́	زړونو zṛúno

وادۀ "wedding"
	Singular	Plural
Direct	وادۀ wādә́	ودونه wadúna
Oblique	وادۀ wādә́	ودونو wadúno
Ablative	وادۀ wādә́	ودونو wadúno
Vocative	وادۀ wādә́	ودونو wadúno

درزي "tailor"
	Singular	Plural
Direct	درزي darzí	درزيان darzyā́n
Oblique	درزي darzí	درزیانو darzyā́no
Ablative	درزي darzí	درزیانو darzyā́no
Vocative	درزي darzí	درزیانو darzyā́no

باچا "king"
	Singular	Plural
Direct	باچا bāčā́	باچايان bāčāyā́n
Oblique	باچا bāčā́	باچايانو bāčāyā́no
Ablative	باچا bāčā́	باچايانو bāčāyā́no
Vocative	باچا bāčā́	باچايانو bāčāyā́no

ماما "(maternal) uncle"
	Singular	Plural
Direct	ماما māmā́	ماماګان māmāgā́n
Oblique	ماما māmā́	ماماګانو māmāgā́no
Ablative	ماما māmā́	ماماګانو māmāgā́no
Vocative	ماما māmā́	ماماګانو māmāgā́no

غٙل"thife"
	Singular	Plural
Direct	غٙل ġal	غٙلان ġalā́n
Oblique	غٙل ġal	غٙلونا ġalúnā
Ablative	غٙل ġal	غٙلونا ġalúnā
Vocative	غٙل ġal	غٙلونا ġalúnā

الو "potato"
	Singular	Plural
Direct	الو alú	الوګان alugā́n
Oblique	الو alú	الوګانو alugā́no
Ablative	الو alú	الوګانو alugā́no
Vocative	الو alú	الوګانو alugā́no

==== Feminine nouns ====
Feminine nouns generally have final -a. They change it to -e in the oblique cases and direct plural and to -o in oblique plural, independently of their animacy. A few feminine nouns end in a consonant, they still take the same endings.

In Southern Pashto, the final -e is pronounced -i when unstressed. For example, the plural of سترګه stә́rga "eye" and لار lār "way" would be سترګې stә́rge and لارې lā́re in the North, but سترګي stә́rgi and لاري lā́ri in the South, while مڼه maṇá "apple" and تخته taxtá "board" would be مڼې maṇé and تختې taxté in both dialect groups.

There are also feminine nouns ending in other vowels, particularly -e (they take یانې -yā́ne in the plural) and -ā or -o (they take either ګانې -gā́ne or وې -we). In Southern Pashto they are یاني -yā́ni, ګاني -gā́ni and وي -wi (the last one is not as common as in Northern Pashto and is mostly restricted to a few nouns).

Ending in -a
	Singular	Plural
Direct	ه a	ې e
Oblique	ې e	و o
Ablative	ې e	و o
Vocative	ې e	و o

Ending in a consonant
	Singular	Plural
Direct		ې e
Oblique	ې e	و o
Ablative	ې e	و o
Vocative	ې e	و o

Ending in -e
	Singular	Plural
Direct	ې e	یانې yā́ne
Oblique	ې e	یانو yā́no
Ablative	ې e	یانو yā́no
Vocative	ې e	یانو yā́no

Ending in -ā and -o
	Singular	Plural
Direct		ګانې or وې gā́ne or we
Oblique		ګانو or وو gā́no or wo
Ablative		ګانو or وو gā́no or wo
Vocative		ګانو or وو gā́no or wo

Examples

اسپه "horse, mare"
	Singular	Plural
Direct	اسپه áspa	اسپې áspe
Oblique	اسپې áspe	اسپو áspo
Ablative	اسپې áspe	اسپو áspo
Vocative	اسپې áspe	اسپو áspo

مياشت "month"
	Singular	Plural
Direct	مياشت myā́šht	مياشتې myā́šhte
Oblique	مياشتې myā́šhte	مياشتو myā́šhto
Ablative	مياشتې myā́šhte	مياشتو myā́šhto
Vocative	مياشتې myā́šhte	مياشتو myā́šhto

خواښې "mother-in-law"
	Singular	Plural
Direct	خواښې xwā́x̌e	خواښیانې xwax̌yā́ne
Oblique	خواښې xwā́x̌e	خواښیانو xwax̌yā́no
Ablative	خواښې xwā́x̌e	خواښیانو xwax̌yā́no
Vocative	خواښې xwā́x̌e	خواښیانو xwax̌yā́no

رڼا "light"
	Singular	Plural
Direct	رڼا raṇā́	رڼاوې or رڼاګانې raṇā́we or raṇāgā́ne
Oblique	رڼا raṇā́	رڼاوو or رڼاګانو raṇā́wo or raṇāgā́no
Ablative	رڼا raṇā́	رڼاوو or رڼاګانو raṇā́wo or raṇāgā́no
Vocative	رڼا raṇā́	رڼاوو or رڼاګانو raṇā́wo or raṇāgā́no

بیزو "monkey"
	Singular	Plural
Direct	بیزو bizó	بیزوګانې or بیزووې bizogā́ne or bizówe
Oblique	بیزو bizó	بیزوګانو or بیزوو bizogā́no or bizówo
Ablative	بیزو bizó	بیزوګانو or بیزوو bizogā́no or bizówo
Vocative	بیزو bizó	بیزوګانو or بیزوو bizogā́no or bizówo

=== Class 2 ===
In class 2 there's only masculine nouns, both animate and inanimate. They are subject to various alterations inside the stems. The take -ə́ in the plural and oblique forms.

Nouns with -ú- or -ó- in the last syllable change them to -ā-. Some nouns like تنور tanúr "oven" belong to the mixed conjugation, they form their oblique forms as Class 2 nouns, but their plurals are derived according to Class 1 pattern (but the -ú/ó- may be reduced to -a- in Southern dialects or -ə- in Northern dialects). The word پالېز paléz "kitchen garden" is often cited as an example of a noun that belongs to class 2, but doesn't undergo any stem changes.

There are some animate masculine nouns ending in -á (مېلمه melma "guest", اسبه asba "(horse) shepherd", غوبه ğoba "(cow) shepherd", کوربه korba "owner of the house" etc.), they also belong to Class 2.

Monosyllabic nouns with -a- lose it and take -ə in the oblique and plural forms. There several exceptions here: غر ğar "mountain", ور war "door", ګز gaz "gaz (unit of length)", من man "man (unit of weight)", ټغر ṭağar "rug" take ونه -úna in the plural form (غرونه ğrúna, ورونه warúna/wrúna etc).

Nouns with -á- in the last syllable change it to -ə́-. Most of them are mixed in their conjugation: they can take (or not take) -ā́n or -úna in the plural form. A lot of inanimate nouns in this class can take both suffixes. The only exception here is سخر sxar "stone", which is always sxə́r in plural. This subclass also contains words suffixed with ګر, ور, ن, زن.

With -ú/ó-
	Singular	Plural
Direct	úC, óC	āCə́
Oblique	āCə́	aCó
Ablative	úCa, óCa	aCó
Vocative	úCa, óCa	aCó

Mixed
	Singular	Plural
Direct	úC, óC	uCúna, oCúna or əCúna
Oblique	uCə́, óCə́	uCúno, oCúno or əCúno
Ablative	úCa, óCa	uCúno, oCúno or əCúno
Vocative	úCa, óCa	uCúno, oCúno or əCúno

Examples

پښتون "Pashtun"
	Singular	Plural
Direct	پښتون pəx̌tún	پښتانه pəx̌tānə́
Oblique	پښتانه pəx̌tānə́	پښتنو pəx̌tanó
Ablative	پښتونه pəx̌túna	پښتنو pəx̌tanó
Vocative	پښتونه pəx̌túna	پښتنو pəx̌tanó

شپون "shepherd"
	Singular	Plural
Direct	شپون špún	ښپانۀ špānə́
Oblique	ښپانۀ špānə́	شپنو španó
Ablative	شپونه špúna	شپنو španó
Vocative	شپونه špúna	شپنو španó

سکور "coal"
	Singular	Plural
Direct	سکور skór	سکارۀ skārə́
Oblique	سکارۀ skārə́	سکرو skaró
Ablative	سکوره skóra	سکرو skaró
Vocative	سکوره skóra	سکرو skaró

تنور "oven"
	Singular	Plural
Direct	تنور tanúr	تنرونه or تنورونه tanərúna or tanurúna
Oblique	تناره tanārə́	تنرونو or تنورونو tanərúno or tanurúno
Ablative	تنوره tanúra	تنرونو or تنورونو tanərúno or tanurúno
Vocative	تنوره tanúra	تنرونو or تنورونو tanərúno or tanurúno

تول "weight"
	Singular	Plural
Direct	تول tol	تولونه tolúna
Oblique	تالۀ tālə́	تولونو tolúno
Ablative	توله tóla	تولونو tolúno
Vocative	توله tóla	تولونو tolúno

مېلمه "guest"
	Singular	Plural
Direct	مېلمه melmá	مېلمانه or مېلمه melmānə́ or melmə́
Oblique	مېلمانه or مېلمه melmānə́ or melmə́	مېلمنو or مېلمو melmanó or melmó
Ablative	مېلمه melmá	مېلمنو or مېلمو melmanó or melmó
Vocative	مېلمه melmá	مېلمنو or مېلمو melmanó or melmó

غل "thief"
	Singular	Plural
Direct	غل ğal	غله ğlə
Oblique	غله ğlə	غلو ğlo
Ablative	غله ğhála	غلو ğlo
Vocative	غله ğhála	غلو ğlo

غر "mountain" (exception)
	Singular	Plural
Direct	غر ğhar	غرونه or (rare) غرۀ ğhrúna or ğhrə
Oblique	غر ğhar	غرونو ğhrúno
Ablative	غره ğhára ğhrə	غرونو ğhrúno
Vocative	غره ğhára ğhrə	غرونو ğhrúno

دښمن "enemy"
	Singular	Plural
Direct	دښمن dux̌mán	دښمن or دښمنان dux̌mə́n or dux̌mənā́n
Oblique	دښمن dux̌mə́n	دښمنو or دښمنانو dux̌mə́no or dux̌mənā́no
Ablative	دښمنه dux̌mána	دښمنو or دښمنانو dux̌mə́no or dux̌mənā́no
Vocative	دښمنه dux̌mána	دښمنو or دښمنانو dux̌mə́no or dux̌mənā́no

پالېز "kitchen garden"
	Singular	Plural
Direct	پالېز paléz	پلېزونه palezúna
Oblique	پالېزۀ or پالېز palezə́ or paléz	پلېزونو palezúno
Ablative	پلېزه paléza	پلېزونو palezúno
Vocative	پلېزه paléza	پلېزونو palezúno

=== Class 3 ===
Nouns in Class 3 are related to adjectives ending in -ay, -əy, -e.

Masculine -áy (note the stress) nouns, especially if animate, sometimes have alternative plurals in -yā́n. Its usage is somewhat dialect-dependent, they aren't as common in Southern Pashto.

Among feminine -əy nouns, even inanimate ones can take یانې or ګانې, they also can stay unchanged in the plural. Some abstract nouns suffixed with ي -i (such as دوستي "friendship", چلاکي "trickiness", ګرمي "heatness" etc.) also belong here.

Ending in -ay (masculine)
	Singular	Plural 1	Plural 2
Direct	ی ay	ي i	يان yā́n
Oblique	ي í	و or یو o or әyo/iyo	يانو yā́no
Ablative	یه aya	و or یو o or әyo/iyo	يانو yā́no
Vocative	یه aya	و or یو o or әyo/iyo	يانو yā́no

Ending in -e (feminine)
	Singular	Plural
Direct	ې e	ې e
Oblique	ې e	و or یو o or әyo/iyo
Ablative	ې e	و or یو o or әyo/iyo
Vocative	ې e	و or یو o or әyo/iyo

Ending in -əy (feminine)
	Singular	Plural 1	Plural 2	Plural 3
Direct	ۍ, ي ə́y, i	ۍ ə́y	یانې yā́ne	ګانې gā́ne
Oblique	ۍ, ي ə́y, i	و o	یانو yā́no	ګانو gā́no
Ablative	ۍ, ي ə́y, i	و o	یانو yā́no	ګانو gā́no
Vocative	ۍ, ي ə́y, i	و o	یانو yā́no	ګانو gā́no

Examples

سپی "dog"
	Singular	Plural
Direct	سپی spáy	سپي or سپیان spí or spiyā́n
Oblique	سپي spí	سپو or سپیو or سپیانو spó or spío or spiyā́no
Ablative	سپیه spáya	سپو or سپیو or سپیانو spó or spío or spiyā́no
Vocative	سپیه spáya	سپو or سپیو or سپیانو spó or spío or spiyā́no

سپۍ "she-dog"
	Singular	Plural
Direct	سپۍ spə́i	سپۍ or سپیانې or سپۍګانې spə́y or spə́iyā́ne or spə́igā́ne
Oblique	سپۍ spə́i	سپیو or سپیانو or سپۍګانو spə́yo or spə́iyā́no or spə́igā́no
Ablative	سپۍ spə́i	سپیو or سپیانو or سپۍګانو spə́yo or spə́iyā́no or spə́igā́no
Vocative	سپۍ spə́i	سپیو or سپیانو or سپۍګانو spə́yo or spə́iyā́no or spə́igā́no

ملګری "male friend"
	Singular	Plural
Direct	ملګری malgə́ray	ملګري malgə́ri
Oblique	ملګري malgə́ri	ملګرو or ملګریو malgə́ro or malgə́ryo
Ablative	ملګریه malgə́rya	ملګرو or ملګریو malgə́ro or malgə́ryo
Vocative	ملګریه malgə́rya	ملګرو or ملګریو malgə́ro or malgə́ryo

ملګرې "female friend"
	Singular	Plural
Direct	ملګرې malgə́re	ملګرې malgə́re
Oblique	ملګرې malgə́re	ملګرو or ملګریو malgə́ro or malgə́ryo
Ablative	ملګرې malgə́re	ملګرو or ملګریو malgə́ro or malgə́ryo
Vocative	ملګرې malgə́re	ملګرو or ملګریو malgə́ro or malgə́ryo

=== Uncountable nouns ===
They don't have plural forms. They take و -o in the oblique and ablative forms.

Feminine Examples include اوړه [oṛә́ – flour], اوبه [obә́ -water], پۍ [pə́i – milk] etc.

Example: اوبه – water

	Singular	Plural
Direct	اوبه obә́	
Oblique	اوبو obó	
Ablative	اوبو obó	
Vocative	اوبو obó	

Example: پۍ – milk

	Singular	Plural
Direct	پۍ pə́i	
Oblique	پيو pə́io	
Ablative	پيو pə́io	
Vocative	پيو pə́io	

Masculine Examples include: ږدن [ẓ̌dәn -sorghum], دال [dāl -lentils], شراب [šarā́b – alcohol]

Example: دال – lentils

	Singular	Plural
Direct	دال dāl	
Oblique	دالو dā́lo	
Ablative	دالو dā́lo	
Vocative	داله dā́la	

=== Irregular nouns ===
These are limited to nouns denoting kinship.

Feminine – "or" stem These include:

مور /mor/ 'mother'; plural stem /máynd-/

خور /xor/ 'sister'; plural stem /xwáynd-/

ترور /tror/ 'paternal aunt'; plural stem /tráynd-/

نګور /ngor/ 'daughter-in-law'; plural stem /ngáynd-/

Example:

	Singular	Plural
Direct	مور mor	مېندې máynde
Oblique	مور mor	مېندو máyndo
Ablative	مورې móre	مېندو máyndo
Vocative	مورې móre	مېندو máyndo

Brother and daughter ورور= brother takes وڼه in direct plural

	Singular	Plural
Direct	ورور wror	وروڼه wrúṇa
Oblique	ورور wror	وروڼو wrúṇo
Ablative	وروره wrorá	وروڼو wrúṇo
Vocative	وروره wrorá	وروڼو wrúṇo

لور= daughter takes وڼې in direct plural

	Singular	Plural
Direct	لور lur	لوڼې lúṇe
Oblique	لور lur	لوڼو lúṇo
Ablative	لورې lúre	لوڼو lúṇo
Vocative	لورې lúre	لوڼو lúṇo

Son

	Singular	Plural
Direct	زوی zoy	زامن zāmə́n
Oblique	زوی zoy	زامنو zāmə́no
Ablative	زویه zoya	زامنو zāmə́no
Vocative	زویه zoya	زامنو zāmə́no

== Adjectives ==
An adjective is called stāynúm in Pashto [ستاينوم]. The adjectives or stāynumúna agree with the nouns they modify in gender, number, and case.

			Class 1	Class 2		Class 3	
			Category 1	Category 2	Category 3	Category 4	Category 5
Masculine	Singular	Direct	-			-ay	
Masculine	Singular	Oblique II	-a			-aya	-i
Masculine	Singular	Vocative	-a			-aya	-e
Masculine	Singular	Oblique	-	-ə		-i	
Masculine	Plural	Direct	-	-ə		-i	
Masculine	Plural	Oblique/Vocative	-o			-io/-o	-yo/-o
Feminine	Singular	Direct	-a			-əy	-e
Feminine	Singular	Oblique II	-a			-əy	-e
Feminine	Singular	Vocative	-e			-əy	-e
Feminine	Singular	Oblique I	-e			-əy	-e
Feminine	Plural	Direct	-e			-əy	-e
Feminine	Plural	Oblique/Vocative	-o			-əyo/-o	-yo/-o

Notes:

- In the plural, both obliques and the vocative merge into a single form.
- Singular Oblique I and plural Direct always merge into a single form.
- The above two conditions mean that there can be at most five distinct forms for masculine adjectives (but in fact, no class distinguishes more than four).
- For feminine adjectives, singular Oblique I and Vocative merge, while singular Direct and Oblique II merge; combined with mergers noted previously, there can be at most three distinct forms for feminine adjectives.
- Categories 2 and 3 have stem and stress alternations among different cases. Category 3 has a basic distinction between the masculine singular Direct, Oblique II and Vocative, with stem stress, and all other forms, with a (sometimes) different stem and with ending stress (e.g. masc. trīx, fem. traxá "bitter"; masc. sūr, fem. srá "red"; masc. sōṛ, fem. saṛá "cold"; fem. raṇā "light" with only one stem). Category 2 has the same stress alternation, but has three distinct stems, with stressed stem vowel 'o' or 'u' in masculine singular Direct, Oblique II and Vocative, unstressed stem vowel 'ā' in masculine singular Oblique I and plural Direct, and unstressed stem vowel 'a' in all other forms (e.g. masc. sing. pōx, masc. plur. pāxǝ́, fem. paxá "ripe, cooked").

=== Class 1 ===
==== Case-marking suffixes ====
Class I adjectives are consonant-final in their citation form and keep the stress on the final syllable of the stem.

	Masculine		Feminine	
	Singular	Plural	Singular	Plural
Direct			ه a	ې e
Oblique		و o	ې e	و o
Ablative	ه a		ې e	و o
Vocative	ه a		ې e	و o

==== Stem allomorphy ====
In the Southern dialects, Class I adjectives with certain stem shapes will undergo mutation either:

1. Vowel harmony

or

1. Centralization

In other dialects these vowels do not mutate.

===== Vowel harmony =====
Class I adjectives with the stressed stem vowel /ə́/ (Southern), such as دنګ /dəng/ 'tall', undergo regressive harmony in the feminine direct plural and in both oblique plural forms—when the suffix vowel is /o/.

===== Centralization =====
Class I adjectives for which the last syllable in the masculine direct singular form is ور /‑wár/, ګر /‑gár/, جن /‑ján/, or م ن /‑mán/, as well as ordinal numbers ending in م /‑ám/, undergo a different vowel alternation: the vowel /á/ of the final syllable centralizes to /ə́/ in feminine non-direct singulars and in all plural forms, irrespective of gender.

==== Class I forms with stem allomorphy ====
Example 1 = سپک (light – in weight)

	Masculine		Feminine	
	Singular	Plural	Singular	Plural
Direct	سپک spak spək (Southern)	سپک spak spək (Southern)	سپکه spáka spə́ka (Southern)	سپکې spáke سپکي spə́ki (Southern)
Oblique	سپک spak spək (Southern)	سپکو spáko spə́ko (Southern) spóko (Southern)	سپکې spáke سپکي spə́ki (Southern)	سپکو spáko spə́ko (Southern) spóko (Southern)
Ablative	سپکه spáka spə́ka (Southern)	سپکو spáko spə́ko (Southern) spóko (Southern)	سپکې spáke سپکي spə́ki (Southern)	سپکو spáko spə́ko (Southern) spóko (Southern)
Vocative	سپکه spáka spə́ka (Southern)	سپکو spáko spə́ko (Southern) spóko (Southern)	سپکې spáke سپکي spə́ki (Southern)	سپکو spáko spə́ko (Southern) spóko (Southern)

The paradigm for the adjective سپک /spək/ 'light' in above shows the Southern dialect's Vowel harmony rule.

Example 2 = زړور (brave)

	Masculine		Feminine	
	Singular	Plural	Singular	Plural
Direct	زړور zṛawár	زړور zṛawár zṛawə́r (Southern)	زړوره zṛawára	زړورې zṛawáre زړوري zṛawə́ri (Southern)
Oblique	زړور zṛawár	زړورو zṛawáro zṛawə́ro (Southern)	زړورې zṛawáre زړوري zṛawə́ri (Southern)	زړورو zṛawáro zṛawə́ro (Southern)
Ablative	زړوره zṛawár	زړورو zṛawáro zṛawə́ro (Southern)	زړورې zṛawáre زړوري zṛawə́ri (Southern)	زړورو zṛawáro zṛawə́ro (Southern)
Vocative	زړوره zṛawár	زړورو zṛawáro zṛawə́ro (Southern)	زړورې zṛawáre زړوري zṛawə́ri (Southern)	زړورو zṛawáro zṛawə́ro (Southern)

The paradigm for the adjective زړور /zṛawár/ 'brave' illustrates centralization rule for the Southern dialect.

==== Animacy ====
When modifying animate nouns, some Class I adjectives may take the animate plural suffixes of Class I nouns example:

Məʃarɑn wruɳa
'Elder brothers'

=== Class 2 ===
Class 2 adjectives can end in either a consonant or a stressed schwa ( ه /‑ə́/). Except for the masculine singular ablative and vocative suffixes, the suffixes of Class II are inherently stressed. These stressed suffixes are the chief difference between Class 1 and Class 2, although there are a few differences in suffix shape as well. Whether a consonant-final adjective belongs to Class 1 (stem-stressed) or Class II (suffix-stressed) is a property of the lexeme and is not predictable.

==== Case-marking suffixes ====
	Masculine		Feminine	
	Singular	Plural	Singular	Plural
Direct	-Ø	ۀ ə́	ه á	ې é
Oblique	ۀ ə́	و ó	ې é	و ó
Ablative	ه –	و ó	ې é	و ó
Vocative	ه –	و ó	ې é	و ó

==== Stem allomorphy ====
Some Class2 adjectives undergo stem allomorphy processes upon inflection, all of them stress-conditioned. The first, Syncope I, affects the final vowels of /ə́/-final Class 2 adjectives; the rest affect the stem vowels of consonant-final Class 2 adjectives (which either lower or delete when unstressed). Lowering affects only back vowels, but not all of them. It is not possible to predict which rule, Back vowel lowering or Syncope II, applies to a given consonant-final adjective. The rules are:

1. Syncope I
2. Back vowel lowering
3. Monophthongization
4. Lengthening
5. Syncope II
6. Epenthesis

===== Syncope I =====
- V2 → Ø/ V́1_
- V́1 → Ø/ _V́2

If suffixation results in two adjacent vowels and only one is stressed, the unstressed vowel deletes. If both are stressed, the first vowel deletes. This rule applies to vowel-final adjectives.

Examole: Vowel-final adjectives that end in stressed ۀ /‑ə́/

	Masculine		Feminine	
	Singular	Plural	Singular	Plural
Direct	تېرۀ terə́	تېرۀ terə́	تېره terá	تېرې teré
Oblique	تېرۀ terə́	تېرو teró	تېرې teré	تېرو teró
Ablative	تېرۀ terə́	تېرو teró	تېرې teré	تېرو teró
Vocative	تېرۀ terə́	تېرو teró	تېرې teré	تېرو teró

Vowel-final adjectives that end stressed ه /‑ə́/ in their citation form include تېره /terə/́ 'sharp'. These can be reliably identified from this citation form as belonging to Class 2; no other class has adjectives ending in /-ə́/. The final stem-vowel of these adjectives undergoes one or other of the morphophonemic rules of Syncope I.

===== Back vowel lowering =====
- V-stress] [+back, → V[-high]/ C_

Inmost Class 2 consonant-final adjectives with non-initial back vowels, و /o/, /u/ lowers to /a/ when unstressed.

	Masculine		Feminine	
	Singular	Plural	Singular	Plural
Direct	پوخ pox	پاخۀ pāxə́	پخه paxá	پخې paxé
Oblique	پاخۀ pāxə́	پخو paxó	پخې paxé	پخو paxó
Ablative	پوخه póxa	پخو paxó	پخې paxé	پخو paxó
Vocative	پوخه póxa	پخو paxó	پخې paxé	پخو paxó

	Masculine		Feminine	
	Singular	Plural	Singular	Plural
Direct	ړوند ṛund	ړاندۀ ṛāndə́	ړنده ṛandá	ړندې ṛandé
Oblique	ړاندۀ ṛāndə́	ړندو ṛandó	ړندې ṛandé	ړندو ṛandó
Ablative	ړوند ṛúnda	ړندو ṛandó	ړندې ṛandé	ړندو ṛandó
Vocative	ړوند ṛúnda	ړندو ṛandó	ړندې ṛandé	ړندو ṛandó

In most consonant-final adjectives where the stem vowel is a back vowel, و /o/, /u/, it will undergo vowel lowering in unstressed position, followed by lengthening when the next syllable contains /ə́/ such as for the words, پو خ /pox/ 'cooked, ripe' and ړوند /ṛund/ 'blind', illustrated above.

===== Monophthongization =====
- a[+stress]w → V-high] [+back,
- wa[+stress] → V-high] [+back,

In adjectives with /aw/ or /wa/ in the stem [usually seen in the feminine tense], those sequences simplify to /o/ when stressed.

	Masculine		Feminine	
	Singular	Plural	Singular	Plural
Direct	تود tod	تاودۀ tāwdə́	توده tawdá	تودې tawdé
Oblique	تاودۀ tāwdə́	تودو tawdó	تودې tawdé	تودو tawdó
Ablative	توده tóda	تودو tawdó	تودې tawdé	تودو tawdó
Vocative	توده tóda	تودو tawdó	تودې tawdé	تودو tawdó

Back vowel breaking: تود /tod/ 'hot'; stem = /tawd/.

===== Lengthening =====
- a → ā /_(C)Cə́

Short /a/ lengthens to long /ā/ when the syllable following it contains /ə́/. This rule affects those adjectives that undergo back vowel lowering, such as for پاخۀ → پوخ and ړاندۀ → ړوند and those that undergo monophthongization, such as تاودۀ → تود.

===== Lengthening =====
- V[-stress] → Ø

In a few consonant-final adjectives the stem vowel is deleted when not stressed.

Example = سور /sur/ – red

	Masculine		Feminine	
	Singular	Plural	Singular	Plural
Direct	سور sur	سرۀ srə	سره sra	سرې sre
Oblique	سرۀ srə	سرو sro	سرې sre	سرو sro
Ablative	سوره súra	سرو sro	سرې sre	سرو sro
Vocative	سوره súra	سرو sro	سرې sre	سرو sro

===== Epenthesis =====
- Ø → a/C_CC or CC_C

If syncope results in a triple consonant cluster, an /a/ might be inserted after the first or second consonant.

=== Class 3 ===
These adjectives end in the diphthong participial suffix, ی /‑ay/, in the masculine direct singular form/. This suffix may be stressed or unstressed.

==== Case-marking suffixes ====
Stressed

	Masculine		Feminine	
	Singular	Plural	Singular	Plural
Direct	ی áy	ي í	ۍ ə́i	ۍ ə́i
Oblique	ي í	و ó یو ə́yo/ío	ۍ ə́i	و ó یو ə́yo/ío
Ablative	یه áya	و ó یو ə́yo/ío	ۍ ə́i	و ó یو ə́yo/ío
Vocative	یه áya	و ó یو ə́yo/ío	ۍ ə́i	و ó یو ə́yo/ío

Unstressed

	Masculine		Feminine	
	Singular	Plural	Singular	Plural
Direct	ی ay	ي i	ې e	ې e
Oblique	ي i	و o	ې e	و o
Ablative	ي i	و o	ې e	و o
Vocative	یه ya	و o	ې e	و o

==== Stressed ====
Example = زلمی (young/youth – the ی is stressed)

	Masculine		Feminine	
	Singular	Plural	Singular	Plural
Direct	زلمی zalmá y	زلمي zalmí	زلمۍ zalmə́i	زلمۍ zalmə́i
Oblique	زلمي zalmí	زلمو zalmó زلمیو zalmío (Southern) zalmə́yo (Northern)	زلمۍ zalmə́i	زلمو zalmó زلمیو zalmío (Southern) zalmə́yo (Northern)
Ablative	زلمي zalmí	زلمو zalmó زلمیو zalmío (Southern) zalmə́yo (Northern)	زلمۍ zalmə́i	زلمو zalmó زلمیو zalmío (Southern) zalmə́yo (Northern)
Vocative	زلمیه zalmáya	زلمو zalmó زلمیو zalmío (Southern) zalmə́yo (Northern)	زلمۍ zalmə́i	زلمو zalmó زلمیو zalmío (Southern) zalmə́yo (Northern)

==== Unstressed ====
Example = سوی (burnt- the ی is unstressed)

	Masculine		Feminine	
	Singular	Plural	Singular	Plural
Direct	سوی sə́way sə́wəy (South Western) sə́we (North Eastern)	سوي sə́wi	سوې sə́we	سوې sə́we
Oblique	سوي sə́wi	سویو sə́wyo (Northern) سوو sə́wo	سویې sə́wye (Northern) سوې sə́we	سویو sə́wyo (Northern) سوو sə́wo
Ablative	سوي sə́wi	سویو sə́wyo (Northern) سوو sə́wo	سویې sə́wye (Northern) سوې sə́we	سویو sə́wyo (Northern) سوو sə́wo
Vocative	سویه(Northern) sə́way سوې(Southern) sə́we	سوو sə́wo	سوې sə́we	سوو sə́wo

=== Class 4 ===
This the "non-declining" class – these do not decline. These adjectives are generally borrowed from other languages. They do not have masculine-feminine or singular-plural distinction.

But some speakers use the oblique suffixes و /‑o/, وو /‑wo/ on these adjectives in the plural oblique, ablative and vocative cases.

Example = شمالي (Persian-Arabic borrowing)

	Masculine		Feminine	
	Singular	Plural	Singular	Plural
Direct	شمالي šamālí			
Oblique	شمالي šamālí			
Ablative	شمالي šamālí			
Vocative	شمالي šamālí			

Example = شمالي (Southern Dialect)

	Masculine		Feminine	
	Singular	Plural	Singular	Plural
Direct	شمالي šamālí			
Oblique	شمالي šamālí	شمالو šamāló	شمالي šumālí	شمالو šamāló
Ablative	شمالي šamālí	شمالو šamāló	شمالي šumālí	شمالو šamāló
Vocative	شمالي šamālí	شمالو šamāló	شمالي šumālí	شمالو šamāló

== Derivational affixes ==
Pashto utilities morphological derivation: there is an addition to the base form or stem of a word in order to modify its meaning [not grammatical function like verbal suffixes].

=== Prefixes ===
These are attached at the beginning of words. Here is a list of the most common ones:

Prefix	Meaning
نا	a negative prefix to nouns or particles having the same meaning as English "un, in, dis, non" etc.
بې	this means "without". When prefixed to words it is equivalent to the English "dis, less" etc. Considered a preposition.
بيا	this means again. When prefixed to words it is equivalent to English "re"
هم	this means same, equivalent. When prefixed with the word it is equivalent to the English "co and homo"
ګڼ	this means crowded and numerous. When prefixed with the word it is equivalent to the English "multi"
دوه	this means two. When prefixed with the word it is equivalent to the English "bi"

A list of examples:

	Word	English meaning	Prefixed word	English meaning
نا nā	وړ waṛ	suitable	ناوړ nāwáṛ	unsuitable
بې be	کور kor	home	بې کوره be kóra [کور in the ablative case]	homeless
بيا byā	جوړول joṛawә́l	to make	بيا جوړول byā joṛawә́l	to remake
هم ham	[زولی [نارينه]، زولې [ښځينه zólay, zóle	age [classical Pashto]	همزولی، همزولې hamzólay, hamzól	coeval
ګڼ gaṇ	هېواديز hewādíz	national	ګڼ هېواديز gaṇhewādíz	multinational
دوه dwa	اړخيز aṛxíz	aṛx= side, íz = adjective forming suffix	دوه اړخيز dwa aṛxíz	bilateral

=== Suffixes ===
These are attached at the end of a word. Here is a list of the most common ones:

Prefix	Meaning
توب	this is affixed to nouns and adjectives to form masculine concept/abstract nouns.
تیا	this is affixed to nouns and adjectives to form feminine concept/abstract nouns.
ي	this is affixed to noun to make adjectives.
ي	a suffix also used to create nouns of profession.
يز [masculine] يزه [feminine]	adjectival suffix. Used to make adjectives from nouns. Becomes "yiz" if preceded by a vowel e.g. سوله=سوله ييز
من	suffix that forms nouns and adjectives that mean possessing a quality or object
جن	adjective-forming suffix; having the quality of the noun e.g. چنجن [worm-eaten; stubbornly picky]
ين	an adjective-forming suffix applied to nouns denoting a material
ور	an adjective forming suffix to show endowment/possession.
م	forms ordinal number names from cardinals
ښت	this is affixed to adjectives (including verbal adjectives) to show a state of being
ګلوي	this is affixed to nouns to form feminine concept/abstract nouns mostly to do with association e.g. پیژند ګلوي, پلار ګلوي etc.
والی	this is affixed to nouns and adjectives to form masculine concept/abstract nouns.
ولي	this is affixed to nouns and adjectives to form feminine concept/abstract nouns.
ځی	this makes nouns denoting place of the action
نه	this is the most common suffix used to makes nouns from verb. The new suffixed word has feminine gender.
ون	less frequently used than نه. This also creates nouns from verbs
اک	this is used to make only two nouns [خوراک and څښاک] denoting consumable noun. Like Japanese particle もの.
تون	used to create nouns of place. Meaning the "(main) place of"
پال [masculine] پاله [feminine]	means someone is the cherisher/nourisher of the word attached. It is like Persian پرست but unlike پرست only used for agentive nouns not as an adjective.
پالنه	makes concept/abstract nouns showing the root's cherishing/fostering. Like Persian پرستي
واکي	makes nouns which signify "mastery of", "rule of" or "endowment with in quality" with the root word. Related to word واک [authority].
وال	makes nouns showing that noun is a resident of that place, is engaged in the activity indicated in the root word, possessor of the root word. Like English suffix "er", "or" and "ist".
واله	makes nouns denoting ownership
ګر	used to form an actor noun. Denoting maker, doer, worker etc. of the root.
چي	an agent-noun suffix borrowed from Ottoman Turkish. Only used with borrowed words.
ګوټی	a diminutive suffix. Example مېز [table] – مېزګوټی [small table].
وزمه	suffix to indicate something is like/similar to the root word but not that word. Also used to denote shades of colour.
نی	suffix affixed to words having to do with time and location
ی	suffix affixed to place names to form a masculine noun living or found in that place
ۍ	suffix affixed to place names to form a feminine noun living or found in that place
ګنۍ	suffix for nouns expressing kinship/relationships
وړ [masculine] وړه [feminine]	this is used exactly as the English -able. Forms adjectives meaning fit/able to be done or suitable to.
يالی [masculine] يالۍ [feminine]	forms adjectives from nouns. The adjective shows a quality that can be possessed.
غاړی [masculine] غاړې [feminine]	forms actor/agent nouns that have to do with an art/skill [example: لوبغاړی, سندرغاړی]. Also used to create adjective/nouns related to the throat [غاړه] such as بوږغاړی [harsh sounding]
چک	an adjectival suffix showing that the new word is "somewhat" like the root word. Similar to "ish" suffix in English.
ډله	this means group. It can be used as suffix to denote team, group, company etc.
هار	according to Z. A. Pashtoon: "suffix used to form onomatopoeic words indicating the repetition or intensification of a sound". according to H. G. Raverty: a suffix "affixed to nouns signifying sound of any kind, in forming the plural".

A list of examples:

	Word	English meaning	Prefixed word	English meaning
توب tob	بربنډ barbə́nḍ	nude	بربنډتوب barbənḍtób	nudeness/nudity
تیا tyā	روغ roğh	healthy	روغتيا roğhtyā́	health
ي i	ولس (w)ulə́s	nation	ولسي (w) uləsí	national
ي i	ترکاڼ tarkā́ṇ	carpenter	ترکاڼي tarkāṇí	carpentry
يز/يزه iz/iza	لمر lmar	sun	لمريز lmaríz لمريزه lmaríza	solar
يز/يزه yiz/yiza	وټه wáṭa	economy	وټه ييز waṭayíz وټه ييزه waṭayíza	economic
من man	لانجه lānjá	problem	لانجمن lānjamán lānjamə́n	problematic
جن jən	کرکه krә́ka	repugnance	کرکجن krәkjә́n	someone who is repugnant to something
ين in	زر zar	gold	زرين zarín	golden
ور war	ګټه gáṭa	profit	ګټور gaṭawár	advantageous
م am/əm	اووه uwə́	seven	اووم uwə́m	seventh
ښت əx̌t	جوړ joṛ	made/built	جوړښت joṛə́x̌t	structure
ګلوي galwi	پلار plār	father	پلارګلوي plār	paternity
والی wālay	اوږد uẓ̌d	long	اوږدوالی uẓ̌dwā́lay	length/height
ولي wali	ورور wror	brother	ورورولي wrorwalí	brotherhood
ځی dzay	ښوول x̌owə́l	to teach	ښونځی x̌owə́ndzay	school
نه əna	غوښتل ğox̌tə́l	to demand	غوښتنه ğox̌tə́na	demand
ون un	بدلول badlawə́l	to change	بدلون badlún	change
اک āk	څښل tsx̌ə́l خوړل xwaṛə́l	to drink to eat	څښاک tsx̌āk خوراک xwaṛā́k	drink food
تون tun	پوهنه pohə́na	knowledge	پوهنتون pohəntún	university
پال/پاله pal/pāla	مېلمه melmá	guest	مېلمه پال melmapā́l مېلمه پاله melmapā́la	host
پالنه pālana	مېلمه melmá	guest	مېلمه پالنه melmapālə́na	hospitality
واکي wāki	پلار plār	father	پلارواکي plārwākí	patriarchy
وال wāl	ليک lik	writing	ليکوال likwā́l	writer
واله' wālə	غنم ğhanə́m	wheat	غنم واله ğhanəmwālə	wheat-merchant
ګر gər	کوډه kóḍa	magic	کوډګر koḍgə́r koḍgár	magician
چي chi	توپ top	cannon	توپچي topčí	cannoneer
ګوټی goṭay	کتاب kitā́b	book	کتاب ګوټی kitābgóṭay	booklet
وزمه wazma	تور tor	black	تور وزمه torwázma	blackish
نی (a)náy	کال kāl	year	کالنی kālanáy	annual
ی áy	جاپان jāpā́n	Japan	جاپانی jāpānáy	a Japanese male
ۍ ə́i	جاپان jāpā́n	Japan	جاپانۍ jāpānə́i	a Japanese female
ګنۍ ganai	پلار plār مور mor	father mother	پلارګنۍ plārganə́i مورګنۍ morganə́i	paternal-family maternal-family
وړ/وړه waṛ/waṛa	خندا xandā́	laughter	خنداوړ xandāwáṛ خنداوړه xandāwáṛa	laughable
يالۍ /يالی yālay/yālə́i	ننګ nang	honor	ننګيالی nangyāláy ننګيالۍ nangyālə́i	honorable
غاړې /غاړی ğāṛay/ğāṛe	سندره sandə́ra	song	سندرغاړی sandərğā́ṛay سندرغاړې sandərğā́ṛe	singer
چک cak	سپين spin	white	سپين چک spinčák	whitish
ډله ḍala	لوب lob	root word of play	لوبډله lobḍála	team (sports)
هار hār	پړک pṛak	slap/clap	پړکهار pṛakahā́r	clapping/sounds of claps

=== Creating new words ===
Other than the recognised words above; new words can be coined by speakers through these affixes

Example:

Creating a new word process
Existing word	Existing suffix	New word
غو ğo	ييز yíz	غوييز ğoyíz
sex	adjective-forming suffix	sexual

== Infinitive ==
This is called Kaṛnúmay [کړنومی] in Pashto that is "the name of a verb". It shows an infinite action or occurrence. It is used as a noun. It acquires the gender and number of a masculine plural noun.

Formed: Past Imperfective Stem + verbal ل (ә́l)
Conjugation Class		Past Imperfective Stem	Infinitives
1st		-کېد ked- become	کېدل kedә́l {to become}
2nd		-ننوت nənawat-	ننوتل nənawatә́l {to enter}
3rd	Joined	-ښخو x̌axaw- {do bury}	ښخول x̌axawә́l {to bury}
3rd	Unjoined	{-سوچ کو} {soč kaw-} {do think}	{سوچ کول} {soč kawә́l} {to think}

Example: وکړل [past perfective tense of the transitive verb کول – "to do"] shows agreement with masculine plural object that is the infinitive وهل.

Hağúi pә xpә́lo ke wahә́l wә́kṛəl
they:DIR:3:PL on:PREP own:OBL:M:PL on:POST to-beat:PST:CONT:3:M:PL do:PST:PRF:3:PL
They have fought amongst themselves

=== Double infinitives ===
These are formed by combining two infinitives
– either by combining a simple infinitive with a prefixed infinitive.

Simple infinitive	Prefixed infinitive	Double infinitive
تلل [going]	راتلل [coming]	تلل راتلل [coming and going]
ګرځېدل [to walk/walking]	راګرځېدل [to repass]	ګرځېدل راګرځېدل [walking about]

– or by combining two simple infinitives:

Simple infinitive 1	Simple infinitive 2	Double infinitive
خوړل [eating]	څښل [drinking]	خوړل څښل [eating drinking]
وهل [beating/hitting]	ټکول [knocking]	وهل ټکول [beating]

== Verb ==
- Pashto has three tenses: Past, present and future.
- The future tense is the same as present tense with the exception of markers.
- Aspect: Pashto in every tense has perfective aspect [بشپړاړخ] and imperfective aspect [نابشپړاړخ]. The perfective aspect indicates completion of an action while the imperfective aspect indicates continuous or habitual action.
- Pashto verbs are of four categories: simple verbs, prefixed verbs, a-initial verbs and compound verbs.
- Prefixed verbs, a-initial verbs and compound verbs are separable.
- Pashto verbs can be conjugated by the bases they have.
- Present and imperative forms are formed on present bases. Past, optative, and infinitive forms are formed on past bases.
- Based on the stems they classed as either single stemmed, two stemmed or multiple stemmed
- Verbs agree in person and in number with either the objects or subjects of sentences, depending on tense and construction.
- Agreement is indicated with verbal suffixes following the verb stem which indicate person and number.

== Verbs: categories ==
=== Simple verbs ===
They are in the morpheme state.

Examples:

Infinitive	Transliteration	Meaning
تلل	tlə́l	to go
وتل	watə́l	to go out
ګرځېدل	gardzedə́l	to walk
کول	kawə́l	to do
خوړل	xwaṛә́l	to eat

=== Prefixed verbs ===
These are described below as doubly irregular.

They take the form of a derivational prefix plus a verb base.

==== Deictic prefixed verb ====
These correspond to the oblique pronominal and directionals clitics.

Prefix	Direction	Example	Example meaning
را rā	towards 1st person	راتلل rā tlә́l	to come
در dər/dar	towards 2nd person	درتلل dәr tlә́l	to go towards you
ور wər/war	towards 3rd person	ورکول wәr kawә́l	to give

==== Non-productive prefixed verbs ====
Like deictic prefixed these are subject to the same rules of stress movement to show perfective aspect, as well as to separation from the rest of the verb by negative morphemes and second-position clitics. But generally their meanings are not synchronically separable from the verbal lexeme of which they are a part of.

Prefix	Transliteration	Example	Example meaning
کښې	kxe [Northern] kṣ̌i [Southern]	کښېوتل kxewatә́l	to drop into
کې	ke [Northern] ki [Southern]	کېښودل kex̌awdә́l	to put
نن	nəna	ننوتل nənawatә́l	to enter
پورې	pore	پورې ايستل pore istә́l	to traverse
تېر	ter	تېروتل terwatә́l	to get mistaken
پرا	prā	پرانيستل prānistә́l	to open
پرې	pre	پرېوتل prewatә́l	to lie down

Example: پرېکول – to cut. The prefix [پرې] is separated from the verb stem [کول] by a second position clitic [يې]

pré ye kṛá
cut:VB:PREFIX:AOR it/he/she:3:WK cut:VB:AOR:IMP:SG
Cut it

=== a-initial verbs ===
These begin with ا /a/; but they do not include compound verbs beginning with /a/.

Examples:

Infinitive	Transliteration	Meaning
اڼول	aṇawə́l	to gather
استول	astawə́l	to send
اخيستل	axistə́l	to buy

Their syntactic behaviour resembles that of prefixed verbs: the initial /a/ can separate from the rest of the verb as though it were a prefix. Unlike prefixed verbs, a-initial verbs differ in that

they take the prefix و /wə́/ for perfective forms.

وا مې خيستل
wā́ me xistəl
buy:AOR I:SG:WK buy:PST:3PL:M
I bought them

Unlike all the verbs; they are unusual, in that their stress is variable in the imperfective aspect: it can be either be initial or non-initial. Other verbs can not have initial stress. When the /a/ is separated from the rest of the verb in the imperfective aspect it has initial stress.

Example: initial stress

ا مې خيستل
á me xistəl
buy:CONT I:SG:WK buy:PST:3PL:M
I was buying them

Example: non-initial stress

اخيستل مې
axistə́l me
buy:CONT:PST:3PL:M I:SG:WK
I was buying them

=== Compound verbs ===
There are two categories of compound verbs. There are also some exceptions to these.

==== First category ====
These are formed by adding ول [-wә́l] and ېدل [edә́l] verbal-suffixes to nouns, adjectives or adverbs. The attaching noun, adjective and adverb should not end in a vowel.

Example:

Word		Verb formed
ښخ x̌ax	adjective, singular, mas	ښخول x̌awә́l
ښخ x̌ax	buried	to bury

===== Exceptions =====
There are also exceptions to this category. Example: سوچ کول etc.

Word		Verb formed
سوچ soč	noun, singular masculine	سوچ کول soč kawә́l
سوچ soč	thought	to think

==== Second category ====
These are formed adding auxiliary verbs کول and کېدل to the noun and adjectives. The attaching noun and adjective end in a vowel.

Examples:

Word		Verb formed
ښايسته x̌āistá	adjective, feminine, class 4	ښايسته کول x̌āista kawә́l
ښايسته x̌āistá	pretty	to make pretty
ستړی stә́ṛay	noun, sing. masc., class 3	ستړی کول stəṛay kawә́l
ستړی stә́ṛay	tired	to tire

== Verbs: conjugation classes ==
These can be divided in reference to the verb categories as above:

- First Conjugation Class: Simple Verbs and A-Initial Verbs
- Second Conjugation Class: Prefixed Verbs
- Third Conjugation Class: Compound Verbs

== Verbs: bases ==
Pashto verb bases are formed according to the tense (present/past) and aspect (perfective/imperfective) of a verb.

Aspect

The perfective aspect is indicated by the stressed prefix و /wә́/ or in the case of complex verbs [prefixed verbs, a-initial and compound verbs] by stress on the prefix or complement. The imperfective aspect is indicated by the absence of و /wə/ or stress on the verb itself rather than the prefix or complement.

Tense

The present tense either by the absence of this suffix (transitives), or by the suffix ېږ /ég/ (intransitives).

For single stem verbs: the past tenses is indicated by either the suffix ل /ə́l/ (for transitive verbs) or ېد /ed(ə́l)/ (for intransitives).

For two or more stemmed verbs: the past tense is indicated by stem allomorphy.

Bases

Therefore, the following four-fold-method to differentianate of bases:

1. present perfective

2. present imperfective

3. past perfective

4. past impefective

Inflection

In order to make fully inflected verbs, you add either of the following to these bases:

- a verbal suffix
- an imperative or optative suffix, or
- an adjectival suffix (to form a participle)

== Verbs: Single Stems ==
These are referred to as Weak Verbs by Anna Boyle. These have one stem. From this single stem from all four bases are predictable.

=== First Conjugation Class ===
==== Transitive ====
Here is an example first conjugation class transitive verb: "to tie"

Verb	Stem	Present		Past	
Verb	Stem	Perfective	Imperfective	Perfective	Imperfective
Verb	Stem	-وتړ wә́ taṛ-	-تړ taṛ-	-وتړل wә́ taṛ әl-	-تړل taṛә́l-
تړل taṛә́l	تړ taṛ	-وتړ wә́ taṛ-	-تړ taṛ-	-وتړل wә́ taṛ әl-	-تړل taṛә́l-

Notes:

- present imperfective base = stem
- present perfective base: و /wә́/ + stem
- past imperfective base: stem+ ل /ə́l/ (suffix obligatory)
- past perfective base: و /wә́/ + stem+ ل /əl/(suffix obligatory)

==== Intransitive ====
Here is an example first conjugation class intransitive verb: "to reach"

Verb	Stem	Present		Past	
Verb	Stem	Perfective	Imperfective	Perfective	Imperfective
Verb	Stem	-ورسېږ wә́ raseẓ̌-	-رسېږ raseẓ̌-	-(ورسېد(ل wә́ rased(ә́l)-	-(رسېد(ل rásed-
رسېدل rasedә́l	رس ras	-ورسېږ wә́ raseẓ̌-	-رسېږ raseẓ̌-	-(ورسېد(ل wә́ rased(ә́l)-	-(رسېد(ل rásed-

Notes:

- present imperfective base: stem+ ېږ /eg/
- present perfective base: و /wә́/ + stem+ ېږ /eg/
- past imperfective base: stem + ېد /ed/ (+ ل /ə́l/—prohibited in 3rd Person Sing. Masc; optional elsewhere)
- past perfective base: و /wә́/ + stem + ېد /ed/( + ل /əl/— prohibited in 3rd Person Sing. Masc; optional elsewhere)

=== Second Conjugation Class ===
In the second conjugation, perfectives are formed by a shift of stress to the existing prefix, rather than the addition of the و /wә́/ prefix.

Here is an example first conjugation class transitive verb: "to bring (to speaker)"

Verb	Stem	Present		Past	
Verb	Stem	Perfective	Imperfective	Perfective	Imperfective
Verb	Stem	-راوړ rā́ wṛ-	-راوړ rā wṛ-	-راوړل rā́ wṛә́l-	-راوړل rā wṛә́l-
راوړل rāwṛә́l	راوړ rā wṛ	-راوړ rā́ wṛ-	-راوړ rā wṛ-	-راوړل rā́ wṛә́l-	-راوړل rā wṛә́l-

Notes:

- present imperfective base = stem
- present perfective base: stressed prefix + stem
- past imperfective base: prefix + stem+ ل /ə́l/(suffix obligatory)
- past perfective base: stressed prefix + stem+ ل /ə́l/(suffix obligatory)

== Verbs: Two Stems ==
These are referred to as Strong Verbs by Anna Boyle

These have two stems: present stem and a past stem.

=== First Conjugation Class ===
The stems can either share initial sounds as in example:

a) where ل is replaced by ن in the present tense:
Verb	Present Stem	Present		Past Stem	Past	
Verb	Present Stem	Perfective	Imperfective	Past Stem	Perfective	Imperfect
وژل wažә́l	وژن wažən	-و وژن wә́ wažən-	-وژن wažən-	وژ waž	-(و وژ(ل wә́ waž(əl)-	-(وژ(ل waž(ә́l)-

b) where و is added in the middle in the present tense:
Verb	Present Stem	Present		Past Stem	Past	
Verb	Present Stem	Perfective	Imperfective	Past Stem	Perfective	Imperfect
بلل balә́l	بول bol	-و بول wә́ bol-	-بول bol-	بل bal	-(و بل(ل wә́ baləl-	-(بل(ل bal(ә́l)-

c) The verb ختل [to climb]:
Verb	Present Stem	Present		Past Stem	Past	
Verb	Present Stem	Perfective	Imperfective	Past Stem	Perfective	Imperfect
ختل xatә́l	خېژ xež	-و خېژ wә́ xež-	-خېژ xež-	خت xat [or خوت xot]	-(و خت(ل wә́ xat(əl)-	-(خت(ل xat(ә́l)-

d) where دل is dropped in the present tense:
Verb	Present Stem	Present		Past Stem	Past	
Verb	Present Stem	Perfective	Imperfective	Past Stem	Perfective	Imperfect
پېژندل pežandә́l	پېژن pežan	-و پېژن wә́ pežan-	-پېژن pežan-	پېژند pežand	-(و پېژند(ل wә́ pežand(əl)-	-(پېژند(ل pežand(ә́l)-
اوبدل obdә́l	اوب ob	-و اوب wә́ ob-	-اوب ob-	اوبد obd	-(و اوبد(ل wә́ ob(əl)-	-(اوبد(ل obd(ә́l)-

Or they can be share no similar sounds

Example: the verb لیدل [to see]

Verb	Present Stem	Present		Past Stem	Past	
Verb	Present Stem	Perfective	Imperfective	Past Stem	Perfective	Imperfect
لیدل lidә́l	وین win	-ووین wә́ win-	-وین win-	لید lid	-(ولید(ل wә́ lid(əl)-	-(لید(ل lid(ә́l)-

In either case the same rules apply, as noted by Anna Boyle:

Notes:

- present imperfective base = present stem
- present perfective base: و /wә́/ + present stem
- past imperfective base: past stem (+ ل /ə́l/—prohibited in 3rd Person Sing. Masc; optional elsewhere)
- past perfective base: و /wә́/ + past stem(+ ل /ə́l/—prohibited in 3rd Person Sing. Masc; optional elsewhere)

=== Second Conjugation Class ===
As above, in the second conjugation, perfectives are formed by a shift of stress to the existing prefix, rather than the addition of the و /wә́/ prefix.

Example one: the verb پرېښودل [to leave]

Verb	Present Stem	Past Stem	Present		Past	
Verb	Present Stem	Past Stem	Perfective	Imperfective	Perfective	Imperfective
پرېښودل prex̌odә́l	پرېږد preẓ̌d	پرېښود prex̌od	-پرېږد pré ẓ̌d-	-پرېږد pre ẓ̌d-	-(پرېښود(ل pré x̌od(əl)-	-(پرېښود(ل pre x̌od(ә́l)-

Notes:

- present imperfective base = present stem
- present perfective base: stressed prefix + present stem
- past imperfective base: prefix + past stem (+ ل /ə́l/—prohibited in 3rd Person Sing. Masc.; optional elsewhere)
- past perfective base: stressed prefix + past stem(+ ل /ə́l/—prohibited in 3rd Person Sing. Masc; optional elsewhere)

== Verbs: Multiple Stems ==
These are referred to as Strong Verbs by Anna Boyle.

These are verbs whose imperfective and perfective stems differ as well as their present and past stems. The difference between perfective and imperfective is carried by stress; in perfective the stress is on the first part of the verb whereas in imperfective the stress is on the last syllables.

These examples have been taken from Anna Boyle, pages 219–224 with the tables rearranged:

Examples:

Observation: either three stemmed [ږد, کېږد, کېښود] or four stemmed [یښود ږد, کېږد, کېښود]

Verb	Meaning	Present		Past	
Verb	Meaning	Perfective	Imperfectiv	Perfective	Imperfective
یښودل ix̌odә́l	to put	-کېږد kéẓ̌d-	-ږد ẓ̌d-	-(کېښود(ل kéx̌od(əl)-	-(کېښود(ل kex̌od(ә́l)- -(یښود(ل ix̌od(ә́l)-

Observation: Four stems

Verb	Meaning	Present		Past	
Verb	Meaning	Perfective	Imperfective	Perfective	Imperfective
بېول bewә́l بوول bowә́l	to take [to a place] to lead away	-بوځ bódz-	-بياي byāy-	-(بوتل(ل bótl(əl)-	-(بېو(ل bew(ә́l)- or -(بوو(ل bow(ә́l)-

Observation: Four Stems

Verb	Meaning	Present		Past	
Verb	Meaning	Perfective	Imperfective	Perfective	Imperfective
تلل tlә́l	to go	-و)لاړش) (w)lā́ṛ š‑-	-ځ dz-	-و)لاړل) (w)lā́ṛəl‑	-(تل(ل tl(ә́l)-

Observation: This example contains locative prefixes را,در,ور

Verb	Meaning	Present		Past	
Verb	Meaning	Perfective	Imperfective	Perfective	Imperfective
راتلل rā tlә́l	to come (towards 1st person)	-راش rā́ sh-	-راځ rā dz-	-(راغ(ل rā́ ğ(l)-	-(راتل(ل rā tl(ә́l)-
درتلل dar tlә́l	to go (towards 2nd person	-درش dә́r sh-	-درځ dәr dz-	-(درغ(ل dә́r ğ(l)-	-(درتل(ل dәr tl(ә́l)-
ورتلل war tlә́l	to go (towards 3rd person)	-ورش wә́r sh-	-ورځ wәr dz-	-(ورغ(ل wә́r ğ(l)-	-(ورتل(ل wәr tl(ә́l)-

Observation:Three stems:وړ [wṛ] for imperfective and یوس + یووړ for the perfectives . Note – Prefixed وړل /wṛә́l/ 'to carry', use its weak stem [as illustrated with پرېوتل above]

Verb	Meaning	Present		Past	
Verb	Meaning	Perfective	Imperfective	Perfective	Imperfective
وړل wṛә́l	to carry	-یوس yós-	-وړ wṛ-	-(یووړ(ل yówṛ(әl)-	-(وړ(ل wṛ(ә́l)-

Notes:

• Present imperfective base = (present) imperfective stem

• Present perfective base: initial-stressed present perfective stem

• Past imperfective base: (past continuous) stem+ (ل /ə́l/—prohibited in 3rd Person Sing. Masc; optional elsewhere)

• Past perfective base: initial-stressed past perfective stem + (ل /ə́l/—prohibited in 3rd Person Sing. Masc; optional elsewhere)

=== کول and کېدل ===
Here there use as main verbs are alluded to. To the verb – to do: The brackete [ṛ] in the present perfective base of کول /kawә́l/ 'to do' indicates that it sometimes is not pronounced in speech

Important: Here there use as main verbs are alluded to - when کول and کېدل are used as verbalizers, their perfective forms are not formed with the first conjugation prefix و /wә́/, but are irregular.

کول kawә́l		Imperfective		Perfective	
کول kawә́l		Stem	Base	Stem	Base
کول kawә́l	Present	کو kaw	-کو kaw- ́	کړ k[ṛ]	-وکړ wə́ k[ṛ]‑
کول kawә́l	Past	کو kaw	-(کو(ل kaw(ə́l)-	کړ kṛ	-(وکړ(ل wə́ kṛ(əl)-

To the verb – to become

کېدل kedә́l		Imperfective		Perfective	
کېدل kedә́l		Stem	Base	Stem	Base
کېدل kedә́l	Present	کېږ kéẓ̌	-کېږ kéẓ̌-	ش š	-وش wə́ š‑
کېدل kedә́l	Past	کېد ked	-(کېد(ل ked(ə́l)-	شو šw	-(و)شو(ل) wə́ šw(əl)-

Notes:

• Present imperfective base = (present) imperfective stem

• Present perfective base: و /wә́/ + present perfective stem

• Past imperfective base: (past continuous) stem+ ( ل /ə́l/—prohibited in 3rd Person Sing. Masc; optional elsewhere)

• Past perfective base: و /wә́/ + past perfective stem + ( ل /‑ə́l-/—prohibited in 3rd Person Sing. Masc; optional elsewhere)

== Verbs: aspect ==
Pashto in every tense has an aspect: perfective aspect [بشپړاړخ] and imperfective aspect [نابشپړاړخ]. The perfective aspect indicates completion or termination of an action. The imperfective aspect indicates continuity of an action or the habitual nature of the action.

	Present		Past	
	Perfective	Imperfective	Perfective	Imperfective
Verb – خوړل [to eat]	زه ډوډۍ وخورم نو بيا به راشم [Once] I eat food then i'll come	زه ډوډۍ خورم; I am eating	ما ډوډۍ وخوړه; I ate food	ما ډوډۍ خوړه چې هغۀ راغلو; I was eating when he came
Nuance	Completing the action [to eat] in the present moment	Continuing the action [to eat] in the present moment	Completion of the action [to eat] in the past	Continuity of the action [to eat] in the past

=== Stress ===
In both aspects the stress [خج] is applied to the verb. In perfective, the stress is applied to the initial part of the verb, while in the imperfective it is generally applied to the final part of the verb.

	Aspect	
	Perfective	Imperfective
Example: Wahə́l [to beat]	ما ډوکړه ووهله	زه ډوکړه وهم
Transliteration	Mā ḍukṛá wə́-wahəla	Zə ḍukṛá wahə́m
Stress notes	Stress shifts to the prefix wə́	Stress to the final verbal suffix ə́m
Literal meaning	I [pronoun oblique case] small-drum [female-singular noun] beat [feminine 3rd person past tense]	I [pronoun direct case] small-drum [female-singular noun] am-beating [1st person present tense]
English Equivalent	I played the small-drum.	I am playing the small drum

==== First conjugation ====
First conjugation verbs, e.g. وهل as above, can be recognised by perfective form, which begin with the prefix و /wə́/, which carries an inherent stress. In a-initial verbs, the perfecive prefix و /wə́/ coalesces with the /a/ to form a prefix وا /wā́/. Example:

	Aspect	
	Perfective	Imperfective
Example: Wahə́l [to beat]	ما پانګه واچوله	زه پانګه اچوم
Transliteration	Mā pā́nga wā́cawə́la	Zə pā́nga acawə́m
Stress notes	Stress shifts to the prefix wā́	Stress to the final verbal suffix ə́m
Literal meaning	I [pronoun oblique case] capital [female-singular noun] pour [feminine 3rd person past tense]	I [pronoun direct case] capital [female-singular noun] pour [1st person present tense]
English Equivalent	I invested	I am investing

==== Second conjugation ====
These are referred to as prefixed verbs aboves: all of the form prefix + stem. These behave morphosyntactically: they undergo stress shift to form the perfectived, and they can be separated from the stem by a second-position clitic or the negative morpheme.

کښېناستم - Stress to Distinguish Aspect
First pronunciation: imperfective aspect with final stress [ә́m], Second pronunciation: perfective aspect with initial stress on prefix [ké]

Example:

	Aspect	
	Perfective	Imperfective
Example: K[x̌]enɑstə́l [to sit]	کښېناستم	کښېناستم
Transliteration	kénɑstəm	kenɑstə́m
Stress notes	Stress shifts to the prefix ké	Stress to the final verbal suffix ə́m
Literal meaning	sit [1st person past tense]	sit [1st person past tense]
English Equivalent	I sat down	I was sitting down

==== Third conjugation ====
These are called compound verbs above – those with adjective complements and noun complements + forms of کول /kawə́l/ or کېدل /kedə́l/. Here the perfective is formed by:

- shifting stress from the verbalizer to the noun or adjective complement, according to the lexical stress of noun or adjective
- using the irregular perfective forms of the verbalizer (rather than the forms with و /wə́/).

Many third conjugation verbs are contracted in the imperfective aspect, in perfective constructions, the complement is always separate from the verbalizer.

Example 1:

	Aspect	
	Perfective	Imperfective
Transitive: Joṛ-awə́l [to make]	ډوډۍ مې جوړه کړه	ډوډۍ جوړوم
Transliteration	ḍoḍə́i me jóṛa kṛa	ḍoḍə́i joṛawə́m
Stress notes	Stress shifts to the adjective element jóṛa	Stress to the verb element in ə́m
Literal meaning	food/bread [feminine noun] I [1st person sing. weak pronoun] made [singular feminine adjective] do [3rd person sing. fem. past tense]	food/bread [feminine noun] make [1st person present tense]
English Equivalent	I made food	I am making food

Example 2:

	Aspect		Note
	Perfective	Imperfective	The verbal suffix ېږ [éẓ̌] is stressed in the imperfective. Due to this the final syllable ي[i] in our example is not stressed. Compare the past imperfective sentence کور جوړېده kor joṛedə́ The house was getting made Here the normal rules of aspect-stress are followed with the final syllable də́ being stressed.
Intransitive: Joṛ-edə́l [to get made]	کور جوړ شه	کور جوړېږي	The verbal suffix ېږ [éẓ̌] is stressed in the imperfective. Due to this the final syllable ي[i] in our example is not stressed. Compare the past imperfective sentence کور جوړېده kor joṛedə́ The house was getting made Here the normal rules of aspect-stress are followed with the final syllable də́ being stressed.
Transliteration	kor jóṛ šə	kor joṛéẓ̌i	The verbal suffix ېږ [éẓ̌] is stressed in the imperfective. Due to this the final syllable ي[i] in our example is not stressed. Compare the past imperfective sentence کور جوړېده kor joṛedə́ The house was getting made Here the normal rules of aspect-stress are followed with the final syllable də́ being stressed.
Stress notes	Stress shifts to the adjective element jóṛ	Stress to the verbal element in éẓ̌i	The verbal suffix ېږ [éẓ̌] is stressed in the imperfective. Due to this the final syllable ي[i] in our example is not stressed. Compare the past imperfective sentence کور جوړېده kor joṛedə́ The house was getting made Here the normal rules of aspect-stress are followed with the final syllable də́ being stressed.
Literal meaning	house [masc. sing. noun] made [singular masc. adjective] do [3rd person sing. masc. past tense]	house [masc. sing. noun] make [1st person present tense]	The verbal suffix ېږ [éẓ̌] is stressed in the imperfective. Due to this the final syllable ي[i] in our example is not stressed. Compare the past imperfective sentence کور جوړېده kor joṛedə́ The house was getting made Here the normal rules of aspect-stress are followed with the final syllable də́ being stressed.
English Equivalent	The house got made	The house is getting made	The verbal suffix ېږ [éẓ̌] is stressed in the imperfective. Due to this the final syllable ي[i] in our example is not stressed. Compare the past imperfective sentence کور جوړېده kor joṛedə́ The house was getting made Here the normal rules of aspect-stress are followed with the final syllable də́ being stressed.

== Verbs: verbal suffixes ==
Pashto utilises verbal suffixes [د کړ تاړي].

=== Personal suffixes ===
Verbal suffixes in Pashto denote person, gender and number.

Number	Person	Gender	Verbal suffix	Dialect variation
Singular	1st person		م əm	
Singular	1st person	Feminine	مه əma	
Singular	2nd person		ې e	
Singular	3rd person present		ي i	
Singular	3rd person past	Masculine	verb stem only [no suffix] or ۀ / ه ə	و o – in Peshawar Dialect; See below
Singular	3rd person past	Feminine	ه a	
Plural	1st person		و u	ي i – in Wazirwola and Dzadrani
Plural	2nd person		ئ əɪ	است āst – in South Western
Plural	3rd person present		ي i	
Plural	3rd person past	Masculine	ل əl	
Plural	3rd person past	Feminine	ې e	

It is easy to demonstrate these in with intransitive verbs in the imperfective.

==== Present imperfective tense ====
Gəḍéẓ̌ is the present imperfective stem of the verb gaḍedəl [to dance].

Number	Person	Verbal suffix	Example	Translation
Singular	1st person	م əm	زه ګډېږم; Zə gaḍéẓ̌əm	I am dancing
Singular	2nd person	ې e	ته ګډېږې; Tə gaḍéẓ̌ē	You are dancing
Singular	3rd person	ي i	دی/دا ګډېږي; Day/Dā gaḍéẓ̌i	He/She is dancing
Plural	1st person	و ū	موږ ګډېږو; Muẓ̌ gaḍéẓ̌u	We are dancing
Plural	2nd person	ئ ai	تاسو ګډېږئ; Tā́so gaḍéẓ̌ai	You are dancing
Plural	3rd person	ي i	دوی/هغوی ګډېږي; Dúi/Hağúi gaḍéẓ̌i	They are dancing

==== Past imperfective tense ====
Gəḍēd is the past stem of the verb gaḍēdəl [to dance].

Number	Person	Gender	Verbal suffix	Example	Translation
Singular	1st person		م əm	زه ګډېدم; Zə gaḍedә́m	I was dancing
Singular	2nd person		ې e	تۀ ګډېدې; Tə gaḍedé	You were dancing
Singular	3rd person	Masculine	ۀ ə	دی ګډېدۀ; Day gaḍedә́	He was dancing
Singular	3rd person	Feminine	ه a	دا ګډېده; Dā gaḍedá	She was dancing
Plural	1st person		و u	موږ ګډېدو; Muẓ̌ gaḍedú	We were dancing
Plural	2nd person		ئ әi	تاسو ګډېدئ; Tā́so gaḍedә́i	Your were dancing
Plural	3rd person		ل əl	دوی/هغوی ګډېدل; Dúi/Hağúi gaḍedә́l	They were dancing
Plural	3rd person	Feminine	ې e	دوی/هغوی ګډېدې; Dúi/Hağúi gaḍedé	They were dancing

Note: In the plural the 3rd person past masculine can denote both genders when talking about a group. While in the plural the 3rd person past feminine is only used when talking about a group of individuals classed in the female gender.

Example:

- هغوی ګډېدل [They were dancing] – can imply only males dancing or both males and females dancing
- هغوی ګډېدې [They were dancing] – implies only women were dancing. It can also be used for transgender people [ايجړاګان] by itself. But you can not say ايجړاګان ګډېدې since ايجړا is a masculine noun so one would use ايجړاګان ګډېدل.

=== 3rd Person Past Singular Masculine ===
Generally ه [ə] or no-stem suffix is employed. But sometimes ئ [əi] is found also.

PAST – 3rd Person Singular Masculine
Morphology	Verb	Verbal Suffix employed	Imperfective	Perfective
وتل- -watəl	الوتل alwatә́l to fly	none	الوت alwát	والوت wā́lwat
وتل- -watəl	پرېوتل prewatә́l to fall	none	پرېووت prewót	پرېووت préwot
وتل- -watəl	پوري وتل pori watә́l to cross	none	پوري ووت pori wót	پوري ووت póri wot
وتل- -watəl	ننوتل nənawatә́l to enter	none	ننوت nənawát	ننوت nә́nawat
وتل- -watəl	وتل watә́l to go out	none	وت wát wót	ووت wә́wat wә́wot
وتل- -watəl	تېروتل terwatә́l to be mistaken	none	تېروت terwát	تېروت térwat
تلل- -tləl	راتلل rā tlә́l to come	ئ əi	راغئ rāğә́i	راغئ rā́ğəi
تلل- -tləl	درتلل dar tlә́l to go [towards 2nd person]	ئ əi	درغئ darğә́i	درغئ dárğәi
تلل- -tləl	ورتلل war tlә́l [towards 3rd person]	ئ əi	ورغئ warğә́i	ورغئ wárğəi
	اروېدل to hear	ۀ ə	اروېده arwedә́	وروېده wárweda
	ایشېدل to boil	ۀ ə	ایشېده išedә́	وایشېده wә́ išedә́
	برېښېدل to shine/appear	ۀ ə	برېښېده brex̌dә́	وبرېښېده wә́ brex̌də
	درومېدل to march	ۀ ə	درومېده drumedә́	ودرومېده wә́ drumedə
	زېږېدل to be born	ۀ ə	زېږېده zeẓ̌edә́	وزېږېده wә́ zeẓ̌edə

==== Plural suffix of وتل watəl ====
With وتل the plural suffix ل(əl) is not used instead:

PAST – 3rd Person Singular Masculine				Change	PAST – 3rd Person Plural Masculine	
Verb	Verbal Suffix employed	Imperfective	Perfective	Change	Imperfective	Perfective
الوتل alwatә́l to fly	none	الوت alwát	والوت wā́lwat	ووت← واتۀ wot → wātə	الوته alwātә́	والواته wā́lwātə
پرېوتل prewatә́l to fall	none	پرېووت prewót	پرېووت préwot	ووت← واتۀ wot → wātə	پرېواته prewātә́	پرېواته préwātә́
پوري وتل pori watә́l to cross	none	پوري ووت pori wót	پوري ووت póri wot	ووت← واتۀ wot → wātə	پوري واته pori wātә́	پوري واته póri wātə
ننوتل nənawatә́l to enter	none	ننوت nənawát	ننوت nә́nawat	ووت← واتۀ wot → wātə	ننواته nənawātә́	ننواته nә́nawātə
وتل watә́l to go out	none	وت wát wót	ووت wә́wat wә́wot	ووت← واتۀ wot → wātə	واته wātә́	وواته wә́wātə
تېروتل terwatә́l to be mistaken	none	تېروت terwát	تېروت térwat	ووت← واتۀ wot → wātə	تېرواته terwātә́	تېرواته térwātә́

== Verbs: agreement ==
=== Intransitive verbs ===
As can be seen from the intransitive verb above [ګډېدل] – the verb agrees with the subject.

=== Agreement – transitive verbs ===
- Ergative construction is used in the past tense of transitive verbs: the predicate [verb] agrees in person, number and gender with the object. The subject changes to into the oblique case.
- In the present tense the transitive verb agrees with the subject: in person, number and gender.

Example 1: خوړل – transitive verb – to eat

Past
Verb	Object	Subject
وخړه / وخړله wә́xwṛa / wә́xwṛәla	دوډۍ ḍoḍә́i	سړي saṛí
eat	food	man
past perfective stem – with 3rd person singular feminine verbal suffix	noun – singular, feminine, direct case	noun – singular, masculine, oblique case
The man ate the food

Compare:

Present
Verb	Object	Subject
خوري xwrí	دوډۍ ḍoḍә́i	سړی saṛáy
eat	food	man
present imperfective stem – with 3rd person singular masculine verbal suffix	noun – singular, feminine, direct case	noun – singular, masculine, direct case
The man is eating the food

Example 2: اغوستل – transitive verb – to put on/dress

Past
Verb	Object	Subject
واغوستې wā́ğoste	جامې jāmé	ما mā
wear	clothes	I
past perfective stem – with 3rd person plural feminine verbal suffix	noun – plural feminine direct case	noun – singular, oblique case
I wore the clothes

Compare:

Present
Verb	Object	Subject
اغوندم ağundә́m	جامې jāmé	زه zә
put-on	clothes	I
present imperfective stem – with 1st person singular verbal suffix	noun – plural, feminine, direct case	noun – singular, direct case
I am wearing the clothes

==== Compound transitive verbs – split agreement ====
In the present tense the nominal/adjectival part of the compound verb agrees with the object. But the auxiliary کول [to do] agrees with the subject.

Example: پاکول – compound transitive verb – to clean

Present
Compound verb			
Auxiliary	Adjectival component	Object	Subject
كړي ki	پاکه pā́ka	کوټه koṭá	سړی saṛáy
do	clean	room	man
present perfective stem – with 3rd person singular masculine verbal suffix	adjective – singular, feminine, direct case	noun – singular, feminine, direct case	noun – singular, masculine, direct case
[When] the man cleans the room

In the past both nominal/adjectival and auxiliary components agree with the object.

Example: پاکول – compound transitive verb – to clean

Past
Compound verb			
Auxiliary	Adjectival component	Object	Subject
كولې kawә́le	پاکې pāke	کوټې koṭé	سړي saṛí
do	clean	rooms	man
past imperfective stem – with 3rd person plural feminine verbal suffix	adjective – plural, feminine, direct case	noun – plural, feminine, direct case	noun – singular, masculine, oblique case
The man was cleaning the rooms

== Verbs: participle ==
=== Present participle ===
The present participle is formed with the past imperfective stem without ل (əl) + ونک (unk) and declension follows the pattern of unstressed ی (ay).

Example ليکل [likəˈl] – writer → ليک [lik] past imperfective stem → ليکونکی [likəwúnkay] – writer

	Masculine		Feminine	
	Singular	Plural	Singular	Plural
Direct	ليکونکی likúnkay	ليکونکي likúnki	ليکونکې likúnke	ليکونکې likúnke
Oblique	ليکونکي likúnki	ليکونکو likúnko	ليکونکې likúnke	ليکونکو likúnko
Ablative	ليکونکي likúnki	ليکونکو likúnko	ليکونکې likúnke	ليکونکو likúnko
Vocative	ليکونکیه likúnkya	ليکونکو likúnko	ليکونکې likúnke	ليکونکو likúnko

=== Past participle ===
==== Past participle suffix ====
The past participle employs the following stems. It is used in perfect constructions of the verb.

Masculine		Feminine	
Singular	Plural	Singular	Plural
ی ay	ي i	ې e	

==== Present perfect ====
This is formed in the following ways:

Category 1 [non-compound verbs]: Past imperfective stem + past participle suffix + present imperfective of "to be"

Category 2 [compound verbs]: Past perfective stem of کېدل-ېدل and کول-ول + past participle suffix + present imperfective of "to be"

Example: of Category 1 verb رسېدل

		Singular	Plural	Translation
1st person	Masculine	رسېدلی یم rasedə́lay yəm	رسېدلي یو rasedə́li yu	Singular: I have reached Plural: We have reached
1st person	Feminine	رسېدلې یم rasedə́le yəm	رسېدلې یو rasedə́le yu	Singular: I have reached Plural: We have reached
2nd person	Masculine	رسېدلی یې rasedə́lay ye	رسېدلي یئ rasedə́li yəy	Singular: You have reached Plural: You have reached
2nd person	Feminine	رسېدلې یې rasedə́le ye	رسېدلې یئ rasedə́le yəy	Singular: You have reached Plural: You have reached
3rd person	Masculine	رسېدلی دی rasedə́lay day	رسېدلي دي rasedə́li di	Singular masc: He has reached Singular fem.: She has reached Plural: They have reached
3rd person	Feminine	رسېدلې ده rasedə́le da	رسېدلې دي rasedə́le di	Singular masc: He has reached Singular fem.: She has reached Plural: They have reached

==== Future perfect ====
Formed by به [future marker] +present perfect

		Singular	Plural	Translation
1st person	Masculine	به رسېدلی یم bə rasedə́lay yəm	به رسېدلي یو bə rasedə́li yu	Singular: I will have reached Plural: We will have reached
1st person	Feminine	به رسېدلې یم bə rasedə́le yəm	به رسېدلې یو bə rasedə́le yu	Singular: I will have reached Plural: We will have reached
2nd person	Masculine	به رسېدلی یې bə rasedə́lay ye	به رسېدلي یئ bə rasedə́li yəy	Singular: You will have reached Plural: You will have reached
2nd person	Feminine	به رسېدلې یې bə rasedə́le ye	به رسېدلې یئ bə rasedə́le yəy	Singular: You will have reached Plural: You will have reached
3rd person	Masculine	به رسېدلی دی bə rasedə́lay day	به رسېدلي دي bə rasedə́li di	Singular masc: He will have reached Singular fem.: She will have reached Plural: They will have reached
3rd person	Feminine	به رسېدلې ده bə rasedə́le da	به رسېدلې دي bə rasedə́le di	Singular masc: He will have reached Singular fem.: She will have reached Plural: They will have reached

==== Past perfect ====
This is formed in the following ways:

Category 1 [non-compound verbs]: Past imperfective stem + past participle suffix + past imperfective of "to be"

Category 2 [compound verbs]: Past perfective stem of کېدل-ېدل and کول-ول + past participle suffix + past imperfective of "to be"

Example:

		Singular	Plural	Translation
1st person	Masculine	رسېدلی وم rasedə́lay wəm	رسېدلي وو rasedə́li wu	Singular: I had reached Plural: We had reached
1st person	Feminine	رسېدلی وم rasedə́le wəm	رسېدلې وو rasedə́le wu	Singular: I had reached Plural: We had reached
2nd person	Masculine	رسېدلی وې rasedə́lay we	رسېدلي وئ rasedə́li wəy	Singular: You had reached Plural: You all had reached
2nd person	Feminine	رسېدلې وې rasedə́le we	رسېدلې وئ rasedə́le wəy	Singular: You had reached Plural: You all had reached
3rd person	Masculine	رسېدلی وه rasedə́lay wə	رسېدلي وو rasedə́li wu	Singular masc.: He had reached Singular fem.: She had Plural: They had reached
3rd person	Feminine	رسېدلې وه rasedə́le wa	رسېدلې وې rasedə́le we	Singular masc.: He had reached Singular fem.: She had Plural: They had reached

==== Agreement ====
1. Transitive verbs uses ergative construction: Past participle + verb "to be" agree with object; subject is in oblique case
2. Intransitive verbs: Past participle+ verb "to be" agree with the subject

Example: Intransitive Category 2 verb پخېدل [to ripen, mature]

Subject	Past participle	To be [present]	To be past	Grammar
زه [masculine]	پوخ شوی pox šə́way	يم yəm	وم wəm	1st person, singular, masculine
زه[feminine]	پخه شوې paxa šə́we	يمه yəmá	ومه wəmá	1st person, singular, feminine
موږ	پاخه شوي pāxə šə́wi	يو yu	وو wu	1st person, plural, masculine
موږ [all women]	پخې شوې paxe šə́we	يو yu	وو wu	1st person, plural, feminine
ته [masculine]	پوخ شوی pox šə́way	يې ye	وې we	2nd person, singular, masculine
ته [femine]	پخه شوې paxa šə́we	يې ye	وې we	2nd person, singular, feminine
تاسو	پاخه شوي pāxə šə́wi	يئ yəi	وئ əi	2nd person, plural, masculine
تاسو [all women]	پخې شوې paxe šə́we	يئ yəi	وئ əi	2nd person, plural, feminine
الو	پوخ شوی pox šə́way	دی day	وه wə	3rd person, singular, masculine
الوګان	پاخه شوي pāxə šə́wi	دي di	وو wu	3rd person, plural, masculine
مڼه	پخه شوې paxa šə́we	ده da	وه wa	3rd person, singular, feminine
مڼې	پخې شوې paxe šə́we	دي di	وې we	3rd person, plural, feminine

== Verbs: potential construction ==
=== Optative ===
The imperfective optative = past imperfective base of verb+ ای-āy [Southern Dialects], ی-ay [North Western Dialects], ې [North Eastern Dialects]

The perfective optative = past perfective base of verb+ ای-āy [Southern Dialects], ی-ay [North Western Dialects], ې [North Eastern Dialects]

=== Present potential ===
Formed by:

Imperfective optative + present perfective of کېدل

Example:

	Singular	Plural	Translation
1st person	رسېدلی شم rasedə́lay šəm رسېدی شم rasedáy šəm	رسېدلی شو rasedə́lay šu رسېدی شو rasedáy šu	I/We can reach
2nd person	رسېدلی شې rasedə́lay še رسېدی شې rasedáy še	رسېدلی شئ rasedə́lay šəy رسېدی شئ rasedáy šəy	You can reach
3rd person	رسېدلی شي rasedə́lay ši رسېدی شي rasedáy ši		He/She/They can reach

=== Past potential ===
==== Past potential 1 ====
To indicate:

1. Event did not take place: مونږ تېر کال جوار کرلی شوه [We might have been able to plant corn last year]
2. Event carried out over extended period of time: مونږ ډرامې ليدلی شوې [We were able to watch TV-shows]

Formed by:

Imperfective optative + present perfective of کېدل

Example:

	Singular	Plural
1st person	رسېدلی شو(ل)م rasedə́lay šw(əl)əm رسېدی شو(ل)م rasedáy šw(əl)əm	رسېدلی شو(ل)و rasedə́lay šw(əl)u رسېدی شو(ل)و rasedáy šw(əl)u
2nd person	رسېدلی شو(ل)ې rasedə́lay šw(əl)e رسېدی شو(ل)ې rasedáy šw(əl)e	رسېدلی شو(ل)ئ rasedə́lay šw(əl)əy رسېدی شو(ل)ئ rasedáy šw(əl)əy
3rd person	رسېدلی شو(ل)ه rasedə́lay šw(əl)e رسېدی شو(ل)ه rasedáy šw(əl)e	

==== Past potential 2 ====
To indicate:

1. Where the event was actually carried out e.g. تۀ هلته په وخت ورسېدلی شوې؟ [You were able to get there on time]

Formed by:

Perfective optative + past perfective of کېدل

	Singular	Plural
1st person	ورسېد(ل)ی شو(ل)م wə́rased(əl)ay šw(əl)əm	ورسېد(ل)ی شو(ل)و wə́rased(əl)ay šw(əl)u
2nd person	ورسېد(ل)ی شو(ل)ې wə́rased(əl)ay šw(əl)e	رسېدلورسېد(ل)ی شو(ل)ئ wə́rased(əl)ay šw(əl)əy
3rd person	ورسېد(ل)ی شو(ل)ه wə́rased(əl)ay šw(əl)ə	

== Auxiliary: "to be" ==
The verb "to be" is irregular in Pashto and does not have an infinitive form.

=== Present imperfective ===
Present imperfective tense of "to be":

Person		Singular	Plural
1st		زه يم zə yəm زه يمه zə yəma	موږ يو muẓ̌ yū
2nd		ته يې tə ye	تاسو يئ \ ياست tā́so yəy (in Southern dialect – yāst)
3rd	Masculine	دی دی day day	دوی دي duy di
3rd	Feminine	دا ده dā da	دوی دي duy di

=== Present perfective form ===
Present perfective tense of "to be":

Person		Singular	Plural
1st		زه شم zə shəm	موږ شو muẓ̌ shu
2nd		ته شې tə she	تاسو شئ tā́so šəy
3rd	Masc.	دی وي day wi	دوی وي dui wi
3rd	Fem.	دا وي dā wi	دوی وي dui wi

=== Past form ===
Past tense of "to be":

Person		Singular	Plural
1st		زه وم zə wəm زه ومه zə wəma	موږ وو muẓ̌ wu
2nd		ته وې tə we	تاسو وئ\واست tā́so wəy (in Southern dialect – wāst)
3rd	Masc.	دی ؤ day wə	دوی وو\ول dui wu (in Southern dialect – wəl)
3rd	Fem	دا وه dā wa	دوی وې dui we

=== Future tense ===
In Pashto the future tense [ راتلونکی مهال] is the same as the present tense [اوسنی مهال] with the exception that in the future tense the marker به [bə] is added.

In the third person future tense, also, irrespective of number or gender وي is used.

Future tense of "to be":

Person		Singular	Plural
1st		به يم bə yəm	به يو bə yu
2nd		به يې bə ye	به يئ bə yəy
3rd Person	Masculine	به وي bə wi/(Yi in Pakistani Pashto)	
3rd Person	Feminine	به وي bə wi/(Yi in Pakistani Pashto)	

=== Imperative Form ===
Also known as Command Form

Person	Singular	Plural
2nd	ته شه tə sha-can	تاسو شئ tā́so yəi

=== "Wi" – usage ===
وي [wi] is also used; this is the third person singular and plural of the present tense of the verb to be. وي is used when an assumption or a given fact is being discussed where as دی/ده/دي are used reporting an observation. شته functions as "there is" in English.

	Sentence	Meaning
وي	سړي دلته ناست وي	Men sit here [fact; speaker assumes this as true]
دي	سړي دلته ناست دي	Men are sitting here [an observation; speaker sees them]

== Verbs: causative construction ==
This is used to make verbs that mean "to make (someone/something) do X" [where do X is the original verb].

Formation: verb stem + an affix و /‑aw‑/.

The causative can either use the present stem or past stem [and sometimes both] – depending on the original verb.

Original verb	Stem used in bold		Causative verb
Original verb	Present	Past	Causative verb
لوستل lwastә́l to read	**-لول** **lwal-**	‑ لوست lwast-	لولول lwalawә́l to cause to read
زنګل zangә́l to swing	-زانګ zāng-	**-زنګ** **zang-**	زنګول zangawә́l to rock [e.g. in a cradle]
الوتل alwatә́l to fly	**-الوز** **alwuz-**	-الوت alwat-	الوزول alwuzawә́l to make fly; to explode something
اغوستل aghustә́l to wear	**-اغوند** **aghund-**	**-اغوست** **aghust-**	اغوندول/ اغوستول aghundawә́l/aghustawә́l to dress someone

Example:

خندل – original verb	خندول – causative verb
مه خانده má xānda	مه (يې) خندوه má (ye) xandawa
Don't laugh !	Don't make him/her laugh !

== Verbs: imperative form ==
This is used to make commands. The present stems of the verbs are used to make commands:

Verb	Stem used in bold	
Verb	Present	Past
لوستل lwastә́l to read	**-لول** **lwal-**	‑ لوست lwast-

=== Number ===
The two verbal suffixes are employed:

Number	Suffix
Singular	ه a
Plural	ئ əi

Example:

Verb	Number	
Verb	Singular	Plural
راتلل rātlә́l to come	**راځه** rādzá	**راځئ** rādzә́i
راتلل rātlә́l to come	come	come

The singular is told to one person; the plural is told to more than one person or as form of respectful command.

=== Positive command ===
Pashto positive imperative have two aspects: perfective (initial stress) an imperfective (final stress)

وهل – to beat wahә́l
Imperfective	Perfective
وهه wahá	و وهه wә́ waha
beat it [focus on continuance]	beat it [focus on completion]

In general the perfective aspect is used to make commands. However, for doubly irregular verbs, the imperfective aspect is used.

==== Intensive ====
The imperfective aspect in the imperative is also used to convey a sense of an urgent command example:

خوره چې ځو
xwrá če dzú

— Finish eating, so we go.

==== Compound verbs ====
===== Transitive =====
For compounds in the transitive, the nominal/adjective part of the verb agrees with the direct object.

پاکول – to clean pākawә́l
Masculine object	Feminine object
کور	کوټه
ته کور پاک کړه tә kor pā́k ka	ته کوټه پاکه کړه tә koṭá pā́ka ka
Clean the house	Clean the room

Where the is no object, the nominal/adjective part of the verb agrees with the subject

پاکول – to clean pākawә́l
No object of the verb
Masculine subject	Feminine subject
Said to a male	Said to a female
ته پاک کړه tә pā́k ka	ته پاکه کړه tә pā́ka ka
You clean it	You clean it

===== Intransitive =====
For compounds in the intransitive, the nominal/adjective part of the verb agrees with the subject

پاکېدل – to get clean pākedә́l
Masculine subject	Feminine subject
ته پاک شه tә pā́k ša	ته پاکه شه tә pā́ka ša
Get clean	Get clean

=== Negative command ===
Pashto Negative Imperatives only employs the Imperfective Aspect with stress on the particle مه /má/.

Compare:

وهل – to beat wahә́l
Imperfective -positive	Negative command
وهه wahá	مه وهه má waha
beat it	don't beat it

==== Prefixed verbs ====
North Eastern Pashto treats negative forms differently for prefixed verbs, placing the negative particle before the entire verb, whereas some other dialects place it between the prefix and the stem.

پرېکول – to cut prekawә́l
Prefix: پرې Stem: کول
North Eastern	Other
مه پرېکوه má pre kawa	پرې مه کوه pre má kawa
don't cut	don't cut

== Verbs: phrasal verbs ==
These by adding noun to verbs to make verbs phrase-like meaning.

Examples	Word	Root verb	Final verb				
توره کول túra kawə́l	sword	to do	to perform a brave act				
تڼۍ شلول taṇә́i šlawə́l	button(s)	to tear	to toil/endeavour				
ټېل وهل ṭel wahə́l	push	to beat	to shove				
سا اخستل sā axәstә́l	breath	to take	to breathe	ګټه کول Gata Kawal	Stone	To earn much money	To save or earn money or something for a specific purpose

== Verbalisers: Kawə́l and Kedə́l ==
These two verbs, کول and کېدل, are used to form compound verbs (denominal verbs). They use the irregular form in the perfective: without prefix و /wə́/.

=== Kawə́l ===
Here are the forms of Kawə́l as a verbaliser [not a main verb]:

	Present						Past			
	Imperfective		Perfective				Imperfective		Perfective	
	Singular	Plural	Singular	Plural			Singular	Plural	Singular	Plural
1st Person	کوم kawə́m	کوو kawú	کړم kəm kṛəm	کړو ku kṛu	1st Person		کولم kawə́ləm	کولو kawə́lu	کړم kṛəm کړلم kṛə́ləm	کړو kṛu کړلو kṛə́lu
2nd Person	کوې kawé	کوئ kawə́y	کړې ke kṛe	کړئ kəy kṛəy	2nd Person		کولې kawə́le	کولئ kawə́ləy	کړې kṛe کړلې kṛə́le	کړئ kṛəy کړلئ kṛə́ləy
3rd Person	کوي kawí		کړي ki kṛi		3rd Person	Masculine	کوه kawə́ کاوه kāwə́	(کول(ه kawə́l(ə)	کړ kəṛ که kə	کړل kṛəl کړله kṛə́lə
3rd Person	کوي kawí		کړي ki kṛi		3rd Person	Feminine	کوله kawə́la کوه kawá	کولې kawə́le کوې kawé	کړه kṛa که ka کړله kṛə́la	کړلې kṛə́le کړې kṛe

As mentioned by Anna Boyle : ړ /ṛ/ in present perfective forms is written, and pronounced in careful speech, but is unpronounced in many dialect. She mentions that in past 3rd person, even the /ṛ/ can be dropped, since the

personal suffixes differ from those in the present: past ه /ə, a/ as opposed present ي /i/; thus revealing tense without need of ړ /ṛ/.

=== Kedə́l ===
Here are the forms of Kedə́l as a verbaliser [not a main verb]:

	Present						Past			
	Imperfective		Perfective				Imperfective		Perfective	
	Singular	Plural	Singular	Plural			Singular	Plural	Singular	Plural
1st Person	کېږم kéẓ̌əm	کېږو kéẓ̌u	شم šəm	شو šu	1st Person		کېد(ل)م ked(ə́l)ə́m	کېد(ل)و ked(ə́l)ú	شو(ل)م šw(ə́l)əm	شو(ل)و šw(ə́l)u
2nd Person	کېږې kéẓ̌e	کېږئ kéẓ̌əy	شې še	شئ šəy	2nd Person		کېد(ل)ې ked(ə́l)é	کېد(ل)ئ ked(ə́l)ə́y	شو(ل)ې šw(ə́l)e	شو(ل)ئ šw(ə́l)əy
3rd Person	کېږی kéẓ̌i		شي ši		3rd Person	Masculine	کېده kedə́	کېدل(ه) kedə́l(ə́)	شه šə	شول(ه) šwə́l(ə́)
3rd Person	کېږی kéẓ̌i		شي ši		3rd Person	Feminine	کېد(ل)ه ked(ə́l)á	کېد(ل)ې ked(ə́l)é	شو(ل)ه šw(ə́l)á	شو(ل)ې šw(ə́l)é

As mentioned by Anna Boyle the 1st and 2nd person forms of Kedə́l are the same to those of the present perfective forms of "to be".

== Future Tense ==
The future tense is formed with the addition of به /bә/; which has been defined by Tegey as a "future marker" and as a "modal clitic" by Boyle.

=== Future Expression ===
The clitic به /bә/ is added to the present perfective verb to convey future time event, speculation, or doubt.

Verb		Present Perfective	Future
وهل wahә́l to beat		-ووه wә́ wah-	-به ووه bə wә́wah-
وهل wahә́l to beat	Example: 1st Person Singular	زه ووهم (zə) wә́ wahәm	زه به ووهم (zə) bə wә́wahəm
وهل wahә́l to beat	Example: 1st Person Singular	I beat [completed in present]	I will beat

plār bә me paisé wә́leẓ̌i
father:M:DIR will:FUT I:1:SG:WK money:F:DIR:PL send:AOR:PRS:3:SG:M
My father will send money

=== With Present Imperfective Tense ===
The clitic به /bә/ is added to the present imperfective verb to convey future event – but with. different nuances explained below.

Verb		Present Imperfective	Future
وهل wahә́l to beat		-ووه wә́ wah-	-به ووه bə wә́wah-
وهل wahә́l to beat	Example: 1st Person Singular	زه وهم (zə) wahә́m	زه به وهم (zə) bə wahә́m
وهل wahә́l to beat	Example: 1st Person Singular	I am beating	I will keep on beating

- To describe a future reference that is repeated or ongoing:

plār bә me paisé léẓ̌i aw zә bә xwrә́ma
father:M:DIR will:FUT I:1:SG:WK money:F:DIR:PL send:AOR:PRS:3:SG:M and I:1:SG:STR:DIR will:FUT eat:CONT:PRS:3:SG:F
My father will send money and I will (continue to) eat

- Present Imperfective verb base is also used where future marker like "tomorrow", "next week" etc. is used:

plār bә me paisé gā́nda léẓ̌i
father:M:DIR will:FUT I:1:SG:WK money:F:DIR:PL tomorrow:F:DIR send:AOR:PRS:3:SG:M
My father will send money tomorrow

- To contrast a future action with another future action:

tә bә dzé zә bә pāte kéẓ̌әm
you:2:SG:STR:DIR will:FUT go:CONT:PRS:2:SG I:1:SG:STR:DIR will:FUT behind:F become:CONT:PRS:1:SG
You'll be going, I'll be staying.

== Negative Future Expressions ==
With Present Perfect Base, negative future expressions can be created with the negative marker نه /nә/ and future marker به /bә/.

=== First Conjugation Class ===
==== Simple Verbs ====
If there is a grammatical subject or object:

Subject/Object + به /bә/ + و /wә́/ + نه /nә/ + present verb stem + verbal suffix

mewá bә wә́ nə xwri
fruit:F:SG:DIR will:FUT eat...:AOR:PRS:3 not:NEG ...eat:AOR:PRS:3
He/She/They will not eat the fruit

If there is both a grammatical subject and object:

Subject + به /bә/ + object+ و /wә́/ + نه /nә/ + present verb stem + verbal suffix

zә bә lik wә́ nə léẓ̌әm
I:1:SG:STR:DIR will:FUT letter:SG:M:DIR send...:AOR:PRS:1:SG not:NEG ...send:AOR:PRS:1:SG
I will not send the letter

If there is no grammatical subject nor grammatical object:

و /wә́/ + به /bә/ + نه /nә/ + present verb stem + verbal suffix

wә́ bә nə gardzi
walk...:AOR:PRS:3 will:FUT not:NEG ...walk:AOR:PRS:3
He/She/They will not walk

==== a-initial verbs ====
The و /wә́/ changes to وا /wā́/. Thereby:

If there is a grammatical subject or object:

Subject/Object + به /bә/ + وا /wā́/ + نه /nә/ + present verb stem + verbal suffix

Verb: اخستل [axstә́l]

mewá bә wā́ nə xli
fruit:F:SG:DIR will:FUT buy...:AOR:PRS:3 not:NEG ...buy:AOR:PRS:3
He/She/They will not buy the fruit

If there is both a grammatical subject and object:

Subject + به /bә/ + object+ وا /wā́/ + نه /nә/ + present verb stem + verbal suffix

Verb: استول [astawә́l]

munẓ̌ bә lik wā́ nə stawu
we:1:PL:STR:DIR will:FUT letter:SG:M:DIR send...:AOR:PRS:1:SG not:NEG ...send:AOR:PRS:1:SG
We will not send the letter

If there is no grammatical subject nor grammatical object:

وا /wā́/ + به /bә/ + نه /nә/ + present verb stem + verbal suffix

Verb: اچول [ačawә́l]

wā́ bә nə čawe
put...:AOR:PRS:2:SG will:FUT not:NEG ...put:AOR:PRS:2:SG
You will not put it

=== Second Conjugation Class ===
First: Between the prefix and the verb base نه /nә́/ is placed

Verb	Example	Future
bowә́l {to take}	bózu {we take}	{bo nә́ zu} {(we) not take}

Second: به /bә/ can then be placed

Before verb:

kor ta bә lāṛ nә́ šu
house:M:SG:DIR to:POST will:FUT go...:AOR:PRS:1:PL not:NEG go...:AOR:PRS:1:PL
We wont got to the house

Or before the object (likely where there is a subject)

muẓ̌ bə kor ta lāṛ nә́ šu
we:1:PL:STR:DIR will:FUT house:M:SG:DIR to:POST go...:AOR:PRS:1:PL not:NEG go...:AOR:PRS:1:PL
We wont got to the house

=== Third Conjugation Class ===
With compound verbs: نه /nә/ is inserted between the verb element and the noun/adjective element.

Example: روغېدل [roğedә́l]

tə bә róğa nə še
you:2:SG:STR:DIR will:FUT recover...:F:ADJ:SG not:NEG ...become:AOR:PRS:2:SG
You won't recover

== "Bә" With Past Imperfective Tense ==
The marker به /bә/ is also used to convey habitual actions in the past.

Verb		Past Imperfective	With به
وهل wahә́l to beat		-وهل wahә́l-	-به وهل bə wahәl-
وهل wahә́l to beat	Example: 1st Person Singular	وهلم wahә́lәm	به وهلم bə wahә́lәm
وهل wahә́l to beat	Example: 1st Person Singular	I was being beaten	I would be beat

kála če bә hağә́ ḍol ğaẓ̌awә́ zә bә gaḍedә́m
when that:COMP would he:3:SG:M:STR:OBL drum:SG:M:DIR sound:PST:3:SG:M I:1:SG:STR:DIR would dance:PST:1:SG
When he would play the drum, I would dance

== Adverbs ==
Adverbs that modify adjectives, verbs or verb phrases, and sentences; can be divided into the classes of time, place, manner, and degree.

These adverbs can act alone or as part of an adpositional phrase.

Acting alone:

mə́xkx̌e rā́ğla
before:ADV come:AOR:PST:3:SG:F
She came earlier

Acting as adipositional phrase:

də māmā́ na mə́xkx̌e rā́ğla
of maternal-uncle:DIR:M:SG from before:ADV come:AOR:PST:3:SG:F
She came before (my) uncle

=== Adverbs of time ===
These include adverbs with time reference and quantifier-like items.

Common adverbs of time:

Adverb	Transliteration	Meaning
تل	təl	always
هر کله	har kә́la	whenever
هیڅ کله (نه)	hits kә́la (na)	never
اوس	os [some dialects: وس "was"]	now
نن	nən	today
پرون	parún	yesterday
ګانده	gā́nda	tomorrow
سبا	sabā́	tomorrow
وختي	waxtí	early
وروسته	wrústa	later
پس	pas	later
مخکښې	mə́xkx̌e	before
لا	lā	yet

təl de xwdā́y lará
always:ADV NEC god:DIR have:CONT:PRS:IMP:SG
May God keep you (well/alive) forever!

=== Adverbs of place ===
This informs us where something takes place.

Common adverbs of time:

Adverb	Transliteration	Meaning
پورته	pórta	above
پاسه	рā́sa	above
دننه	danə́na	inside
ننه	nə́na	inside
دباندي	dəbā́ndi	outside
بهر	bahár	outside
باندې	bā́nde	on top
لاندې	lā́nde	below
نژدې	nəždé	near
پوري	póre	around
لرې	lә́re	far
کښته	kx̌ə́ta	underneath
هيچرې	hičárta	nowhere
هيچرته	hičáre	nowhere

kx̌ə́ta kx̌éna
underneath:ADV sit:AOR:PRS:IMP:SG
Sit down.

==== Demonstrative pronouns ====
These are both adverbs and demonstrative pronouns

Adverb	Transliteration			Meaning
دلته	də́lta			here
دلته	Waziri	دېلې déle	دولته dɔláta	here
دلته	Other Dialects	دلې dále		here
هلته	hálta			there
هلته	Other Dialects	هلې hále		there

Example sentence in Waziri:

déle dzə̃
hereADV go:CONT:PRS:1:SG
I am going here

== Adpositions ==
Pashto has pre-positions, post-positions and pre-post-positions. Adpositions generally govern either oblique or ablative case assignment to their objects.

=== Prepositions ===
List of prepositions

Preposition	Dialect variation	Meaning	Uses
د də	/de/, /ye/, /e/ [Middle dialects]	of	1. Mark possession e.g. د سړي لاس [A man's hand]; 2. To mark the objects of transitive nominalizations or gerunds 3. To mark the subjects of intransitive nominalizations or gerunds 4. Marks the item denoting the possessor or the holonym of which another adpositional phrase may denote the possessed item or be the meronym
له lə	د də [North Eastern]	from	1. It is only considered part of a circumposition/ambiposition.; 2. However, له /lə/ can function as a preposition of ablative function or of origin, when its object appears with ablative case marking. e.g. له پلاره راغلئ یم [I have come from father; North Western and South Western Dialects]
بې be		without	1. Considered as prefix. But can also be considered a preposition since the noun followed by بې shows ablative case-marking e.g. بې پلاره – with پلار being in the ablative case
په pə	پر /pər/	on; at	1. Used as preposition to express location e.g. په مېز مې کېښود [I kept it on the table]; 2. Used as part circumposition containing it may be used to express location e.g. په ... باندې; 3. Can govern a noun that refers to a time of day e.g. په يوې بجې راشه [Come at 1 O'Clock]
تر tər		till; than	1. Usually used as an ambiposition/circumpositions to express "up to, until" e.g. تر پېښور پورې لاړم [I went till Peshawar]; 2. As a preposition; is used in comparative and superlative constructions e.g. زه تر ماما دنګ يم [I am taller than my maternal-uncle]
لکه laká		like	1. As a preposition used as "like"e.g. لکه د زمري زورور يم [I am strong like a lion]

=== Postpositions ===
Preposition	Dialect variaition	Meaning	Uses
ته tə		to	1. Denotes destination. The object appears in the oblique case form. Example کور ته ځم [I am going to the house]
ته tə	له lə [North Eastern]	for	1. Denotes recipients e.g. ځان ته څپلۍ هم اخلم [I am buying shoes also for myself]

=== Ambipositions ===
Pashto uses a significant amount of ambipositions (circumpositions). These usually have two elements, with the noun object positioned between the two elements.

The initial element is likely to be one of these four elements:

	Transliteration
په	pə
له	lə
د	də
تر	tər

The final element is likely to be one of these words:

	Transliteration	Meaning
لاندې	lā́nde	below
پسې	pəsé	after
نه	na	
پورې	póre	
سره	sará	with
کې/کښې	ke/kx̌e	on
باندې	bā́nde	on
څخه	tsә́xa	
غوندې	ğwә́nde	like

Here is a list of the simple formations:

Second Component →	کښې...... ke	نه....... na	لاندې......lā́nde	باندې...... bā́nde	پسې...... pəsé	پورې...... póre	سره...... sará	څخه......tsә́xa	وروستو... wrústo.
First Component ↓	کښې...... ke	نه....... na	لاندې......lā́nde	باندې...... bā́nde	پسې...... pəsé	پورې...... póre	سره...... sará	څخه......tsә́xa	وروستو... wrústo.
...د də ...		د...نه də...na 'from'	د ...لاندې də...lā́nde 'under'		د ... پسې də...pəsé 'after'	د ... پورې də...póre 'up to, across'	د...سره də...sará 'with'		د...څخه də...tsә́xa 'from'
...له lə ...		له...نه lə...na 'from'	له...لاندې lə...lā́nde 'under'				له...سره lə...sará 'with'		له...څخه lə...tsә́xa 'from'
...پر pər ...	په... کښې pə...ke 'in, at, on'			په...باندې pə...bā́nde 'on top of, by means of'	په...پسې pə...pəsé 'after, behind'	پر ... پورې pər...póre 'with'	په...سره pə...sará 'with'		
...په pə ...	په... کښې pə...ke 'in, at, on'			په...باندې pə...bā́nde 'on top of, by means of'	په...پسې pə...pəsé 'after, behind'		په...سره pə...sará 'with'		
...تر tər ...			تر...لاندې tər...lā́nde 'under'			تر...پورې tər...póre 'until, up to'			تر ... وروستو tər...wrústo 'after'

Examples

	Example	Example's meaning
په ... کښې	په سيند کښې	in the river
په ... پسې	په ما پسې	after me
پر ... باندې	په مېز باندې	on the table
له ... سره	له سړي سره	with a man
تر ... لاندې	تر مېز لاندې	under the table
له ... څخه	له سړي څخه	from a man
له ... نه	له سړي نه	from a man
د ... نه	د سړي نه	from a man
تر ... پورې	تر پېښور پورې	till Peshawar
تر ... وروستو	تر خوراک وروستو	after food

The first element must be dropped when the object of the pre-position is a weak pronoun. Examples:

Example sentence	Meaning
سړی ور سره ځي	A man is going with him/her
سړي ور سره ځي	Men are going with him/her
چاړه مې در نه واخس	I took the knife from you
ليک ور باندې ايښی دی	The letter is on it

Sometimes in colloquial Pashto, the word له is dropped from نه and سره.

	Colloquial Pashto
له سړي نه	سړي نه
له سړي سره	سړي سره

=== Phrases ===
Pashto consist of combinations of circumposition phrases and additional words.

==== With له.... نه ====
These use ambiposition له.... نه + additional word

In some dialects له is replaced by د

	Component	Meaning
له.... نه پخوا له ... نه مخکې	From + before	before
له...نه پس له...نه پسته له...نه ورستو له ... نه وروستۀ	From + after	after
له...نه+ بهرر	From + outside	outside

Examples

Phrase	Sentence	Meaning
له .. نه پخوا	له تا نه پخوا راغله	She came before you
د ...نه مخکې	ستا نه مخکې راغله [د+تا = ستا]	She came before you
له ... نه وروستو	له تا نه وروستو راغله	She came after you
د ... نه بهر	د ور نه بهر ولاړ و	He was standing outside the door

==== With د ... په ====
Examples:

	Meaning
د ... په اړه də ... pə aṛá	about
د ... په شان də ... pə šān	like
د ... په وړاندې də ... pə wṛā́nde	against/opposite
د ... په پرتله də ... pə partalá	in comparison to
د ... له مخې də ... lə mә́xe	according to
د ... په ځای də ...pə dzāy	instead of

Examples:

Note: the possessive phrase [də/د] can be substituted with a weak possessive pronoun.

	Sentence where د not dropped	Meaning	Sentence with possessive pronouns	Meaning
د ... په اړه	د سړي په اړه يې څه ووې də saṛí pə aṛá ye tsə wә́ we	What did he/she say about the man	زما په اړه يې څه ووې zmā pə aṛá ye tsə wә́ we	What did he/she say about me
د ... په شان	د سپوږمۍ په شان ښځه غواړم də spoẓ̌mә́i pa šān x̌ә́dza ğwāṛә́m	I want a wife like the moon	ستا په شان ښځه غواړم stā pa šān x̌ә́dza ğwāṛә́m	I want a wife like you
د ... په وړاندې	د بلې ډلې په وړاندې يې وينه وکړه də bә́le ḍále pə wṛā́nde ye wә́ina wә́ kṛa	[They/He/She] talked against the other party	ستا په وړاندې يې وينه وکړه stā pə wṛā́nde ye wә́ina wә́ kṛa	[They/He/She] talked against you.
د ... په پرتله	د پيشوګانو په پرتله سپي زيات مينه ناک وي də pišogā́no pə partalá spí zyāt minanā́k wi	In comparison to cats, dogs are more affection	زموږ په پرتله هغوی لټ دي zmuẓ̌ pə partalá hağúi laṭ di	In comparison to us, they are lazy
د ... له مخې	د دې څېړنې له مخې دا ډېر ګټور دی də de tseṛә́ne lə mә́xe dā ḍer gaṭawár day	According to this research this is very beneficial	ستا له مخې څنګه شانتې سړی دی stā lə mә́xe tsə́nga šā́nte saṛáy day	According to you, what kind of a guy is he.
د ... په ځای	د کابل په ځای کندهار ته لاړ شه də kābə́l pə dzāy kandahā́r tə lā́ṛ sha	Instead of Kabul go to Kandahar	زما په ځای بل کس ټاکل شوی دی zmā pə dzāy bəl kas ṭākə́l šə́way day	He has been elected instead of me

== Adpositions and noun cases ==
=== Oblique case ===
Most common case. The object [noun] of an adposition is most often assigned the oblique case.

Used with:

- ته /tə/ 'to'
- سره /səra/ '[comitative] with'
- the prepositions د /də/ 'of' and په /pə/ 'at', plus any circumposition consisting of a postposition and one of these two prepositions;
- the circumposition له ... نه /lə ... na/ 'from/.

Example: سړی [using preposition د] and ښځه [using preposition په] are in oblique case; compare ملګری in direct case

də saṛí malgə́ray pə x̌ə́dze oséẓ̌i
of:PREP man:M:OBL friend:M:DIR on:PREP woman:F:OBL live:CONT:PRS:3:SG:M
The man's friend lives on [his] wife

Example: ما -oblique pronoun used with circumposition په...کښې

pə mā ke da
on:PREP me:1:SG:STR:OBL in:POST be:CONT:PRS:3:SG:F
She/it is in me

=== Ablative case ===
Used with:

- له /lə/ 'from'; and also د /də/ having the same meaning 'from'
- تر /tər/ 'from, originating from'
- Circumposition containing تر /tər/, له /lə/; except له ... نه /lə ... na/ 'from/
- په /pə/ the instrumental usage only found in construction with an adjectival, rather than nominal, object

Example: circumposition تر ... پورې

tər kóra póre tlә́m
till:PREP house:M:ABL till:POST go:CONT:PST:1:SG
I was going till the house

With د /də/, having the object marked in the ablative case gives the sense of '(motion) away from':

də kóra rā́ğləm
from:COMIT house:M:ABL come:AOR:PST:1:SG
I came from the house

په /pə/ 'the instrumental usage + adjective:

kor me pә grā́na joṛ kә́ṛay day
house:M:DIR I:1:SG:WK with:INSTR difficult:ADJ:M:DIR make:M:DIR do:AOR:PTCP:M:DIR be:CONT:PRS:3:SG:M
I have made the house with difficulty

=== Mixed ablative case and oblique cases ===
Other adpositions can assign either oblique or ablative case to the object, without a difference in meaning.

Example: with سړی in oblique case

be saṛí kor tә́š wi
without:PREP man:M:OBL house:M:DIR empty:ADJ:M be:AOR:PRS:3:SG:M
Without a man, a house is empty

Example: with سړی in ablative case

be saṛiya kor tә́š wi
without:PREP man:M:ABL house:M:DIR empty:ADJ:M be:AOR:PRS:3:SG:M
Without a man, a house is empty

== Passive voice ==
Pashto does not have a distinguishable morphological passive construction. The construction identified by some comprises a special case of denominal verbs. The verbal part of the construction consists of a form of the verbaliser کېدل /kedә́l ('to become') and a verbal complement (in the infinitive form).The actor is expressed as the subject of the sentence, and that noun is case-marked direct and triggers verb agreement (in both past and present).

pә x̌ār ke dә dwo wədānə́yo bənsáṭ kex̌awdə́l šo
in:PREP city:M in:POST of:PREP two:F:PL:OBL building:F:PL:OBL foundation:M:DIR place:INF become:AOR:PST:3:SG:M
The foundations of two buildings were laid in the city

The auxiliary verb کېدل combined with the infinitive وهل:

Active	"Passive"	Example:	Present		Past	
Active	"Passive"	Example:	Imperfective	Perfective	Imperfective	Perfective
وهل wahә́l	وهل کېدل wahә́l kedә́l	Example:	زه وهل کېږم	که زه ووهل شم	زه وهل کېدلم	زه ووهل شوم
وهل wahә́l	وهل کېدل wahә́l kedә́l	Example:	zә wahә́l kéẓ̌әm	kә zә wә́ wahәl šәm	zә wahә́l kedә́lәm	zә wә́ wahәl šwәm
to beat	to beaten	Example:	I am being beaten	Should I be beaten	I was being beaten	I was beaten

If the actor, if expressed, will most likely appear in an adpositional phrase governed by the circumposition د ...له خوا /də...lə xwā/ or د...له لورې /də...lə lure/.

	Present		Past	
	Imperfective	Perfective	Imperfective	Perfective
وهل	زه د خځې له خوا وهل کېږم	که زه د خځې له خوا ووهل شم	زه د خځې له خوا وهل کېدلم	زه د خځې له خوا ووهل شوم
وهل	zә dә x̌ә́źe lә xwā wahә́l kéẓ̌әm	kә zә dә x̌ә́źe lә xwā wә́ wahәl šәm	zә dә x̌ә́źe lә xwā wahә́l kedә́lәm	zә dә x̌ә́źe lә xwā wә́ wahәl šwәm
Meaning	I am being beaten by the woman	Should I be beaten by the woman	I was being beaten by the woman	I was beaten by the woman

As with active sentences, the subject may be expressed through the verb agreement suffix alone

dә x̌ә́źe lә xwā wahә́l kéẓ̌әm
of:PREP woman:F:OBL from:PREP side:F:OBL beat:INF become:CONT:PRS:1:SG
I am being beaten by the woman

This construction may modify a noun; like most noun modifiers, it precedes the head.

dә x̌ә́źe lә lúre likә́l sә́wi śeṛáne laṭawә́m
of:PREP woman:F:OBL from:PREP side:F:OBL write:INF become:AOR:PST:PTCP:PL:M:DIR research:F:PL:DIR find:CONT:PRS:1:SG
I am finding the studies that were written by the woman

== Adverbial Clauses ==
Pashto utilises conjunction phrases as adverbs. Examples:

Conjunction	Transliteration	Literal meaning	English approximate
هيڅ کله نه	hits kә́la na	nothing when no	never, at no time
که هر څنګه	kə hər tsә́nga	if ever how	howsoever, in whatever way
راځه چې	rādzá che	come that	(come) let's
تر اوسه پورې	tər ósa póre	till now up to/till	so far, as yet, up till now
تر دغه پورې	tər dáğa póre	till this till	as far as this
تر کله پورې	tər kә́la póre	till when till	till when?, how long?
تر کومه پورې	tər kóma póre	till where till	how far?, to where?

== Particles ==
Anna Boyle Davids defines particles "any lexically free item that does not host inflection and that does not function as the argument or complement of a verb or adposition".

=== Existential ===
The word شته [shta] and its negative form نشته /nə́ šta/ is used to denote existence.

Sentence	Literal meaning	Meaning
پړنګ شته ؟ pṛāng šta ?	Tiger there-is/are (exists)?	Is there a tiger?
نشته ná šta	not-there-is/are	There isn't

== Modal Particles ==
Anna Boyle Davids defines these as: "...uninflected sentence-level modifiers. The clause within the scope of the particle may appear as a main clause or as a finite subordinate clause". چې /t͡ʃe/ can appear as a main clause and as a finite subordinate clause.

=== Affirmative ===
==== که نه ====
Affirmation questions and statements contain the affirmation particle: که نه /kə ná/ (literally: "if/or no").

Affirmative Question Example:

lā́ṛe kə ná
go:AOR:PST:2:SG or:PARTICLE no:NEG
You went, didn't you?

Affirmative Statement Example:

ná kə ná
no:NEG or:PARTICLE no:NEG
No, of-course not; No, I didn't you know

=== Deontic ===
==== دې ====
The modal دې [de; Southern dialects: di] expresses a duty or obligation like "must " when used with the perfective tense of a verb.

hağá de wә́gaḍegi
he:3SG:STR:DIR NEC dance:AOR:PRS:3:SG
He should/must dance

==== باید ====
The modal "bāyád" is also found in construction with the present perfective form of the verb. Tegey notes that like English "should" it carries ambiguity.

hağá bāyád wә́gaḍegi
he:3SG:STR:DIR NEC dance:AOR:PRS:3:SG
He should dance

==== پکار دى ====
"Pəkā́r day" [it is needed] is also used as deontic clause

pəkā́r day če tә də́lta rā́še
necessary be:CONT:PRS:3:SG:M COMP you:2:SG:STR:DIR here:DEM come:AOR:PRS:2:SG
You should come here

=== Emphatic ===
==== خو ====
The particle خو /xo/ appears in the second-position and denotes emphasis.

dā xo manó da
this:DIR xo:EMPH shark:F:DIR be:CONT:PRS:3:SG:F
This is a shark!

Note: as an emphatic خو /xo/ is considered to be different from the conjunction خو /xo/ 'but'.

=== Possibility ===
==== ښایي / ښائي ====
The particle x̌ā́yi is placed sentence-initially and can appear in construction with the complementizer چې [če]

x̌ā́yi če sabā́ ta rā́ši
maybe:PARTICLE that:COMP tomorrow:ADV to come:AOR:PRS:3
Maybe he/she will come tomorrow

The particle x̌ā́yi can also demonstrate deonitic "should"

==== کېدی شي ====
Kedáy ši (could become) which potential construction of the verb "to become" – کېدل /kedә́l/ is also used as particle to denote possibility – again as above چې maybe used

kedáy ši [če] sabā́ rā́ši
become:CONT:PST:OPT become:AOR:PRS:3 [that:COMP] tomorrow:ADV come:AOR:PRS:3
Maybe/perhaps he/she will come tomorrow

=== Vocative ===
The following vocatives have been noted:

Vocactive	Transliteration	Meaning	Example
اي	ai	hey !	اي نجلۍ ai njlə́i hey girl
اې	e	hey !	اې سړیه e saṛáya hey man
آ	ā	hey !	آ ښځې ā x̌ə́dze hey woman
الۍ	alə́i	oh !	الۍ دا دې څه وکړه alə́i dā de tsə wə́ kṛə oh what did you do
وئ	wə́i	darn it, ouch	وئ خوږ شوم wə́i xúẓ̌ šwəm

=== Wish ===
==== کاشکې ====
The particle کاشکې /kāške/ or کاشکي /kāški/ is used as English "if only"; to express wish or desire that something would happen or would have happened.

It can be used with an optative verb, to express a counterfactual wish.

kā́ške waxtí tlә́lay wāy
if-only:PARTICLE early:ADV gone:AOR:PST:PTCP:M:DIR be:CONT:PST:OPT
I wish you had gone earlier

It can also be used with the present perfective verb, to express a polite request.

Example, from Ghani Khan's poetry:

hağé we xoẓ̌á dilbára kā́ske stā akә́l zmā ši
she:3:F:STR:OBL say:CONT:PST:3 sweet:ADJ:M:VOC beloved:N:M:VOC if-only:PARTICLE your:2:SG:STR:POSS intelligence:N:M:DIR my:1:SG:STR:POSS become:AOR:PRS-PRS:3
She was saying oh sweet beloved, if only your intelligence be mine

== Nuance ==
In this section the nuances or the semantics in relation to specific words will be explained.

=== راوړل and راوستل ===
Both راوستل /rāwastә́l/ and راوړل /rāwṛә́l/ are both transitive verbs denoting the meaning of "to bring"; but their nuance is different. راوړل /rāwṛә́l/ has the meaning in which the subject is directly involved thus have the meaning more inline with "to bring and carry". راوستل /rāwastә́l/ has the meaning in which the subject is causing the object to be brought but the object by its own motion is come thus having a meaning closer to "to bring along".

==== Tangible Objects ====
Example راوړل:

obә́ me rā́wṛe
water:N:F:DIR I:SG:WK bring:AOR:PST:3:F:PL
I brought the water

Explanation: Here the water is being brought by the speaker by his own hand or through a container e.g. by a glass

Example راوستل:

obә́ me rā́waste
water:N:F:DIR I:SG:WK bring:AOR:PST:3:F:PL
I brought the water

Explanation: Here the water is being brought by the speaker as he/she has caused its bringing e.g. has made a canal/channel from the river bringing about the water

==== Intangible Objects ====
For intangible object راوستل /rāwastә́l/ is better suited; as the object or concepts comes by its own motion.

parmәxtág ye rā́wast
development:N:M:DIR 3:WK bring:AOR:PST:3:M:SG
He/she/they brought development

But for bringing "news", "omens/luck" or "diseases" راوړل /rāwṛә́l/ is used – perhaps as the subject is implied to carry it.

x̌ə xabár de rā́waṛ
good:ADJ news:N:M:DIR 2:WK bring:AOR:PST:3:M:SG
You brought good news

=== Adjectives ===
As noted by Ghaza Noor, the choice of an adjective suffix can also have a change on the meaning.

Example: اغېز – ağéz – effect [noun.masc.sing and plural]

Adjective	Transliteration	Meaning	Nuance	Example Sentence
اغېزمن	ağezmán	affected	to describe the subject or object being influenced	زه له تا څخه اغېزمن شوم
اغېزمن	ağezmán	affected	to describe the subject or object being influenced	zə stā na ağezmán šwəm * I am affected by you
اغېزناک	ağeznā́k	effective	to describe the subject or object having the effective influence	ته اغېزناکه وينه کوې
اغېزناک	ağeznā́k	effective	to describe the subject or object having the effective influence	tə ağeznā́ka waina kawé You talk effectively

== Slang ==
Pashto also has rich slang language. Examples:

Slang	Literary	Meaning	Notes
بمبه راخوشې که bambá rā́ xwǝše ka	بمبه ولګوه bambá wə́ lagawa	Turn on the faucet/tap	خوشې (xwǝ́še) means "set free/loose"; so a literal translation would be "Let loose the tap!"
غوړي مې په کټوۍ کې ور وويشتل ğwaṛí me pə kaṭwə́i ke war wə́ wištəl	غوړي مې په کټوۍ کښې ور واچول ğwaṛí me pə kaṭwə́i kx̌e war wā́čawəl	I have put the oil in the cooking pot	ويشتل (wištǝ́l) means "to shoot [e.g a gun"; so a literal translation would be "I flung the oil in the cooking pot"

== Syntax ==
Pashto has subject-object-verb (SOV) word order as opposed to English subject-verb-object (SVO) word order. In intransitive sentences where there is no object Pashto and English both have subject-verb (SV) word order.

In Pashto, however, all modifiers precede the verb whereas in English most of the verbal modifiers follow the verb.

=== Phrasal syntax ===
Pashto exhibits strong head-final order in noun phrases and verb phrases.

==== Noun phrases ====
Pashto noun phrases generally exhibit the internal order determiner – quantifier – adjective – noun.

==== Adpositional phrases ====
The salient exception to the head-final principle can be found in adpositional phrases, given the existence of prepositions, postpositions, and circumpositions.

==== Verb phrases ====
Generally, head-final order is found also in the verb phrase, with the verb, if any, as the final element. Relative clauses and sentence-level modifiers may appear in postclausal position.

===== Light verb constructions =====
Pashto has a robust system of light verb constructions (LVC), two-word expressions that are semantically interpretable as a single predicate. Only one of the two canonical types—those of the form noun/adjective + verb (N-V).

As verbs are a closed class in Pashto, the LVC is the only means of creating new verbal forms in the language; it is also used as a way of importing loanwords, with the borrowed word filling the complement slot.

The inventory of light verbs in Pashto should not surprise anyone familiar with LVCs. In addition to the verbs کېدل /kedəl/ 'to become' and کول /kawəl/ 'to make; to do', which we refer to as the intransitive and transitive verbalisers when they act as light verbs, Pashto uses the verbs اخیستل /axistəl/ 'to take', وهل /wahəl/ 'to beat', نيول /niwəl/ 'to seize; to grasp', and ایستل /istəl/ 'to throw out' as light verbs.

Adjective complements of N-V LVCs always show agreement with the undergoer of the action of the verb, which is in turn marked in accordance with Pashto's system of split ergativity. Nominal complements are usually treated as the direct object of the verb, and are therefore also case-marked according to split-ergative alignment. The undergoer of the action, on the other hand, cannot be a direct object, as the verb can have at most two arguments; it is instead indicated by an adposition and accordingly case-marked oblique.

===== Elements in the verbal group =====
====== The verbal group in general Pashto ======
Certain particles can be inserted between:

- The perfective prefix و /wə/́and its verb.
- A prefix or pseudo-prefix and its verb. (This includes both the a-initial complex verbs and second conjugation, or prefixed, verbs.)
- The complement of a denominal verb and its verbalizer.

The particles that interact with verbs in this way are:

- The modal clitics به /bə/ and دې /de/
- The weak personal pronouns, or pronominal clitics مې /me/, دې /de/, یې /ye/, and مو /mo/
- The adverbial clitics خو /xo/ and نو /no/
- The negatives نه /ná/ and مه /má/

Modals, weak personal pronouns, and adverbials are all second-position clitics. They also obey strict rules of ordering relative to each other. Tegey (1977) reports the following ordering of enclitics between verbal components: خو /xo/> به /bə/> { مو /mo/| مې /me/| دې /de/| یې /ye/} > نو /no/. If the first syllable of the verb does not carry stress (that is, if it is an imperfective form), the negative precedes the verb, and the clitics follow the negative. Also, if a perfective form is negated, the negative marker—not the initial syllable of the verb—takes the stress.

====== Negative placement in the perfective verb phrase ======
The negative particle نه /ná/ nearly always precedes the verb and is placed as close to the verb stem as possible. In perfective constructions, it therefore follows the perfective marker و /wə/ for simplex verbs, and either initial /a/, the prefix, or the light verb complement for complex verbs. Because it carries an inherent stress, it takes the main stress in a perfective verb phrase.

== Numbers ==
=== Cardinal numbers ===
Direct case, masculine

Pashto	Pronunciation
نشت	nasht	0
یو	yaw, yo	1
دوه	dwa	2
درې	dre	3
څلور	tsalor	4
پنځه	pindzə	5
شپږ	špəg/špəʐ	6
اووه	owə	7
اته	atə	8
نه، نهه	nə, nəha	9
لس	las	10
یوولس	yawolas	11
دوولس	dwolas	12
دیارلس، دیرلس	dyārlas, dyarlas	13
څوارلس، څورلس	tswarlas, tswārlas	14
پنځلس	pindzəlas	15
شپاړس	špāṛas	16
اووه‌لس	owəlas	17
اته‌لس	atəlas	18
نونس, نورلس	nunas, nurlas	19
شل	šəl	20
یوویشت	yavwišt	21
دوه‌ویشت	dwawišt	22
درویشت	dərwišt, (dreyšt)	23
څلېرویشت	tsalerwišt	24
پنځه‌ویشت	pindzəwišt	25
شپږویشت	špagwišt	26
اوه‌ویشت	owəwišt	27
اته‌ویشت	atəwišt	28
نه‌ویشت	nəwišt	29
دېرش	derš	30
یودېرش	yawderš	31
دودېرش	dwaderš	32
دریدېرش	drederš	33
څلوردېرش	tsalorderš	34
پنځه‌دېرش	pindzəderš	35
شپږدېرش	špəgderš	36
اوه‌دېرش	owəderš	37
اته‌دېرش	atəderš	38
نه‌دېرش	nəderš	39
څلوېښت	tsalveṣ̌t	40
پنځوس	pindzos	50
شپېته	špetə	60
اویا	awyā	70
اتیا	atyā	80
نوي	nwi, nəwi	90
سل	səl	100
یوسلویو	yaw səlo yav	101
یوسلودوه	yaw səlo dwa	102
یوسلوشل	yaw səlo šəl	120
دوه‌سوه	dwa sawa	200
دوه سوه او لس	dwa sawa aw las	210
درې سوه	dre sawa	300
زر	zər	1000
یوزرویو	yaw zəro yaw	1001
یوزرودوه‌سوه او پنځه‌دېرش	yaw zəro dwa sawa aw pindzəderš	1235
لک	lak	100 000
ملیون	milyon	1 000 000
کروړ	kroṛ	10 000 000
ملیارد	milyārd	1 000 000 000

=== Ordinal numbers ===
Direct case, masc., sing.

- 1st لومړی lumṛai [also ړومبی]
- 2nd دويم dwaim [also دوهم]
- 3rd درېيم drəyam
- 4th څلورم tsaloram
- 5th پنځم pindzam
- 6th شپږم špaẓ̌am
- 7th اووم uwam
- 8th اتم atam
- 9th نهم nəham
- 10th لسم lasam

== Notes ==
1. په بارې کښې [pə bâre ke] is also used but this is a word-for-word borrowing from Hindi/Urdu के बारे में/کے بارے میں [kē bārē mēⁿ]. The Hindi word bārē [बारे/بارے] is itself from Persian در بارهٔ [dar bāraye\dar bāreye]
2. Pashto has a rich number of dialects due to which the language has been spelled several ways in English: Pashto, Pakhto, Pukhto.
