= Direct case =

Grammatical case

A direct case (abbreviated DIR) is a grammatical case used with all three core relations: both the agent and patient of transitive verbs and the argument of intransitive verbs, though not always at the same time. The direct case contrasts with other cases in the language, typically oblique or genitive.

The direct case is often imprecisely called the "nominative" in South Asia and "absolutive" in the Philippines, but linguists typically reserve those terms for grammatical cases that have a narrower scope. (See nominative case and absolutive case.) A direct case is found in several Indo-Iranian languages; there it may contrast with an oblique case that marks some core relations, so the direct case does not cover all three roles in the same tense. For example, Dixon describes "proto-Pamir" as having, in the present tense, the direct case for S and A and the oblique case for O (a nominative–accusative alignment), and, in the past tense, the direct for S and O and the oblique for A (an absolutive–ergative alignment). Because of this split (see split ergativity), neither "nominative" nor "absolutive" is an adequate description of the direct case, just as neither "accusative" nor "ergative" is an adequate description of the oblique case.

The Scottish Gaelic nominative case is also an example of a direct case, which evolved as the accusative became indistinguishable in both speech and writing from the nominative as a result of phonetic change. The situation in the Irish language is similar, though some pronouns retain a distinction (e.g. "you" (singular) - nominative tú, accusative thú)

In languages of the Philippines, and in related languages with Austronesian alignment, the direct case is the case of the argument of an intransitive clause (S), and may be used for either argument of a transitive clause (agent or patient), depending on the voice of the verb. The other transitive argument will be in either the ergative or accusative case if different cases are used for those roles. In languages where a single case is used for the other argument, as in Tagalog, it is called the indirect case. This is analogous to the direct–oblique distinction in proto-Pamir, but with the split conditioned by voice rather than by tense.
