= Ghazni skirmish (1601) =

Battle between the Hazaras and Afghans

- Part of Roshani movement
Date	1601
Location	Ghazni, Mughal empire
Result	Hazara victory

Belligerents
Hazaras of Ghazni	Roshani movement; Roshanis; Lohani tribesmen

Commanders and leaders
Shadman Khan Hazara; Murad Beg Hazara; Sharif Khan	Pir Jalala †

Strength
Unknown	Unknown

Casualties and losses
Unknown	Entire force

The clash at Ghazni was a brief engagement, fought between the Roshanis led by Jalaluddin Ansari, better known as Pir Jalala, the son of former Roshanid leader Pir Roshan, and Hazaras of Ghazni under Shadman Hazara in 1601, following a conflict involving the Lohani Afghans at Ghazni. The short engagement was a defeat for the Roshanis and the death of Jalala.

The Hazaras attacked Lohanis who were engaged in trading at Ghazni, the Afghans held their ground for a week but, due to lack of water turned back and asked the Roshani leader for help.

Pir Jalala entered Ghazni two days later in the guise of a merchant where he began attacking and killing men and taking women captive. The servants of Sharif Khan, a Mughal officer, engaged him in a short clash before withdrawing. Jalala subsequently collected a large quantity of goods, apparently under the pretext of purchasing them. On the sixteenth day, he attempted to take the goods away, Shadman Khan Hazara confronted him and, After a brief fight, defeated his army.

The Roshanis fled while Jalala himself wounded, escaped to a hill where Murad Beg and a few others came and killed him. His death brought the conflict surrounding his activities to an end. For some time, soldiers had been sent against him, and several years earlier, Zain Khan Koka, had undertaken an expedition against him. But he was finally cut down by a group of little-known men.

Akhund Darweza asserted that “the Hazaras sent the entire army of infidels to hell.” Pir Jalala’s body was cut in two, with one half hung at the gate of Kabul and the other at Ghazni, so that the poor people of that age might rejoice upon witnessing his fate, while his head was sent to the Mughal emperor Akbar.

through the grace and generosity of the Lord of the Worlds, and through the blessings of the prayers of the ninety-nine thousand saints and pious ones of Ghazni, aid came to the believers and the Hazara people emerging from the surrounding regions, sent the entire army of infidels to hell, dispatching Jalal al-Din's head to India, so that it might appear before Akbar Shah

— Akhund Darweza’s account

Mīr Ḏu'l-feqār ʿAlī Ardestānī wrote: "In the year 1007, during the reign of His Majesty Jalal-ud-Din Akbar— Miyan Jalal-ud-Din captured Ghazni and thoroughly ravaged the surrounding territories, yet he was unable to maintain a foothold there. As he was withdrawing, a battle broke out between the Hazaras and the Afghans; Jalal-ud-Din, having been wounded by Shadman Hazara, fled toward the hill of Ribat, where Murad Beg and several retainers of Sharif Khan overtook him and finished him off."

Another account by Olaf Caroe records..."In 1599 he turned south and actually took Ghazni by a ruse and with the aid of some Lohani tribesmen from Bannu or the Derajat. The governor, Sharif Khan, was driven out, and the Tariki raiders captured a large booty. In endeavouring to secure it by stealth Jalala and his party fell in with a strong body of Hazaras and the man whom all the King's soldiers had failed to suppress was killed by a stray shot."
