= Karakar Pass =

Mountain pass in the Hindu Kush

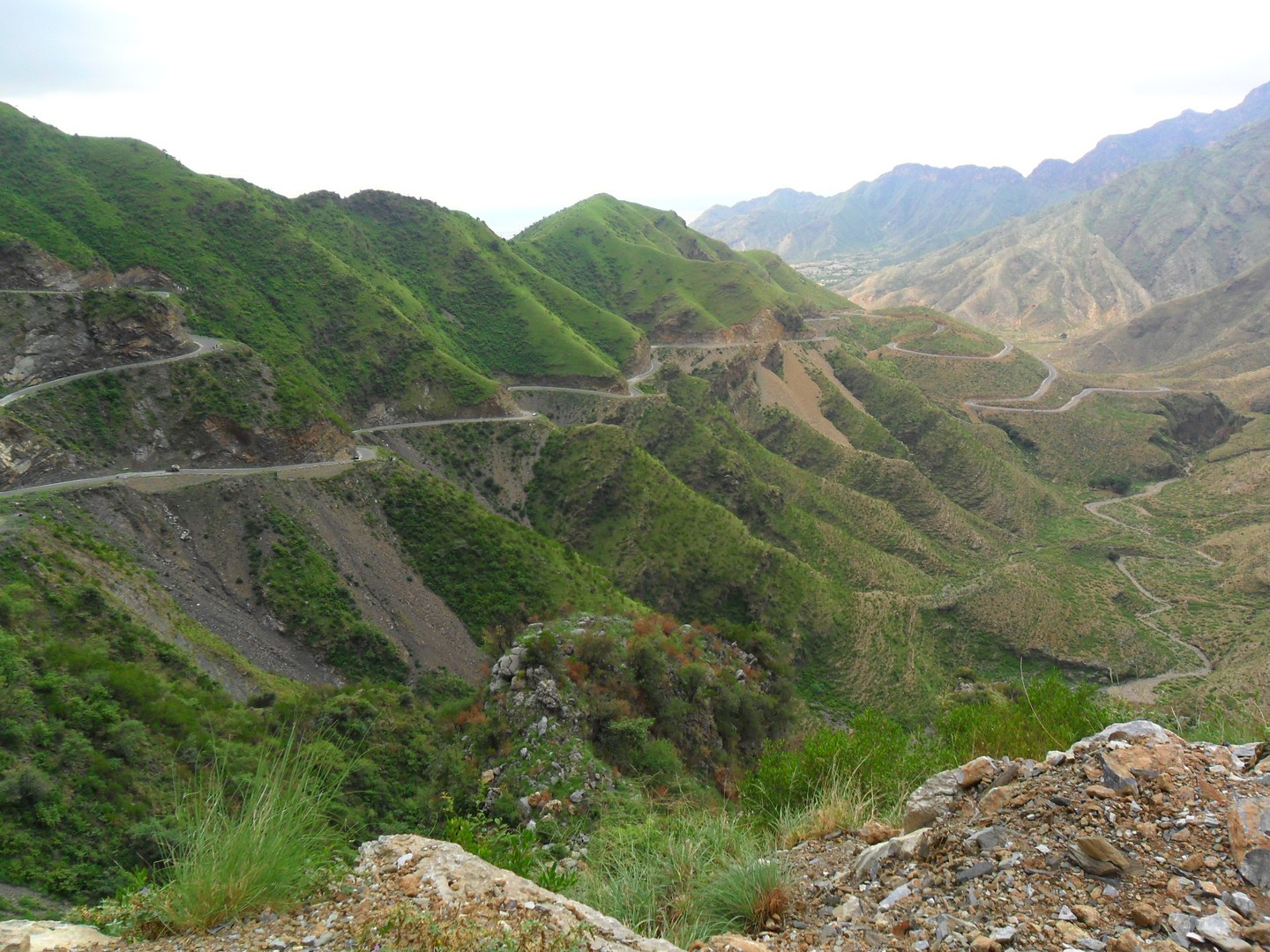
- Elevation: 1,336 metres (4,383 ft)

Third Approach
- Location: Pakistan
- Range: Hindu Kush

Karakar Pass (Pashto: کړاکړ دره; el. 1336 m./4384 ft.) is a mountain pass in the Hindu Kush, connecting Swat and Buner in Khyber Pakhtunkhwa, Pakistan. From the top of the pass, one can view Buner Valley.

It was at this pass in February 1586 where about 8,000 to 50,000 Mughal soldiers, including their commander-in-chief Birbal, were killed by the Yusufzai lashkar led by Kalu Khan. This was the greatest disaster faced by the Mughal Army during the reign of Akbar I.

The 45 km-long road from Pir Baba to Barikot passes through Elum Ghar rising through mature pine forests to Karakar Pass.

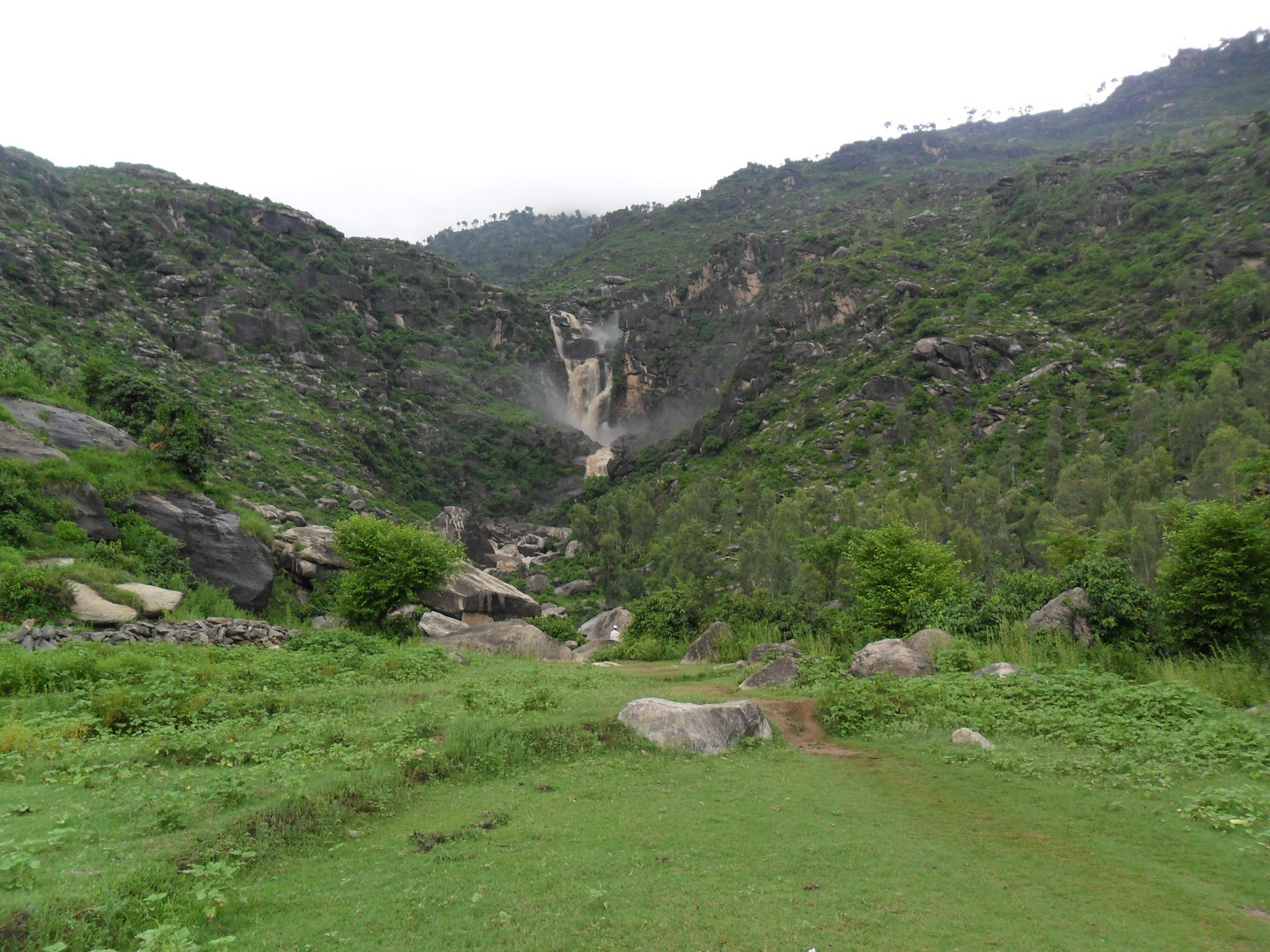
A waterfall, located on Karakar Pass

== See also ==
- Karakar Tunnel
- Elum Ghar
