= List of tunnels in Pakistan =

This incomplete list of tunnels in Pakistan includes roads and rails etc.

== Road tunnels ==
- Attabad Tunnels
- Abbottabad Tunnels - 1,720 m and 2,390 m
- Battal Tunnel - 2960 m (3 km)
- Karakar Tunnel - 2.1 km
- Karmong Tunnel - 442 m
- Kohat Tunnel - 1.9 km
- Lowari Tunnel - 8.5 km and 1.9 km
- Malakand Tunnel
- Mansehra Tunnel - 2.8 km
- Nahakki Tunnel
- Pak-China Friendship Tunnels
- Quetta Tunnel
- Shinkiari Tunnel
- Simly Tunnel
- Swat Motorway Tunnels
- Hyderabad Tunnels
  - Zalam Kot Twin Tube Tunnel
- Thakot Tunnel - 615m

== Railway tunnels ==
- Khojak Tunnel
- Lahore Metro Orange Line Tunnel

== Hydro tunnels ==
- Benton Tunnel

== Pedestrian tunnels ==
- Motto Tunnel at Ayubia National Park
