= Pashto alphabet =

Writing system used for the Pashto language

Pashto Abjad پښتو الفبا Pəx̌tó alifbā
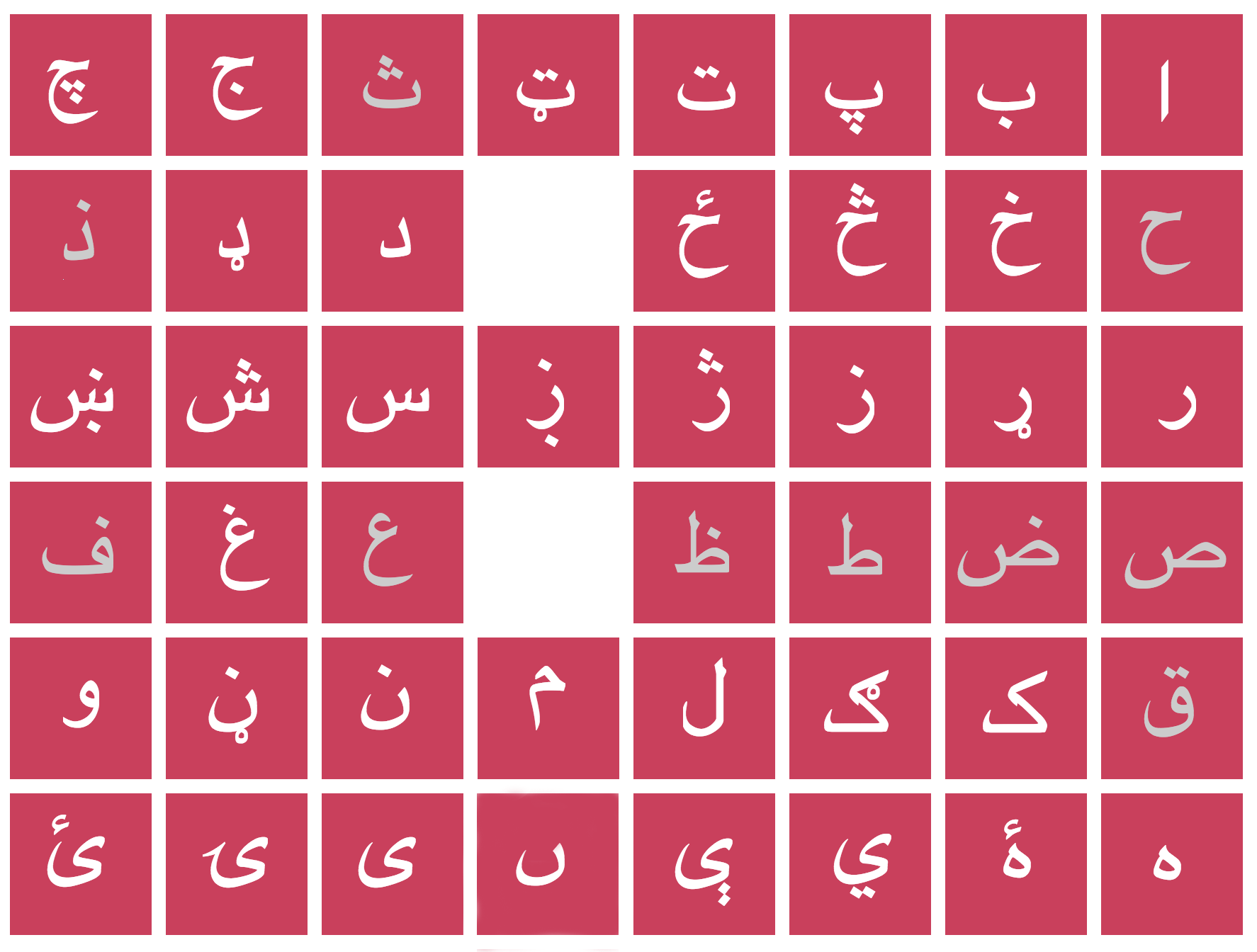
- The 46 Pashto alphabet shown in boxes
- Script type: Abjad
- Period: 16th century–present
- Direction: Right-to-left
- Official script: Afghanistan; Pakistan (Khyber Pakhtunkhwa)
- Languages: Pashto (incl. various dialects)

Related scripts
- Parent systems: Egyptian hieroglyphs: Proto-Sinaitic; Phoenician; Aramaic; Nabataean; Arabic; Perso-Arabic; Pashto Abjad

The Pashto alphabet (Pashto: پښتو الفبا, romanized: Pəx̌tó alifbā) is the right-to-left abjad-based alphabet developed from the Perso-Arabic script, used for the Pashto language in Afghanistan and Khyber Pakhtunkhwa, Pakistan. It originated in the 16th century through the works of Pir Roshan.

== Form ==
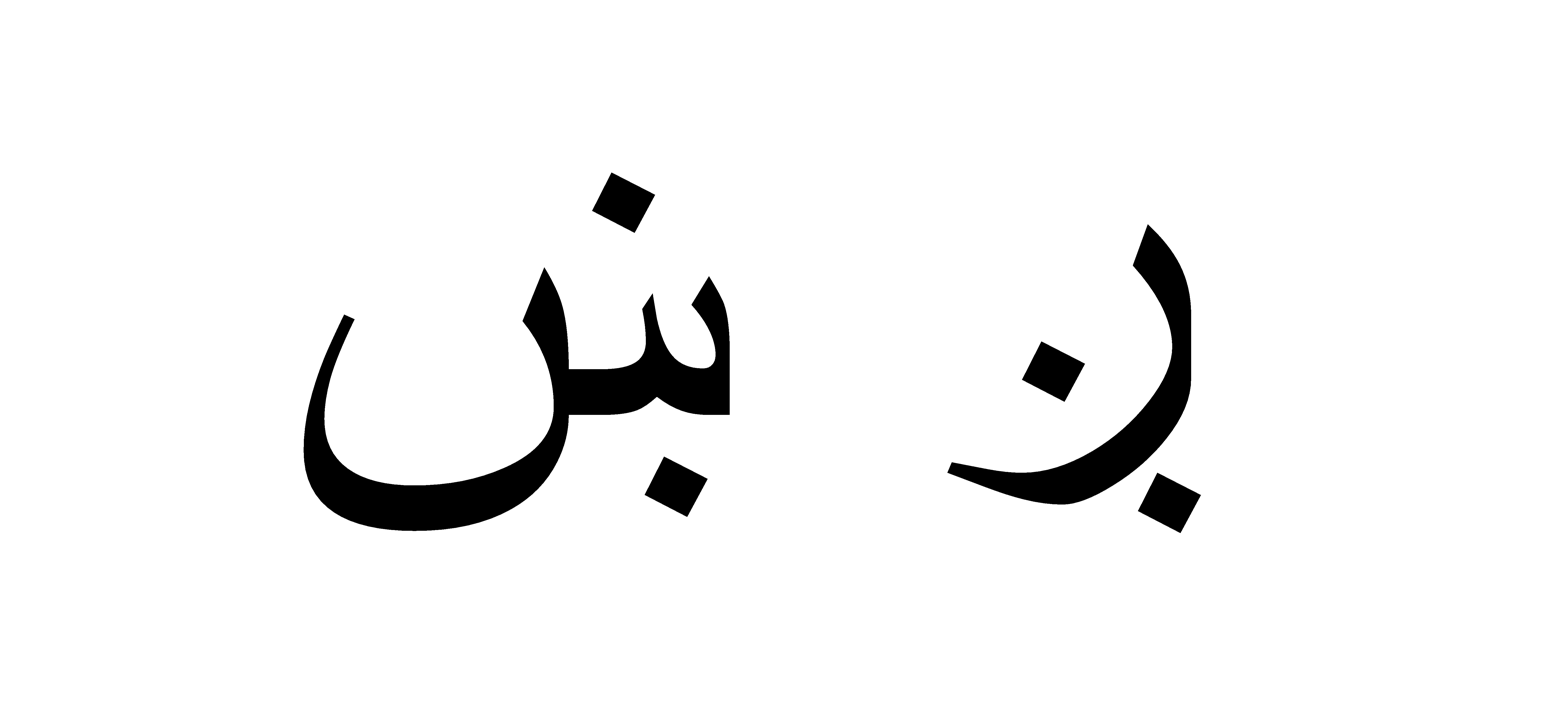
Two of the special Pashto letters: x̌in/ṣ̌in (left) and ǵē/ẓ̌e (right)

Pashto is written in the Arabic Naskh. Pashto uses all 28 letters of the Arabic alphabet, and shares 3 letters (چ, پ, and ژ) with Persian in the additional letters.

=== Differences from Persian alphabet ===
Pashto has several letters which do not appear in the Persian alphabet, which are shown in the table below:

| Letter | IPA | Base Arabic letter |
|---|---|---|
| ټ | /ʈ/ | ت |
| ډ | /ɖ/ | د |
| ړ | /ɭ̆/ | ﺭ |
| ڼ | /ɳ/ | ن |
| ښ | /ʂ/, /ç/ | س |
| ږ | /ʐ/, /ʝ/ | ﺭ |
| څ | /t͡s/ | ح |
| ځ | /d͡z/ | ح + ء |

All the additional characters are derived from existing Arabic letters by adding diacritics; for example, the consonants x̌īn/ṣ̌īn and ǵe/ẓ̌e look like Arabic's sīn and re respectively with a dot above and beneath. Similarly, the letters representing retroflex consonants are written with a small circle (known as a "panḍak", "ğaṛwanday" or "skəṇay") attached underneath the corresponding dental consonants.

The consonant /ɡ/ is written as either ګ or گ.

In addition to Persian vowels, Pashto has ئ, ې, ۀ, and ۍ for additional vowels and diphthongs.

=== Stress ===
Pashto employs stress: this can change the aspect of the verb and the meaning of the word. The Arabic alphabet does not show stress placement, but in transliteration it is indicated by the use of acute accent diactric: ´ over the vowel.

| Diactric | Pashto | Transliteraltion | Stress in Bold |
|---|---|---|---|
| á | ډَلَه | ḍála | **ḍá**-la |
| ó | اوړى | óṛay | **ó-**ṛay |
| ā́ | شاباس | šā́bās | **šā́**-bās |
| ә́ | ګَڼٙل | gaṇә́l | ga-**ṇә́l** |
| í | ناخْوَښي | nāxwaṣ̌í | nā-xwa-**ṣ̌í** |
| ú | اُوږَه | úẓ̌a | **ú**-ẓ̌a |
| é | بې ښې | be ṣ̌é | be-**ṣ̌é** |

=== Letters ===
Pashto has 45 letters and 4 diacritic marks. The Southeastern (SE) and Southwestern (SW), Northeastern (NE) and Northwestern (NW) dialects of Pashto are included.

| Name | IPA | | Transliteration | Contextual forms | | | Isolated | ALA-LC Romaniz. | Latin | Unicode (Hex) |
| Name | Symbol | English Examples | Transliteration | Final | Medial | Initial | Isolated | ALA-LC Romaniz. | Latin | Unicode (Hex) |
|---|---|---|---|---|---|---|---|---|---|---|
| alep or alif | [ɑ] | b**a**rk | ā | ـا | ـا | آ, ا | آ, ا | ā | Ā ā | U+0627, U+0622 |
| be | [b] | **b**orn | b | ـب | ـبـ | بـ | ب | b | B b | U+0628 |
| pe | [p] | **p**eel | p | ـپ | ـپـ | پـ | پ | p | P p | U+067E |
| te | [t̪] | | t | ـت | ـتـ | تـ | ت | t | T t | U+062A |
| ṭe | [ʈ] | | ṭ (or tt) | ـټ | ـټـ | ټـ | ټ | ṭ | Ṭ ṭ | U+067C |
| se^{2} | [s] | bi**s**cuit | s | ـث | ـثـ | ثـ | ث | s̱ | S s | U+062B |
| jim | [d͡ʒ] | **j**ug | j (or ǰ) | ـج | ـجـ | جـ | ج | j | J j | U+062C |
| če | [t͡ʃ] | **ch**eese | č | ـچ | ـچـ | چـ | چ | ch | Č č | U+0686 |
| he^{2} | [h]^{3} | **h**ouse | h | ـح | ـحـ | حـ | ح | ḥ | H h | U+062D |
| xe | [x] | lo**ch** (Scottish) | x | ـخ | ـخـ | خـ | خ | kh | X x | U+062E |
| tse śe | [t͡s] / [s] | ca**ts** | ś, ts, c | ـڅ | ـڅـ | څـ | څ | C | C c | U+0685 |
| dzim źim | [d͡z] / [z] | ai**ds** | ź, dz, j | ـځ | ـځـ | ځـ | ځ | ż | Ź ź | U+0681 |
| dāl | [d̪] | | d | ـد | | د | | d | D d | U+062F |
| ḍāl | [ɖ] | | ḍ (or dd) | ـډ | | ډ | | ḍ | Ḍ ḍ | U+0689 |
| zāl^{2} | [z] | **z**oo | z | ـذ | | ذ | | ẕ | Z z | U+0630 |
| re | [r] | **r**ain | r | ـر | | ر | | r | R r | U+0631 |
| ṛe^{4} | [ɽ] | | ṛ (or rr) | ـړ | | ړ | | ṛ | Ṛ ṛ | U+0693 |
| ze | [z] | **z**oo | z | ـز | | ز | | z | Z z | U+0632 |
| že | [ʒ] / [d͡z] | vi**s**ion, delu**s**ion, divi**s**ion | ž | ـژ | | ژ | | zh | Ž ž | U+0698 |
| ẓ̌ey (SW) z̄ey (SE) ǵey (NW) gey (NE) | [ʐ] (SW) [ʒ] (SE) [ʝ] (NW) [ɡ] (NE) | vi**s**ion or **g**ift | ẓ̌ (SW) z̄ (SE) γ̌/ǵ (NW) g (NE) | ـږ | | ږ | | ẓh (SW) zh (SE) g'h (NW) g (NE) | Ǵ ǵ (or Ẓ̌ ẓ̌) | U+0696 |
| sin | [s] | bi**s**cuit | s | ـس | ـسـ | سـ | س | s | S s | U+0633 |
| šin | [ʃ] / [t͡s] | **sh**oot | š | ـش | ـشـ | شـ | ش | sh | Š š | U+0634 |
| ṣ̌in (SW) s̄in (SE) x̌in (NW) xin (NE) | [ʂ] (SW) [ʃ] (SE) [ç] (NW) [x] (NE) | | ṣ̌ (SW) s̄ (SE) x̌ (NW) x (NE) | ـښ | ـښـ | ښـ | ښ | ṣh (SW) sh (SE) k'h (NW) kh (NE) | X̌ x̌ (or Ṣ̌ ṣ̌) | U+069A |
| swād^{2} | [s] | **s**ee | s | ـص | ـصـ | صـ | ص | s | S s | U+0635 |
| zwād^{2} | [z] | **z**oo | z | ـض | ـضـ | ضـ | ض | z | Z z | U+0636 |
| twe^{2} | [t] | **t**alk | t | ـط | ـطـ | طـ | ط | t | T t | U+0637 |
| zwe^{2} | [z] | **z**ebra | z | ـظ | ـظـ | ظـ | ظ | z | Z z | U+0638 |
| ayn^{2} | [ɑ] | b**a**rk | a | ـع | ـعـ | عـ | ع | ʻ | nothing | U+0639 |
| ğayn | [ɣ] | lo**ch** (Scottish) but voiced | gh (or γ) | ـغ | ـغـ | غـ | غ ^{15} | gh | Ğ ğ | U+063A |
| pe or fe^{2} | [f] / [p]^{5} | **p**eel / **f**ire | f | ـف | ـفـ | فـ | ف | f | F f | U+0641 |
| qāp | [q] / [k]^{6} | **k**eep | q | ـق | ـقـ | قـ | ق | q | Q q | U+0642 |
| kāp | [k] | **k**eep | k | ـک | ـکـ | کـ | ک ^{7} | k | K k | U+06A9 |
| gāp | [ɡ] | **g**et | g | ـګ | ـګـ | ګـ | ګ ^{8} | g | G g | U+06AB |
| lām | [l] | **l**amb | l | ـل | ـلـ | لـ | ل | l | L l | U+0644 |
| mim | [m] | **m**inute | m | ـم | ـمـ | مـ | م | m | M m | U+0645 |
| nun | [n] | **n**ear | n | ـن | ـنـ | نـ | ن | n | N n | U+0646 |
| ṇun | [ɳ] | | ṇ (or nn) | ـڼ | ـڼـ | ڼـ | ڼ | ṇ | Ṇ ṇ | U+06BC |
| nun póza^{16} nose nun | [˜] | macar**on** (French) | ̃ (over the vowel) **or** ń | ـں | ـن٘ـ | ن٘ـ | ں | ṉ | N n | U+06BA |
| wāw | [w], [u], [o] | **w**atch, s**ou**p | w, u, o | ـو | | و | | w, ū, o | W w, U u, O o | U+0648 |
| ğwə́nḍa he round hē | [h], [a] | **h**ey, st**u**ck (Cockney) | h, a | ـه | ـهـ | هـ | ه | h, a | H h, A a | U+0647 |
| kajíra he large-pretty hē | [ə] | b**ir**d (Received Pronunciation) | ə | ـۀ | | | ۀ ^{14} | ạ | Ə ə | U+06C0 |
| tsərgánda ye obvious yē | [j], [i] | **y**acht, w**ee**k (General American) | y, i | ـي | ـيـ | يـ | ي | y, ī | Y y, I i | U+064A |
| úǵda ye long yē | [e] | **e**ight [Note: [e] is not lengthened] | e | ـې | ـېـ | ېـ | ې ^{9} | e | E e | U+06D0 |
| nāriná ye masculine yēor wə́ča ye dry yē | [aj], [j]^{10} | tr**y** | ay, y | ـی | ـيـ | يـ | ی ^{10,}^{11} | ay, y | Ay ay, Y y | U+06CC; U+06D2 |
| x̌əźiná ye feminine yē or lakə́y ye tail yē | [əj] | st**ay** | əy | ـۍ | ـيـ | يـ | ۍ ^{10} | ạy | Əy əy | U+06CD |
| fālí ye verbal yē | [əj], [j]^{12} | st**ay** or s**ee** | əy, y | ـئ | ـئـ | ئـ | ئ ^{9,}^{12,}^{13} | ạy, y | Əy əy, Y y | U+0626 |

==== Notes ====
- **^1** At the beginning of a word, آ (alif with madda) represents the long vowel /ɑ/ in words borrowed from other languages (e.g. آغا **ā**ğā́ 'agha' (a title). At the beginning of a word, the letter ا (alif) represents the vowel /a/, e.g., اَسْپَه **á**spa 'mare'. In the middle or end of a word, ا represents the long vowel /ɑ/ which is following a consonant (e.g., کال k**ā**l 'year', and نْيا ny**ā** 'grandmother'). At the beginning of a word, the letter alif can also be used with a diactric mark [often not written] e.g. اِ (alif with a zer) as in اِسلام **I**slām 'Islam'.
- **^2** Ten letters, ق ف ع ظ ط ض ص ح ﺫ ث, appear only in loanwords of Arabic origin borrowed through Persian. Eight of these, ع ظ ط ض ص ح ﺫ ث, represent no additional phonemes of Pashto, and their pronunciation is replaced with other phonemes.
- **^3** ح /h/ tends to be omitted in pronunciation when at the end of a word, e.g., اِصْلاح iṣlāḥ is always pronounced as [isˡlɑ].
- **^4** The letter ړ represents /ɽ/
- **^5** The phoneme /f/ ف occurs only in loanwords. It tends to be replaced with /p/ پ.
- **^6** The phoneme /q/ ق occurs only in loanwords. It tends to be replaced with /k/ ک.
- **^7** It is also common to write the letter ک as ك.
- **^8** It is also common to write the letter ګ as and گ.
- **^9** In informal texts, ې is sometimes replaced by the letter ے, especially in Khyber Pakhtunkhwa.
- **^10** ی represents /aj/ when it is following a consonant (e.g., لَرْګَیْ larg**ay** 'wood'), and represents /j/ when it is following a vowel (e.g., دُویْ du**y** 'they'). In Khyber Pakhtunkhwa, ی is replaced by ے (e.g. لَرْګَےْ and دُوےْ).
- **^11** In Arabic loanwords, ی is pronounced [ɑ] (e.g. فَتْوٰی fatw**ā** 'Islamic legal opinion', تَقْوٰی taqw**ā** 'piety, God-consciousness').
- **^12** The letter ئ represents /j/ after a vowel, e.g., جُدائِي judā**yi** 'separation'.
- **^13** It is also common to write ﺉ with the hamza over the right side of the letter – ٸ.
- **^14** The letter ۀ is only represented at the end of a word, e.g., تېر**ۀ** ter**ə́** 'sharp'. The vowel /ə/, when present between consonants, is not represented by the letter ۀ, but instead is omitted, e.g., نٙنَوَتٙل n**ə**nawat**ə́**l 'to enter'. Only used in Khyber Pakhtunkhwa, not in Afghan spelling system, where ه is used instead (e.g. تېره ter**ə́** 'sharp').
- **^15** Some dialects also omit the letter غ in some words, e.g. consider the following words:
  - هغلته → هلته
  - دغه → دا
  - دغوے\دغوی → دوے\دوی
  - دغه سے\دغه سی → داسے\داسی
  - دغه هومره → دومره
  - دغلته → دلته
- **^16** Nasalised vowels /̃/ appear in certain dialects such as Banisi/Banuchi and Waṇetsi. It is represented with ں, e.g., بُويْں buĩ 'smell' [in these dialects].

==== Historical letters ====
The superscribed element of the letter ځ in earlier varieties was not hamza-shaped, but was very similar to little kāf of the letter ك. Such shape of the upper element of the letter is hard to find in modern fonts.

Since the time of Bayazid Pir Roshan, ڊ (dāl with subscript dot) was used for /d͡z/, which was still used in the Diwan of Mirza written in 1690 CE, but this sign was later replaced by ځ.

Another rare glyph for /d͡z/ is ج࣪, a ج with the same dot about harakat.

=== Diacritic marks ===
The Pashto diacritic marks: zwarakay, pēš, zēr, and zwar

The four diacritic marks are used:

| Diacritic | Unicode | Name | Transliterated name | Translit.6 | IPA[goð] | Latin |
|---|---|---|---|---|---|---|
| َ | U+064E | زْوار | zwār | a | [a] | a |
| ٙ | U+0659 | زْوارَکَیْ زْوارَکے | zwārakay | ə | [ə] | ə |
| ِ | U+0650 | زېر | zer | i | [i] | i |
| ُ | U+064F | پېش | peš | u | [u] | u |

Notes

- The diacritic marks are not considered separate letters. Their use is optional and are usually not written; they are only occasionally used to distinguish between two words which would otherwise appear similar, like the words ملا - back (body part) and مُلّا - Mullah.
- In Arabic loanwords, the tanwin fatha (ً) can be used, e.g. مَثَلاً – masal**an**, "for example".

=== "Ye" letters ===
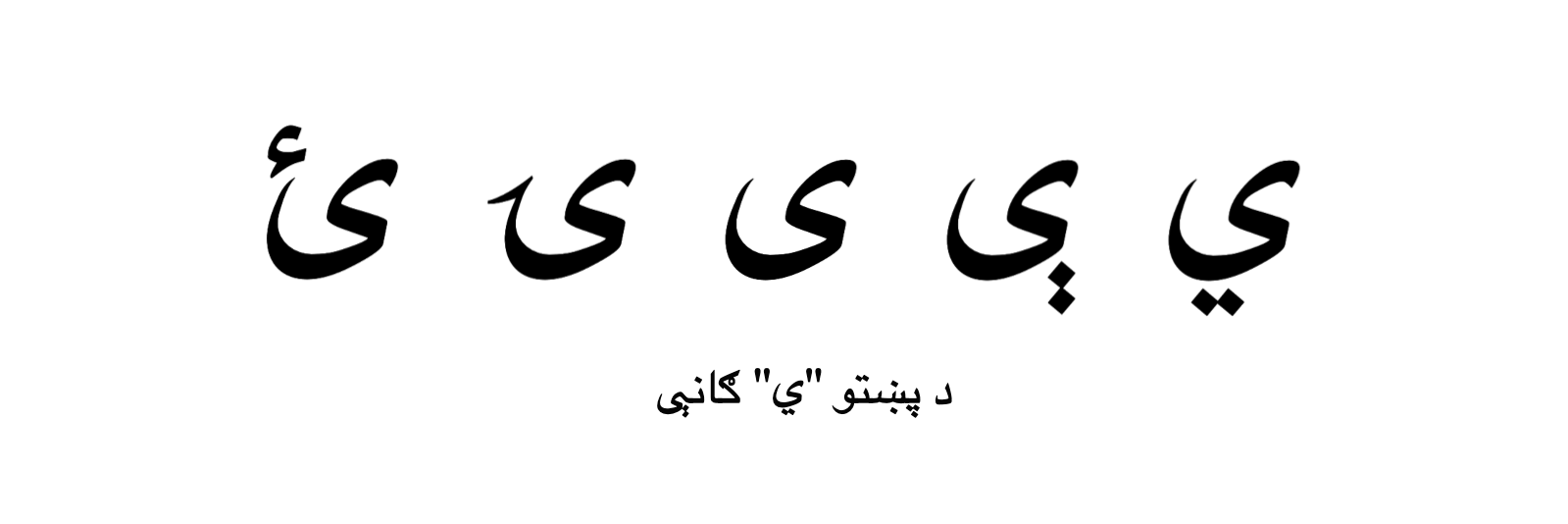
"Ye"-letters in Pashto alphabet

| Letter | Pashto name | Unicode name | Transliteration | IPA | Position in a word | Example |
|---|---|---|---|---|---|---|
| ي | tsərgánda ye^{5} | ARABIC LETTER YEH | y, i | [j], [i] | can appear anywhere | يٙم **y**əm ('(I) am') دِي d**i** ('(they) are') |
| ې | úǵda ye^{4} | ARABIC LETTER E | e | [e] | middle or end | يې y**e** ('you (sing.) are') |
| ی or ے | nāriná ye^{1} | ARABIC LETTER FARSI YEH or ARABIC LETTER YEH BARREE | ay/eh when following a consonant | [aj] | end | سْتورَیْ or سْتورَے stór**ay** ('star') |
| ی or ے | nāriná ye^{1} | ARABIC LETTER FARSI YEH or ARABIC LETTER YEH BARREE | y when following a vowel | [j] | end | دُوىْ or دُوے du**y** ('they') |
| ۍ | x̌əźiná ye^{2} | ARABIC LETTER YEH WITH TAIL | əy | [əj] | end | وَړۍ waṛ**ә́i** ('wool') |
| ئ | fālí ye^{3} | ARABIC LETTER YEH WITH HAMZA ABOVE | əy | [əj] | end | يٙئ y**əy** ('you (plur.) are') |
| ئ | fālí ye^{3} | ARABIC LETTER YEH WITH HAMZA ABOVE | y | [j] | middle | جُدائِي judā**y**í ('separation') |

Notes

- **^1** In Afghan orthography, this letter has ی shape, while in Peshawari orthography, its shape is ے. If the letter follows a consonant in a word, it indicates the word is masculine singular and in the direct case. At the end of verbs it is used to form verbal participle in the masculine.
- **^2** If ۍ ends a word it always indicates that the word it occurs in is feminine.
- **^3** If ئ occurs at the end of a verb, it indicates the verb is in second person plural form.
- **^4**If ې appears at end of nouns and adjectives it indicates that those are feminine. At the end of verbs it is used as verbal suffix and to form verbal participle in the feminine. It also ends certain circumpositions.
- **^5** If ي occurs at the end of a verb, it indicates the verb is in third person plural present form. At the end of nouns and adjectives it indicates that the word is masculine in the singular oblique case, plural direct case. It also used in the non-declining adjective class.

== Orthographic differences ==
There are broadly two standards for Pashto orthography, the Afghan orthography, which is regulated by the Academy of Sciences of Afghanistan, and the Peshawar orthography of the Pashto Academy in Peshawar. They used to be very similar in the past, until the orthography reforms were introduced in 1970s and 80s in Afghanistan. Both of them use additional letters: ټ ډ ړ ږ ښ ڼ ې ۍ. The Afghan standard is currently dominant due to the lack and negative treatment of Pashto education in Pakistan. Most writers use mixed orthography combining elements of both standards. In Pakistan, Pashto speakers who are not literate in their mother tongue often use Urdu letters.

The main differences between the two are as follows:

Word-final -y sound is denoted by ے letter in Pakistan and dotless ی letter in Afghanistan. Word-final -i sound is denoted by ي letter in both Pakistan and Afghanistan. Pre-reform Afghan orthography used ی for both cases, and some writers still often confuse them.

| Word | Pre-reform orthography | Peshawar orthography | Afghan orthography |
|---|---|---|---|
| saṛay "man" | سَړَیْ | سَړے | سَړیْ |
| dzāy "place" | ځای | ځاے | ځای |
| loy "big" | لویْ | لوے | لویْ |
| lari "has" | لَرِی | لَري | |
| likunkay "writer" | لِيکُونْکَیْ | لِيکُونْکَے | لِيکُونْکَیْ |
| likunki "writers" | لِيکُونْکِی | لِيکُونْکِي | |
| day "is" | دیْ | دے | دیْ |
| di "(they) are" | دِی | دي | |

- Also pronounced dəy in some dialects, and thus written دۍ or دئ, chiefly in Afghanistan.

Word-final -a sound is denoted by ه in Peshawar orthography, while the -ə sound is denoted by ۀ. Afghan orthography uses ه for both sounds.

| Word | Peshawar orthography | Afghan orthography |
|---|---|---|
| zə "I" | زۀ | زٙه |
| ṣ̌ə/xə "good (masculine)" | ښۀ | ښٙه |
| ṣ̌a/xa "good (feminine)" | ښَه | |

The letters گـ and ګـ for g are considered variants of the same character. Both are widely used, but the Afghan official materials prefer the گ form, while the Pakistani orthography sets a specific glyph for ګ which looks like ك with a circle below. Most Arabic script fonts, however, only implement a form of ګ that looks like ک with a circle.

Both standards prescribe the usage of ك for k. In practice, however, even the official sources often use the ک form. Historically, the two are calligraphic variants of the same character, ك is more common in modern Arabic, and ک is more common in Persian and Urdu. In Unicode they are split into two separate glyphs.

The y- sound before a ی-letter is written as ئـ in the Pakistani orthography and as يـ in the Afghan orthography. Pre-reform Afghan orthography also used ئـ.

| Word | Peshawar orthography | Afghan orthography |
|---|---|---|
| yəy "(you, plural) are" | ئٙئ | یٙئ |
| ye/yi "him, his (pronominal clitic)" | ئې | يي |
| ibtidayi "initial" | اِبْتِدائي | اِبْتِدایي |

- Also ياسْت yāst in Southern Pashto.

Pakistani orthography uses کْښې for the postposition kx̌e "in". Afghan standard prefers کي. In most dialects, this postposition is pronounced ke or ki, but the historical pronunciation, also found as a variant in some Southern Pashto dialects, is kṣ̌e. The verbal prefix کْښېـ (as in کْښېناسْتٙل kenastəl or kṣ̌enastəl "to sit down") is still pronounced kṣ̌e- in Southern Pashto and ke- in Northern Pashto, but some Afghan authors may also spell it like کيـ. On the other hand, words with خښ combination, like نٙخْښَه nәxṣ̌a "mark, sign", بٙخْښٙل bәxṣ̌әl "forgive, pardon", are written identically according to both standards, but some authors speaking Northern Pashto may write them according to their pronunciation: نٙښَه nәxa, بٙښٙل bәxәl.

In some auxiliary words like pronouns and particles, as well as in plural and oblique singular forms of feminine nouns, the Pakistani orthography uses ې, while the Afghan orthography often uses ي. It reflects the pronunciation of unstressed word-final -e in some Afghan dialects, particularly the Kandahari accent. Note also that the pronoun "you" is usually written تاسو tāso in Pakistan, reflecting the local dialects. In Afghanistan, this pronoun is written تاسي tāsi or تاسو tāso. In verbal prefixes like پْرېـ pre-, کْښېـ kṣ̌e-/ke-, both standards use ې.

| Word | Peshawar orthography | Afghan orthography |
|---|---|---|
| me/mi "me, my (pronominal clitic)" | مې | مي |
| ke/ki "in (a postpoistion and prefix)" | کْښې | کي |
| tā́se/tā́si "you (plural)" | تاسې | تاسي |
| stә́rge/stә́rgi (unstressed -e/-i) "eyes" | سْتٙرْګې | سْتٙرْگي |
| fāydé (stressed -é) "profits" | فائِدې | فایِدې |
| kenastəl/kṣ̌enastəl "to sit down" | کْښېناسْتٙل | کْښېناسْتٙل کېناسْتٙل |
| prexodəl/preṣ̌odəl "to leave, to stop" | پْرېښودٙل | |

The auxiliary verb شول in passive constructions is often written without a space with the copula in the Afghan orthography. E.g., لِیکٙلې شْوې دَه likәle šәwe da "is (fem.) written" may be spelled لِیکٙلې شْوېدَه by some authors.

The potential/optative participles are written with ـای -āy in Afghanistan (e.g. لِیکٙلای likəlāy "able to write"), and with ـے -ay in Pakistan (لِیکٙلے likəlay). These participles are pronounced with -āy in Southern Pashto of Kandahar, but even the Kabuli writers who pronounce them with -ay use ـای -āy to distinguish them from the past participles (لِیکٙلی\لِیکٙلے likəlay "written").

In both modern orthographies, matres lectionis (و for o and u, ي for i) should always be written in native Pashto words. Words like تٙرُوږْمۍ tәruǵmәy "darkness, dark night", وْرُوسْتَه wrusta "after, behind" etc used to be and still sometimes are written as تٙرُږْمۍ and وْرُسْتَه. The borrowed words should be written the way they were in the original languages: بُلْبُل bulbul "nightingale", گُل or ګُل gul "flower".

The phrase pә xayr "welcome", lit. "well, successfully" is written in two words in Afghanistan (پٙه خَیْر), but often as a single word in Pakistan (پٙخَیْر).

The Afghan orthography does not use a space in compound and suffixed words, while in Peshawar standard the letters should be disconnected without a space. The zero-width non-joiner is used in such cases.

| Word | Peshawar orthography | Afghan orthography |
|---|---|---|
| lāslik "signature" | لاس‌لِیک | لاسْلِیک |
| baryālaytob "victory" | بَرْیالےتوب | بَرْیالَيْتوب |
| pāytaxt "capital" | پاےتَخْت | پايْتَخْت |
| zṛәwar "brave, daring" | زْړۀوَر | زْړٙوَر |
| šāzādagān "princes" | شاه‌زادَه‌ګان | شاهْزادَگان |

The archaic orthography may also be used in certain texts, before standardisation.

| Word | Peshawar orthography | Afghan orthography | Archaic orthography |
|---|---|---|---|
| zә "I" | زۀ | زٙه | ځٙه |
| zmung/zmug/zmuẓ̌ "our" | زْمُونْږ زموږ | زْمُوږ زمونږ | ځْمُونْږ |
| zmā "my" | زْما | | ځْما |
| zoy "son" | زوے | زویْ | ځوے ځویْ |
| Kandahār "Kandahar" | قَنْدَهار | کَنْدَهار | قَنْدَهار |
| pāṇa/pāṇṛa "leaf" | پاڼَه پانړه | پاڼَه | پانْړَه |
| če/či "that" | چې | چي | چِه |
| ke/kṣ̌e "in" | کْښې | کي | کْښِ |
| dre "three" | دْرې | | دْرِ |
| ğruna "mountains (direct case)" | غْرُونَه | | غْرُونَ |
| ğruno "mountains (oblique case)" | غْرُونو | | غْرُونُ |

- In different dialects, "we" and its derivatives are pronounced مُونْږ mung or مُوږ mug/muẓ̌. Both types are found in Pakistan and Afghanistan, but the Afghan tradition prefers مُوږ after the Kandahari pronunciation.

Peshawar and Afghan standards also differ in the way they spell Western loanwords. Afghan spellings are influenced by Persian/Dari orthography, and through it often borrows French and German forms of the words, while Pakistani orthography is influenced by Urdu spellings of English words.

| Word | Peshawar orthography | Afghan orthography |
|---|---|---|
| Parliament | پارْلِیمان | پارْلَمان |
| Process | پْروسیسَه | پْروسِه |
| Conference | کانْفَرَنْس | کُنْفِرانْس |
| Chicago | شِکاګو | شِیکاگو |
| Culture | کَلْچَر | کُلْتُور |

== History ==
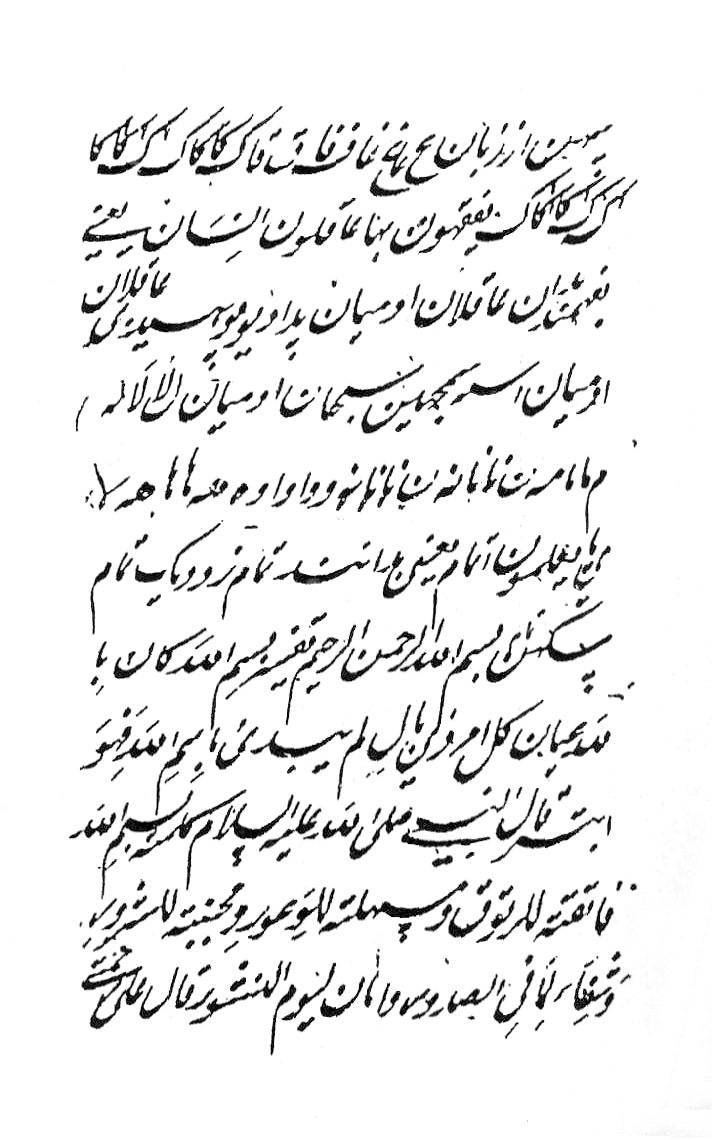
Excerpt from Khayr al-Bayān, written in Pashto in Nastaʿlīq script in 1651. The book was originally written by Bayazid Pir Roshan in the 16th century

In the 16th century, Bayazid Pir Roshan from Waziristan Pakhtunkhwa invented the Roshani script to write Pashto. It had 41 letters:

| ا /ɑ, ʔ/ | ب /b/ | پ /p/ | ت /t̪/ | ټ /ʈ/ | ث /s/ | ج /d͡ʒ/ | چ /t͡ʃ/ | څ /t͡s/ | ح /h/ | خ /x/ |
| د /d̪/ | ډ /ɖ/ | ڊ /d͡z/ | ﺫ /z/ | د· /ʐ/ | ﺭ /r/ | ړ /ɺ˞, ɻ, ɽ/ | ﺯ /z/ | ږ /ʒ/ |
| ڛ /s/ | س /s/ | ش /ʃ/ | ښ /ʂ/ | ص /s/ | ض /z/ | ط /t̪/ | ظ /z/ | ع /ʔ/ | غ /ɣ/ |
| ف /f,p/ | ق /q, k/ | ک /k/ | ګ /ɡ/ | ل /l/ | م /m/ | ن /n/ | ڼ /ɳ/ | و /w, u, o/ | ه /h, a, ə/ | ي /j, i, e/ |

28 of his letters came from the Arabic alphabet. He introduced 13 new letters into the Pashto alphabet. Most of the new letters he introduced i.e. ګ ,ښ ,ړ ,ډ ,څ ,ټ and ڼ are still written in the same form and are pronounced almost in the same way in modern Pashto. The sound system of the southern dialect of modern Pashto preserves the distinction between all the consonant phonemes of his orthography.

Pir Roshan also introduced the letter ږ (rē with dot below and dot above) to represent /ʒ/, like the ⟨s⟩ in pleasure, for which modern Pashto uses ژ instead. Modern Pashto uses the letter ږ to represent the sound /ʐ/ (northern dialect: /g/), but for that sound, Pir Roshan used a letter looking like ·د (dāl with central dot). His letter ڊ (dāl with dot below) to represent /d͡z/ has been replaced by ځ in modern Pashto. He also used ڛ (sīn with three dots below), an obsolete letter from the medieval Nastaʿlīq script, to denote the letter س (representing /s/) only in the isolated form. The Arabic ligature ﻻ (lām-alif) was also used. Two of his letters, پ and چ, were borrowed from the Persian alphabet.

== Dialect vowels ==
Waziristani has the following vowels:

| | Front | | Central | Back |
| | Unrounded | Rounded | Central | Back |
|---|---|---|---|---|
| Close | i | | | u |
| Close-mid | | | ə | |
| Open-mid | ɛ | œ | ə | ɔ |
| Open | a | | | ɒ |

These can potentially be romanised as:

| IPA | Pashto | Waziri Dialect | Romanisation | With stress |
|---|---|---|---|---|
| ɔ | ـا | North | ọ | ọ́ |
| ɒ | ـا | South | å | ǻ |
| œ | ـو | Both | ö | ö́ |
| ɛ | ـو | Both | ɛ | ɛ́ |

In the Marwat dialect and in the Karlāṇi dialects presence of nasalised vowels has been noted. As such the nasalised vowels be transcribed in the following ways:

| Nasalised IPA | Pashto | Romanisation | With Stress |
|---|---|---|---|
| ɑ̃ | ـاں | ā̃, āń | ā̃́, ā́ń |
| ã | ـَں | ã, ań | ã́, áń |
| ẽ | ـېں | ẽ, eń | ẽ́, éń |
| ĩ | ـيں | ĩ, iń | ĩ́, íń |
| ũ | ـُوں | ũ, uń | ṹ, úń |
| õ | ـوں | õ, oń | ṍ, óń |
| ə̃ | ـٙں | ə̃, əń | ə̃́, ə́ń |

See also

- Pre-Islamic scripts in Afghanistan

== Notes ==
1. As 2nd Person Singular - example: ته کور ته ځې [you are going home]. And as Past Feminine 3rd Person Plural - example: هغوی ګډېدې [They (women) were dancing)
2. Example: پرې, پې, تر...پورې etc
3. Example: سړی تللی و [the man had gone]
4. Example: خځه تللې وه [the woman had gone]

== Bibliography ==
- Awde & Sarwan (2002). "Pashto dictionary & phrasebook", page 24.
