= Abdul Qadir (academician) =

Pakistani Islamic scholar and academician

Maulana Abdul Qadir
- مولانا عبد القادر

Personal life
- Born: 14 June 1905 Pabaini Swabi, North-West Frontier Province, British Raj
- Died: 22 October 1969 (aged 64) Rajshahi, East Pakistan
- Resting place: Peshawar University graveyard
- Children: 0
- Education: Islamia College University; Aligarh Muslim University
- Known for: Pashto Academy

Religious life
- Religion: Islam
- Denomination: Sunni
- Institute: All India Radio; Pashto Academy

1st Director of Pashto Academy
- In office 1955–unknown
- Preceded by: None (office created)
- Succeeded by: Mian Syed Rasool Rasa

Abdul Qadir (Pashto: مولانا عبد القادر; 14 June 1905, Pabaini Swabi - 22 October 1969) was a Pakistani Islamic scholar, academician and founder of Pashto Academy and Department of Pashto, University of Peshawar.

== Education ==
Abdul Qadir got his matriculation, intermediate and graduation from Islamia College Peshawar in 1927, and masters in English (1929), Arabic (1930), LLB (1931) and BT (1932) from Aligarh Muslim University.

== Career ==
Qadri started his career in 1942 as an editor of a Pashto magazine "Nan Paron" (Today, Yesterday) then he was appointed in charge of the Pashto section (Middle East) by Patras Bokhari (then director-general) of All India Radio. In the early 50s, he was made Vice-Counsel and then ambassador in Kabul, Afghanistan from Pakistan. From University Library of Tübingen Germany, he discovered "Khayr al-Bayān" in 1967 (rare manuscript written by Pir Roshan) the first prose book in Pashto.

== Death ==
Qadri died on 22 October 1969 during a seminar at Rajshahi in East Pakistan (modern day Bangladesh). He is buried in Peshawar, Pakistan.
