= Peryano Dand =

Lake on Elum Ghar, Khyber Pakhtunkhwa, Pakistan

Peryano Dand (Pashto: د پېریانو ډنډ) is a rectangular natural lake on the Elum Ghar mountain in Pir Baba, Buner District of Khyber Pakhtunkhwa.

The lake is actually hosted by a bowl-like huge rock. It is surrounded by very high rocks from three sides. It is roughly 20 metres by 10 metres. It stretches east-west in length and north-south in width. Its depth varies from 2 feet to 10 feet. It is shallow on its eastern edge, but very deep on other three sides, especially the north-west side where the waterfall gushes down. There are rocks of different sizes on the eastern side, but the rest of the lake's bottom is sand.

The sandy bottom and pleasant scenery make Peryano Dand a popular spot for swimming and diving. The lake is reachable by a substantial hike.

Weather around the lake is cool year-round.
