= Battle of Sampagha Pass (1619) =

Battle of Sampagha pass
- Part of Mughal-Afghan Wars
Date	1619 or 1620
Location	Tirah, Mughal Empire (present-day Tirah, Pakistan)
Result	Afghan victory

Belligerents
Roshani movement Orakzai; Daulatzai	Mughal Empire

Commanders and leaders
Ihdad; Malik Tor; Malik Asghar	Ghairat Khan †; Jalal Khan Gakhar †; Masud Khan †; Bejzan †; Mahabat Khan

Strength
Unknown	Unknown

Casualties and losses
Unknown	Heavy; ~5,000 horses captured

The Battle of Sampagha pass or the Battle of Tirah took place in 1619 between the forces of the Mughal Empire under Mahabat Khan and the tribal followers of the Roshani movement led by Ihdad and his Orakzai allies in the Tirah Valley. The battle resulted in a decisive defeat for the Mughals, marking one of the most significant Pashtun victories against Mughal incursions during the reign of Emperor Jahangir.

== Background ==
In the latter part of the sixteenth century, Bayazid Ansari, established his base in Tirah and founded the Roshani movement, a socio-religious and political movement that challenged Mughal authority in the frontier regions. His followers, known as Roshniyas, settled among the Orakzai, particularly the Ismailzai, Lashkarzai, and Daulatzai clans.

Following the death of Bayazid, his son Jalala continued the struggle against the Mughals with the support of the Orakzai. Jalala was later succeeded by his nephew and son-in-law, Ihdad, who consolidated his position in Tirah. During the reign of Emperor Jahangir, Mahabat Khan, then Subedar of Kabul, was tasked with suppressing Ihdad’s growing influence among the Tirah tribes.

Mahabat Khan allied with the Bangash Khans of Hangu, who treacherously massacred around 300 Orakzai notables including the family of Malik Asghar Daulatzai under the pretext of awarding them khilats. Only Malik Asghar and his cousin Malik Tor survived. In response, Asghar relinquished the chieftainship to Malik Tor, and the Orakzai, anticipating a Mughal offensive, fortified the passes leading into Tirah.

== Battle ==
Mahabat Khan dispatched a large force under Ghairat Khan and twenty-two Mughal officers through the Kohat route to attack the Orakzai positions. The Mughals encamped near the Ismailzai territory at the foot of the Loe Sang-Pajzah Pass. Ignoring the cautious advice of his deputy, Jalal Khan, Ghairat Khan launched a frontal assault on the tribal defenses held by the Daulatzai.

As the Mughals climbed toward the crest of the pass, they were surrounded by the Pashtun defenders who had assembled from across the Tirah hills. In the ensuing melee, Ghairat Khan’s horse was hamstrung, and he was unseated. A Daulatzai warrior named Panju of the Firoz Khel clan grappled with Ghairat Khan, calling out to his comrades, “Strike! Kill me along with him, only do not let him escape!” Both were killed, locked in combat.

The death of Ghairat Khan triggered panic among the Mughals. Jalal Khan Gakhar, Masud (son of Ahmad Baig Khan), Bejzan (son of Nad Ali), and other commanders were slain as the Orakzai showered them with stones and arrows from the heights. The Mughal force collapsed in disarray, suffering massive casualties. Around 5,000 horses were captured by the Orakzai,

== Aftermath ==
Upon hearing of the defeat, Mahabat Khan sent reinforcements to stabilize the situation and strengthen the Mughal garrisons in the region. However, his forces failed to subdue the tribal resistance. According to Khushal Khan Khattak, “The Mughals could affect nothing, and Mahabat was recalled.” The victory at Tirah reinforced the Roshani influence among the Orakzai and other Pashtun tribes, prolonging resistance against Mughal expansion in the frontier.
