= Pir Roshan =

16th-century Ormur Sufi poet

- پیر روښان
- Born: Bāyazīd Khān Ansārī c. 1525; Jalandhar, Punjab, Lodi Sultanate (present-day Punjab, India)
- Died: between 1572–1578; Kalpani, near Mardan, Mughal Empire (present-day Khyber Pakhtunkhwa, Pakistan)
- Resting place: North Waziristan, Khyber Pakhtunkhwa, Pakistan
- Known for: Pashto literature Roshani movement Pashto alphabet
- Notable work: Khayr al-Bayān
- Spouse: Shamso
- Children: Sheikh Omar; Nuruddin; Khairuddin; Kamaluddin; Jalaluddin; Allahdad; Dawlatullah
- Father: Sheikh Abdullah

Bāyazīd Khān Ansārī (Pashto: بایزید خان انصاري; c. 1525–1572/1578), commonly known as Pīr Rōshān or Pīr Rōkhān, was an Ormur warrior, Sufi Pir and revolutionary leader. He is best known for founding the Roshani movement, which gained many followers in present-day Afghanistan and Pakistan, and produced a number of Pashto poets and writers. Pir Roshan wrote Khayr al-Bayān, one of the earliest known books containing Pashto prose, and also created the Pashto alphabet, derived from the Arabic script with 13 new letters. A modified version of this alphabet continues to be used to write Pashto. He wrote mostly in Pashto, but also in Persian, Urdu and Arabic, while his own mother tongue was Ormuri.

Pir Roshan assembled Pashtun tribesmen to fight against the Mughal emperor Akbar in response to Akbar's continuous military agitations. The Mughals referred to him as Pīr-e Tārīk (lit. 'master of darkness'), a play on the title given to him by his followers, Pīr Rōshān (lit. 'master of light'). Due to Pir Roshan's spiritual and religious hold over a large portion of Pashtuns, Akbar sought help of several religious figures into the struggle, most notably Pir Baba and Akhund Darweza. The Mughals persecuted his followers and executed many of them. A Mughal army eventually killed Pir Roshan and most of his sons. Only his youngest son, Pir Jalala, survived and later took up arms against the Mughals as the new leader of the Roshani movement. The Roshani followers in Waziristan, Kurram, Tirah, Loya Paktia, Loy Kandahar (including Kasi tribesmen), and Nangarhar continued their struggle against the Mughals for about a hundred years after Pir Roshan's death.

== Background ==
Bayazid was born in 1525 just outside Jalandhar in Punjab (present-day India), but early in his childhood, he moved with his family to their ancestral homeland of Kaniguram in South Waziristan (present-day Pakistan). He descended from a prominent family of Medina which traced its ancestry from Abu Ayyub al-Ansari, a companion of prophet Muhammad. His family was one of the many families who fled back to their ancestral land after the Turkic ruler Babur overthrew the Afghan Lodi dynasty in India in 1526. His grandfather was from the Lohgar Valley near Kabul in the country of the Barkis, but had immigrated to Waziristan, while his grandson was born in India. His father, Abdullah, was an Islamic Qadi (judge). However, his father and relatives, and later Bayazid himself, also traded between Afghanistan and India.

== Roshani movement ==
Bayazid began teaching at the age of 40. His message was well received by the Mohmand and Shinwari tribesmen. He then went to the Peshawar Valley and spread his message to the Khalil and Muhammadzai. He sent missionaries (khalifas) to various parts of South and Central Asia. He sent one of his disciples, Dawlat Khan, along with his book Sirat at-Tawhid to the Mughal emperor Akbar. Khalifa Yusuf was sent along with his book Fakhr at-Talibin to the ruler of Badakhshan, Mirza Sulayman. Mawdud Tareen was sent to propagate his message to Kandahar, Balochistan, and Sindh. Arzani Khweshki was sent to India to convey the message to common people there. Besides, he also sent his deputies to Kabul, Balkh, Bukhara, and Samarkand. However, when he and his followers started spreading their movement amongst the Yusufzais, Bayazid came into direct confrontation with the orthodox followers of Pir Baba in Buner. He established a base in the Tirah Valley where he rallied other tribes. In Oxford History of India, Vincent Smith describes this as the first "Pashtun renaissance" against the Mughal rule. When Mughal emperor Akbar proclaimed Din-i Ilahi, Bayazid raised the flag of open rebellion. He led his army in several successful skirmishes and battles against Mughal forces, but they were routed in a major battle in Nangarhar by Mughal General Muhsin Khan.

=== Battle of Aghazpur ===
The Battle of Aghazpur was the first major military confrontation between Bayazid and the Mughal forces, fought near Kalpani, close to present-day Shahbazgarhi in Mardan, Khyber Pakhtunkhwa. The battle was triggered after Mirza Hakim ordered Masum Khan, the Mughal governor of Peshawar, to arrest Bayazid. Tipped off in advance by two of his loyal disciples, Bahar Khan and Painda Khan of the Muhammadzai tribe, Bayazid fled from Hashtnagar toward Mardan, where the Mughal soldiers intercepted him. Despite being heavily outnumbered, Bayazid and his followers fought with exceptional bravery and defeated the Mughal army, inflicting heavy losses on their side. Bayazid himself named the battle "Aghazpur" as a symbol of his resolve against Mughal oppression. The victory proved to be a turning point in his life, as it inspired him to pursue his own independent authority over parts of the Afghan borderland. Emboldened by this success, he proceeded to Tirah with the help of the Afridis, established his independent rule there.

== Death ==
Following his defeat at Tora Ragha in Shinwari territory at the hands of Mohsin Khan's forces, Bayazid managed to escape the battlefield with the help of his loyal companions. However, the harsh conditions of the journey took a severe toll on him. Exhausted and overcome by extreme heat and thirst during his retreat, he fell gravely ill on his way toward Hashtnagar. He died at Kalpani, near what is now Mardan, around 980 A.H. (1572 A.D.). Historians differ on the precise year of his death Makhzan records it as 1573–74, while Tawarikh Hafiz Rahmat Khani places it as late as 1578.

== Aftermath ==
During the 1580s, Yusufzais rebelled against the Mughals and joined the Roshani movement of Pir Roshan. In late 1585, Akbar sent military forces under Zain Khan Koka and Birbal to crush the Roshani rebellion. In February 1586, about 8,000 Mughal soldiers, including Birbal, were killed near the Karakar Pass between Buner and Swat while fighting against the Yusufzai lashkar led by Kalu Khan. This was the greatest disaster faced by the Mughal army during Akbar's reign. However, during the attack, Pir Roshan was himself killed by the Mughal army near Topi. In 1587, Mughal general Man Singh I defeated 20,000 strong Roshani soldiers and 5,000 horsemen. Major Henry George Raverty transpired the account from Akhund Darweza about Pir Roshan's coffin was seized in the midst of a battle between the Roshaniyya and Mughal forces. Some of his bones were burnt, and cast into the Indus river. Pir Roshan's five sons, however, continued fighting against the Mughals until about 1640.

== Successors ==
Bayazid's sons were put to death with the exception of his youngest, Jalala, who was pardoned by Akbar as he was only 14 years old when he was captured. He later took up arms as Pir Jalala Khan and successfully engaged the Mughal armies.

As part of a concerted campaign to destroy the Roshanis around 1619 or 1620, Mahabat Khan, under the emperor Jahangir, massacred 300 Daulatzai Orakzai in the Tirah. Ghairat Khan was sent to the Tirah region to engage the Roshani forces with a large military force via Kohat. The Mughal forces were repulsed, but six years later Muzaffar Khan marched against Ahdad Khan. After several months of intense fighting, Ahdad Khan was killed. The death of Jahangir in 1627 led to a general uprising of the Pashtuns against Mughal forces. Ahdad's son Abdul Qadir returned to Tirah to seek vengeance. Under his command, the Roshani defeated Muzaffar Khan's forces en route from Peshawar to Kabul, killing Muzaffar. Abdul Qadir plundered Peshawar and invested the citadel. It was not until the time of Mughal emperor Shah Jahan (1628–1658) that a truce was brokered – between Akbar's grandson and Bayazid's great grandson.

== Legacy and assessment ==
The religious view of Pir Roshan was considered heretical by his contemporaries of Pashtun tribes from Khattak and Yusufzai.

Pir Roshan also originally wrote his Khair al-Bayan in Pashto, which meant that the text was more accessible to the Pashtuns than the Arabic Qur'an and that those followers took some measure of pride in its composition.

During the 19th century, orientalist scholars translating texts from Pashto and other regional texts termed his movement a "sect" which believed in the transmigration of souls and in the representation of God through individuals. Ideologically, history assessors with left-wing view has regarded him as reformer who fight against conservative value among Pashtuns during his era.

== See also ==
- Mullah Powindah
- Raj Wali Shah Khattak
