= Khayr al-Bayān =

1651 Pashto book by Pir Roshan

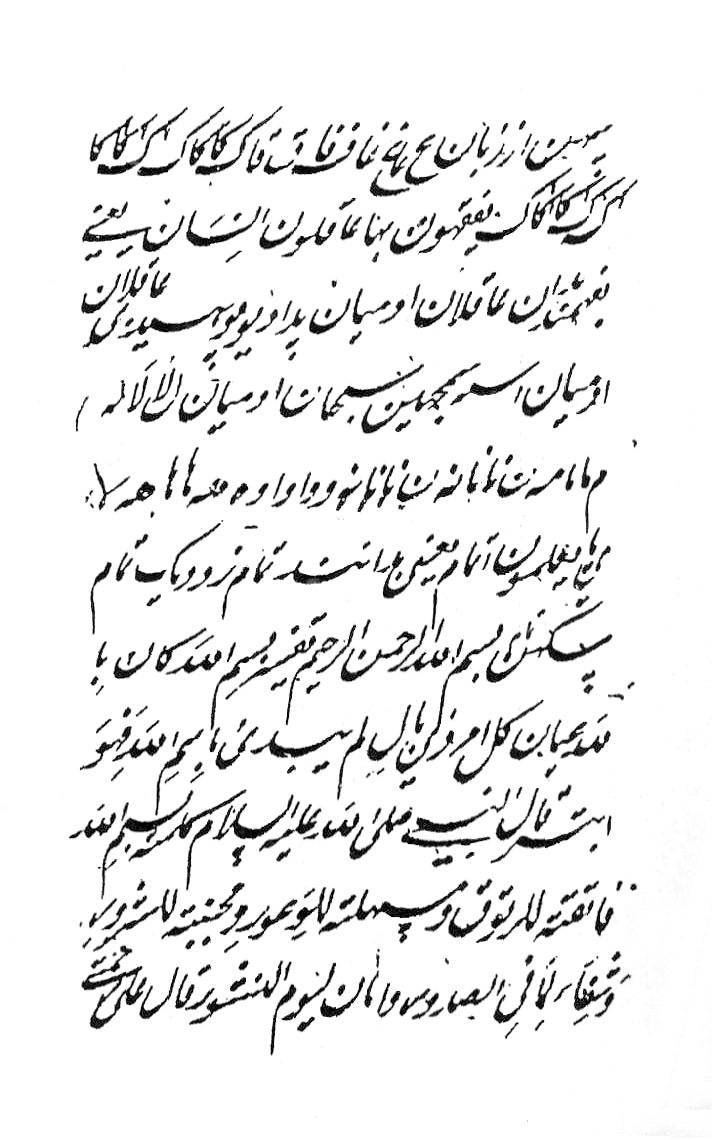
- Excerpt from Khayr al-Bayān
- Author: Pir Roshan
- Translator: Maulana Abdul Qadir
- Language: Pashto, Persian, Arabic, and Urdu
- Publication date: 6 September 1651
- OCLC: 39986966

Khayr al-Bayān is a book written by Pir Roshan. Khair al-Bayan is believed to be the first book in Pashto language, beginning Pashto literature. It was written in Pashto, Persian, Arabic, and Urdu, and is considered the first book of Pashto prose. The book was thought to be lost until an original handwritten Persian manuscript was found in the University of Tübingen, Germany. Maulana Abdul Qadir of Pashto Academy - University of Peshawar, obtained and translated it and published a Pashto edition in 1987.

== See also ==
- Anṣārī, Bāyazīd: Ḫair al-bayān, 1061 (1651), Digitalisierte Sammlungen der Staatsbibliothek zu Berlin
