= Mahabat Khan =

Mughal Subahdar of Malwa (1611–1623) and Bengal (1625–1626)

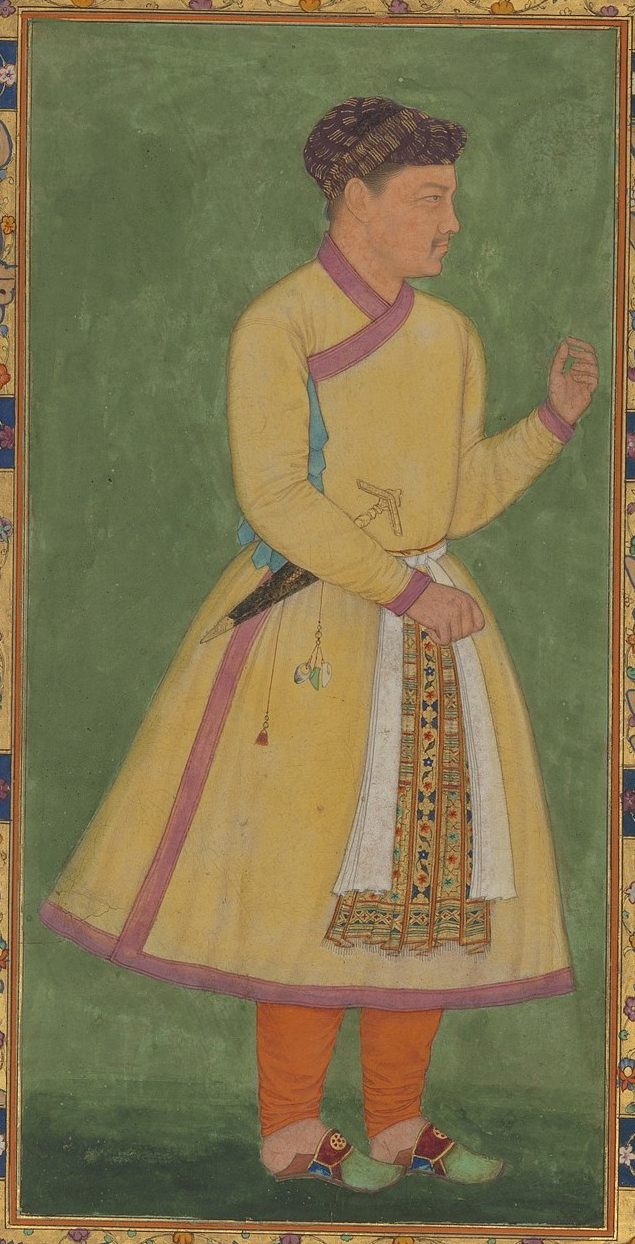

Subahdar of Malwa Subah
- In office 1611–1623

15th Subahdar of Bengal
- In office 20 April 1624 – 1626
- Monarch: Jahangir
- Preceded by: Ibrahim Khan I
- Succeeded by: Khan Jahan II

Personal details
- Born: Zamana-beg Kabuli Kabul, Kabul Subah, Mughal Empire (modern day Afghanistan)
- Died: October 1634
- Children: Khan Zaman; Mahabat Khan II
- Parent: Ghayur Beg Kabuli (father)

Military service
- Battles/wars: Battle of Sampagha Pass (1619); Siege of Daulatabad; Siege of Parenda (1634)

Mahabat Khan (Urdu: مهابت خان) (full title Mahabat Khan Khan-e-Khanan Sipah-Salar Zamana Beg Kabuli), born Zamana Beg (died October 1634), was a prominent Mughal general and statesman, perhaps best known for his coup against the Mughal Emperor Jahangir in 1626. He also served as the Subahdar of Malwa Subah from 1611 to 1623 and Bengal Subah during 1625–1626. He earned the title Khan-i-Khanan from emperor Shah Jahan. He was a disciple of Mujadid Alif Sani Sheikh Ahmad Sirhindi, and led a revolt against Mughal Emperor Jahangir due to his imprisonment of the Mujadid Alif Sani.

== Early life ==
Born Zamana Beg, Khan's father was Ghiwar Beg Kabuli who came to India from Kabul. He was of Persian origin.

== Career in the Mughal Army ==
Upon entering the Mughal service, Zamana Beg enjoyed a rapid ascent through the ranks of the Mughal army. He began his military career in the personal forces of Crown Prince Salim (who later went on to become Emperor Jahangir). Having endeared himself to the crown prince, he was soon made an officer in charge of 500 men. Prince Salim sent him to Malik Ambar to remove the campaign of Prince Daniyal in the Deccan. He also led Salim’s army during the Rajputana campaign in Mewar. Mahabat Khan was gifted a concubine from Mewar; she died in childbirth.

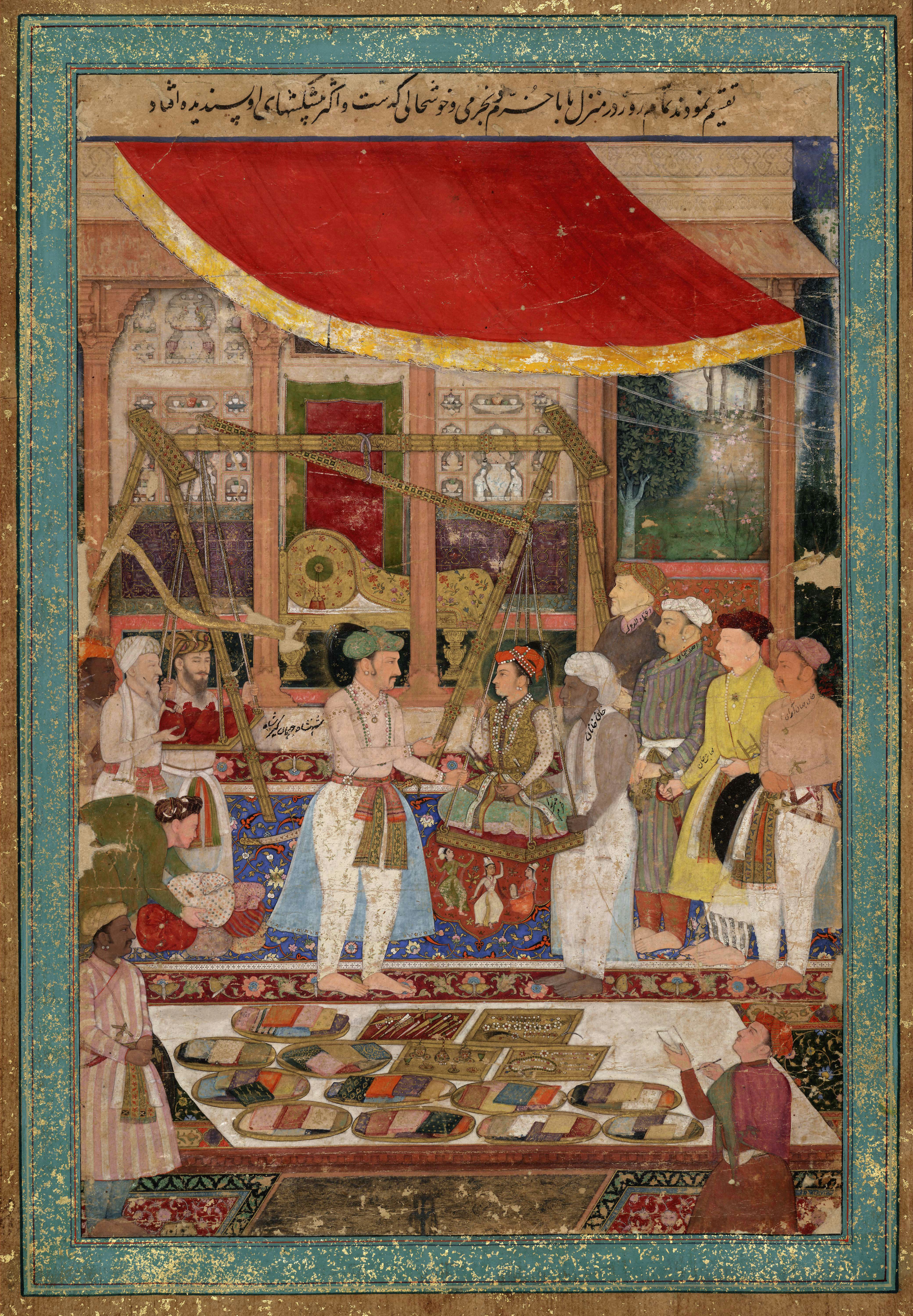
Jahangir weighing prince Khurram (later Shah Jahan) against gold and silver in the presence of Mahabat Khan and Khan Jahan.

Upon Jahangir's rise to the throne in 1605, he was granted the honorific title Mahabat Khan, and was promoted to the rank of commander of 1,500 men, and bakhshi (treasurer) of the emperor's private privy purse.

As part of a concerted campaign to destroy the Roshani movement around 1619 or 1620, Mahabat Khan, under the Emperor Jahangir, massacred 300 Daulatzai Orakzai in the Tirah. The Afghans then defeated Mahabat Khan at the Battle of Sampagha Pass

Mahabat Khan rose to prominence in 1623, when he was made commander of the Mughal forces sent to defeat the unsuccessful rebellion of Prince Khurram (who later went on to become Emperor Shah Jahan) in the Deccan. He also performs many 'dirty works' for emperor Jahangir For his loyal service, he was recognised as a 'pillar of the state'. and was ultimately promoted to chief commander of the Mughal army, with a personal force of 7,000 men.

== Rebellion ==
Mahabat Khan's success in quelling Prince Khurram's rebellion was not met with pleasure by many members of the Mughal court, who began to fear and resent the general's growing prestige and influence. Empress Nur Jahan was especially concerned, and in an effort to curb Mahabat Khan's rising power, she arranged to have him made governor of Bengal, a province far removed from the Mughal capital at Lahore. Furthermore, in an effort to humiliate him in the imperial court, Nur Jahan had him charged with disloyal conduct and ordered him to return to Lahore to face trial. As a result of Nur Jahan's machinations against him, Mahabat Khan decided to take action, and so in 1626, he led an army of loyal Rajput soldiers to the Punjab. He had also brought the wives and families of many of them, so that, if driven to extremity, they would fight to the last for the lives and honour of themselves and their families . Meanwhile, Jahangir and his retinue were preparing to head to Kabul, and were encamped on the banks of the River Jhelum. Mahabat Khan and his forces attacked the royal encampment, and successfully took the emperor hostage; Nur Jahan, however, managed to escape. Mahabat Khan declared himself emperor of India at Kabul, however his success was short-lived.

Nur Jahan, with the help of nobles who were still loyal to Jahangir, came up with a plan to free her husband. She surrendered herself to Mahabat Khan, and once reunited with her husband, put her plan into action. She had Jahangir convince Mahabat Khan that he was satisfied with the current arrangement, as it had freed him from her clutches. Mahabat Khan believed that he had won over the former emperor, failing to realise that Jahangir was in fact siding with Nur Jahan. Consequently, he decreased the Rajput guards that he had placed around Jahangir, and prepared to return to Lahore with the captive emperor. Meanwhile, Nur Jahan arranged for an army to meet them en route to Lahore; in the ensuing battle, Nur Jahan's forces were victorious, and Jahangir was freed from captivity. Mahabat Khan with the help of Raja Nathu Mall of Majhauli settled the remaining wounded Rajputs and their families in the forests of Gorakhpur, Uttar Pradesh. Thus Mahabat Khan's brief reign lasted approximately 100 days.

== Later life and death ==
Following his unsuccessful coup, Khan fled to the Deccan. There, Prince Khurram convinced him to surrender himself to Jahangir. However, with the death of Jahangir shortly thereafter in October 1627, Khan went unpunished. Upon Prince Khurram's rise to the throne as Emperor Shah Jahan, Mahabat Khan was appointed governor of Ajmer. He was later appointed governor of the Deccan, and successfully commanded the siege of Daulatabad in 1633. In 1634 he unsuccessfully besieged the fort of Parenda, and died in October the same year. At the time of his death, he held a rank of 7000/7000, making him the highest-ranking Mughal noble of non-royal blood. His body was carried back to Delhi, where he was buried on the ground of the shrine of Qadam Sharif. Upon death, his eldest son, Mirza Amanullah, was awarded the title 'Khan Zaman', while his second son, Luhrasp, was granted his late father's title, Mahabat Khan.

== Popular culture ==
=== Films and television ===
- In the 2005 Hindi film Taj Mahal: An Eternal Love Story, he was portrayed by Milind Gunaji.
- In the 2014 historical drama series Siyaasat aired on The EPIC Channel, he is portrayed by Omkar Kapoor.
- In the 2023 ZEE5's web series Taj: Divided by Blood, he is portrayed by Arman Khera.
