= Akhund Darweza =

Sufi and Islamic scholar (1533 - 1638)

- آخوند درویزہ

Personal life
- Born: 1533 Buner
- Died: 1638 (aged 104–105)
- Resting place: Peshawar; 33.9964637°N 71.5935475°E

Religious life
- Religion: Islam
- Profession: Sufi; Islamic scholar

Muslim leader
- Disciple of: Pir Baba

Akhund Darweza Baba (1533 - 1638) was a Tajik Sufi and Islamic scholar and one of the caliphs of Sayyid Ali Tirmizi.

Darweza's mother Abida Faqir Qarari was the great-grand-daughter of Sultan Qiran Gibari, a Sultan of Swat belonging to Swati tribe.

== Early life and education ==
Darweza was born in 1533 to Shaikh Gadai somewhere in Buner District. He had a zeal for religion since childhood. He failed to get a proper education but later he went to make up for his shortcomings and learn Sufism from a few religious scholars like Syed Mesar Ahmad, Mullah Zangi and Mullah Sanjar. He also traveled to Hindustan for knowledge. Akhund met Sayyid Ali Tirmizi (Pir Baba) between 1552 and 1554 through his teacher Mullah Sanjar. Then took the oath of allegiance and received training of Sufism and later became Pir Baba’s caliph.

== Opposition to Pir Roshan ==
Along with Pir Baba they considered a religious duty to protect the Pashtuns from Bayazid Ansari's religious beliefs. And had several debates with him.

== Literary works ==
- Noor Nama Maa Shamayil Nama (Pashto)
- Tazkira tul-Abrar val-Ashrar (Farsi)
- Makhzan E Islam (Pashto) - an old Manuscript
