= Pabaini =

Coordinates: 34°09′N 72°36′E

Pabaini Pashto: پابينى Urdu: پابينى
- Madron Village
- Interactive map of Pabaini
- Country: Pakistan
- Province: Khyber-Pakhtunkhwa
- District: Swabi
- Tehsil: Swabi
- Union Council: Pabaini
- Population: 20,000 approximately

Pabaini or Pabeni Pashto: پابينى Urdu: پابينى is a village in the Swabi District of Khyber Pukhtunkhwa in Pakistan. It is situated about 13 kilometers from Swabi city. It has a population of 20,000 according to a 2007 estimate.

== History ==
Although there is no authentic history about the formation of Pabaini however it is believed that in the late 16th century some of the people of Leron village intruded on the land currently known as Pabaini. In Pabaini the most common people are jadoon. In 1865 Gadoon was tribal area and Pabaini was also part of Gadoon but in 1870 Pabaini become part of swabi tehsil

== Location ==
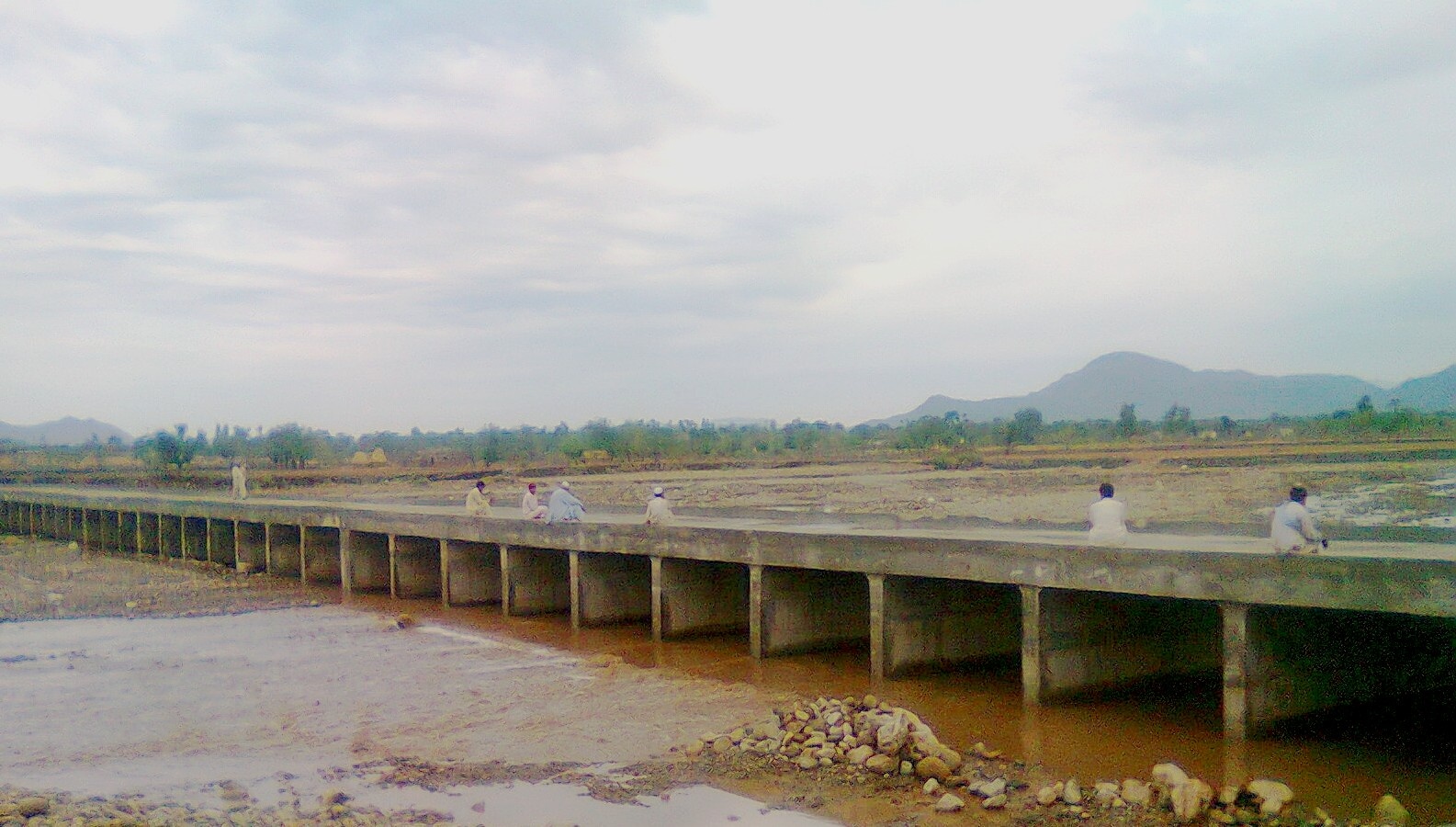
Imran Bridge "Gate Way of Pabaini"

Pabaini is a large village in Kandaw Valley. It lies in the east side of Jhanda. Panjman village lies in the north west of Pabaini and Qadra and Gajai in north. Malak abad is in north east, Gadoon Industrial Estate is in south east and Maini village in south. The Village Boko lies to the South-West of Panjman and is about 9 km away from Swabi City.

Serai is the taxi stand and main bazaar of the village. Where all the villagers and northern neighbor villagers come for basic shopping.

== Education ==
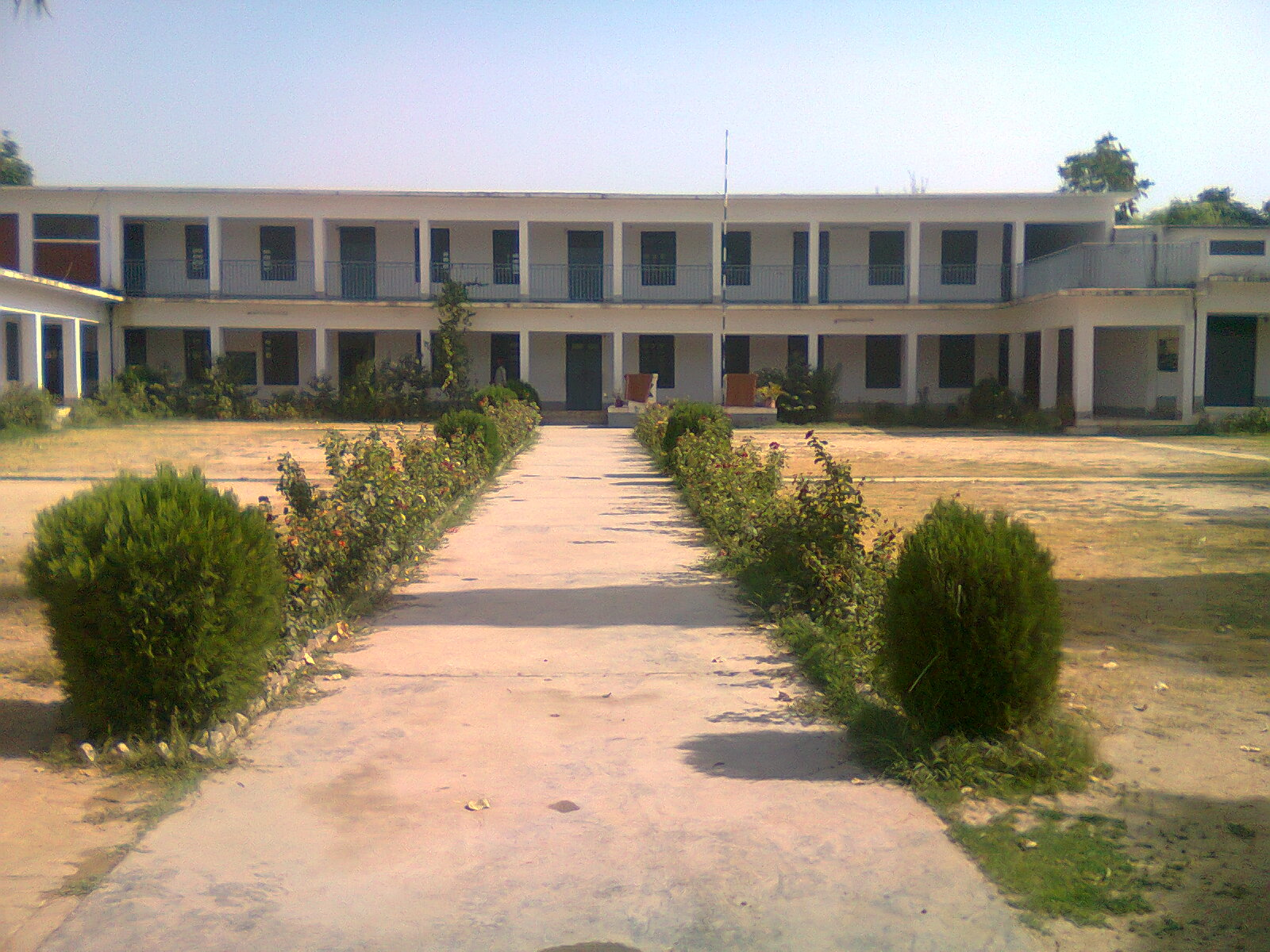
Government High School Pabaini (boys)

Education is growing fast in Pabaini now day, but its ratio is still less than the 70%. Educational Institute in Pabaini

- Government High School Pabaini (boys)
- Government Higher secondary School Pabaini (girls)
- Government Primary School Maini lar (boys)
- Government Primary School Maini lar (girls) * Government Primary School Urya khel (boys)
- Government Primary School Said Shah Garhi (boys)
- Government Primary School Tulko (boys
- Bacha Khan Primary School maini lar (boys & girls)
- Shaheen Model Public School Serai (boys & girls)
- Four Basic Education Community Center (boys & girls)
- Paragon Model School Pabaini. (boys & girls)
- govt primary school no.4 pabaini (boys)
- govt primary school uryakhel (girls)

== Sports ==
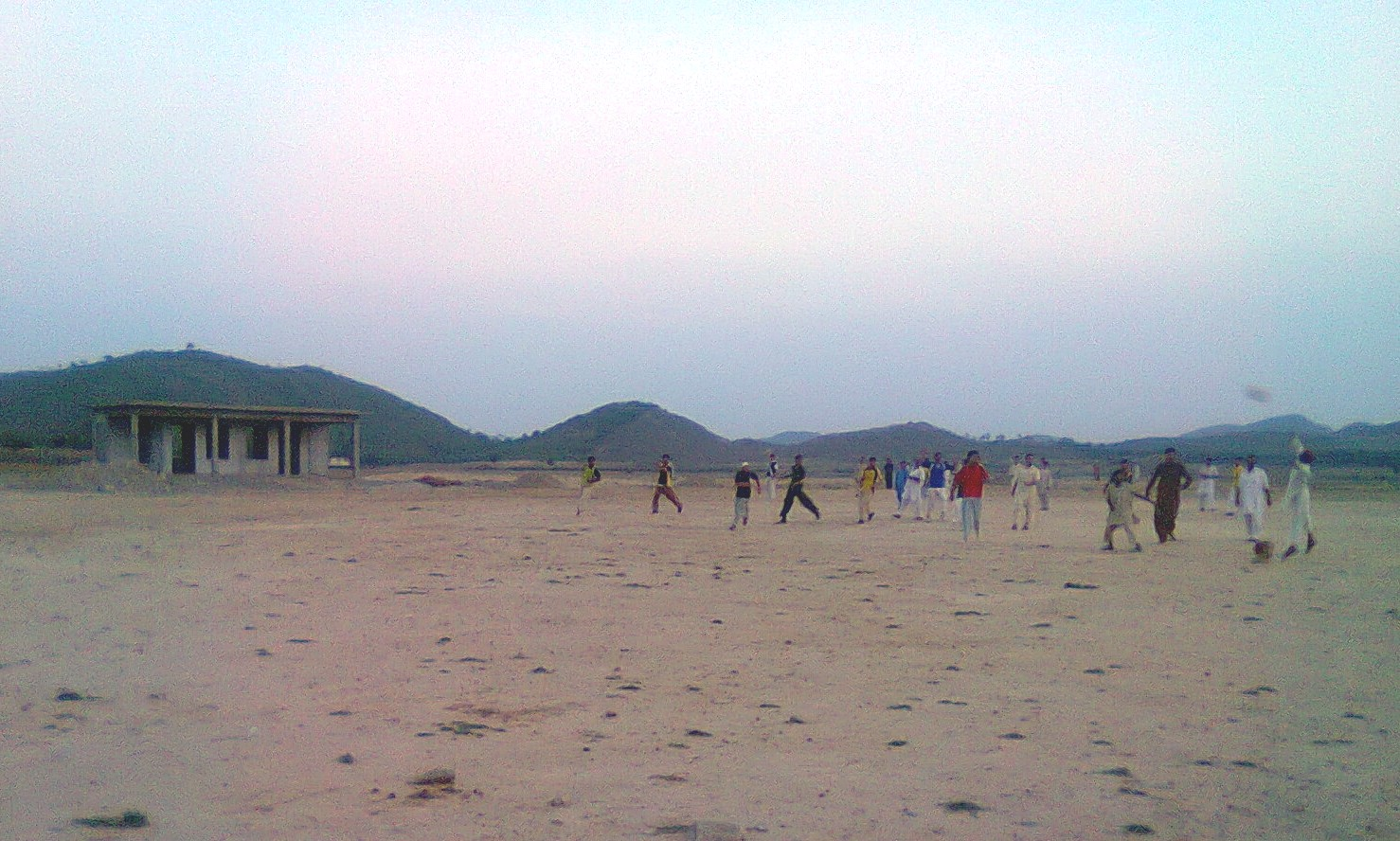
Sitara Ayaz Sports Complex Pabaini

The people of pabaini play many games. The young boys play cricket, football and badminton. There are also some other folk games like Makha which is most popular game of Pabaini is also played in the village. Through the provincial government fund a cricket ground was built. This ground is named with the popular late cricket player of the village pabaini Muhammad Sheraz Shaheed.
