= Roshani movement =

16th-century Sufi movement amongst Pashtun tribes

The Rōshānī movement (Pashto: روښاني غورځنګ, lit. 'The enlightened movement' or The Illuminati) was a populist, nonsectarian Sufi movement that was founded in the mid-16th century, in the Pashtunistan region of present-day Pakistan and Afghanistan, and arose among the Pashtun tribes. The movement was founded by Pir Roshan, an Ormur warrior, Sufi poet and revolutionary.

Described as heterodoxical movement with Millenarianism view, This Sufi was group popular with the Pashtun populations in the northwestern regions of the Mughal Empire. The movement itself was a challenge to Pashtun tribal society, and its purpose was to raise issues of leadership, authority, and social ethics.

The Roshaniyya movement went through three phases: the first phase lasted from 1565 to 1585, the second phase from 1585 to 1605, and the third phase from 1605 to 1632.

== Overview ==
Pir Roshan challenged the inequality and social injustice that he saw being practiced by the ruling powers of the Mughal Empire and advocated for a system of egalitarian codes and tenets that his followers, the Roshaniyya, promulgated within Islam. Roshan preached a life of poverty, fasting, and remembrance of God which appealed to the poorer classes of Kaniguram. The millenarian quality of his messages came through his emphasis on the renunciation of worldly pursuits and on the imminence of the day of resurrection. Pir Roshan educated and instructed followers of the movement through new and radical teachings that questioned basic Islamic canons during that time, and propagated egalitarian principles. He developed republican-esque composition which blended with Sufi interpretations of Islamic sharia Law, an idea which considered radical by religious establishment of his time. Researcher Saifur Rehman Masud has concluded that Pir Roshan's ultimate motivation was the unity of Pashtuns under a single ideology which combine religion and politics. Pir Roshan wanted his followers to embrace the idea of Sufi thoughts that he called tariqat and haqiqat. By doing so, Pir Roshan brought together Pashtun tribes from Kandahar to Nangarhar under his slogan which says wahdat, qurbat and waslat (lit. oneness, unity and nearness).

Roshan's millenarian message of repentance and preparation for the Day of Judgement struck a particularly sympathetic chord in the religious sensibilities of Pashtuns. Pashtuns were also attracted to his more mystical approach to religion that deemphasized outward practices of the shari'at. His teachings resonated among the Afridi, Orakzai, Khalil, Mohmand, and Bangash tribes.

The group achieved strong influence and authority among the eastern Pashtun tribes and played a significant role in Pashtun history and in the policy of the Mughal Empire on its western frontiers. Since Pashtun tribesmen have traditionally considered religious law and religious leaders to be at odds with tribal law or Pashtunwali, they may have been attracted to Roshan's particular emphasis on mysticism at the expense of the shari'at and his condemnation of the religious establishment. However, by accepting Roshan's message and Bayazid, they simply swapped one religious leader for another. Furthermore, some tribal sardars viewed the Roshaniyya movement as a source of possible strength for themselves within their own intratribal rivalries.

Poorer individuals, lineages, and tribes were attracted to Bayazid's teachings about the need for prayer, fasting, and poverty in preparation for the Day of Judgement, because it gave meaning to their lives. Also, those who were attracted to Bayazid's assertion that anyone who failed to adhere to the movement could be prosecuted as an infidel and that such person's lands and possessions would be plundered.

== History ==
Bayazid Ansari was born in 1525, and had an early experience of victimization at the hands of the Mughals that persisted throughout his lifetime and ultimately led to his leadership of an insurrection against the Mughal government in Kabul. At a young age, Bayazid was sent to master the Qur'an and through his studies he became more devout in his worship of God. He was educated, well-traveled, familiar with mysticism, and had firsthand experience with resentment of the Afghans over the Mughal monopoly of political and military power. For a few years during his studies, he attained what he considered to be union with God but kept his mystical experiences to himself.

Eventually, he began to accept disciples. As his disciples grew, the local ulama and Sufi pirs claimed Roshan and his disciples were frauds who sought worldly wealth and knew nothing of true religion. When asked which Sufi tradition he followed, he responded that he followed the divine tradition.

In the late 1560s while living in Hashtnaghar (present-day Khyber Pakhtunkhwa, Pakistan), Roshan sent his disciples with letters calling on people to join the movement, and accept him as a perfect guide.

A turning point for the movement happened in 1570 when the Tu'i tribe in Nangrahar, which had accepted Roshan as the Pir-e-Kaamil, attacked a caravan and plundered it. When Roshan got word that the caravan had been attacked, he sent an apology to Mirza Hakin in Kabul. Yet, Mirza Hakim's councilors had convinced him that Roshan was responsible for the actions of the Tu'i tribe and sent a farman to either kill or capture Roshan.

Shortly before his death and after spending time in hiding and on the run, Roshan helped the Afridis and Orakza'is drive the Tirahis from Tirah.

=== Roshani second Insurrection ===
According to Antoni de Montserrat, a Portuguese Jesuit who visited India furing the rule of Mughal Empire, , Following the death of Bayazid, Jalal-ad-Din (also known as Jalala), son of Pir Roshan, took the leadership of Roshani movement following the death of his father. He first went to Tirah, where he organized the Afridi and Orakza'i tribes in an outbreak of violence. The Afridis and Orakza'i attacked and plundered caravans, performed raids, and killed Afghans, Mughals, and Hindus indiscriminately. This provoked counter-attacks and after a series of defeats, many tribesmen deserted Jalala and he fled from Tirah to the Yusufza'is. In 1601, twenty years after assuming leadership of the Roshaniyya movement, Jalala and the Roshanis went to the aid of the Lohani Pashtuns in Ghazni. The Hazaras of that area however, attacked the Lohanis and when the Lohanis appealed to the Roshanis, they attacked the Roshanis too. Jalala was later succeeded by his nephew and son-in-law, Ihdad, who consolidated his position in Tirah. Mahabat Khan, then Subedar of Kabul, was tasked with suppressing Ihdad’s growing influence among the Tirah tribes.

In 1619, at the Battle of Sampagha Pass, The Mughals suffered a loss with massive casualties against the Roshani. Around 5,000 horses were captured by the Orakzai,

In 1630, a grandson of Pir Roshan named Abdul Qadir launched attacks on the Mughal army in Peshawar. Thousands of Pashtuns from the Bangash, Afridi, Mohmand, Kheshgi, Yusufzai, and other tribes took part. The Roshanis failed in the attack, but continued their resistance against the Mughals throughout the 17th century.

== Legacy ==
Bayazid's emphasis on the ascetic life, mysticism, and repentance in anticipation of the Day of Judgement were themes that attracted numerous people and provoked an initially positive reaction from Afghan tribesmen. During Bayazid's lifetime and position as leader of the movement, the pantheistic Sufi character of the Roshaniyya movement and its mass millenarian appeal were overwhelming. After Bayazid's death in 1575 the pantheistic Sufi character of the movement became less and less prominent.

Roshaniyya doctrines were more mystical and less overtly legal, which made them more attractive to Afghans who found the shari'at to conflict with the tribal customs of Pashtunwali. The biggest challenge of the Roshaniyya movement to Pashtun tribal society happened when religious leaders competed with traditional lineage headmen for leadership of the tribesmen.
