= Motto Tunnel =

Tunnel in Abbottabad, Pakistan

Overview
- Location: Ayubia National Park, Abbottabad District, Khyber Pakhtunkhwa, Pakistan
- Status: Open

Operation
- Constructed: 1891; 135 years ago
- Opened: 29 October 2020 (renovated)
- Owner: Ministry of Climate Change and KP’s wildlife department
- Operator: Ministry of Climate Change and KP’s wildlife department
- Traffic: Pedestrians

Technical
- Length: 76 m

Moto Tunnel is a historic tunnel situated within Ayubia National Park in Abbottabad District, Khyber Pakhtunkhwa, Pakistan. It was constructed in 1891. A revitalization effort was undertaken in October 2020 to return the tunnel to its original state.

== History ==
While excavating a pit for a plantation within Ayubia National Park in northern Pakistan, workers stumbled upon an unexpected discovery—a century-old British-era tunnel. The historical tunnel constructed in 1891, had been buried under a heap of refuse due to negligence. However, through efforts led by the Ministry of Climate Change, the tunnel was meticulously restored to its former magnificence. It was officially inaugurated on 29 October 2020 by Malik Amin Aslam, the Special Assistant to the Prime Minister on Climate Change.

In a collaborative effort, the Climate Change, Forestry, Environment & Wildlife Department, Khyber Pakhtunkhwa joined forces to meticulously renovate and return the 'Moto Tunnel' to its former splendor. Recognizing its archaeological importance, the tunnel has been established as a cultural and heritage emblem. This restoration project was carried out under the umbrella of the Global Environment Facility and the United Nations Development Programme's (UNDP) Sustainable Forest Management initiative.
