= Battle of Malandari Pass =

Afghan-Mughal War battle

Battle of the Malandari Pass (1586)
- Part of Mughal–Afghan Wars
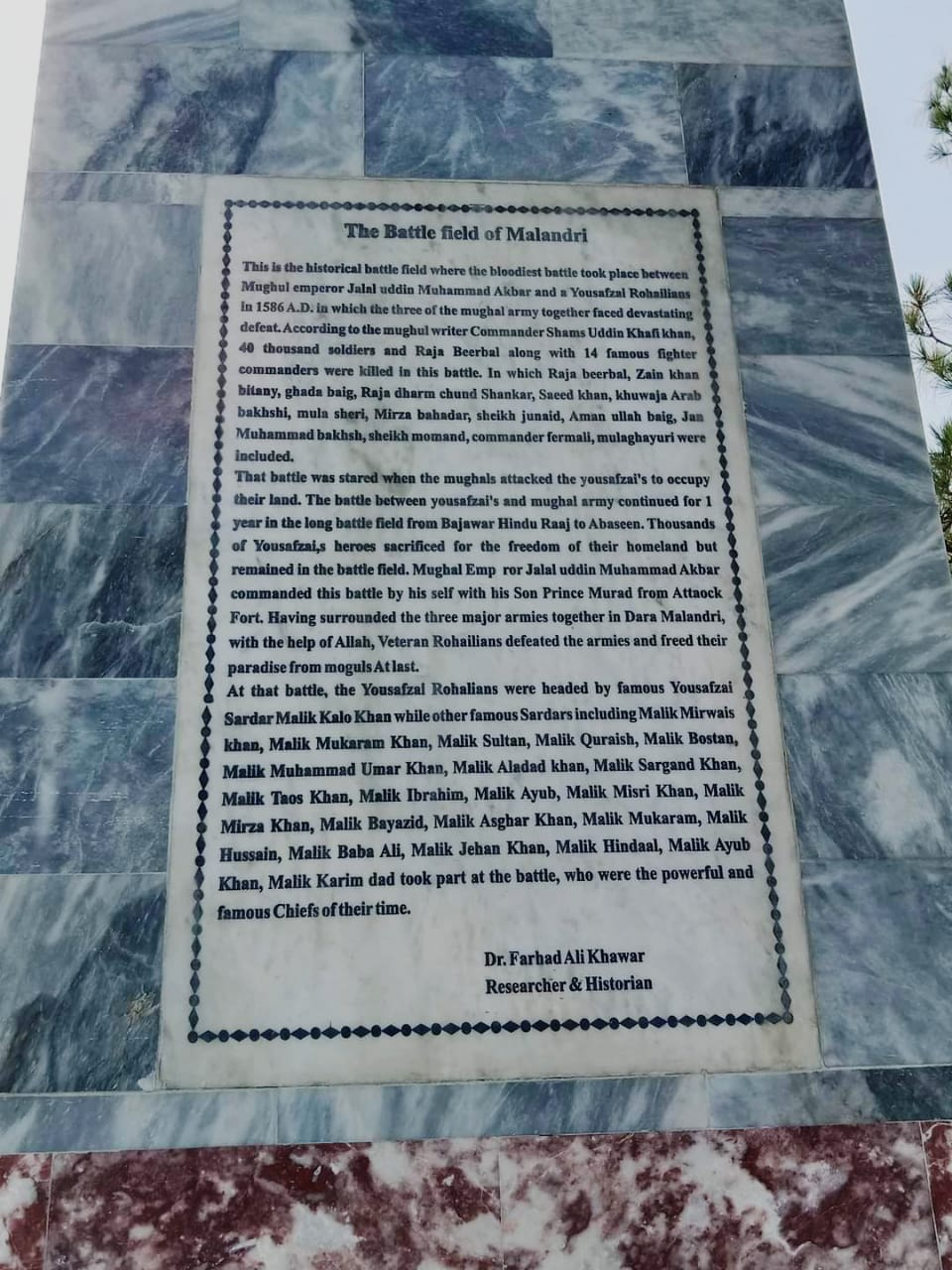
- Battle of Malandari Monument in Buner
Date	16 February 1586
Location	Buner, Between Karakar Pass and Malandari Pass (in present day Pakistan)
Result	Afghan Yousufzai victory

Belligerents
Afghan people: Yousafzai tribe; Jadoon tribe	Mughal Empire

Commanders and leaders
Kalu Khan Yousafzai; Mirwais Khan	Birbal †; Zain Khan Koka

Strength
Unknown	20,000

Casualties and losses
Unknown	8,000 (Badayuni's claim) with 500 officers killed.

The Battle of the Malandari Pass was fought on 16 February 1586 in what is now the Buner District in Pakistan's Khyber Pakhtunkhwa Province. The army of the Mughal Empire, led by Raja Birbal, was ambushed by Pashtun Yusufzai tribesmen, led by Malik Kalu Khan Yousafzai. It was one of the greatest defeats of Mughal history and under the reign of Akbar the Great. (Note: John F. Richards fails to specifically refer to it as the Battle of Malandari Pass, but instead states Raja Bir Bar and Zain Khan Koka commanded an army against Yusufzai chiefs and it was the greatest disaster to befall a Mughal army during Akbar's reign.)

Birbal is believed to have died in the battle alongside around 8,000 Mughal soldiers.

== Background ==
The Mughals had annihilated the whole Yousafzai tribe after Mullah Meru's defeat and death in 1581 AD, and Kalu Khan Yusufzai decided to take over the task of restoring the Yousafzai's organisation and unity. In the jirga that Yousafzai organised after consulting his friends and supporters, Ayub son of Rusi, Babu son of Saifu Aba Khel Mandanr, Mirwais son of Mullah Meru, and other individuals associated with Yousafzai took part. Yousafzai's country was visited by this jirga as it preached about togetherness and issued ominous warnings about the consequences of divide.

Ain-i-Akbari claims that Kalu Khan travelled to Agra when the Mughal Emperor Akbar went to the Kabul region to chastise Mirza Muhammad. Kalu Khan was treated well, but he eventually left Agra. Khwaja Shamsuddin Khwafi detained Kalu Khan close to Attock and then took him to court. Kalu Khan ran away once more, went back home, and eventually became the leader of the seditious elements. Abu Fazal does not specifically state how Akbar took Kalu Khan to Agra or why or under what circumstances.

The Yousafzai had selected Ghazi Khan Malezai to serve as their leader while Kalu Khan was away. But soon after, Ghazi Khan was killed in Bajaur in a battle with the Mughals. Kalu Khan, who had just returned from Agra, also joined the fight. He was once again chosen by Yousafzais to lead the tribe in Damghar, Swat.

== Battle ==
According to historians Jadunath Sarkar and Raghubir Sinh, there were quarrels between the leaders of the Mughal troops, with Birbal, Abul Fath and Zain Khan disagreeing on the course of action, and "On 16th February, (1586), during a disorderly march, the Afghans attacked in a Swat defile. Panic seized the disunited Imperial army and 8000 men lost their lives, including Rajah Birbal and many other high officers, while all their camp and equipage were plundered. The fugitives straggling in the hills were cut off."

Between the Karakar Pass and the Malandari Pass, the Yusufzai Afghans under the command of Kalu Khan routed the combined forces of Zain Khan and Raja Birbal. Birbal lost his life in this battle. According to Mughal historian Khafi Khan, 40,000–50,000 Mughal men perished in this battle. However, Badayuni claims that around 8000 Mughal men perished as a result of the entire episode.

== Aftermath ==
Akbar learned about the disaster two days later and an army under Rajah Todar Mal set off on 19 February to exact retribution against the Yusufzais, killing a large number of them and selling many survivors to Turan and Persia, as "the countries of Swat, Bajaur and Buner were cleansed of evildoers."
