= Karakar Tunnel =

Tunnel between Buner and Swat

Karakar Tunnel کڑاکڑ ٹنل

Overview
- Location: Khyber Pakhtunkhwa, Pakistan
- Crosses: Karakar Mountain of Hindu Kush

Operation
- Work began: 2021

Technical
- Length: 2.1 km (1 1/4 mi)

Karakar Tunnel is an under-construction 2 km long tunnel connecting Buner to Swat District. The tunnel will shortcut the 11 km long distance of Karakar Pass to 3 km.
