= Zalam Kot Twin Tube Tunnel =

Overview
- Location: Khyber Pakhtunkhwa, Pakistan

Technical
- Design engineer: Frontier Works Organization (FWO)
- Length: 1.3 km (3/4 mi)

Zalam Kot Twin Tube Tunnel is the 1,300 meters long twin-tube tunnel a part of Swat Expressway located near Chakdara. The tunnel were constructed by Frontier Works Organization (FWO).

In July 2018 Chief of Army Staff (COAS) General Qamar Javed Bajwa visited the tunnel when it was under construction.
