= Elum Ghar =

Mountain in Khyber Pakhtunkhwa, Pakistan

Coordinates: 34.6197°N 72.3310°E

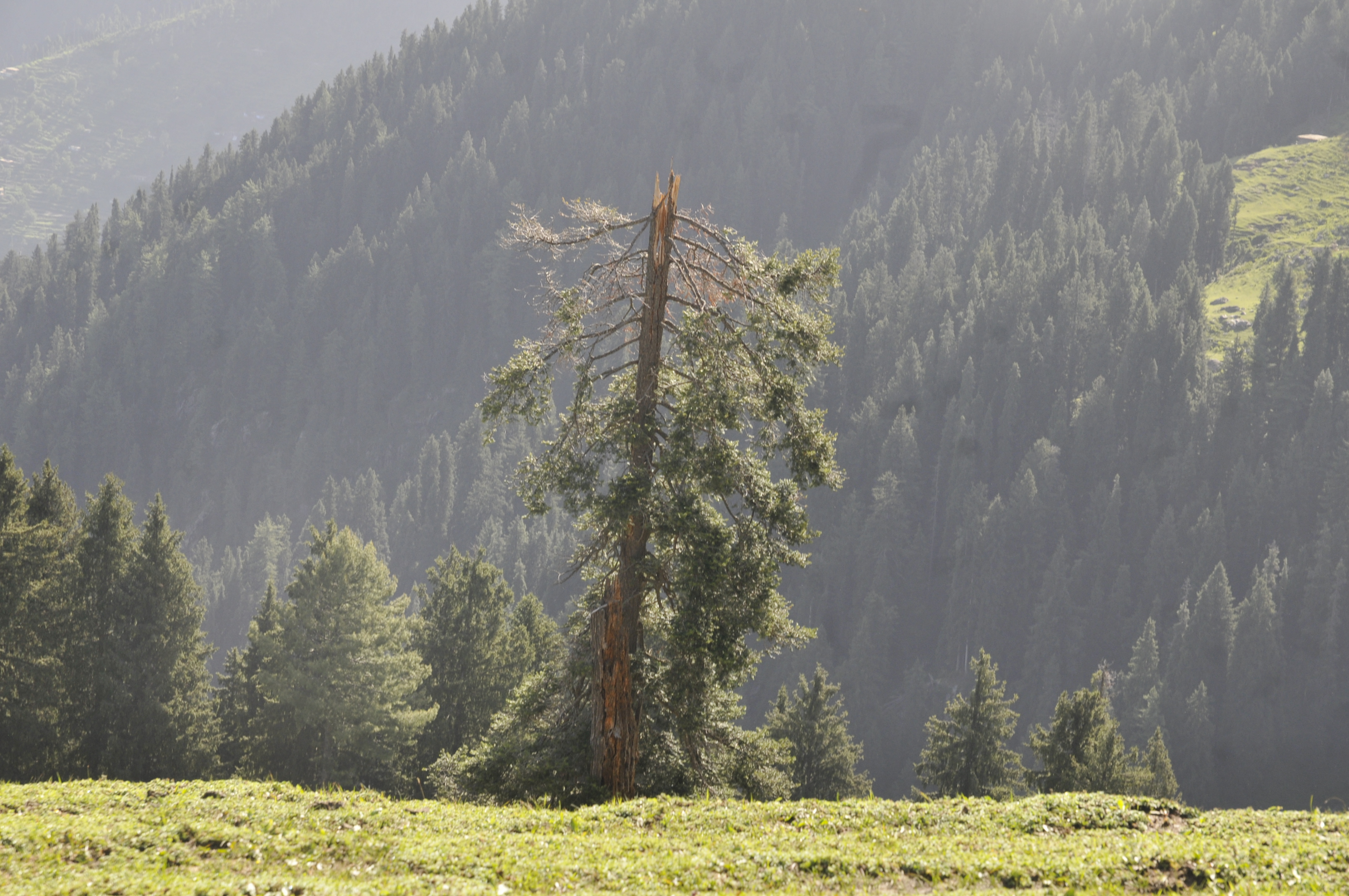
Elum Mountain

Elum Ghar, also known as Mount Elum, is a 2,800 metres (9,200 ft) high mountain located in the Swat and Buner districts of Khyber Pakhtunkhwa, Pakistan. Elum Ghar is the highest peak in the region, and is snow-covered most of the year. It is located west of Pir Baba's shrine in the Buner District. The mountain was a significant pilgrimage site for Hindus until 1947, and is believed to be the site where a previous incarnation of the Buddha gave up his life.

== History ==
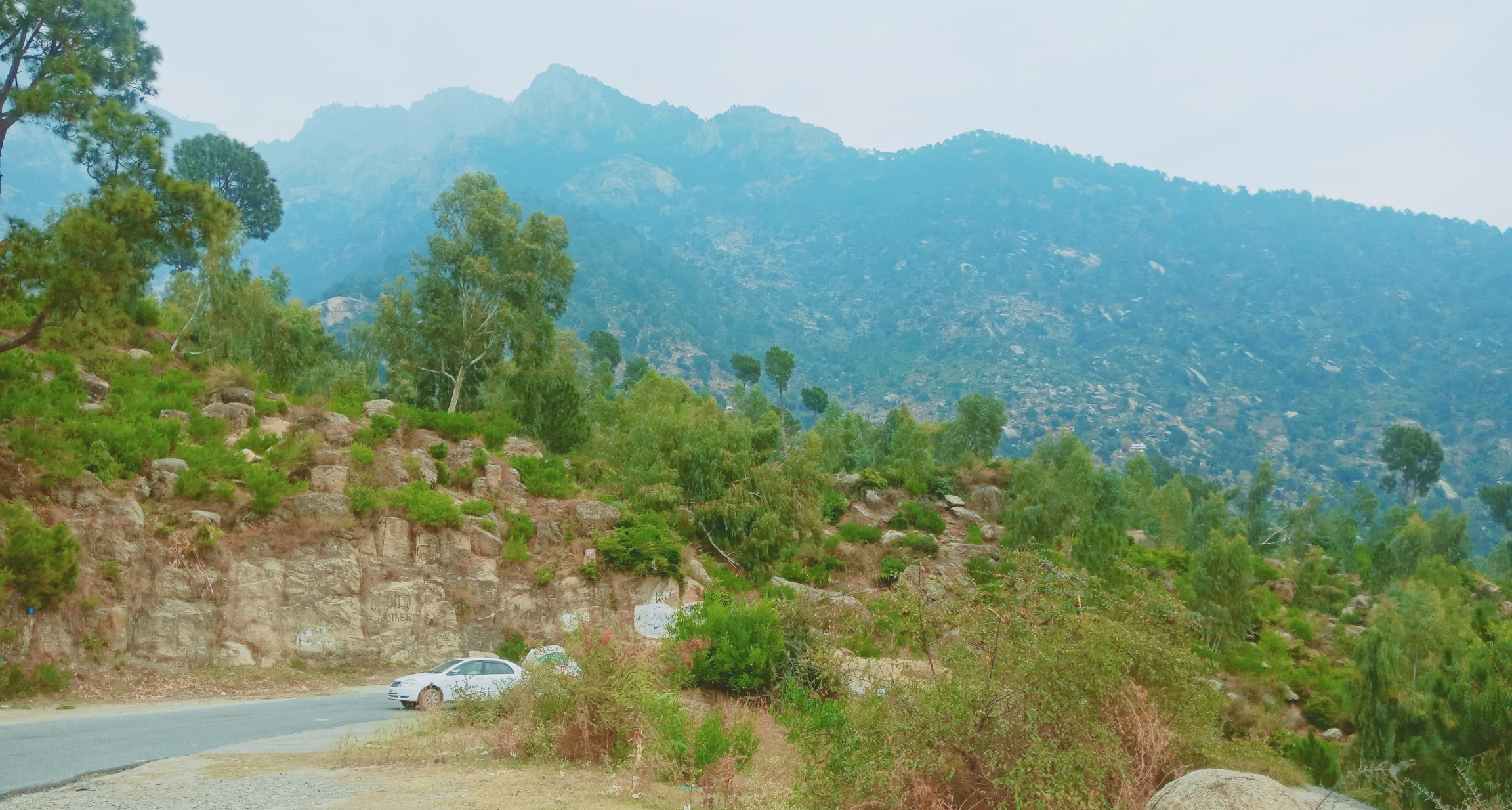
Elum Mountain Buner

Elum Ġhar's peak is called Jūgyānū Sar, where Rām taḫt was believed to be located. Hindus used to worship Rām taḫt as they believe Rām Čandar spent part of his banbās "forest-dwelling" there. This tradition is not mentioned in the Rāmāyaṇa of Vālmīki. Hindus used to celebrate Sawan Sangran every year at Rām taḫt. On the first night of Sawan they would hold vigil, worship, and recite their holy book. At dawn the paṇḍit would lead them up the mountain to Rām taḫt, where praśād would be distributed and circumambulation occurred. The site had shades for the Hindu pilgrims until they were removed by the Wāli of Swat, Miangul Abdul Wadud. The festival is no longer celebrated.
