= Birbal =

Mughal courtier, poet, and military commander of the sixteenth century

Raja Birbal
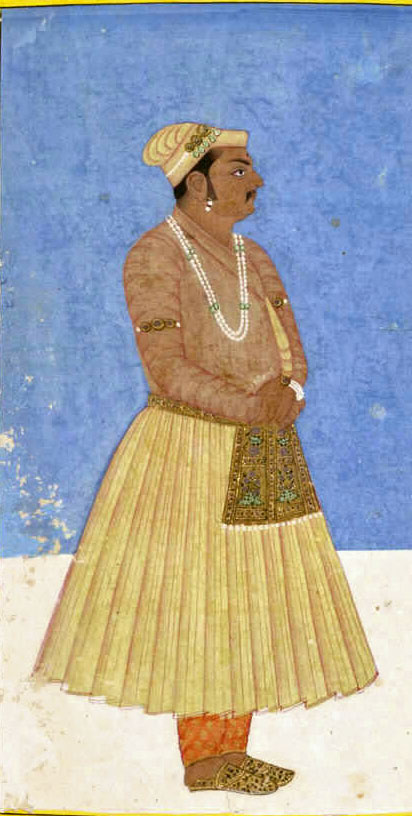
- Birbal

Courtier and Mansabdar of the Mughal Empire
- In office c. 1556–1562 – 16 February 1586
- Monarch: Akbar

Personal details
- Born: Mahesh Das; 1528 Near Kalpi, Mughal Empire (present-day Uttar Pradesh, India)
- Died: 16 February 1586 (aged 57–58) Swat Valley, Khyber Pakhtunkhwa, Mughal Empire (present-day Pakistan)

Military service
- Allegiance: Mughal Empire

Raja Birbal (born Mahesh Das; 1528 – 16 February 1586) was a senior advisor, poet, and military commander in the Mughal court under Emperor Akbar. Appointed to the Mughal court between 1556 and 1562, he rose to become one of Akbar's principal advisers and was granted the title Kavi Rai (poet laureate). He was also the only Hindu known to have adopted Din-i Ilahi, the syncretic religious movement founded by the emperor. Birbal was killed on 16 February 1586 when Yusufzai tribesmen ambushed his forces in the Malandari Pass during a Mughal campaign in the northwest.

== Early life and entry into Akbar's court ==
Mahesh Das was born in 1528 in the vicinity of Kalpi (in modern-day Uttar Pradesh) into a Brahman family with a background in poetry and literature. Trained in Hindi, Sanskrit, and Persian, he wrote poetry and music in Braj Bhasha, beginning his career at the court of Raja Ram Chandra of Rewa under the pen name Brahma Kavi.

Between 1556 and 1562, he joined Akbar's imperial service, where his literary skill and conversational wit won him favor. Akbar granted him the title of Raja and the name Birbal, which historians derive from Vir Var, a loyal courtier in the Sanskrit story collection Vetala Panchavimshati.

== Administrative and military career ==
Within the Mughal administration, Birbal served as a mansabdar with both civil and military duties, assisting Akbar with domestic governance and imperial correspondence. He participated in the 1572 expedition to Punjab against Mirza Muhammad Hakim and accompanied Akbar on military campaigns in Gujarat. He accompanied Akbar on military campaigns in Gujarat and participated in the 1572 expedition to Punjab against Mirza Muhammad Hakim.

In February 1586, Akbar dispatched Birbal with reinforcements to the northwestern frontier (modern -day Swat District, Khyber Pakhtunkhwa, Pakistan) to suppress a rebellion by the Yusufzai tribes. During an ambush at the Malandari Pass, he was killed alongside several thousand Mughal troops. Upon learning of Birbal's death, Akbar abstained from food and drink for two days, grieving that the body could not be recovered for Hindu funeral rites.

== Historical record and tradition ==
Contemporary chroniclers such as Abu'l-Fazl ibn Mubarak and Badayuni documented Birbal's standing as a court poet, his close personal standing with Akbar, and his adherence to the emperor's policy of Sulh-i-kul (universal peace). Although orthodox courtiers resented his influence, historians conclude that Birbal merely reinforced, rather than originated, Akbar's religiously inclusive policies.

After his death, Birbal’s historical career was largely overshadowed in Indian folklore by oral tales depicting him as a witty courtier who regularly outsmarted his peers and the emperor. A two-storey red sandstone palace at Fatehpur Sikri is popularly known as Birbal's House, though architectural historians attribute its construction to Akbar's queens and consider it unlikely that he resided there.

== Legacy and popular culture ==
By Akbar's death, oral tales of Birbal's wit and moral judgment were widespread in northern India, gradually merging with older Sanskrit, Persian, and Arabic wisdom tales. Within the folktale tradition, Birbal functions as a trickster figure whose wit and sharp reasoning expose the hypocrisy of corrupt officials and orthodox clerics.

The Akbar–Birbal folktales remain widely circulated in modern South Asia through children's literature, comic books such as Amar Chitra Katha, and television adaptations.
