= Dawlatzai =

Pashtun tribe

'Dawlatzai (Pashto: دولتزئ) is a Pashtun tribe in eastern and northern Afghanistan. Dawlatzai live in Ningarhar‚ Kabul‚Balkh‚ Paktia‚ Paktika‚ Laghman‚Kunar‚ Baghlan‚ Samangan‚ Kundoz‚ Khost and Kandahar. All Provinces have Dawlatzai Villages. Dawlatzai is close to the Sulaymankhel tribe. Azad Khan Afghan oder Azad Khan Sulimankhel also He is from this tribe.

Tahir Dawlatzai.

== Distribution ==
Dawlatzais live in the Logar, Samangan, Paktia, Paktika, Khost, Baghlan, Nangarhar, Balkh, Faryab, and Kabul provinces of Afghanistan.

Many Subtribes from the Orakzai, Kakar, Yusufzai across Afghanistan and Pakistan may also bear the same Daulatzai or Dawlatzai name, which shouldn't be confused with each other.
