= Pashto Academy =

Language Regulatory Institute in Pakistan

Pashto Academy (Pashto: پښتو اکېډمي) is a language regulatory institution based at the University of Peshawar in Peshawar, Khyber Pakhtunkhwa, Pakistan responsible for the standardisation, advancement, and promotion of the Pashto language in Pakistan. It was established in 1955 with the support of the Government of Khyber Pakhtunkhwa, with Maulana Abdul Qadir serving as its first director. It was created following the precedent the Pashto Tolana in Kabul having been set up in 1937. It is a research and publication institution with a focus on Pashto linguistic development and research. Areas studied and researched by the academy include Pashtun culture, literature, history, and the arts.

== Activities ==
Since its inception, the Pashto Academy has produced over 500 publications in Pashto, which include classical texts, modern literature, critical literature, scientific works, translations, Pashto lexicon, research publications, booklets, and journals. The academy maintains a library which is host to a large collection of printed Pashto books, rare texts and manuscripts, media, tapes, and photographs of prominent scholars and poets. The academy also maintains a museum and art gallery, inaugurated in 2009, depicting Pashtun cultural heritage. A research cell has been set up at the academy which conducts studies on the life and works of Khushal Khan Khattak, regarded as one of the most notable classical Pashtun poets.

== Directors ==
Past and present directors of the Pashto Academy:

- Maulana Abdul Qadir
- Mian Syed Rasool Rasa
- Syed Azeem Shah Khyal Bokhari
- Mohammad Nawaz Tahir
- Raj Wali Shah Khattak
- Salma Shaheen
- Dr. Nasrullah Jan Wazir (Current Director)

== See also ==
- Academy of Sciences of Afghanistan – Pashto language regulation board in Afghanistan
- National Language Authority (Urdu) – National regulation board for Urdu
- Sindhi Language Authority – Sindhi language regulation authority
- Balochi Academy – Balochi language regulation academy
