= Pir Baba =

Muslim Saint Sufi

Hazrat Syed Ali Tirmizi Pir Baba
- پیر بابا
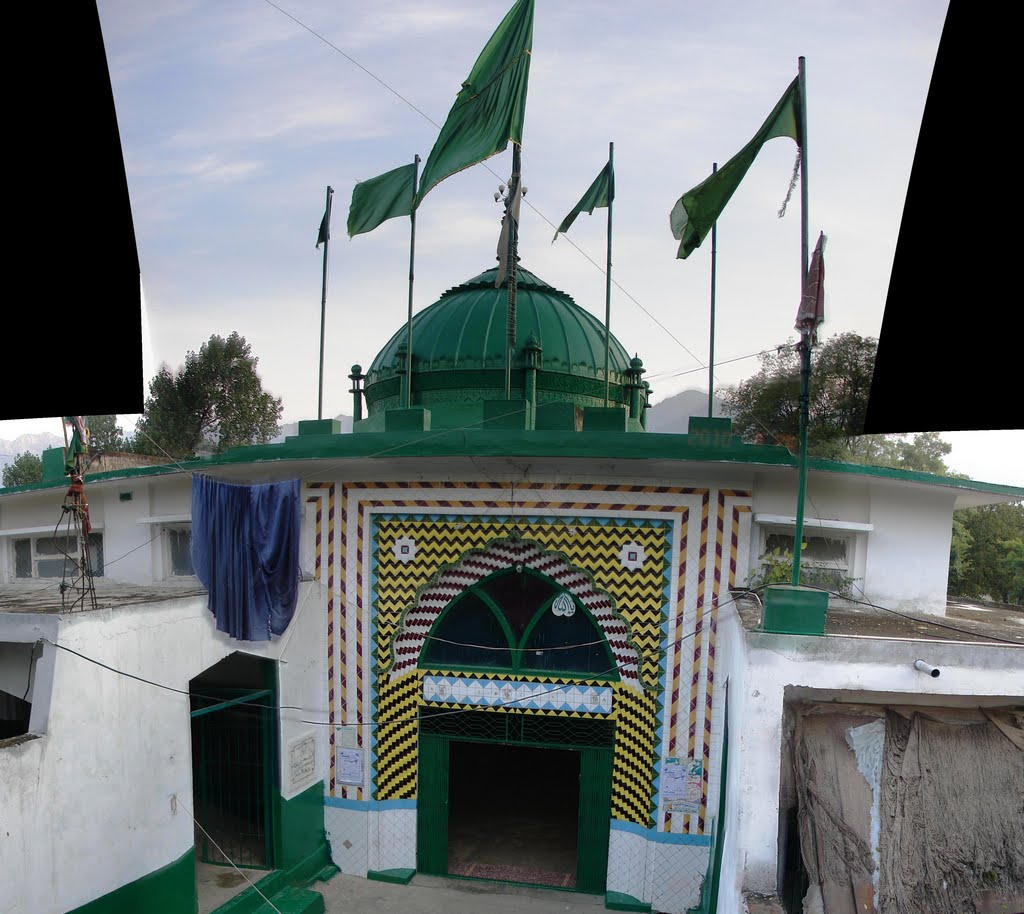
- Buner Sharif Mazar of Pir Baba
- Title: Syed Ali Tirmizi

Personal life
- Born: Syed Ali Tirmizi; Around 908 Hijri, 1502 A.D. Fergana, Uzbekistan
- Died: Around Rajab 991 Hijri, 1583 A.D. BunerSharif
- Resting place: Pacha Killay Buner Sharif, Pakistan
- Notable work: Spreading Islam
- Other name: Pir Baba
- Website: pirbaba.org

Religious life
- Religion: Islam
- Order: Chisti Order

Muslim leader
- Teacher: Syed Ahmad Noor, Sheikh Saalaar Roomi
- Period in office: 900-1000 Hijri
- Successor: Syed Mustafa & Akhund Darweza
- Disciple of: Salaar Roomi
- Students: Syed Mustafa, Akhoondzada; Dewana, Hisar and other

Syed Ali Tirmizi (Pashto: سيد علي ترمذي), more commonly known as Pir Baba (پير بابا), was a Sufi Pir who settled in Buner in present-day Khyber Pakhtunkhwa, Pakistan.

He was a Hussaini Syed, probably born in 908 AH (1502 CE), in Fergana (present-day Uzbekistan), of Sayyid descent. He died in AH 991 (1583 CE). He and his disciple Akhun Darweza Baba had major differences with Pir Roshan regarding his 'Roshnai Movement'. Hazrat Pir Baba was a stalwart of the Chishti, Kabrawi, Sarwardi, and Qadri Sufi order, which emphasised strict adherence to the Sharia of Islam.

He and his disciple Akhun Darweza baba saw Pir Roshan's teachings as a deviation from the path of Prophet Muhammad SWS and the consensus of scholars. Moreover, they were aligned with the existing social and tribal hierarchy. Hazrat Pir Baba and Akhun Darweza baba had theological differences with Pir Roshan's teachings. They saw his teachings a dangerous innovation in the religion (bid'ah). The Mughal fought him because he challenged their rule.

== Shrine (Mazar) ==
Baba's grave and shrine is in Pacha Killay village in the mountainous Buner District of present-day Khyber Pakhtunkhwa.

In 2009, the Sufi shrine of Pir Baba was closed down by Taliban temporarily.
