= List of Pashto-language poets =

This is a list of Pashto language poets.

== Folkloric ==
- Amir Kror Suri

== 16th century ==
- Pir Roshan (1525–1585), poet, warrior, and intellectual

== 17th and 18th century ==
Mira Jan sail Momand (1910--1990) born in koda khel Momand

- Khushal Khattak (1613–1689) born in Nowshaar Province, Peshawar, Afghanistan, he was a poet, warrior, and chief.
- Nazo Tokhi (1651–1717) born at Kandahar, she was a poet and mother of Mirwais Hotak.
- Rahman Baba (1653–1711) born at Lakkimarwat, poet.
- Abdul Hamid Baba (?–c.1732) born near Peshawer, he was a poet.
- Hussain Hotak (?–1738) born at Kandahar, poet, king.
- Afzal Khan Khattak (?–c.1770) poet, grandson of Khushal Khattak.
- Ahmad Shah Durrani (1723–1773) born at Kandahar he was a poet, king, founder of Afghanistan.
- Hafiz Alpuri (?–c. 1810), sufi poet from Shangla District.
- Rahat Zakheli (1884-1963) born at Nowshera, Pakistan. He is the first Pashto novelist and first short story writer, who was also a poet.
- Zarghona Anaa (died 1772) was the mother of Ahmad Shah Durrani.

== 20th century and beyond ==
=== A ===
- Khatir Afridi
- Abaseen Yousafzai
- Alif Jana Khattaka
- Abdul Hadi Mulla
- Asmatullah Zaheer

=== B ===
- Hanif Baktash

=== D ===
- Rahmatullah Dard
- Tahir Dawar
- Darwesh Durrani
- Barakwal Miakhel

=== F ===
- Farigh Bukhari

=== G ===
- Gilaman Wazir

I Imran dewana

=== J ===
- Abdul Bari Jahani

=== K ===
- Pir Mohammad Karwan
- Hafizullah Khaled
- Ghani Khan
- Ajmal Khattak
- Pareshan Khattak

=== L ===
- Sulaiman Layeq
- Arman Loni
- Wranga Loni

=== M ===
- Qalandar Momand
- Abdul Ali Mustaghni
- Matiullah Turab
- Misri Khan Gigyani

=== P ===
- Pir Gohar

=== R ===
- Riaz Tasneem
- Raz Muhammad Raz

=== S ===
- Rahmat Shah Sail
- Amanullah Sailaab Sapi
- Hamza Shinwari
- Kabir Stori
- Salma Shaheen
- Sahib Shah Sabir
- Saadullah Jan Barq

=== T ===
- Sherzaman Taizi

=== Z ===
- Mohammad Hashem Zamani
- Ezatullah Zawab
