= Pata Khazana =

Anthology of Pashto poetry

Pata Khazāna (Pashto: پټه خزانه, lit. 'Hidden Treasure') is the title of an old manuscript written by Mohammad Hotak in the Pashto language. According to its discoverer, the script contains an anthology of Pashto poetry, which precedes the earliest known works of Pashto literature by hundreds of years. Most experts consider it to be a forgery.

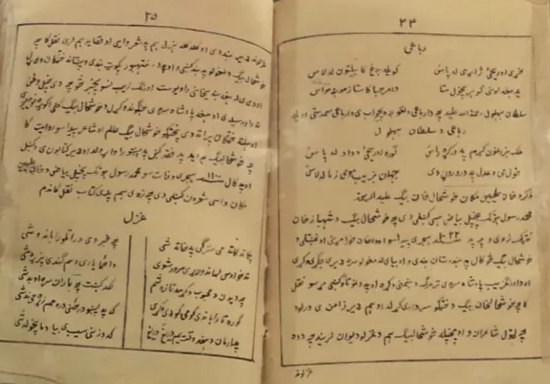
Folios from a manuscript of the Pata Khazana, scribed by Muhammad Abbas Kasi, Quetta, 1303 A.H. (1886 C.E.)

== Discovery ==
The Afghan scholar Abdul Hai Habibi claimed to have discovered the manuscript in 1944. He claimed it was a 19th-century copy of an anthology of Pashto poetry written in 1729 in Kandahar by Shah Hussain Hotak. The anthology is a compilation of works of hitherto unknown poets dating back to the eighth century. Habibi published the manuscript as a facsimile in 1975 but did not make the original document available for historical testing due to the scholars not following the UN protocol. The original book resides at Afghan archives in Kabul for viewing.

== Reception ==
Since the publication of the first edition of the book, some scholars have raised doubts about its authenticity. Habibi dismissed such critics, stating that their arguments were not "scientifically based". Nevertheless, most experts consider it to be a forgery.

The earliest known document written in Pashto is dated to the sixteenth century. The poems compiled in the Pata Khazana therefore extend the history of Pashto literature by about 800 years. The first translation into a European language, with a detailed critical commentary, only appeared in 1987, written by the Italian Iranologist Lucia Serena Loi. The most intensive critical occupation with the manuscript among Pashto scholars was published by the Pashtun scholar Qalandar Momand in 1988. Another scholar Juma Khan Sufi in his critical exposition of Pata Khazana also questions the authenticity of the Pata Khazana.

As the original manuscript is not available to the public, the authenticity of the document could only be checked by analyzing the orthography and style of the facsimile. Due to the large number of errors and anachronisms found in the script, the authenticity of the manuscript is widely excluded among scholars of Iranian studies. Some scholars, however, do not want to rule out completely the authenticity of at least parts of some poems compiled in the manuscript.

There is no consensus on the time of fabrication. Loi considers the manuscript a forgery of the late 19th century, while the Iranologist David Neil MacKenzie concludes from the anachronisms that the document was fabricated only shortly before its claimed discovery in 1944. MacKenzie's central argument refers to the use of the modern Pashto letters ẓ̌e (ـږ) and ṇun (ڼ) throughout the script. These letters were only introduced into the Pashto alphabet in 1936 when the Afghan government reformed the Pashto orthography. MacKenzie claims that the two letters have never been found simultaneously in any genuine manuscript before 1935.
