= Abdul Rahim Majzoob =

Pakistani Pashto poet, researcher and jurist (1935–2021)

- عبدالرحیم مجذوب
- Born: January 14, 1935; Sari Naurang, Lakki Marwat, North-West Frontier Province, British India
- Died: October 24, 2021 (aged 86); Abbottabad, Khyber Pakhtunkhwa, Pakistan
- Education: Islamia College Peshawar; University of Peshawar
- Occupations: Poet, writer, researcher and jurist
- Children: Fazal Rahim Marwat
- Writing career
- Notable works: Da Noor Mazharoona; Da Majzūb kuliyāt

Abdul Rahim Majzoob (Urdu: عبدالرحیم مجذوب; 14 January 1935 - 24 October 2021) was a Pakistani Pashto poet, writer, researcher and jurist from Lakki Marwat. He was alumnus of Islamia College Peshawar. His popular work included Zairr Guloona, Da Meenay Tanda, and his complete works titled Da Noor Mazharoona (2017).

== Early life and education ==
Majzoob was born on 14 January 1935 in Nar Sahibdad Madad Khel (Serai Naurang, Lakki Marwat). His father Abdul Karim was a big landlord and feudal of the area but he himself adopted austerity. He received his early religious education in a village mosque, learned the Qur'an and mastered other religious books. His father had appointed a mentor for him at home. From his school days, he took a keen interest in the poetry of Ghalib, Allama Iqbal, Khushal Khan Khattak and Rahman Baba. After matriculating from Serai Naurang High School in 1950, he did FA from Bannu and BA from Islamia College, Peshawar. In 1956 on the advice of his father, he obtained LLB degree from Law College, the University of Peshawar.

== Career ==
Majzoob was fluent in Persian and translated many Persian books into Pashto. He also practiced law in Bannu and Lakki Marwat because his father wanted to see him as a lawyer. He founded literary organizations. His famous writings and poetry collections are Da Noor Mazharoona, Kaliyat de Majzoob - based on eight collections of poetry.

Majzoob died on 24 October 2021, in a hospital in Abbottabad. His funeral prayers were offered at his hometown and he was buried in the local cemetery, Sari Naurang. He was the father of Fazal Rahim Marwat, former Vice-Chancellor of Bacha Khan University.

== See also ==
- Saadullah Jan Barq
