= Ahmad Salim =

Punjabi poet, writer, archivist and historian (1945–2023)

Ahmad Salim, Ahmed Saleem or Muhammad Salim Khawaja (26 January 1945 – 11 December 2023) was a Pakistani writer, archivist and co-founder of the South Asian Resource and Research Centre, a private archive established in 2001.

== Early life ==
Muhammad Salim Khawaja was born on 26 January 1945 in the village of Miana Gondal in Gujrat District of Punjab. He was the fourth among seven brothers and sisters.

Salim's early education was in Miana Gondal, before going to Peshawar for matriculation. While studying in Peshawar, Salim made acquaintance with writers and poets; notably Farigh Bukhari, Mohsin Ahsan, Raza Hamdani, and Jauhar Meer.

After matriculating from Peshawar, Salim moved to Karachi for his intermediate education. He got admission to Urdu College. Around that time Salim participated in a competition arranged by Afkar, a literary magazine. Participants were asked to write their thoughts on Faiz Ahmad Faiz's poetry. Ahmad Salim's poem on Faiz got first prize in the competition. At that time Faiz was the principal of Abdullah Haroon College. On Faiz's invitation, Ahmad Salim joined Abdullah Haroon College. A close association grew between Faiz and Ahmad Salim and continued till Faiz's death in 1984.

== Career ==
Muhammad Saleem Khawaja adopted his pen name as Ahmed Saleem or Ahmad Salim. After completing high school (Intermediate) Ahmad Salim joined the National Bank of Pakistan in 1968. Later he was transferred to Rawalpindi where he continued working for that bank through 1969. Ahmad Salim then moved to Lahore and started teaching at Shah Hussain College. During 1969–1971 he was associated with National Awami Party (NAP), and was briefly put in jail in 1971 for his criticism of the Pakistan Army's operation in East Pakistan (now Bangladesh).

In 1972, Zulfiqar Ali Bhutto appointed Faiz as the Chairman of the Pakistan National Council of the Arts in Islamabad, Pakistan. On Faiz's invitation, Ahmad Salim joined the council. During his association with the National Council of Arts from 1972 through 1975, Ahmad Salim operated the Folklore Research Centre and published material on Punjabi and Sindhi folklore. Ahmad Salim left the Council shortly after Faiz left that institution in 1974.

From 1976 to 1977, Ahmad Salim taught at Sindh University, Jamshoro. He taught a course on Pakistani languages—the course material was developed by him. At that time Shaikh Ayaz was the Vice-Chancellor of Sindh University. Ahmad Salim enjoyed good relations with Shaikh Ayaz, as he had translated Ayaz's poetry into Punjabi. Ahmad Salim's principal work at the Sindh University was to translate Shah Hussain's poetry into Sindhi, and Bhitai's work into Punjabi, though he could not complete the latter. During his stay at the Sindh University, Ahmad Salim also completed his Bachelor of Arts degree.

After Bhutto imposed martial law, Ahmad Salim moved to Karachi in late 1977. There he wrote reviews of TV programs for Daily Aman (Editor: Afzal Siddiqui). For supplemental income, Ahmad Salim did a lot of translation work too, and came to popularly known as Ahmad Salim Muttarajjim (translator). In 1979, he got admission in MA Philosophy at Karachi University. He completed his MA with a gold medal. It was around that time that Ahmad Salim got married. Starting from 1981 he edited JafaKash, a labour magazine. In 1985–1988, Ahmad Salim taught a course on Pakistani languages at Karachi University — the same course that he had taught at the University of Sindh. After separating from his wife in 1988, Ahmad Salim moved to Lahore. He had one daughter from that marriage.

When Pakistan's National and Provincial assemblies were dissolved by President Ghulam Ishaq Khan in 1990, the Jang Group of Newspapers asked Ahmad Salim to write a book on Pakistan's history related to the dissolution of assemblies. Ahmad Salim quickly learned about the scarcity of research material and the difficulty in obtaining information from government institutes. He started collecting and archiving material of historical importance. Thus became his career in archiving.

From 1996 to June 2007, Ahmad Salim worked as the Director of Urdu Publications for Sustainable Development Policy Institute (SDPI), an NGO. After leaving that position, he still did part-time research work for that organization.

== Awards and recognition ==
- Pride of Performance award by the President of Pakistan in recognition of his contribution in the field of literature in 2011.

== South Asian Research and Resource Centre ==
In 2001, Salim and his Christian friends, Leonard D'souza and Nosheen D'souza, formed the South Asian Research and Resource Center (SARRC). SARRC is a private, non-profit archive, focusing on development and peace with special emphasis on the rights of religious minorities and indigenous people. It has pioneered resource and documentation services in the Pakistani non-profit sector.

Research Studies Conducted since 2003 include:

- Bonded Labour in Pakistan's Mines Sector – 2002, for the International Labour Organisation. Islamabad/Geneva
- Messing Up the Past: Text Books of Pakistan 1947–2000, conducted for Ford Foundation, 2003
- Studies on Curricula and textbooks reforms – Development Department, Embassy of Netherlands, 2002–2003 (with co-authorship Dr. A.H Nayyar)
- Critical Issues in Education Policy – A Citizens' Review of the National Education Policy 1998–2010, Commonwealth Education/Save the Children – UK, Islamabad, 2006 (with co-authorship Dr. A.H. Nayyar)
- Violence against Women for Ministry of Women Development, Govt. of Pakistan, 2004
- Violence, memories and Peace building for Christian Socialists in Sweden/SIDA/Olof Palme International Centre, Sweden, 2005
- Tolerance, a pilot project, University of Uppsala, Sweden, 2006
- Equal Citizens? Friedrich Neumann Foundation, FNS, Islamabad 2006
- Role of Minorities in Nation Building with Focus on Karachi, Church World Service Pakistan/Afghanistan, Karachi 2006
- Pluralism and Diversity in Asia : Protecting and Promoting the rights of religious minorities through education and training, minority rights Group International, UK 2007
- Common spiritual Heritage for Peace and Harmony, Heinrich Boll foundation, Pakistan/Afghanistan, (German Organization), Lahore 2008
- Religious Fundamentalism and its Impact on non-Muslim, Christian Study Centre, funded by Church of Sweden, 2008
- The Issues of Joint and Separate Electorates Systems, Christian Study Centre, funded by Church of Sweden, 2008
- Sufism and Peace, Church world Service, Pakistan / Afghanistan, Karachi 2008
- State Accountability and Education rights of Minorities in Pakistan (A pre-roundtable background paper), 2008, IDRC, Canada
- Textbooks for Religious Studies (Ethics) Grade III to Grade XII for National Book Foundation, Ministry of Education, Government of *Pakistan are being prepared for 2009–2010, education sessions.
- Textbooks on parliamentary Democracy (Grade V, VIII and X) for SDPD (United Nations Development Programme)
- Development of 10 textbook modules for non-Muslims students in Pakistani schools. These proposed texts have been developed as alternative educational materials with the support of Minority Rights Group, UK

SARRC contains a wealth of information on minorities, development, gender, security and violence which have been focal to the evolution of history and society of the region. The SARRC has acquired and preserved information including fact-sheets, unpublished material, manuscripts, policy papers and official reports of various Commissions and Committees. Almost all of the important newspapers, periodicals, books, reports and documents published during the last two centuries are preserved under one roof.

== Death ==
Salim died on 11 December 2023, at the age of 78. He was buried in Lahore, Pakistan at the Miani Sahib Graveyard with a large number of friends and admirers attending the funeral. He was reportedly suffering from a chronic liver disease and had to go through a liver implant. Later years of his life were spent in Islamabad.

== Bibliography ==
Salim published some 175 books in both Urdu and Punjabi, including essays, translations, biographies and poetry.

- Aḥmad Salīm; Amrita Pritam (2003). Lahore, 1947. Sang-e- Meel Publications. ISBN 978-969-35-1421-6.
- Aḥmad Salīm (2001). Ten days that dismembered Pakistan: March 15 – March 25, 1971, the real story of Yahya-Mujib-Bhutto talks. Dost Publications. ISBN 978-969-496-141-5.
- Aḥmad Salīm (1991). Pashtun and Baloch history: Punjabi view. Fiction House.
- Aḥmad Salīm (1997). Blood beaten track: Sheikh Mujib's nine months in Pakistan prison. Book Traders.
