= Raj Wali Shah Khattak =

Pashto poet and academic

Dr. Raj Wali Shah Khattak
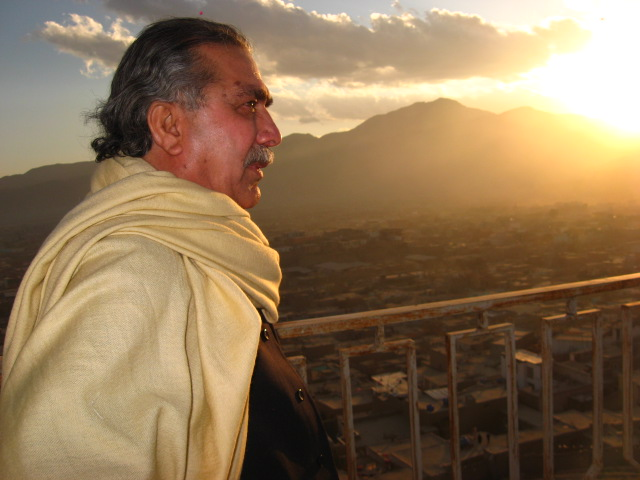
- Raj Wali Shah Khattak
- Born: 24 January 1952; Dak Ismail Khel, Nowshera District, Khyber Pakhtunkhwa, Pakistan
- Died: 20 July 2015 (aged 63); Malakand Top, KP, Pakistan
- Burial place: Village, Dak Ismail Khel, Nowshera
- Education: PhD in Pashto
- Occupations: poet, critic, researcher, professor, and academic

Raj Wali Shah Khattak (ډاکټر راج ولي شاه خټک), also known as Rajwali Shah, was a Pashto poet, critic, researcher, professor, and academic, best known for his leadership of the Pashto Academy at the University of Peshawar and for modernizing Pashto literary studies. Born in Dak Ismail Khel village of Nowshera District, Khyber Pakhtunkhwa, he earned his M.A. in Pashto from the University of Peshawar graduating top of his class and receiving a gold medal and completed his Ph.D. on Da Pukhto Adabi Tehreekoona

In 1978, Khattak joined the Pashto Academy at Peshawar University as a Research Specialist and rose to become its Director from 1995 to 2004, during which he established a language laboratory and launched the Academy’s first website, while overseeing over 500 publications in Pashto. He later served as Chairman of the Department of Pashto and as Dean of the Faculty of Islamic Studies and Oriental Languages until his retirement in January 2012.

Khattak published seventeen books, including his seminal study Da Pukhto Adabi Tehreekoona, and authored more than 100 research articles as well as over 100 critical reviews on Pashto literature and folklore. His poetic collection Sangzar garnered acclaim for its blend of social themes and traditional Pashto forms. In August 2006, the President of Pakistan conferred upon him the Tamgha-i-Imtiaz for his outstanding contributions to Pashto language and literature. A Fulbright Visiting Research Scholar at the University of Pennsylvania in 2007-08, he delivered lectures at venues including State University of New York, University, University of West Alabama and the Bacha Khan Peace Conference in New York.

Khattak died unexpectedly of a heart attack on 20 July 2015 while returning from Swat and was buried in his native village of Dak Ismail Khel. His passing prompted widespread mourning across literary and academic circles as an irreparable loss to Pashto literature.

== Early life ==
=== Family background ===
Khattak was born on 24 January 1952 in Dak Ismail Khel, a village in the Nowshera District of Khyber Pakhtunkhwa, Pakistan. He belonged to the Khairoo Khail (Abbas Khel) clan. Khattak grew up in a family noted for its deep-rooted cultural and religious values, with his father, Qadeem Shah, recognized for his devout nature. His early life in the region instilled in him a strong attachment to Pashtun traditions and a profound respect for his heritage, laying the foundation for his later contributions to Pashto language and literature.

=== Childhood ===
From an early age, Khattak demonstrated empathy and a sense of responsibility. At the age of seven, he notably returned winnings from a local game to a classmate, reflecting his compassionate nature. When his younger brother died during childhood, the ten-year-old Khattak undertook an eight-kilometre walk to inform family members, an event that deeply affected him.

Khattak’s early education was marked by frequent relocations due to his father’s work, including periods spent in Rohri and Hassan Abdal. These moves disrupted his formal schooling, but he persisted in continuing his studies. In 1971, amidst the turbulence of the Indo-Pakistani War and the Bangladesh Liberation conflict, he travelled to Bangladesh for work and subsequently returned to Pakistan, resumed his education despite the challenges posed by his family's frequent moves. His determination and resilience were evident throughout his academic journey, ultimately shaping the scholar he became.

=== Education ===
Despite upheaval, Khattak excelled academically. He consistently topped his class, earning scholarships in matriculation and intermediate examinations. His handwriting was famed for its clarity and ambidexterity, writing fluently with both hands. Around age fourteen, he began composing Pashto poetry, foreshadowing his future literary career.

=== Influences and mentorship ===
During his youth, Khattak engaged with leading Pashto literary figures. He met Khan Abdul Ghani Khan and Amir Hamza Khan Shinwari and Qalandar Momand, whose mentorship and the rich Pashtun oral traditions of his home region deeply shaped his nascent interest in Pashto language and literature.

== Academic and career ==
=== Early teaching roles ===
Following his master’s degree in Pashto (gold medallist, University of Peshawar), Khattak began his teaching career (1976-1978), instructing Pashto and Islamic Studies at local colleges and primary schools. He was then appointed as a lecturer at Edwardes College, and he also taught Pashto to foreign diplomats and ICRC staff in Peshawar.

=== Pashto Academy, University of Peshawar ===
- Research Specialist (1978–1995): Joined the Pashto Academy to support research projects and publications.
- Director Pashto Academy (July 1995-July 2004): Modernized the Academy by establishing a language laboratory and launching its first website. Oversaw the publication of journals and edited monthly and quarterly Pashto periodicals.

=== University teaching and administration ===
- Lecturer and later Professor in the Department of Pashto, UoP, teaching M.A., M.Phil., and Ph.D. courses.
- Chairman, Department of Pashto, UoP.
- Warden of Rahman Baba Hostel (1985-1990) and TSC Hostel (1992-1995).
- Dean, Faculty of Islamic Studies and Oriental Languages, UoP (21 July 2010 - 23 January 2012).

=== International engagement ===
- Khattak was the first Pashto scholar to receive a post-doctoral Fulbright Research Scholarship (2007-2008) at the University of Pennsylvania, where he also delivered lectures. During his fellowship, he presented at the State University of New York, the University of West Alabama, and the Bacha Khan Peace Conference in New York. He also contributed to Voice of America broadcasts and spoke at several academic and cultural platforms in the United States.

==== International Seminars and Conferences ====
Presented research on Pashto literature and culture across the United States, United Kingdom, UAE, Afghanistan, and Pakistan, including UNESCO conferences and academic workshops on Sufism, Pashtun values, and linguistic diversity.

==== Research, Publications, and Editorial Work ====
- Doctorate (1985): Completed Ph.D. on Da Pukhto Adabi Tehreekoona (“Literary Movements in Pashto”).
- Books and Articles: Authored seventeen books—including monographs, literary studies, criticism, culture poetry collections, and 100+ research articles and critical reviews on Pashto literature and folklore.
- Editorial Roles:
1. Editor-in-Chief, Monthly Pashto journal (1995-2004).
2. Editor, Quarterly Tatara Peshawar, and various scholarly compilations.

==== Awards and Distinctions ====
- Gold Medals: M.A. Pashto (University of Peshawar) and International Literary Convention.
- Tamgha-i-Imtiaz (2006): Conferred by President Pervez Musharraf for meritorious contributions to Pashto language and literature.
- International Youth Year Talent Scholarship (1985): Recognized for literary achievements.

==== Post-Retirement Contributions ====
Following his retirement in January 2012, Raj Wali Shah Khattak maintained a vibrant presence in the promotion of Pashto language and literature. He contributed to seminars across Pakistan and abroad, shared his expertise on Pashto-language radio programs such as Deewa Radio and Voice of America, and appeared as a resource person on national television channels including PTV and AVT Khyber—and international networks like BBC London, Star World, Afghan TV, and others. Through this sustained media engagement, he continued to advocate for Pashto culture and scholarship well into his later years.

== Books ==
Khattak published a total of 14 books. He is widely known for the following books:

- Da Pukhto Adabi Tehreekoona (Literary Movements in Pashto)
- Zeest Rozgar Da Faqir Jamil Beg (The Life Style of Faqir Jamil Beg)
- Manaqib-e-Faqir (Faqir Eulogies)
- Pashto Zhaba (The Pashto Language Dictionary)
- Da Pukhto Nawi Imla (The New Pashto Script)
- Sangzar (Poetry)
- Da Rehman Pa Shair (On the poetry of Rehman)
- Intangible Heritage of the Walled City of Peshawar [English] (UNESCO Pakistan)
- An Intangible Heritage [English] Published By InterLit Foundation
- Toori Chi Rana Kawai (Letters that shine)
- Rohi Mataloona [English] Published by InterLit Foundation Peshawar
- Pashtuno ke Kasb-o-Hunar[Urdu], Loc Virsa Islamabad
- Pashtunwali [Urdu], Loc Virsa Islamabad
- An introduction to Pashtun Culture {English}
- Rohology, the study of Pashto, Pashtuns and Pashtunwali {Pashto}
- Pashtun Lisan ul ghaib
- Ghani Khan da rang o noor shair
- Da Fikr Malghalary (published after his death by his son, Rishteen Wali)

== Tributes ==
Khattak's death on 20 July 2015 prompted widespread tributes across literary and academic circles in Pakistan and among Pashto-speaking communities abroad. His legacy has been honoured through commemorative gatherings, literary forums, and dedicated scholarships and societies celebrating his contributions to Pashto language, literature, and culture.

=== Swat Adabi Sanga Literary Function (July 2016) ===
In Mingora, the Swat Adabi Sanga hosted a tribute session at Rahim Shah Lala’s hujra, attended by poets, writers, and scholars.

- Sadullah Jan Barq, the chief guest, remarked that Khattak “died at least ten years before his time, as the Pashtun nation needed him” and lamented that had he lived longer, he would have produced “revolutionary works”.
- Prof. Zaid Gul Khattak lauded Raj Wali Shah as the “last link” in Pashto literature’s golden chain, highlighting his multifaceted excellence as poet, critic, analyst, and scholar.
- Numerous poets composed and recited verses in his honour, emphasizing the depth and range of his literary impact.

=== Dak Ismail Khel “Wali Forum” Inauguration (January 2017) ===
A literary gathering in Khattak’s native village of Dak Ismail Khel saw participants pay “rich tributes” to the late Pashto scholar during a session presided over by Prof. Zaid Gul of the RUH Forum in Islamabad.

- Prof. Gul announced the establishment of a “Wali Forum” branch in Khyber Pakhtunkhwa, dedicated to promoting Khattak’s teachings on mysticism (Tassawwuf) and fostering literary and cultural activities across the province.
- Speakers underscored Khattak’s reputation as a hidden Sufi whose scholarship and humility inspired both academic and lay audiences.

=== Dr Raj Wali Shah Khattak Adabi Karwan (DRSKAK) and Its Establishment ===
The Dr Raj Wali Shah Khattak Adabi Karwan (DRSKAK) was established in 2017 as a tribute to the renowned Pashto poet and scholar in his native village, Dak Ismail Khel. The organization was formed by local writers and literary enthusiasts to honour Dr. Khattak’s legacy and to initiate regular literary activities in his name. DRSKAK continues to organize literary sessions, encouraging young poets and writers to engage with the themes of peace, culture, and art that Dr. Khattak championed.

=== Fourth Death Anniversary Commemoration (July 2019) ===
Organized by the Raj Wali Shah Khattak Adabi Karwan (DRSKAK) in Dak Ismail Khel, this event brought together prominent Pashto literati to remember Khattak’s poetry and literary works.

- Dr. Haroon ur Rashid and Prof. Abaseen Yousafzai highlighted his unique style, noting how Khattak blended progressivism with mystical thought.
- Rehmat Shah Sail praised Khattak’s rigorous, scientific approach to research and described him as “a humble human being” whose art reflected deep scholarship.
- Rishteen Wali Khattak (his son) recounted his father’s vision of portraying the Pashtun people as lovers of peace, culture, and art, an ethos evident throughout his writings.

=== Wali Forum ===
To honour Khattak’s impact on Pashto scholarship and mysticism, the Wali Forum was established as an offshoot of the RUH Forum during a significant literary gathering in his native village, Dak Ismail Khel. The forum is dedicated to preserving and promoting Khattak’s teachings on mysticism (Tassawwuf), as well as fostering literary and cultural activities throughout Khyber Pakhtunkhwa. The initiative reflects the broad influence of his thought and the enduring value of his work in Pashto literature and Sufi philosophy.

=== DRSKAK ===
Founded in 2017, the Dr. Raj Wali Shah Khattak Adabi Karawan (DRSKAK) organizes regular literary events and monthly sessions in Dak Ismail Khel. DRSKAK actively encourages young poets, writers, and scholars to engage with Dr. Khattak’s vision, which emphasizes themes of peace, cultural pride, and artistic excellence. Through its programming, the Karawan sustains the dialogue around his ideas and keeps his contributions vibrant in contemporary Pashto literary circles.

=== Continued Scholarship and Research ===
Khattak’s research and poetry continue to be influential and are the subject of ongoing analysis by contemporary academics. His innovative theories, literary criticism, and poetry collections serve as core materials for research, with several literary essays and critical reviews devoted to his work. Notably, his legacy forms the basis for advanced academic inquiry such as doctoral research demonstrating the lasting relevance of his contributions to Pashto literature. There is documented evidence of a Ph.D. being completed on Khattak’s life, thought, and writings, underscoring his stature as a subject of serious and sustained scholarly interest.
