= Pashto literature and poetry =

Literature in the Pashto language

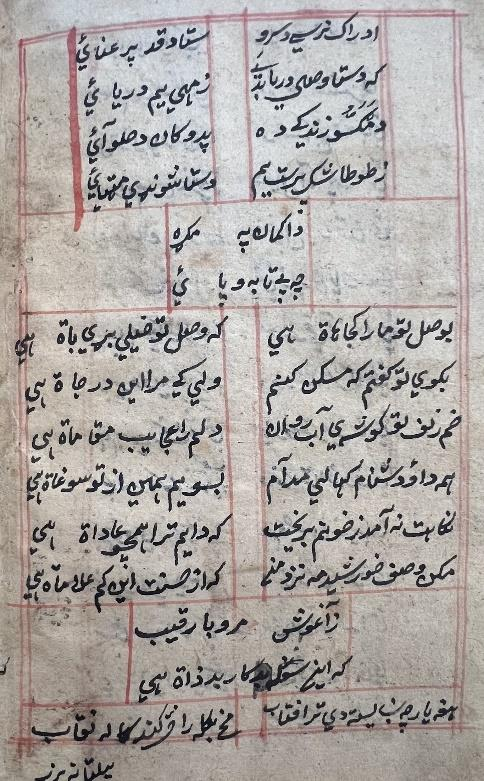
Folio of a Diwan-i-Rahman manuscript (Pashto MS 14), Peshawar, 27 February 1850

Pashto literature (Pashto: پښتو ليكنې) refers to literature and poetry in Pashto.

== History ==
The history of Pashto literature spreads over five thousands years having its roots in the oral tradition of Tappa (Pashto: ټپه/لنډۍ). However, the first recorded period begins in 8th century with Amir Kror Suri (a warrior poet). Later, Pir Roshan (1526–1574), who founded his own Sufi school of thoughts and began to preach his beliefs. He gave Pashto prose and poetry a new and powerful tone with a rich literary legacy. Khair-ul-Bayan, oft-quoted and bitterly criticized thesis, is most probably the first book on Sufism in Pashto literature. Among his disciples are some of the most distinguished poets, writers, scholars and Sufis, like Arzani, Mukhlis, Mirza Khan Ansari, Daulat and Wasil, whose poetic works are well preserved. Akhund Darweza (1533–1615), a popular religious leader and scholar gave a powerful counterblast to Bayazid's movement in the shape of Makhzanul Islam. He and his disciples have enriched the Pashto language and literature by writing several books of prose.

== Number of writers ==
Among the bibliographies and biographical dictionaries of Pashtun writers, an important work is Hamish Khalil's Da Qalam Khawandaan (A Directory of Pakhtoon Men of Letters) containing the profiles of over 3,000 Pashto-language writers in both prose and poetry who lived between 1800 and 1975.

== Literary magazines ==
As of 2009 there were more than 100 literary magazines in Pashto published in both Afghanistan and Pakistan.

== Proverbs ==
Here is a list of Pashto Proverbs (Pashto: د پښتو متلونه):

Proverb	In Roman Pashto	Meaning in English	Notes
متل matál	په رومي پښتو کښې pə romí pәx̌to ke	انګرېزۍ کښې مانا angrezә́i ke mānā́	Notes
مور په يولاس زانګو او په بل لاس نړۍ زانګوي	mor pə yaw lās zāngó aw pə bəl lās naṛә́i zāngawí	A mother rocks the cradle with one hand and the world with the other	
کار په کولو کیږي	Kār pə kəwəlo kiʒi	Work is done by doing it	
هر څه چې ډېر شي نو ګنډېر شي	har tsә če ḍér ši no ganḍér ši	When anything becomes allot it becomes poisonous	ګنډېر [ganḍér]= a bitter poisonous plant
غوا که توره ده, شيدې يې سپينې دي	ğwā kә tóra da šidé ye spíne di	Although a cow be black, her milk is white	
واده اسان وي خو ټک ټوک يې ګران وي	wādә́ asā́n wi xo ṭak-ṭúk ye grān wi	A wedding is easy but its workings are hard	ټک ټوک [ṭak-ṭúk] = the sound when two small things bang against each other; to denote working on small tasks
د وچو سره لامده هم سوځي	də wә́čo sәrá lāmdә́ ham swadzí	The wet too burn with the dry	
ژرنده که د پلار ده هم په وار ده	žránda kә dә plār da ham pә wār da	Even if the mill is of father, it is by turn	
تورې ته ګېنډې نيسه خبرو ته تندی نيسه	túre tə genḍé nisá, xabә́ro tə tandáy nisá	Hold the shield to the sword, the forehead to words	ګېنډه [genḍá] = rhino; as its skin is hard so shields would be made from it
پاړو د مار له لاسه مري	pāṛú dә mār lə lā́sa mrí	The snake charmer dies because of the snake	
په ګوهار کښې به يې سخی نه وي وايي به زموږ د کلي ګوهار هغه دی	pə gohā́r ke bə ye sxay nə wi. wā́yi bә zamuǵ də kalí gohā́r háğa day	In the herd he will not have calf. But will keep on saying: that is the herd of our village	ګوهار [gohā́r] =herd of cattle
پيشو زبرګه شوه منږک نه نيسي	pišó zbә́rga šwa manǵák nә nisí	The cat has become holy/saintly, she does not catch mice.	زبرګ [zbәrg] = saint
چېرته خوله چېرته څنګل	čérta xwla čérta tsangә́l	Where (be) the mouth (and) where (be) the elbow ?	To point out contrast: as most people cannot touch the elbow with the mouth
چې اوګره سړېږي مېلمه ډېرېږي	če ográ saṛéǵi melmә́ ḍeréǵi	When the rice porridge cools the guests increase	اوګره [ográ] = a Pashtun dish made by boiling rice

== Notable figures ==
- Amir Kror Suri, son of Amir Polad Suri, he was an 8th-century folk hero and king from the Ghor region of Afghanistan.
- Pir Roshan, Pashto poet known for assembling Pashtun armies to fight against the Mughal emperor Akbar; founded the 16th-century Roshanniya movement and wrote the Pashto book Khayr al-Bayān to present his philosophical ideas.
- Shaikh Mali, narrated the Yusufzai conquest of Swat, and devised rules for distribution of land and water rights which became known as da Shekh Mālī daftar.
- Khushal Khan Khattak, 17th-century warrior-poet who preached the unity of all Pashtuns.
- Rahman Baba (c. 1632 - c. 1706), one of the greatest Pashto poets of all time, whose works are as important to the Pashtun as William Shakespeare is to the English; his works are spiritual.
- Khan Abdul Ghani Khan, (c. 1914–1996), Pashtun philosopher and Pashto language poet, artist (painter and sculptor), writer and Pashtun nationalist politician of the 20th century. He was a son of Khan Abdul Ghaffar Khan and older brother of Khan Abdul Wali Khan.
- Afzal Khan Khattak
- Ashraf Khan Khattak
- Ajmal Khattak
- Pareshan Khattak
- Khan Roshan Khan
- Nazoo Anaa
- Ghani Khan
- Hamza Baba
- Kabir Stori
- Raj Wali Shah Khattak
- Karwan
- Ahmad Shah Baba
- Shah Shuja
- Timur Shah
- Abaseen Yousafzai
- Hamza Shinwari
- Riaz Tasneem
- Sahib Shah Sabir

== See also ==
- Pashtun culture
- List of Pashto-language poets
