= Fazal Rahim Marwat =

Pakistani historian

- Born: Fazal-ur-Rahim Khan Marwat; June 12, 1957 (age 69)
- Occupations: Researcher; Historian
- Children: Asfandyar Rahim
- Parent: Abdul Rahim Majzoob (father)

Academic background
- Education: University of Peshawar; Gomal University

1st Vice-Chancellor of Bacha Khan University
- In office 2012–2017
- Preceded by: None (office created)
- Succeeded by: Dr. Saqlain Naqvi

Fazal Rahim Marwat (Urdu: فضل رحیم مروت; born 12 June 1959), is a Pakistanieducator, writer, researcher, historian and former vice-chancellor of Bacha Khan University.

== Education ==
Fazal Rahim Marwat got his Ph.D. in 1992, M. Phil in 1982 and Political Science in 1979 from the University of Peshawar and B.A in 1976 from Gomal University Dera Ismail Khan.

== Literary work ==
- Marwat, Fazal-ur-Rahim Khan (2005). Talibanization of Pakistan: a case study of TNSM. Pakistan Study Centre, University of Peshawar. ISBN 978-9-6989-2801-8.
- Marwat, Fazal-ur-Rahim Khan (2005). From Muhajir to Mujahid, Politics of War Through Aid: (a Case Study of Afghan Refugees in NWFP). Pakistan Study Centre, University of Peshawar. ISBN 978-9-6989-2803-2.
- Toru, Parvez Khan; Marwat, Fazal-ur-Rahim Khan (2005). Celebrities of NWFP. Pakistan Study Centre, University of Peshawar. ISBN 978-9-6989-2802-5.
- Toru, Parvez Khan (2005). Destiny's Child. Pakistan Study Centre, University of Peshawar. ISBN 978-9-6989-2800-1.
- The Basmachi Movement in Soviet Central Asia: A Study in Political Development
- Afghanistan and the Frontier
- Tarikhi-Junbash-i-Islami-Wa-Mili-Muslmanan-Asia-Miana-DarMuqabil-i-Communism-i-Russ. (Dari)
- The Evolution and Growth of Communism in Afghanistan (1917-79): An Appraisal
- Taaruf (Urdu)
- The impact of the great game on the Pashtuns/Afghans
