= Abdul Hai Habibi =

Afghan writer and historian

- عبدالحی حبیبی
- Born: 1910; Kandahar, Emirate of Afghanistan
- Died: 9 May 1984 (aged 73–74); Kabul, Democratic Republic of Afghanistan
- Occupations: Historian, politician, scholar, professor
- Writing career
- Subjects: History and academia
- Website: www.alamahabibi.com

Abdul-Hai Habibi (Pashto: عبدالحى حبيبي, Persian: عبدالحی حبیبی, romanized: Abd 'ul-Ḥay Ḥabībī) (1910 – 9 May 1984) was a prominent Afghan historian for much of his lifetime as well as a member of the National Assembly of Afghanistan (Afghan Parliament) during the reign of King Zahir Shah. A Pashtun nationalist, born to a Hazara enslaved mother, and a Pashtun father, from Kakar tribe of Kandahar, Afghanistan, he began as a young teacher who made his way up to become a writer, scholar, politician and Dean of Faculty of Literature at Kabul University. He is the author of over 100 books but is best known for editing Pata Khazana, an old Pashto language manuscript that he claimed to have discovered in 1944; but the academic community does not unanimously agree upon its genuineness.

== Biography ==
Habibi was born in 1910 in Kandahar, Afghanistan, to a Hazara mother who was enslaved and a Pashtun father. He was the great grandson of Allamah Habibullah, the eminent scholar known as "Kandahari intellectual" who authored many books. Habibi's father died at an early age and he grew up studying in the mosques of Kandahar, and in 1920 he was admitted to the primary school of Shalimar. Being good at his studies, he received his diploma at the age of 15 and began working as a teacher in the primary schools of Kandahar. In 1927 he was appointed as the deputy editor of Tulo Afghan weekly newspaper in Kandahar and 3 years later became the editor of the newspaper.

In 1950s, he was forced to exile by living in Peshawar, Pakistan, because of his opposition to Afghan Prime Minister Shah Mahmud Khan. While in exile, he published a journal called Azad Afghanistan (Free Afghanistan). He was permitted to return to Afghanistan in 1961 to become professor in the faculty of literature of Kabul University. In 1966, he was appointed president of Afghan Historical Society and he published a number of books on Afghan history. Senzil Nawid writes:

As a Pashtun, Habibi paid considerable attention to the history of the Pashto language and literature and the history of Pashtun dynasties, such as the Ludi and Suri Afghan dynasties in India; the Loyakan tribe of Ghazni; the Ghilji tribe of Qandahar; and the Abdali (or Durrani) dynasty that originated around Herat. One of the later important works of Habibi was Tarikh-i Afghanistan dar ‘Asr-i Gurgani-yi Hind (‘History of Afghanistan in the Age of the Gurgani Rulers of India’), which he published in Kabul in 1966. Here as elsewhere, he showed his great strength in his knowledge of primary sources. He made use of this knowledge to write his bibliographical Rahnuma-yi Tarikh-i Afghanistan (‘Guide to Afghan History’), which he published in two volumes in 1970. An important reference work that points to the genuine professionalism achieved by Afghan historians of the period...

— Afghan History Through Afghan Eyes, Writing National History

As an academic, Habibi worked diligently throughout his life. He is the author of 115 books and over 500 papers and articles on the literature, history, philosophy, linguistics, poetics and the culture of the people of Afghanistan. Several of his books have been translated to English, Arabic, German and other foreign languages.

Abdul Hai Habibi died on 9 May 1984, in Kabul, during the Soviet–Afghan War. He was 74 years old at the time of his death. He was fluent in Pashto and Dari.

== Summary of official positions ==
- Teacher in the primary schools of Kandahar, 1925–1927.
- Deputy editor of Tuloo-e Afghan newspaper, 1927–1931.
- Editor of Tuloo-e Afghan, 1931–1940.
- President of Pashto Academy (Pashto Tolana) in Kabul, 1940–1941 (at the same time he served as the Deputy President of the Department of Publications).
- Advisor to the Education Ministry in Kabul, 1941–1944.
- Chairman of the first College of Letters of Kabul University, and president of the Pashto Academy and professor of history of Pashto literature, 1944*–1946.
- President of the Education Department of Kandahar, 1946–1947.
- Commercial attaché in Quetta, Balochistan, 1947.
- Elected representative of Kandahar province during the 7th session of the National Assembly of Afghanistan (Afghan Parliament), 1948–1951.
- Received the rank of professor from Kabul University in 1965.
- President of Afghan Historical Society, 1966–1971.
- Advisor on cultural affairs to Prime Minister Mohammad Musa Shafiq, 1972–1973.
- Professor of literature and history, Kabul University, 1970–1977.
- Advisor to the Ministry of Information and culture, 1978–1982.

== Criticism ==
Pata Khazana, one of Habibi's major works, has been questioned by several prominent scholars for lacking strong evidence. British Iranologist, David Neil MacKenzie, concludes from the anachronisms that the document was fabricated only shortly before its claimed discovery in 1944. MacKenzie's central argument refers to the use of the modern Pashto letters Dze (ځ [dz]) and Nur (ڼ [ɳ]) throughout the script. These letters were only introduced into the Pashto alphabet in 1936 when the Afghan government reformed the Pashto orthography. The two letters have never been found simultaneously in any genuine manuscript before 1935.

Habibi responded to his critics in 1977 by stating:

"I obtained the hand-written manuscript with the help of the late Abdul Ali Khanozay, a Kakkar at Psheen in 1943. First I translated it into Persian, provided explanatory notes and annotations and published it in 1944 through the Pashto Academy. In 1961 five thousand copies of the original edition were published by the Publications and Translation Department. Due to the great demand for the book, the third edition was published in 1976 by the Pashto Development Board of the Ministry of Information and Culture. This edition contained a complete facsimile of the original hand-written manuscript. Since its publication 33 years ago different opinions have been expressed about this book and certain people have cast their doubts upon it. Some have said that I have composed the book while others have claimed that it was forged by Shah Hussain, son of Haji Mirwais Khan. Such claims have been heard over the years, but unfortunately, the critics have not compiled any detailed or scholastic analyses of the work so that they may be studied, and if found refutable, commented upon scholastically. Scholars in the field have not discussed this book in detail so far. What has been written has been brief and expressions of doubts. No scholastic or positive criticism from the viewpoint of linguistics or etymology has been provided so that the authenticity or forgery of words may be evaluated and the facts clarified."

— Abdul Hai Habibi, 1977

== See also ==
- Pata Khazana
- Ghulam Mohammad Ghobar
