= HASCO =

HASCO may refer to:

- Haitian American Sugar Company
- Help Afghan School Children Organization
