= Rahman Baba =

Pashtun Sufi saint and poet (c. 1653–1711)

Abdul Rahman Momand
- عبدالرحمن
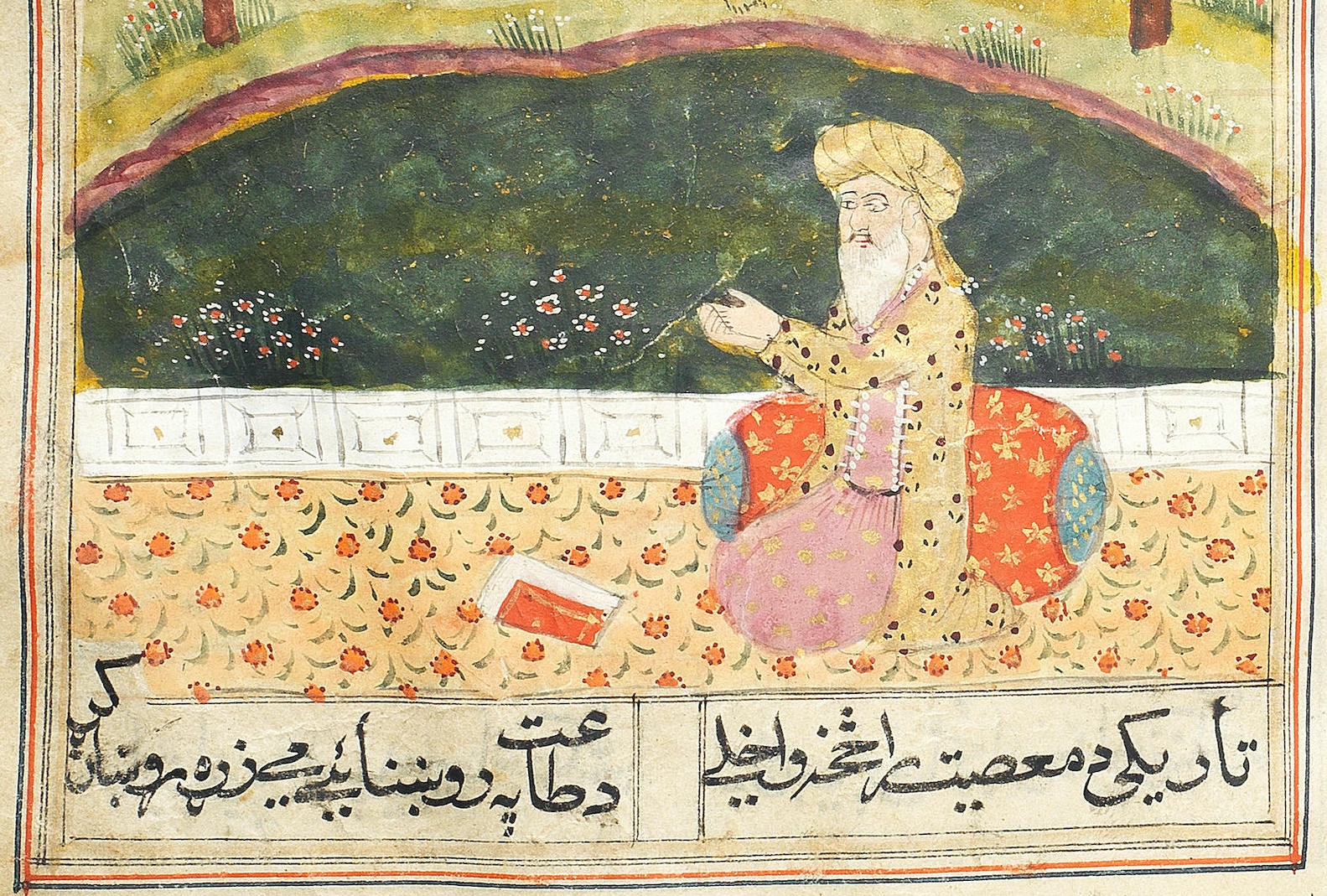
- Manuscript painting of Rahman Baba, commissioned by Abdullah Khan Alkozai, 1798

Personal life
- Born: 1042 AH (1632/1633 CE) Peshawar, Mughal Empire (present-day Khyber Pakhtunkhwa, Pakistan)
- Died: 1118 AH (1706/1707 CE); (aged 73–74 years) Peshawar, Mughal Empire
- Resting place: Peshawar, Pakistan
- Parent: Abdus Sattar Ghoryakhel (father)
- Notable work: Dīwān
- Known for: Pashto poetry

Religious life
- Religion: Sunni Islam
- Sect: Sufism
- Monastic name: Wali
- Profession: Poet

Abdur Rahmān Momand (Pashto: عبدالرحمان بابا; c. 1632 – 1706) or Rahmān Bābā (Pashto: رحمان بابا), was a renowned Afghan Sufi Saint, member of Sufi Dervish and poet from Peshawar (present-day Khyber Pakhtunkhwa, Pakistan) during the Mughal era. He, along with his contemporary Khushal Khan Khattak, is considered among the most popular poets of the Pashto language. His poetry expresses the mystical side of Islam, in line with his Sufi-oriented nature.

== Rahman's lineage ==
Opinion is divided about Rahman's family background. Several commentators are convinced that his family was village Malik (chieftains). However, Rahman Baba was more likely to have been a simple, though learned man. As he himself exclaimed: "Though the wealthy drink water from a golden cup, I prefer this clay bowl of mine."

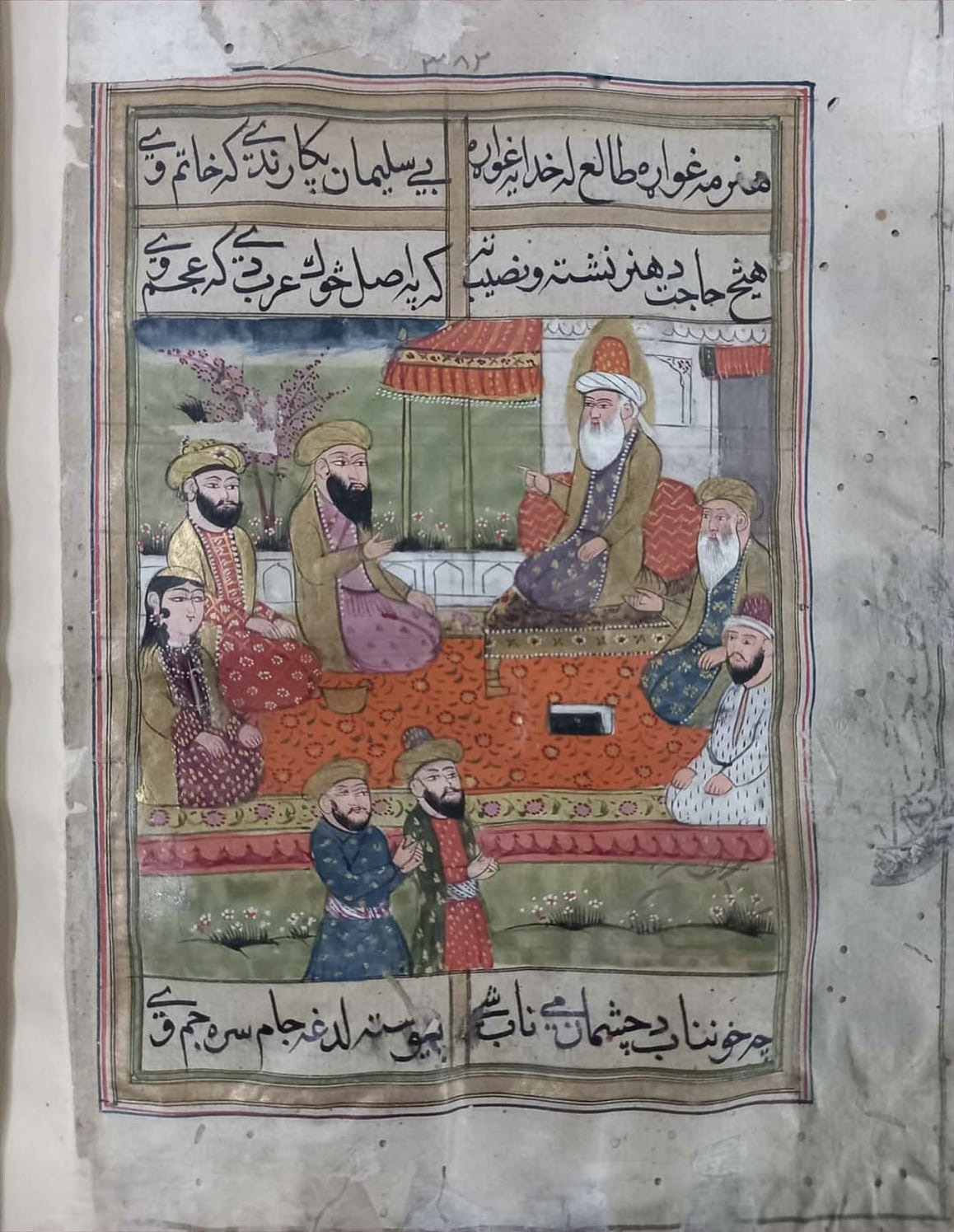
Illustrated page from a diwan (poetry collection) of the Pashtun Sufi poet Rahman Baba

== Published work ==
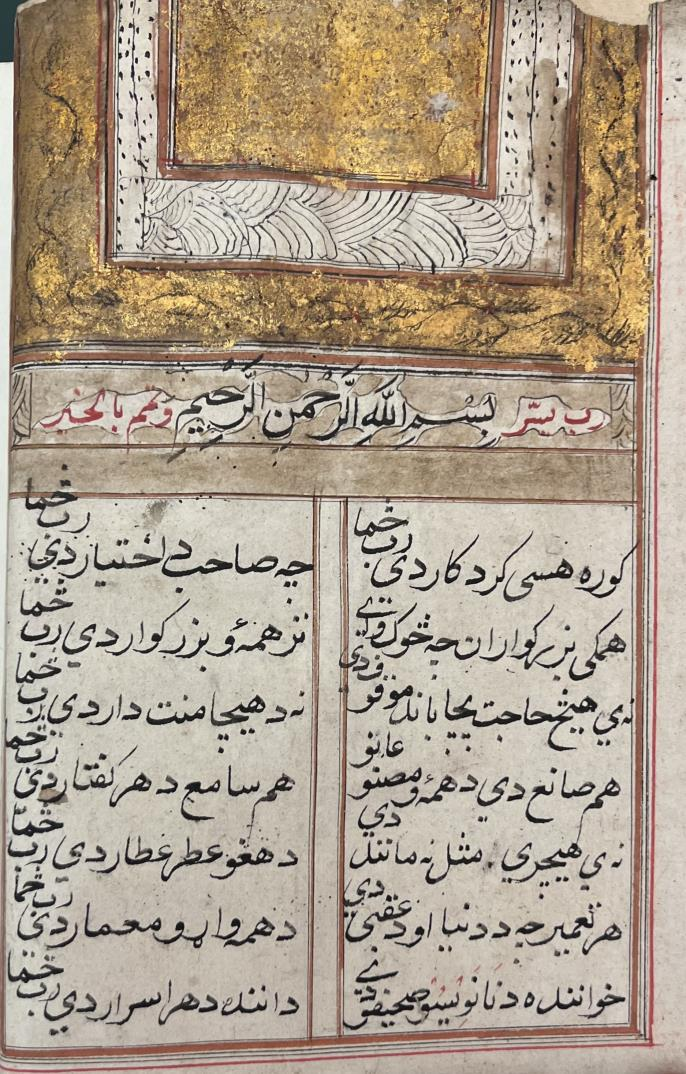
Folio of a Diwan-i-Rahman manuscript (Diwan-i-Rahman IO Islamic 2765)

A collection of Rahman's poetry, called the Dīwān ("anthology") of Rahman Baba, contains 343 poems, most of which are written in his native Pashto. The Dīwān of Rahman Baba was in wide circulation by 1728. There are over 25 original hand-written manuscripts of the Dīwān scattered in various libraries worldwide, including ten in the Pashto Academy in Peshawar, four in the British Library, three in the Bibliothèque Nationale in Paris, as well as copies in the John Rylands Library in Manchester, the Bodleian Library in Oxford and the University Library Aligath. The first printed version was collected by the Anglican Missionary T.P. Hughes and printed in Lahore in 1877. It is this version which remains the most commonly used to this day.

== Reputation ==
"Rahman Baba has received a large amount of praise. His work is regarded by many Pashtuns to be far more than poetry and next only to the Quran."

== Shrine ==
After his demise, poets, musicians and singers flocked to his gravesite annually. This annual congregation attained a festive status over the years which has carried on as part of Peshawar's rich cultural tradition to this day. However, on 5 March 2009, "militants" bombed Rahman Baba's tomb in Peshawar. "The high intensity device almost destroyed the grave, gates of a mosque, canteen and conference hall situated in the Rehman Baba Complex. Police said the bombers had tied explosives around the pillars of the tombs, to pull down the mausoleum". The shrine reopened in November 2012 after Rs. 39 million reconstruction.

== Recommended reading ==
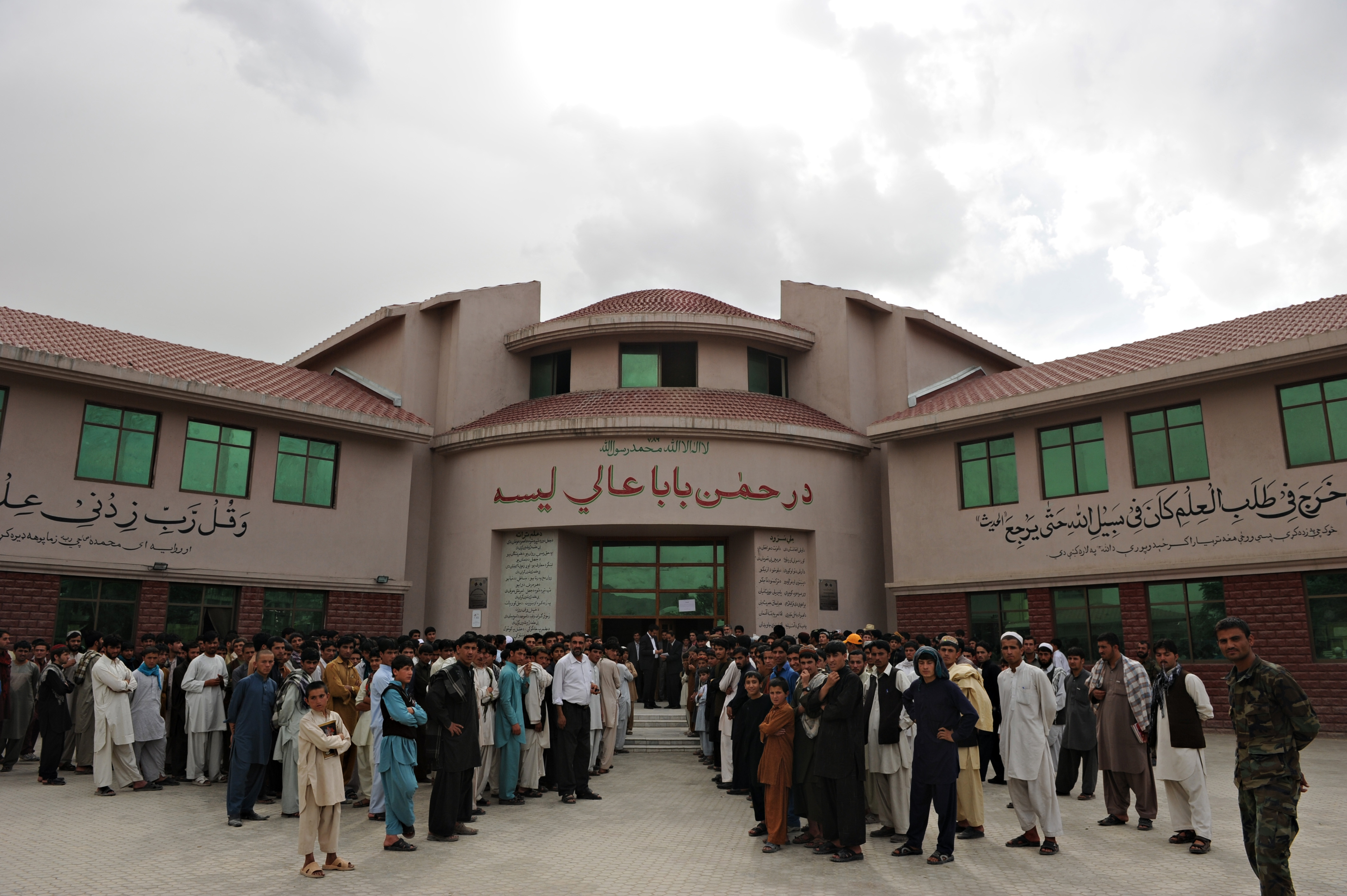
Rahman Baba High School in Kabul, Afghanistan

- H. G. Raverty, The Gulistan-i-Roh: Afghan Poetry and Prose
- H. G. Raverty, Selections from the Poetry of the Afghans, from the 16th to the 19th Century
- Abdur Rahman Baba, Robert Sampson, and Momin Khan. The Poetry of Rahman Baba: Poet of the Pukhtuns. Translated by Robert Sampson and Momin Khan. Peshawar: University Book Agency, 2005.
- Robert Sampson. "The Poetry of Rahman Baba: The Gentle Side of Pushtun Consciousness." Central Asia 52 (2003): 213–228.
- Robert Sampson and Momin Khan. Sow Flowers: Selections from Rahman Baba, the Poet of the Afghans. Peshawar: Interlit Foundation, 2008.
- Robert Sampson. "The War on Poetry: Snuffing out Folk Tradition Along the Pakistan-Afghan Border." The Frontier Post, 7 December 2008.
- Abdur Raḥmān Baba, Jens Enevoldsen, "The Nightingale of Peshawar: Selections from Rahman Baba." Interlit Foundation, 1993.
- Abdur Raḥmān Baba. "Rahman Baba: A Few Verses from His Deewan." Translated into English Rhyme by Hidayatullah Muhibkhel Arbab Mohmand.

== See also ==
- Khushal Khan Khattak
- Abdul Ghani Khan
- Ameer Hamza Shinwari
- Raj Wali Shah Khattak
