= Pareshan Khattak =

Pashto poet and educator

Professor Pareshan Khattak TI SI
- پرشان خټک

Chairman of Pashto Academy

Personal details
- Born: Ghamay Jan Khattak; December 10, 1931 Karak, NWFP
- Died: April 16, 2009 (aged 77) Hayatabad
- Known for: Pashto Poetry Legend and Educator

Pareshan Khattak (Pashto: پری شان خٹک), (10 December 1932 – 16 April 2009) real name Gahami Jan Khattak was a former Vice-Chancellor, Pashto poet and writer and former Chairman University Grants Commission.

Born in Karak, Pakistan he joined education department in 1958, after obtaining a master's degree in History, he joined the Pashto Academy as Assistant Research Officer. Due to his exceptional talent and leadership skills, he was then named as Director and then Chairman of the Pashto academy.

== Literary works ==
His book (in Urdu) entitled, “Pashtoon Koon” (Who are Pashtoons ?) was one of the best sellers throughout the country, and is considered an authoritative reference on its subject matter. Professor Pareshan Khattak has written various masterpieces in Pashto literature including “Drana Pakhto” and “Leek Dood.” In addition, Professor Sahab has published his poetry under the title of “Tanakay” and “Hagha Dwa Malalaye Stargay.”

The poetry of Professor Pareshan Khattak is mostly in the form of Nazam, and Ghazaal and most of his works are considered as masterpieces in Pashto Literature. The reader while going through the contents of his poetry becomes enchanted in the selection of words and the philosophy shaping his poetry. His books titled “Pukhtana Kochay,” “Dozakhi Pakhto,” “Drana Pukhtana,” “Khyber,” “Iteraff,” and “Aziza Meena” are popular reads in Khyber-Pakhtunkhwa, Pakistan and pashtun regions of Afghanistan.

He also served as Chairman Pakistan Academy of Letters in 1984-85 and Professor in Gomal University, Dera Ismail Khan.

== See also ==
Raj Wali Shah Khattak
