= Riaz Tasneem =

Pakistani poet, literary critic, research scholar (1969-2017)

- ریاض تسنیم
- Born: 1969; Swatu village, Charsadda District, Pakistan
- Died: 4 December 2017 (aged 47–48); Karachi, Sindh, Pakistan
- Resting place: Rasheedabad, SITE Town
- Education: Islamia College University; University of Karachi
- Occupations: Poet, Literary critic, Research scholar
- Writing career
- Language: Pashto, Urdu
- Subjects: Literary journals, Research

Riaz Tasneem (1969 – 4 December 2017; sometimes spelled Riaz Tasnim or Riyaz Tasneem), was a Pakistani poet, literary critic and research scholar who primarily wrote poems in Pashto and Urdu language throughout his literary career. He is believed to have played a significant contribution to Pashto language and literature.

== Early life ==
Riaz was born in 1969 at Swatu village of Charsadda district in Khyber Pakhtunkhwa. He received his initial schooling from Islamia College University at Peshawar, and later moved to Karachi where he did his graduation from the University of Karachi as a private candidate. After completing his education, Riaz then joined law enforcement task force and subsequently served teacher at a private school. He originally started his career at a Pashto newspaper called Wahdat and served as a sub-editor. As a writer, he was also involved in literary events. He contributed to Urdu newspapers and literary journals on numerous literary topics, including research.

== Literary work ==
As a progressive poet, Riaz established his poetic associations with literary organizations in Pashto and Urdu. He published his Pashto poetry collection in 2003 entitled "Da Kum Rang May Kasheed Karhay", and subsequently published his second and third poetry collections in Pashto language entitled "Chandarh" and "Za Ka Da Waray Oda Shwam". He is also credited for researching and publishing Khushal Khattak's poetry entitled "Da Khushal Intekhab". Later, he started writing literary Journalistic essays in Urdu language called "Bed No. 28". However, it was not published due to his financial crisis. He contribution was also involved in a Pashto journal called Jaras.

== Death ==
Riaz was suffering from chronic liver disease and died of cirrhosis at a Karachi hospital on 4 December 2017. He is buried in Rasheedabad, SITE Town, Karachi of Sindh province.
