= Help Afghan School Children Organization =

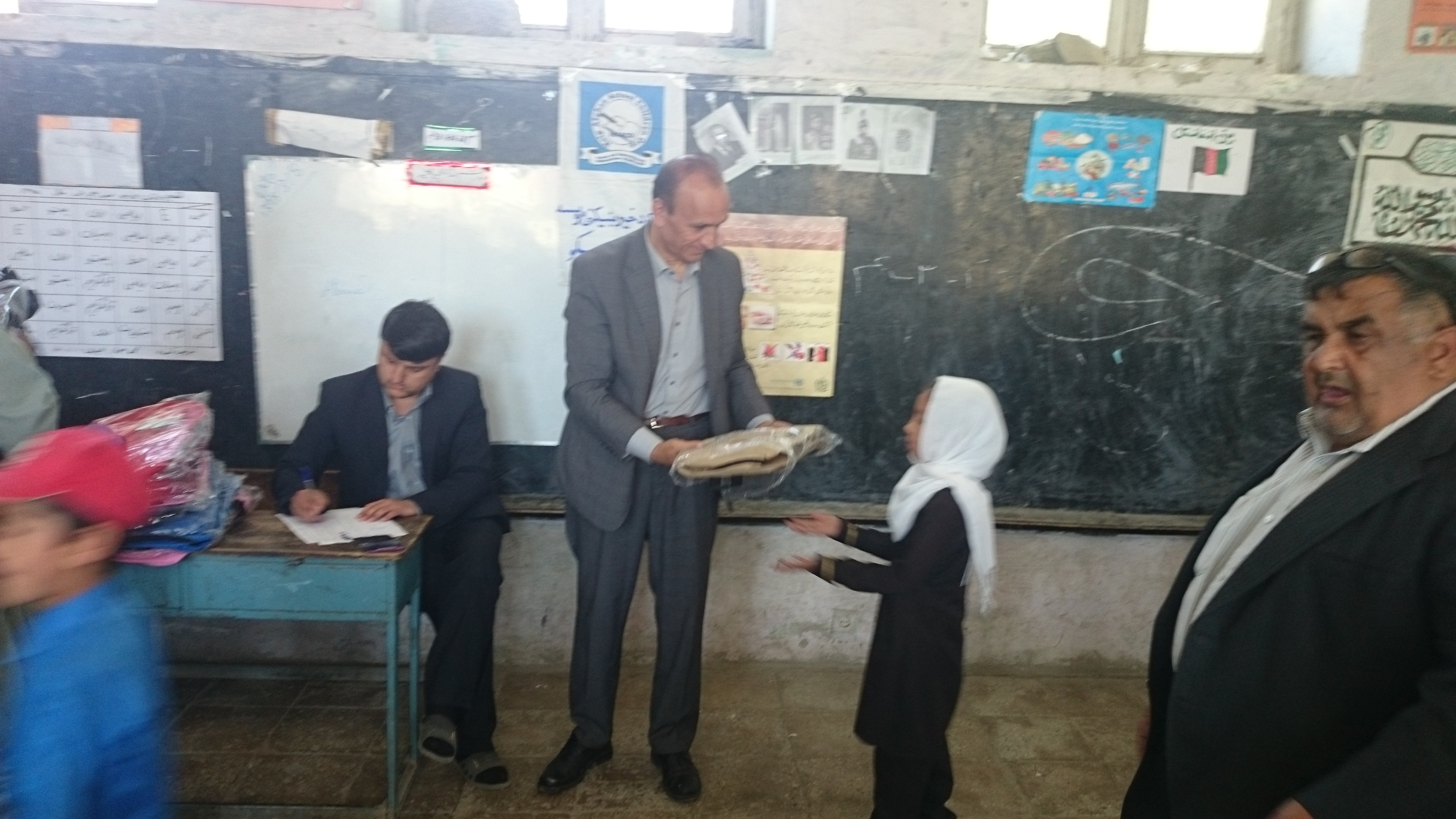
HASCO Founder Hafizullah Khaled distribute Backpack to an Afghan school child

Help Afghan School Children Organization (HASCO)

Help Afghan School Children Organization (HASCO) is a Vienna-based non-profit, non-partisan organization dedicated to the promotion of education of Afghan disadvantaged children. HASCO was founded in 2002 by an Afghan humanitarian Hafizullah Khaled.

HASCO members work on a voluntary basis. HASCO volunteers in different countries spend their time and expertise to help Afghan disadvantaged children. HASCO mostly focuses on the education of Afghan poor children and helping Afghan refugees families at refugee camps in Pakistan and Iran to send their school-age children to school.

During last six years, HASCO has supported thousands of needy Afghan schoolchildren by providing them with school supplies, school bags, monthly contributions and other school necessities such as thermos, school caps, school clothes, and so on. Hasco volunteers also conducted rehabilitation works in schools recently burned by the Taliban in the eastern Afghan province of Laghman.

HASCO's big school supplies distribution programme has been launched under the name of Hope's Journey Caravan in June 2005 with the full co-operation of local education authorities and representatives of the Afghan Ministry of Education. During this operation, a large quantity of school supplies have been distributed to tens of schools in the Shamali Plains north of Kabul.

== HASCO Volunteer gets UN Award ==
Mrs.Allwatiah selected by UNV as Volunteer of the Year 2006

HASCO is a non-profit organization consisting dedicated volunteers from different countries; during last four years a large number of online volunteers have been introduced to HASCO by United Nations Volunteers Programme (UNV). These volunteers generously spent their time and expertise to make difference in the life of Afghan children. HASCO volunteers are from different countries such as Afghanistan, Austria, Australia, Brazil, Canada, Japan, Jordan, Egypt, Germany, Greece, Oman, UK, and United States.

On 5 December 2006 the United Nations Volunteers Programme (UNV) selected HASCO online volunteer Mrs. Allwatiah with other nine volunteers as online UNV Volunteer of the Year 2006. Mrs. Allwatiah is an Omani national, a mother of five children and head of the English department at a school in Oman. The United Nations Volunteers (UNV) Program, has highlighted in the February 2008 newsletter the experience of HASCO Online volunteers to promote the ideals of volunteerism around the world. The UNV newsletter explained how HASCO online volunteer Daniela is helping the organization to reach out to the German-speaking public and potential donors by translating project proposals, reports and press releases from English to German. One day, her instant reaction to an assignment within a 24-hour deadline resulted in the donation of 1,000 schoolbags by the Municipality of Vienna.

In Afghanistan voluntary work plays an important role in the implementation of HASCO projects. HASCO volunteers, including female volunteers, actively participated in Hope's Journey Program to distribute school supplies to tens of boys and girls schools from Bagram airport to Kabul city.

== Programmes and Ppojects ==
During more than three decades war and destruction in Afghanistan, children were among the main victims of long year's war and bloodshed in their country. War not only killed and injured thousands of innocent Afghan children but at the same time thousands others were deprived from their basic right of education and schooling.

Today one of the big challenges of Afghan poor families is how to provide their school age children with school supplies and school needs. The conditions of those Afghan families recently returned from Pakistan and Iran refugee camps are not better than those living in Afghanistan on arrival at their village. They met only the ruins of their houses and farms. These families need assistance to send their children to school.

== Hope's Journey Caravan ==
To provide a large amount of basic school materials to thousands of needy school children in different communities and to avoid long bureaucratic barrier in distribution process, HASCO organized Hope's Journey Caravan in north of Kabul. During this one day humanitarian trip a large amount of school supplies have been distributed to tens of boys and girls schools in Qarabagh, Kalakan and Mir Bacha Kot districts in north of Kabul. Additional to HASCO volunteers, local education authorities and representatives of the Ministry of Education also participated in school supplies distribution process.

The school supplies have been collected during first part of Hope's Journey in United States by Cary Ragsdale, director of Hope's Journey Organization, Beau Moore, his closest friend, and tens of school children and teachers in United States for supporting Afghanistan school children.

== School rehabilitation programme ==
With deterioration of the security situation in Afghanistan, tens of schools have burned by Taliban extremists in south and eastern part of Afghanistan. With burning each school once again hundreds of innocent Afghan children have been deprived from their basic right of education. These schools were set alight at the time while education authorities still are not able to rebuild hundreds of destroyed schools during civil war in Afghanistan and most of schools in Afghanistan are without class, desks and chairs. Children are sitting on the floor during school time.

Under HASCO School Rehabilitation programme five schools have been rehabilitated in eastern province of Laghman.

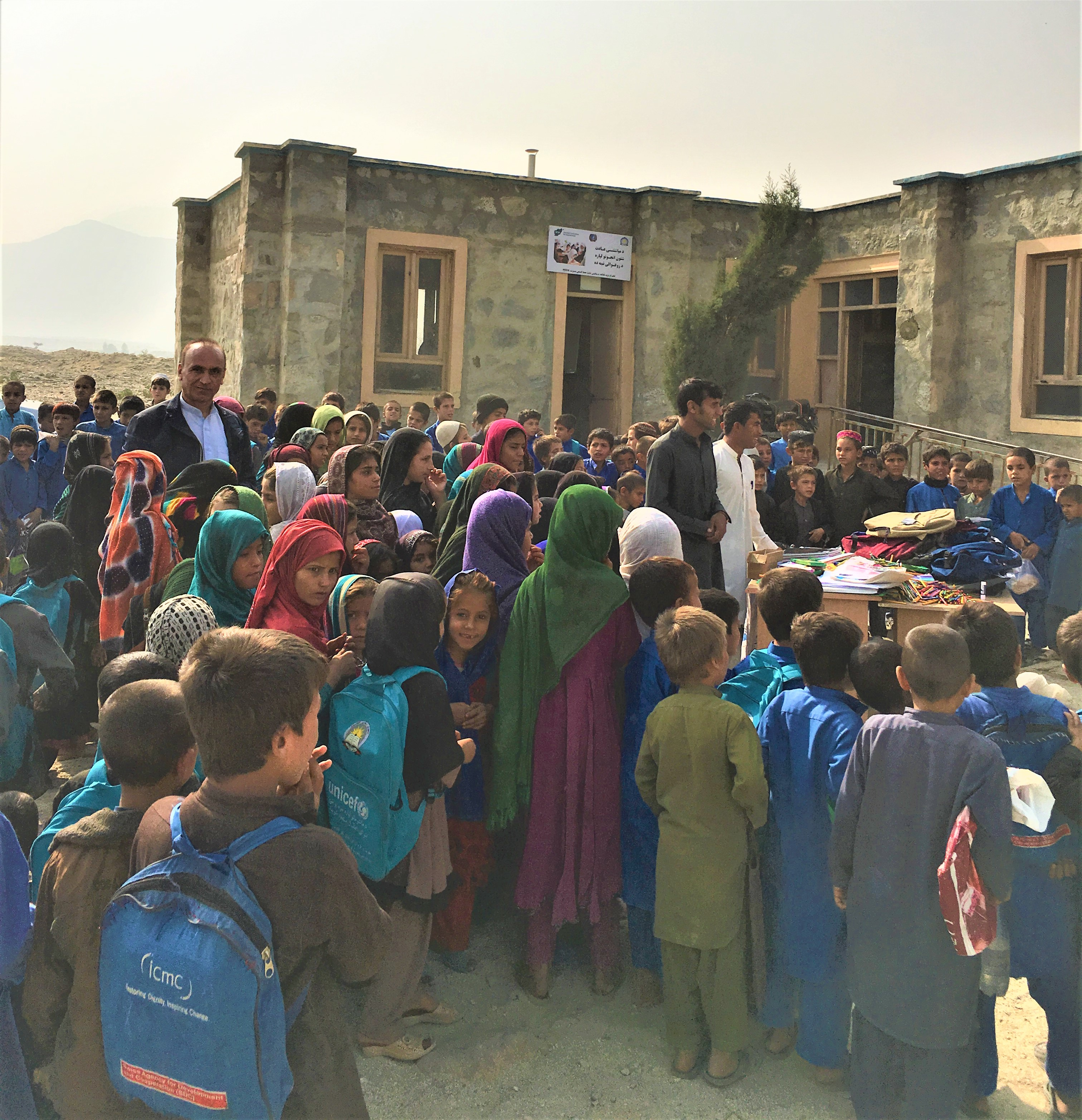
Hasco Director with Afghan School Children

== Backpacks for Afghan school children ==
Most of schools in Afghanistan province and districts are far and children have a long daily walk ahead of them in order to reach their schools. In some areas, children cross several hinders such as rivers, bridges and mountainous terrain to reach their school. Providing Afghan children with schoolbag will help them to carry more easily their daily school materials.

Furthermore, to encourage Afghan families keep their children in school, additional to backpack and school supplies, other needs of school children such as school caps, thermos and school clothes were distributed by HASCO in different part of Afghanistan.

== Orphan sponsorship programme ==
As a result of long year's civil war and bloodshed today there are a huge number of orphans and disabled children in Afghanistan. Most of Afghan poverty stricken families are living without regular income. Their everyday life is a struggle for survival. The aim of HASCO orphans sponsorship programme is to assist Afghan orphans and poor families by providing a specific amount of monthly contribution to cover school supplies and other necessities of their school children.
