= Hafizullah Khaled =

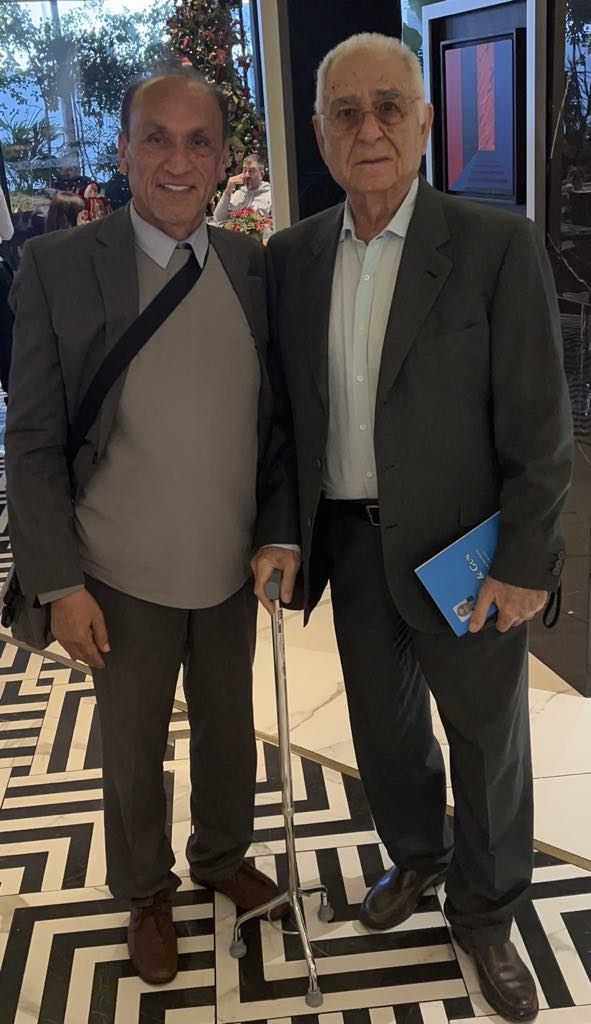
Former UN Special envoy for Afghanistan Mr.Benon Sevan (right) with Mr. Hafizullah Khaled

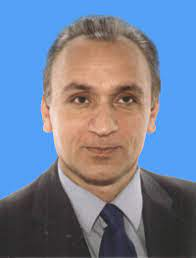
Hafizullah Khaled

Hafizullah Khaled (Persian: حفیظ الله خالد) is an Afghan-Austrian humanitarian, peace activist, writer and founder of the Help Afghan School Children Organization (HASCO) based in Vienna (Austria).

== Early life ==
Hafizullah Khaled was born on 1958 in Pacha Khel Village of Laghman province, He was only five years old when his family moved to Kabul City, Khaled's father Mirza Mohammadullah Khan was a government employee during the reign of Zahir Shah, the former King of Afghanistan.

== Education and career ==
Hafizullah Khaled completed his primary Education at Ostad Betab Primary School and his Secondary education at Kabul Ansari High School in 1973, He received his licentiate degree in law and political science from Kabul University in 1978.

He worked as liaison officer to the United Nations Good Offices Mission in Afghanistan and Pakistan (UNGOMAP) and Office of the UN Secretary-General in Afghanistan and Pakistan (OSGAP) in late 1980s under Benon Sevan, the special envoy representative of United Nation Secretary-General in Afghanistan.

After the Geneva Agreement on the withdrawal of Soviet troops from Afghanistan was signed between Afghanistan and Pakistan under the auspices of the United Nations on 8 April 1988, Mr Benon Sevan as the special envoy of the UN Secretary-General was assigned to transfer power peacefully to a neutral interim government in Afghanistan. His peace plan was blocked in the last days of its implementation.

== Humanitarian work ==
To support Education of Afghan Children, in 2002 Khaled founded Help Afghan School Children Organization (HASCO) in Vienna HASCO is a not-for-profit, non-political organization dedicated to assisting Afghan returnees and displaced families to send their children to school.HASCO promotes Education of Afghan Children through different projects such as School Supplies distribution Program, creating Home School in Villages, Sponsorship of Afghan Orphans and needy children, Khaled has travelled several times to different part of Afghanistan in order to assist orphans and disadvantaged children and promote non-violent education for Afghan children. In July 2007, Hafizullah Khaled was appointed as "Person of the Month" by the University-Community Partnership for Social Action Research Network for his role in assisting Afghan poor children and promoting education in Afghanistan.

In recent years, Hafizullah Khaled has aligned with many different Afghanistan-related organizations for the betterment of the Afghan people. His focus is mainly on children's rights, welfare and establishing peaceful nations.

== Writing ==
Khaled has written numerous articles and poems in both Afghan official languages (Pashto and Persian). His poems spread the message of peace among Afghans to defend the rights of disadvantaged children. Some of his poems such as “Children the Flowers of our Garden” (Pashto poem),”Curse on war” ای جنګ لعنتی (Persian poem),"Why this continued war?" چرا این جنگ بی پایان (Persian poem), and "My dream" زما ارمان (Pashto poem) have appeared on several Afghan websites and publications. On the eve of the September 2009 International Day of Peace, Khaled published a collection of his poems entitled “The Message of Peace”. The poems and articles in this book devoted to promote peace and stability in war-torn Afghanistan. The proceeds from the sale of the book were used to promote education of Afghan children and assist Afghan orphans and needy school children.

Khaled has written a monograph about his experiences where he explained the need for reducing huge military expenditures and spending these resources for social and economic development such as building schools for children, health facilities and supplying drinking water for poor people all over the world.

In May 2016, Khaled published another peace-promoting book, "Pen & Gun", being a collection of anti-war, anti-violence poetry in Dari and Pashto. In this latest book, Khaled encouraged Afghans, in particular, the younger generation, to educate themselves and use pens and books instead of guns and bullets.

== Guinness world record ==
In addition to his humanitarian activities and writing, Khaled also grows flowers and trees during his free time. In 2022, Khaled became the Guinness Record holder for the world tallest rose bush at 8.705 m. This was verified on 17 October 2020 in Vienna, Austria. Khaled has been quoted as saying “For me, bush rose is a symbol of beauty, friendship and love”.
