= Miana Gondal =

Village in Pakistan

Coordinates: 32°22′N 73°09′E

Miana Gondal is a village in Mandi Bahauddin District, Punjab, Pakistan. It is in Malakwal tehsil of the district.
