= Pir Mohammad Karwan =

Pir Mohammad Karwan پیر محمد کاروان
- Citizenship: Afghanistan
- Occupation: Drama writer
- Known for: Poetry and short stories

Pir Mohammad Karwan (Pashto: پیر محمد کاروان) is a prominent and contemporary poet writing in the Pashto language.

== Academic life ==
Karwan has published four collections of poetry and two collections of short stories.

Poetry books:

- La Mashama Tar Mashama - له ماښامه تر ماښامه
- Chinar Khabari Kawee - چنار خبرې کوي
- Da Shapiray Warghawai - د ښاپېرۍ ورغوی
- Zarzari Wazare - زرزري وزرې

Short stories:

- La Nargisa Tar Nargisa - له نرګسه تر نرګسه
- Ghrah Ta Rawan Saray - غره ته روان سړی

== Work life ==
Currently, Karwan works with BBC's Afghan education drama project as a drama writer.

Karwan is one of the founding father of the Afghan Literary Movement, aimed at nurturing new generation of Afghan poets. The movement was founded in the late 1980s by the then refugee Afghan poets, Siddique Pasarly, Nisar Haris, Mustafa Salik and Pir Muhammad Karwan in Peshawar city. This non-profit movement has given birth to many inspiring poets and writers in this war-torn country. Currently the movement is operating from the Cinema Pamir building in Kabul. The movement has a principle stand not to accept any donations, funds etc. in a bid to secure its independence.

== Translation ==
His poem Flower and Man has been translated into English by the Poetry Translation Centre.
