= Farigh Bukhari =

Pakistani poet and writer (1917–1977)

- فارغ بخاری
- Syed Mir Ahmed Shah a.k.a. Farigh Bukhari
- Born: Syed Mir Akbar Shah; 11 November 1917; Peshawar, British India, (present-day Pakistan)
- Died: 13 April 1997 (aged 79); Peshawar, Pakistan
- Occupations: Poet, writer
- Writing career
- Pen name: Farigh Bukhari
- Language: Urdu, Pashto, Hindko
- Years active: 1934–1997
- Period: Bangladesh Liberation War
- Subjects: Politics, Social, Literature
- Literary movement: Progressive Writers' Movement

Akbar Shah (11 November 1917 – 13 April 1997), known by his pen name as Farigh Bukhari (romanized: Fārigh Buk̲h̲ārī), was a Pakistani multilingual poet and progressive writer. He wrote books, including poetry on various subjects such as literature, social issues and politics in Hindko, Pashto and predominantly in Urdu language. Some of his publications appear about universal values and humanism.

Farigh was born in British India (in modern-day Peshawar, Pakistan). (Note: He was born before 1947 (i.e in British India)) He along with Raza Hamdani is credited with introducing Urdu literature to Pukhtuns of Attock city, making him the 20th century's first writer of Peshawar translating Urdu into Pashto literature. (Note: 20th century's first writer only in Peshawar, not world's first writer)

== Literary career ==
He started writing around in 1934, and participated in a mushaira in Calcutta (now Kolkata) where he recited his first-ever ghazal presided over an Urdu poet Raza Ali Wahsat. Besides gazals, a few of his poetic conversations appear emotional and imaginative. He used to criticise wars through his poetry. In 1971, he wrote about East Pakistan (in modern-day Bangladesh), and covered historical events of the war. Later, he opposed military conflicts occurring in East Bengal through one of his poetry collections titled the tragedy of East Bengal.

Prior to writing about 1971, he wrote an Urdu poetry collection titled Zairo Bam in January 1952, and his house in Peshawar was subsequently raided by the local police who arrested him for his not-known involvement in keeping the formula of an explosive device called "zero bomb". He was also imprisoned, and later displaced for writing about politics involving plural society and social justice. In 1991, he wrote a book titled Tahrik-i Azadi Aur Baca Khan (Freedom movement and Bacha Khan) (Note: see bibliography section for book citation) on a Pashtun activist Abdul Ghaffar Khan covering his independence struggle and political movements carried out during the period of partition. The book was later published by the University of California on 5 March 2007.

== Bibliography ==
- Buk̲h̲Ārī, Fārig̲h̲ (1974). سرحد كے لوک گيت.
- Buk̲h̲Ārī, Fārig̲h̲ (1978). Albam.
- Buk̲h̲Ārī, Fārig̲h̲ (1978). خوشبو کا سفر.
- Buk̲h̲Ārī, Fārig̲h̲ (1982). Farigh's poems: Songs of love & struggle.
- Buk̲h̲Ārī, Fārig̲h̲ (1982). Piyāsī hāth.
- Buk̲h̲Ārī, Fārig̲h̲ (1982). Dūsrā albam: Qalmī k̲h̲āke.
- Buk̲h̲Ārī, Fārig̲h̲ (1983). G̲h̲azaliyyah.
- Buḵh̲Ārī, Fārig̲h̲ (1991). Tahrik-i azadi aur baca Khan.
