= Sahib Shah Sabir =

Pakistani poet (1956–2007)

- صاحب شاه صابر
- Born: 1956 CE; Sakhakot, Malakand, Khyber Pakhtunkhwa, Pakistan
- Died: April 03, 2007 CE (aged 51); Peshawar, Khyber Pakhtunkhwa, Pakistan
- Writing career
- Genre: Pashto poetry

Sahib Shah Sabir (Pashto: صاحب شاه صابر; 1956–2007) was a renowned poet of the Pashto language in the modern era. He held a PhD degree in literature along with three master's degrees in Pashto literature, Urdu literature, and political science, all from the University of Peshawar.

He has numerous published works including the poetry collections of Khobona and Takal along with other books written about Pashto literature.

Karan Khan, a popular modern Pashto singer and poet, has released a complete audio album consisting of his Ghazals and Nazms titled Bya Hagha Makham De. His poetry is also sung by other notable singers such as Sardar Ali Takkar.

== Personal life ==
Sahib Shah Sabir was born in 1956 in Malakand Division, Khyber Pakhtunkhwa, Pakistan, where he also spent his early life and graduated from school. He later moved to Peshawar to continue his higher education and literary career.

Sahib Shah Sabir was a very rebellious (سرکشه) and arrogant (خو داره انسان) man since he was a student. The late Dr Sabir remained a very active member of Pashtun Student Federation. Rehmat Shah Sail (رحمت شاه سائل), one of his great friends and the great Pashto poet, says about his political life and thinking:

"He then joined the Pashtun Student Federation, and at Tahani College, where a few of our other friends had founded poetry, he took the lead. Now he was well-known as a student leader. He then went to Mardan College, where he ran the crazy race that won the presidency of his federation for the first time in a year. After the victory, he marched to Kalpanari. The next day, someone said that Bacha Khan had come to the place of Amirzada Khan.There, in the form of a procession (جلوس), they took young men, and on the third day they marched on the streets with songs and drumming, and went to Rahat Khan Baba's Hujra, then to Sadiq Saib, who had become their president. We spent the night in the area and the youngsters, despite being very tired, danced in front of the dances and dances till dawn ... "

Sahib Shah Sabir died on April 3, 2007, in Peshawar, Pakistan.

== Published works ==
Sahib Shah Sabir has numerous published books both on poetry and prose, including the following:

- Takal (poetry)
- Khobona (poetry)
- Waore aw Gulona (stories)
- Pukhtana aw Pakhto Tappa (research)
- Ranna aw Gulona (article collection)

== Unpublished works ==
تنقید او د تنقید ډولونه (ناچاپ)

په پښتو شاعرۍ کښي ټولنیز مافیعت (د ایمفل تیسز) ناچاپ

رڼا او رنګونه(مقالي) ناچاپ

== Poetry ==
The late Sabir was a free-thinking writer and poet. His thoughts and ideas were close to the Western world. He would always say that when our society (Pashtuns) will compete with the rest of the world in the field of science and development. He would recommend education to every young person. He would say:

ذرې ذرې شي چې رڼا ته رسي لمر ته رسي

ستوري د سختو نه تېريږي چې سحر ته رسي

چي نښه وي مئین کوڅه د جانان وپېژني

د مات ټیکري په درک سړی ګدر ته رسي

په ما هم هغه څوک د کفر ګواهي ورکوي

څوک چې زما په زور محراب ته ځي،ممبر ته رسي

غر د پیریانو، ښاپیرۍ د تورابان ورسي

زمونږ د مینې قیصه سر وخوري چې سر ته رسي
