= Bacha Khan University =

Public university in Khyber Pakhtunkhwa, Pakistan

Coordinates: 34°08′11.6″N 71°50′17.5″E

Bacha Khan University, Charsadda
- باچا خان یونیورسٹی، باچا خان پوهنتون
- Type: Public
- Established: 2012
- Affiliations: HEC
- Chancellor: Governor of Khyber Pakhtunkhwa
- Vice-Chancellor: Prof. Dr. Bashir Ahmad (Pride of Performance)
- Dean: Prof. Dr. Abdus Sattar
- Location: Charsadda, Khyber Pakhtunkhwa, Pakistan
- Website: Official website

Bacha Khan University (Pashto: باچا خان پوهنتون) (Urdu: جامعہ باچاخان) is a public university situated in Charsadda, Khyber Pakhtunkhwa, Pakistan, named after Abdul Ghaffar Khan (Bacha Khan). The university was founded on 3 July 2012 with the mission to advance knowledge and learning through quality research and education for Pakistan.

Currently, the university's campus consists of 25 acres, with another 97 acres of land being purchased near Charsadda motorway interchange. More than 3000 students are enrolled in BS, Masters and MS/MPhil degree programs. There are two men's and one women's hostel at the campus.

In January 20, 2016, at least 20 people were killed in the university by Pakistani Taliban terrorists attack.

== Departments ==
Bacha Khan University offers education in the following areas:

- Agriculture
- Biotechnology
- Botany & Zoology
- Chemistry
- Computer Science & Electronics
- Economics
- English
- Geology & Geophysics
- Management Science
- Mathematics and Statistics
- Pakhtunkhwa Study Centre
- Pharmacy
- Sociology & Gender Studies & Education
- Bachelor of Business Administration

== See also ==
- List of universities in Khyber Pakhtunkhwa
