= Abaseen Yousafzai =

Pakistani Pashto language poet

- اباسين يوسفزے
- Born: 19 February 1964; Khanpur, Lower Dir, Pakistan
- Education: MA. LLB. University of Peshawar, Ph.D. Pashto literature Islamia College University
- Occupations: Writer; Poet; Professor
- Writing career
- Language: Pashto, Urdu, English
- Years active: 1964–present
- Genres: Poem, Ghazal, Research, Criticism
- Subjects: Social Sciences, Literature
- Notable works: Ghurzanguna, Alwat, Maraam, Roohnama, Zaitoon Bano, Khutbaat-E-Imam Khatab, Sadako's Prayer, Understanding FATA, Da Pakhtunkhwa Bani, Pakhtun Hamza, Qisomara Tror
- Notable awards: Pride of Performance
- Movement: پوهنتون ادبي ستوري

Abaseen Yousafzai (Pashto: اباسين يوسفزے, Urdu: اباسین یوسفزئی) is a Pakistani Pashto and Urdu language poet. He joined the Islamia College University as a lecturer of Pashto in 1993 and is the chairman of the Pashto Department at the University. His poetry has been published on both sides of the Durand Line.

== Works ==
Yousafzai has written three poetry collections: Ghurzanguna (1994), Alwat (2005), and Maraam (2016). Ghurzanguna has been published in up to ten editions and Alwat in five. Alwat was launched at a ceremony organized by the Abasin Arts Council. His book, Da Pakhtunkhwa Bani, is a biography of Malek Ahmad Baba, who founded the State of Pakhtunkhwa in 1520. His Ph.D. thesis, titled "Concept of nationality in the poetry of Hamza Shinwari", explored the concept of nationalism in Pashto poetry.

== Literary services and contributions ==
Yousafzai is a Pashto poet, research scholar, literary critic, and columnist. He was born in 1964 in Khanpur, Lower Dir, Khyber Pakhtunkhwa. He earned an LLB from University of Peshawar in 1986, a master's degree in Pashto literature in 1988, and completed his Ph.D. in Pashto in 2016. He has written books in Pashto and Urdu and received awards for his contributions to literature and culture.

According to sources, Yousafzai has been awarded the Presidential Award by the Government of Afghanistan and the Pride of Performance by the Government of Pakistan for his contributions to Pashto literature and media.

Yousafzai has been active in Pashto literature for over 40 years. He has published three Pashto poetry collections: Ghurzangoona (1994), Alwat (2005), and Maraam (2016).

He has also published prose books and designed the Pashto curriculum for Khyber Pakhtunkhwa's schools. He has anchored TV and radio shows, written scripts, and conducted programs for various channels, including PTV and FM stations.

Yousafzai has worked on literary and cultural projects with the Khyber Pakhtunkhwa Culture Directorate and is affiliated with literary and cultural organizations in Pakistan.
