= Rahmat Shah Sail =

Poet

Rahmat Shah Sahil رحمت شاه سائل
- Born: 1950 (age 75–76)
- Citizenship: Pakistan
- Known for: Pashto poetry

Rahmat Shah Sail (Pashto: رحمت شاه سائل - born 1950, writer) is a Pashtoon poet in the Pashto language, belongs to the Utmankhel tribe.

== Early life ==
Rahmat Shah Sail is the son of Amin Gul and Khana Bibi belongs to the Utmankhel tribe. Sail was born in the Dargai village of Wartier in Malakand Agency, Pakistan. At the age of five, Sail was admitted to a local primary school; however, he was compelled to leave school after the third grade to assist his parents in earning a living.

== Notable works ==
- Da Weer Pa Chum Ka War Da Naghmu (د وير په چم کې وار د نغمو دی)
- Da Lumbu pa Soori (د لمبو په سيوري)
- Da Khaistoonu Da Sparly Badoona (د ښايستونو د سپرلي بادونه)
- Dard Che De Sareeko Sangay Wosparalay (درد چې د څړيکو څانګې وسپړلې)
- De weeno Rang Pa Lambo Sanga Khkarey (د وينو رنګ په لمبو څنګه ښکاري؟)
- Ta La Tasweer Pa Gulaab Joor Kram Ka Na (تاله تصوير په ګلاب جوړ کړم که نه)
- Halaat Che Aor Awrawey (حالات چې اور اوروي)
- De Chinaroono Na Lambay Wowatay (د چينارونو نه لمبې ووتې)
- Ta Ba Pa Khpal Tasweer Kay Sook Zayaway (ته به په خپل تصوير کې څوک ځايوي)
- Za De Khazaan De Panay Panay Sara Worzhabdam (زه د خزان د پاڼې پاڼې سره ورژېدم)
- Akhrey Sandara (آخري سندره)
- Ya Zra Gure dalta ba Gul na spare (يه زړۀ ګورے دلته به ګل نۀ سپړې)
- Nargis Bimar Bimar (نرګس بیمار بیمار)
- Da Tanqeed Mashriq aw maghrib (د تنقید مشرق او مغرب)
- Jwand Aw Fann dwara da yaw bal Ayeni (ژوند اؤ فن دواڑہ د یوبل ائینے)
- Gharmi Lambii, Lambii (غرمے لمبے لمبے)
- Da Bacha Khan da afkaro Manawi taswerona (د باچاخان د افکارو معنوی تصویرونہ)
