= Qalandar Momand =

Pakistani writer

- Born: Sahibzada Habib-ur-Rahman Qalandar Momand; September 1, 1930
- Died: February 4, 2003 (aged 72)
- Writing career
- Language: Pashto
- Genre: poetry

Sahibzada Habib-ur-Rahman Qalandar Momand (September 1, 1930 - February 4, 2003) was a well-known Pashto poet, short story writer, journalist and linguist.

== Early life and education ==
Qalandar Momand was born on 1 September 1930 in Bazid Khel, a village near Peshawar, in what is now Khyber Pakhtunkhwa, Pakistan. He received his early education locally and later earned a degree with distinction in English Literature. A polyglot, he was fluent in Pashto, Urdu, English, Arabic, Persian, and Hindi. He also graduated with distinction in law and practised as lawyer for many years. He had also served as the principal of the Gomal Law College, Dera Ismail Khan. He had also received language diplomas in Arabic and Persian.

== Literary Contributions ==
Qalandar Momand played a pioneering role in modernizing Pashto literary expression. His work spans poetry, prose, literary criticism, linguistics, and translation. He was committed to using literature as a tool for social critique and cultural empowerment.

== Political Activism and Alignment with Bacha Khan ==
A staunch nationalist and committed writer, Qalandar Momand suffered imprisonment for his progressive views and advocacy for Pashtun rights, aligning with the non-violence philosophy of Bacha Khan. He was a close companion of Bacha Khan and stood firm against authoritarian regimes, including opposing General Ayub Khan's one-unit policy . Momand's political activism extended to his journalistic endeavors. He edited Shahbaz, the official publication of the National Awami Party (NAP), and served as editor of Anjam. His outspoken views led to multiple imprisonments, including a notable period during the Ayub Khan regime, where he witnessed the torture and death of communist leader Hasan Nasir

== Notable works ==
- Sabāʼūn (صَباوون – "Dawn") – collection of revolutionary and socially conscious poetry
- Raṇāʼī – collection of modern Pashto poetry
- Gajre – a volume of short stories depicting evolving Pashtun society
- Daryāb: Puṣhto Lughat – a comprehensive Pashto dictionary and linguistic reference
- Pashto translation of Shakespeare's Macbeth – a landmark in cross-cultural literary exchange and one of the earliest full Shakespearean works rendered into Pashto
- Paṭah khazānah fī al-mīzān, critical study of Paṭah khazānah, a Pushto work containing biographies of early Pushto poets, by Muḥammad Hotak,
- میزان a collection of essays and research articles previously published in Pushto magazines from 1950 to 2002
- Da Khayr al-Bayān tanqīdī mut̤ālaʻah, critical study of Khayr al-Bayān, a Pushto work on Islamic precepts by Pīr Roṣhān Bāyazīd Anṣārī, fl. 1526-1572
- Da Arist̤ū Naẓmīyāt tashrīḥ aw tabṣirah, commentary on Aristotle's Poetics
- Tanqīd : talkhīṣ aw tanqiyyah, on literary criticism

For the Pashto literary tradition His translations and analyses bridged classical literature with the evolving idiom of Pashto modernism.

- Da Rahman Baba Kulliyat is a compilation of the poetry of Abdul Rahman Mohmand, popularly known as Rahman Baba, edited jointly by Dost Mohammad Khan Kamil and Qalandar Momand. In this edition, Momand applied modern textual and linguistic analysis to verify, correct, and authenticate the original verses of Rahman Baba, whose manuscripts had undergone variations over time.

== Journalistic Career ==
Qalandar Momand began his journalistic in Karachi during the 1960s. He edited Shahbaz, the official publication of the National Awami Party (NAP), and also served as editor of Anjam. As a leftist intellectual and supporter of democratic resistance, he was repeatedly imprisoned for his outspoken views. He remained associated with many Pakistani and a few Bangladeshi newspapers as well

He was notably detained during the Ayub Khan regime, during which he witnessed the torture and death of the communist leader Hasan Nasir in Lahore Fort—a pivotal event that deeply influenced his political philosophy.

== Academic and Cultural Contributions ==
Momand's scholarly contributions in Pashto linguistics and literary criticism were groundbreaking. He promoted analytical and modern literary frameworks rooted in indigenous traditions. He was also a founding member of Sahu Leekunko Adabi Maraka, a Pashto literary organization established in 1962.

He served as the founding president of the Peshawar Press Club, contributing significantly to the development of Pakistan's independent media space.

== State awards ==
Pride of Performance (1979) – Awarded by the president of Pakistan for literary excellence Prime Minister's National Award for Democracy (1989) – In recognition of his commitment to democratic ideals Sitara-i-Imtiaz (1996) – One of Pakistan's highest civilian honors for his literary and academic achievements

== Other Recognitions ==
Qalandar Momand also received numerous awards from literary societies, press clubs, and cultural organizations throughout Pakistan, recognizing both his intellectual stature and his principled activism.

== Personal life ==
Qalandar Momand was the fourth of the six sons born to Sahibzada Saif ur Rahman. His brother Sahibzada Faizur Rahman Faizi was also a notable Pashto poet. His two sons Jalawan Momand,Marghalara,Zalan Momand and a daughter Durr e Nayab Sahibzada are known in social and academic circles.

== Death and legacy ==
He died on 4 February 2003. His legacy remains central to Pashto literature, progressive thought, and Pashtun identity discourse. He is revered not only as a literary figure but also as a principled public intellectual who refused to compromise on issues of justice, freedom, and cultural dignity.
