= David Neil MacKenzie =

British linguist (1926–2001)

- Born: 8 April 1926; London, England, UK
- Died: 13 October 2001 (aged 75); Bangor, Wales, UK
- Occupation: Linguist

David Neil MacKenzie FBA (8 April 1926 – 13 October 2001) was a scholar of Iranian languages.

== Biography ==
Neil MacKenzie (he never used his given first name to be distinguished with his namesake father, David) was born in London in 1926 and attended a succession of schools in Southern England. In 1943, aged 17, he enlisted in the British Army. In 1945 and 1946 he served as a soldier on the North-West Frontier Province of British India, where he learned Pashto. Thus acquainted with Iranian languages, he acquired a Bachelor's degree in New Persian and a Master's degree in Old- and Middle Persian at the School of Oriental and African Studies (SOAS) of the University of London. His PhD dissertation, Kurdish Dialect Studies (1957, published 1961–1962), established his reputation as an Iranist and linguist.

At SOAS, MacKenzie was appointed Lecturer in Kurdish in 1955, a position that was extended to include all Iranian languages in 1961. He was promoted to Reader in 1965, a post he held until 1975 when he received an appointment as Chair of Oriental Philology at the University of Göttingen in Germany.

MacKenzie retired from that position in 1994 and settled in Bangor, North Wales. Upon his return to Britain, MacKenzie was elected as a Fellow of the British Academy. David Neil MacKenzie died on 13 October 2001 in Bangor, aged 75. He was survived by three sons and one daughter.

== Academic achievements ==
Even though MacKenzie was an acknowledged authority on Kurdish and medieval Khwarezmian, he contributed significantly to the study of other Iranian languages, such as Middle Persian, Sogdian and Pashto. MacKenzie's contribution to Pashto, Gorani and Kurdish, just to name a few, is the reason for a "former colleague's" description of "poor MacKenzie" as "the man who knows all the dialects and none of the languages."

His Concise Pahlavi Dictionary (1971) was not only one of his most important works, but remains the authoritative lexicographic reference on the language of the 9th-12th century Zoroastrian texts. His Khwarezmian dictionary remained unfinished at the time of his death.

In his obituary, MacKenzie is noted to have been "a polyglot whose linguistic knowledge was remarkable in both range and depth. Generally recognised as the world's leading authority on modern Kurdish and medieval Khwarezmian, he also made distinguished contributions to the study of many other Iranian languages, including Pashto, Pahlavi and Sogdian, at the same time displaying enviable competence in non-Iranian languages such as Arabic and Chinese."

== See also ==
- Iranian Studies
- List of Iranists
