= Saadullah Jan Barq =

Pakistani Pashto poet

- سعد الله جان برق
- Born: 11 May 1940 (age 85); Dag Besood, Pabbi Nowshera
- Occupations: poet columnist analyst satirist playwright

Saadullah Jan Barq (born 11 May 1940) is a Pakistani poet, columnist, analyst and writer. Barq is fluent in Hindi, Persian, Arabic and Urdu. He began his writing career by writing for Bang-i-Haram, a local daily newspaper. He contributed editorials for Inqelab and Shahbaz. He wrote plays in both Urdu and Pashto for radio and PTV.

He authored books on Pashtun ethnography and historiography. One of these books, Yadon ke Janaze, is an autobiography. He writes daily columns for Urdu daily Express, Zair-i-lab, which are published by daily Shahbaz. He is known for his humor and satire. Barq has associated with writers such as Qalandar Momand, Dr Raj Wali Shah Khattak, Dr Yar Muhmmad Maghmum Khattak, and Abdur Rahim Majzoob.

== Literary works ==
Barq's books include:

- Braikhna
- Baraan
- Gulziarray
- Zaghoona
- Dukhtar-e-Kainaat
- Da Kashmir Ghazi
- Yaadon ke Janaze
- Pukhtoon Qaam ya Nasal
