= Hamza Shinwari =

Afghan Pashto Poet (1907–1994)

Ameer Hamza Shinwari امیر حمزہ شینواری حمزہ بابا شینواری
- Hamza BaBa
- Born: 1907; Landi Kotal, NWFP, British India (Now, Khyber Pakhtunkhwa, Pakistan)
- Died: 18 February 1994 (aged 86–87)
- Burial place: Landi Kotal, Khyber District, Khyber Pakhtunkhwa, Pakistan
- Known for: Pashto and Urdu poetry
- Notable work: Ghazawanay; Baheer; Yoon; Tazkira-e-Satariya; Tajaliyat-e-Muhammadia; Kulyaat

Amir Hamza Khan Shinwari (Pashto: اميرحمزه خان), commonly known as Hamza Baba (حمزه بابا) was a prominent Pashto poet, playwright and author. His works are studied at the Master's level at the University of Peshawar. He is considered a bridge between the classic and modern Pashto literature. He founded the Khyber School in Pashto literature. A number of notable poets of this school, such as Nazir Shinwari, Khatir Afridi, and Khyber Afridi were his pupils.

== Early life ==
Hamza was born in September 1907 at Landi Kotal, Khyber District, British India in present-day Pakistan, as the fourth of five sons in the house of Malik Bazmir Khan. The family was known for upholding the Pashtunwali code. Orphaned early in life, he was raised by an elder brother, Bawar Khan. His early experience of formal education set the pattern for the remainder of his schooling. His primary-school teacher set the six-year-old to writing out the alphabet; Hamza received rather severe punishment when he instead followed his artistic inclinations and drew human figures. The incident deterred him from attending school; from a young age he would roam the local area, returning home at the same time as his school fellows. When his long-term absence from school was noted, his brother enrolled him in the Islamia Collegiate School in Peshawar. To attend, Hamza had to board in a hostel in the city. He endured what was for him a miserable experience for as long as he could, leaving school permanently during the tenth grade.

== Career ==
As early as the fifth grade Hamza began writing poetry in Urdu; at this time there was little verse published in Pashto. When his murshid (spiritual guide), Khawaja Syed Abdul Sattar Shah, advised him to write in his mother tongue Pashto, he followed that guidance.

One reviewer commented in 2011:

Baba may not have been a first-rate Urdu poet, but once he started composing verses in Pashto, he perfected Pashto ghazal to the extent that Pashtun critics conferred on him the title, Baba-e-Pashto ghazal.

— From Dawn's Inpaper magazine (2011)

When Shinwari worked on the railways, he had very little money. He received a low-income certificate and quit. He travelled to Mumbai to work in the film industry but failed to establish himself.

Hamza's literary influences included Mirza Khan Ansari and Khushal Khan Khattak.

Hamza was also a critic and a playwright, producing 200 plays for Radio Pakistan, features, critical essays, and research papers for different literary newspapers of Pakistan.

== Influence ==
He belonged to the Shinwari tribe of the ethnic Pashtuns. His work is considered a fusion between classic and modern poetry. He wrote classical poetry, blended it with recent innovations, and introduced new ideas in Pashto ghazal. He is also known as the father of Pashto Ghazal.

== Personal life ==
Hamza lived in Landi Kotal; his home was in Muhalla Sakhi Shah Mardan. He died in February 1994 and is buried in Khyber District.

== Awards and recognition ==
- Pride of Performance award by the President of Pakistan in 1979.
- Sitara-i-Imtiaz (Star of Excellence) award by the Government of Pakistan.

== Death and legacy ==
Hamza Shinwari died on 18 February 1994.
