= Muhammad Akram Khan =

Nawab of Amb from 1877 to 1907

Nawab Akram Khan Tanoli
- Nawab Shahib; His Majesty

9th Nawab of Kingdom of Amb
- Reign: 1877 – 1907
- Successor: Muhammad Khan Zaman Khan
- Born: 7 January 1858; Kashmir, British India
- Died: 12 September 1907; Amb, British India
- Burial: 1907; Darband, Khyber Pakhtunkhwa
- Wife: A daughter of Ibrahim Khan
- Issue: Fifteen sons
Names
- Nawab Sir Muhammad Akram Khan Tanoli
- Dynasty: Tanoli
- Father: Mir Jehandad Khan
- Religion: Sunni Islam
- Military career
- Allegiance: British Rule
- Rank: Nawab

Nawab Sir Muhammad Akram Khan GCIE KCSI KCVO was the ruler of the Indian princely state of Amb from 1877 until his death in 1907. Son of Jehandad Khan, he was only nine years old when his father died. People of that time thought that Maddad Khan Tanoli, the ruling Khan of Phulra, might assert a claim as ruler but no such event occurred at that time.

He built the fort at Shergarh, as well as those at Dogah and Shahkot. His rule was a peaceful time for Tanawal, with no major conflicts. As well as being appointed a knight commander of the Order of the Star of India, he also received from the British Crown the title of Nawab Bahadur and this title was eventually granted to his descendants in perpetuity.

The Imperial Gazetteer of India reported that in 1901 Amb had an area of 214 square miles and a population of 31,622.

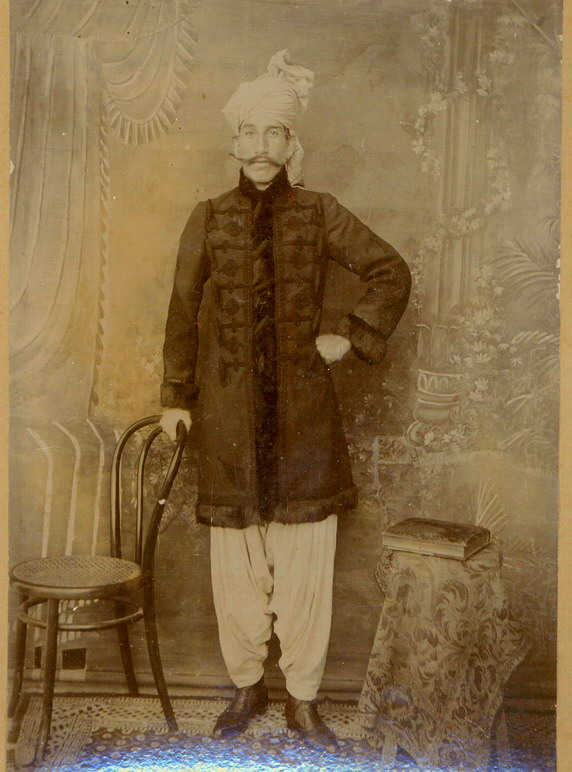
Mohammad Ismail Khan, son of Mohammad Akram Khan, at the Delhi Durbar, 1911

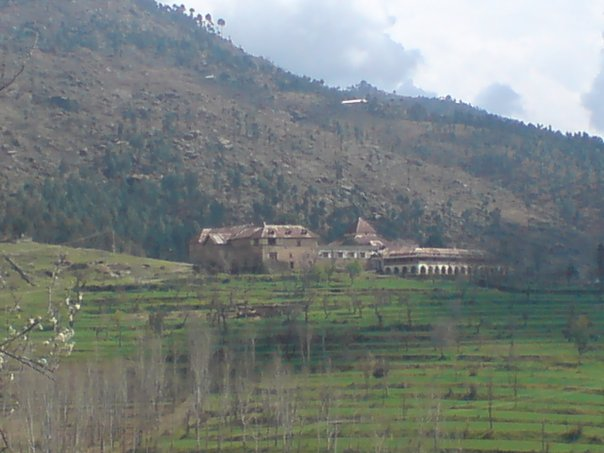
Shergarh, the summer residence of the Nawab of Amb

Muhammad Akram Khan had fifteen sons, and when he died, his oldest son Khan Zaman Khan succeeded him. He should not be confused with Muhammad Akram Khan (1817–1852), one of the sons of Dost Mohammad Khan, Emir of Afghanistan.
