= Princely states of Pakistan =

Territories incorporated into Pakistan from 1947 to 1974

The Princely States of Pakistan (Urdu: پاکستان کی نوابی ریاستیں) were princely states of British India which acceded to the new Dominion of Pakistan in 1947 and 1948, following the partition of British India and its independence.

At the time of the withdrawal of British forces from the subcontinent on 15 August 1947, West Pakistan was less than half of its ultimate size. The princely states were incorporated following a year of negotiations and interventions.

== Options of the Princes ==
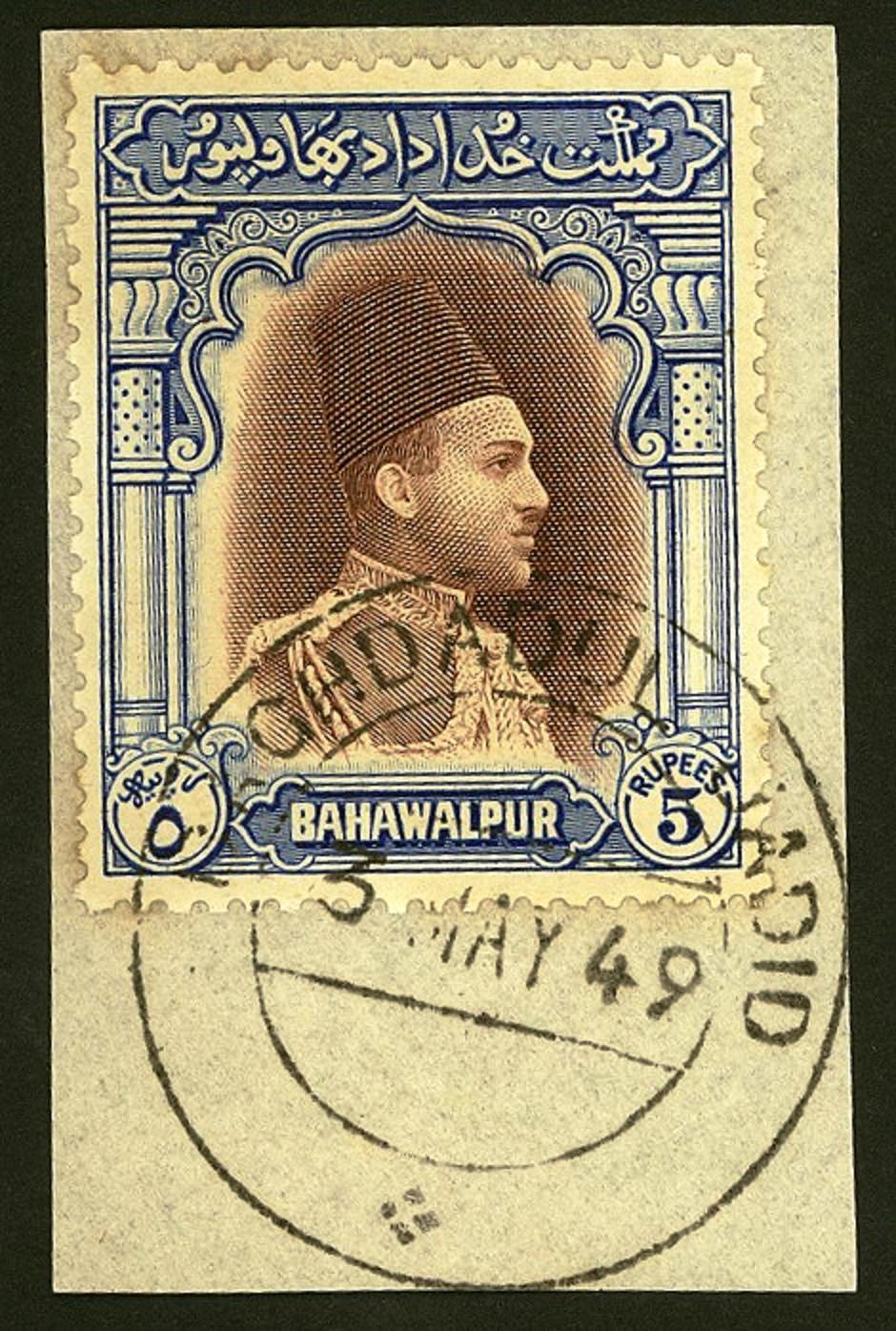
Stamp of Sadiq Mohammad Khan V, Amir of Bahawalpur, as used in 1949

With the withdrawal of the British from the Indian subcontinent, in 1947, the Indian Independence Act provided that the hundreds of princely states which had existed alongside but outside British India were released from all their subsidiary alliances and other treaty obligations to the British, while at the same time the British withdrew from their treaty obligations to defend the states and keep the peace. The rulers were left to decide whether to accede to one of the newly independent states of India or Pakistan (both formed initially from the British possessions) or to remain independent outside both. As stated by Sardar Patel at a press conference in January 1948, "As you are all aware, on the lapse of Paramountcy every Indian State became a separate independent entity."

Only two rulers acceded to Pakistan in the first month of its independence, August 1947, while the others considered what to do, but most of those states with a Muslim majority population had acceded to Pakistan within a year, prompted in several cases by the Indo-Pakistani War of 1947.

The Instruments of Accession made available for the rulers to sign transferred only limited powers to the Dominion of Pakistan, namely external relations, defence, and communications; in most cases signing was believed to leave the states in the position they had under the suzerainty of the British Crown. The Wali of Swat commented that the states' accession "did not change very much". However, within a generation all of the princely states had lost their internal autonomy. The last to be annexed were Hunza and Nagar, in October 1974.

== Princely states ==
Following princely states ultimately acceded to and became part of Pakistan:

Name	Agency	Capital	Coat of arms	Flag	Map
Bahawalpur بہاولپور	Punjab States Agency	Bahawalpur بہاولپور			
Khairpur خیرپور	Punjab States Agency	Khairpur خیرپور	None		
Kalat قلات	Baluchistan Agency	Kalat قلات	None		
Las Bela لسبیلہ	Baluchistan Agency	Bela بیلہ	None		
Kharan خاران	Baluchistan Agency	Kharan خاران	None		
Makran مکران	Baluchistan Agency	Kech کیچ	None		
Phulra پھلرا	Hazara Tribal Agency	Amb امب	None	None	
Amb امب	Hazara Tribal Agency	Shergard شیر گڑھ			
Swat سوات	Malakand Agency	Saidu Sharif سیدو شریف	None		
Dir دیر	Malakand Agency	Dir دیر	None		
Chitral چترال	Malakand Agency	Buni بونی			
Hunza ہنزہ	Gilgit Agency	Baltit بلتیت			
Nagar نگر	Gilgit Agency	Nagarkhas نگر خاص			

== Accession of Junagadh and Bantva Manavadar ==
The princely state of Junagadh, a coastal state on the Kathiawar peninsula, had a mostly Hindu population but a Muslim ruler, Muhammad Mahabat Khan III, and in August 1947, he decided to accede to Pakistan, the first ruler of a state to do so. The Nawab's dewan, Shah Nawaz Bhutto, delivered the Instrument of Accession to Jinnah in person, and on 13 September Jinnah accepted the accession. However, some of the Hindu subjects from the majority of the population revolted, and seeking to force the Nawab of Junagadh to change his decision, India imposed a blockade on the state. On 8 November, after giving up on all hope of assistance from Pakistan, Bhutto asked the Indian government to take over the administration of the state as a temporary measure to restore order. This arrangement was pending a final settlement through negotiations and did not mean that Junagadh had acceded to India. The Government of India installed a governor and arranged a referendum on the status of the state, which took place on 20 February 1948 and voted overwhelmingly for union with India. This led to the integration of Junagadh into India. India maintained that it had not invaded Junagadh, but had taken it over only after the Nawab's government had completely collapsed.

Ghulam Moinuddin Khanji, Khan of Bantva Manavadar, a subordinate or vassal state of Junagadh, also signed an accession to Pakistan on 24 September 1947. The Indian police invaded Manavadar on 22 October, and the Khan was arrested. Following a plebiscite, the state was merged with the newly federated state of Saurashtra on 20 February 1949. The Khan was released as a result of the Liaquat–Nehru Pact of 8 April 1950. He lived in Karachi from 1951, where he continued to be recognized as a prince. He became president of the Pakistan Hockey Federation and died in 2003.

== Princely states in order of accession ==
=== Bahawalpur ===
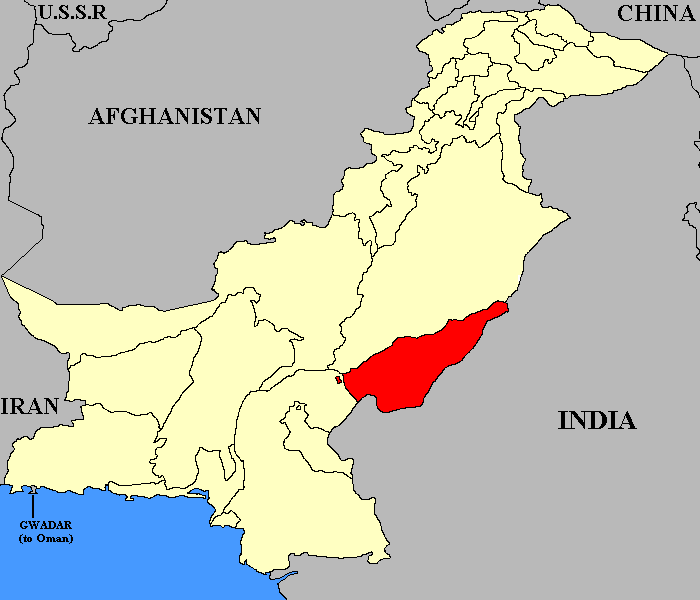
Bahawalpur

On 3 October 1947, after some delay, the Nawab (or Ameer) of Bahawalpur, Sir Sadiq Mohammad Khan V, acceded his state to Pakistan, becoming the first ruler to do so successfully. As tens of thousands of Muslim refugees flooded into the state from the new Dominion of India, the Ameer of Bahawalpur Refugee Relief and Rehabilitation Fund was instituted to provide for their relief. In 1953, the Ameer of Bahawalpur represented Pakistan at the coronation of Queen Elizabeth II. In 1955, he signed an agreement with the Governor-General of Pakistan, Sir Malik Ghulam Muhammad, under which Bahawalpur became part of the province of West Pakistan, with effect from 14 October 1955, and the Ameer received a yearly privy purse of 32 lakhs of rupees (equivalent to £291,984 in 2026), keeping his titles.

=== Khairpur ===
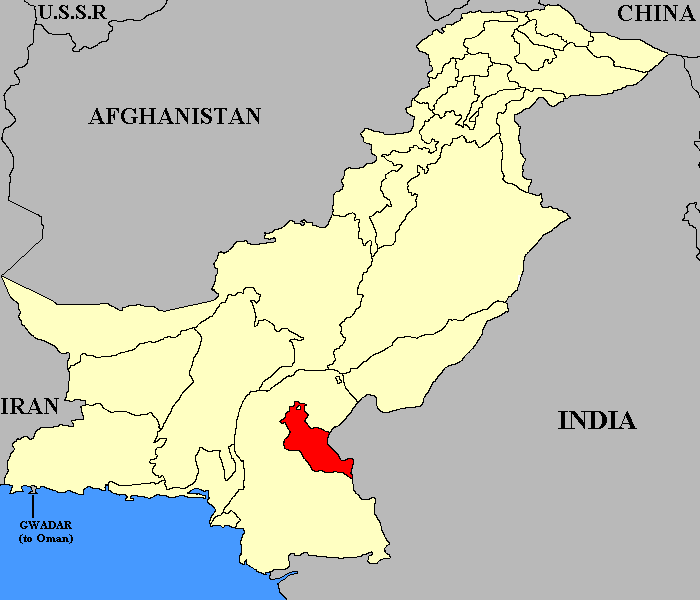
Khairpur

The state of Khairpur also acceded to Pakistan on 3 October 1947. George Ali Murad Khan (born 1934), who from 19 July 1947 to 14 October 1955 was the last Amir (or Nawab) of Khairpur, was a minor for much of his reign, so it was a Regent, Mir Ghulam Hussain Khan Talpur, who acceded to Pakistan on his behalf.

In 1950, the Amir introduced a form of democracy, with universal adult franchise. In 1955, the state was integrated into West Pakistan. The royal privileges of the Amir were abolished in 1972.

As of 2015, the last Amir, George Ali Murad Khan, was one of the few surviving princes. As of late 2025, he was the last one; he passed away in 2026.

=== Chitral ===
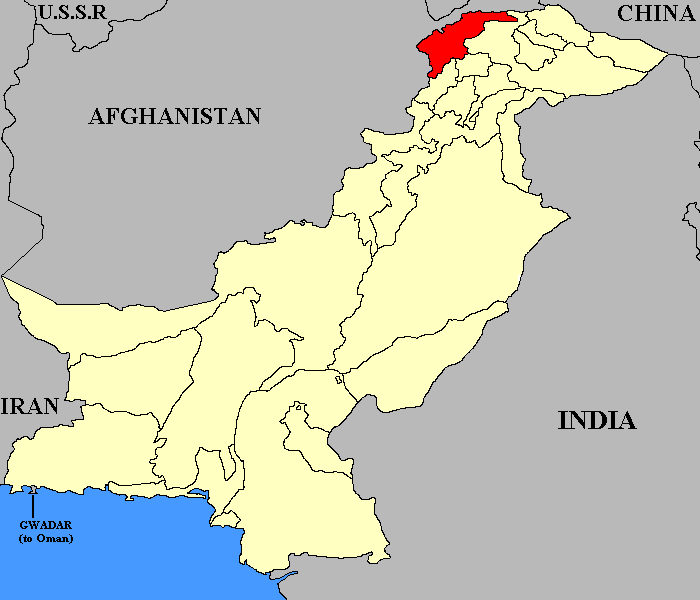
Chitral

The Mehtar of Chitral, Muzaffar-ul-Mulk (1901–1949), stated his intention to accede to Pakistan on 15 August 1947. However, his formal accession was delayed until 6 October. He died in January 1949. His son, Saif-ur-Rahman (1926–1954), had been exiled by the Government of Pakistan and a board of administration composed of Chitrali noblemen was to govern the state in his absence. In October 1954, Saif-ur-Rahman was allowed to return from exile to take charge of Chitral, but he died in a plane crash on the way home, leaving his four-year-old son Mohammad Saif-ul-Mulk Nasir (1950–2011) as ruler. His uncle, Shahzada Asad ur-Rahman, acted as regent until he came of age and was invested with full powers as Mehtar at Chitral Fort in May 1966.

On 28 July 1969, President Yahya Khan announced the full integration of the states of Chitral, Dir, and Swat into Pakistan, and the dispossessed young ruler, then aged nineteen, agreed to take up a diplomatic career. He joined the Foreign Service in 1973 and served as First Secretary at Ankara, 1974–1979, as Deputy Chief of Protocol in the Ministry of Foreign Affairs, 1979–1985, and as Assistant Consul-General in Hong Kong, 1985–1989.

=== Swat ===
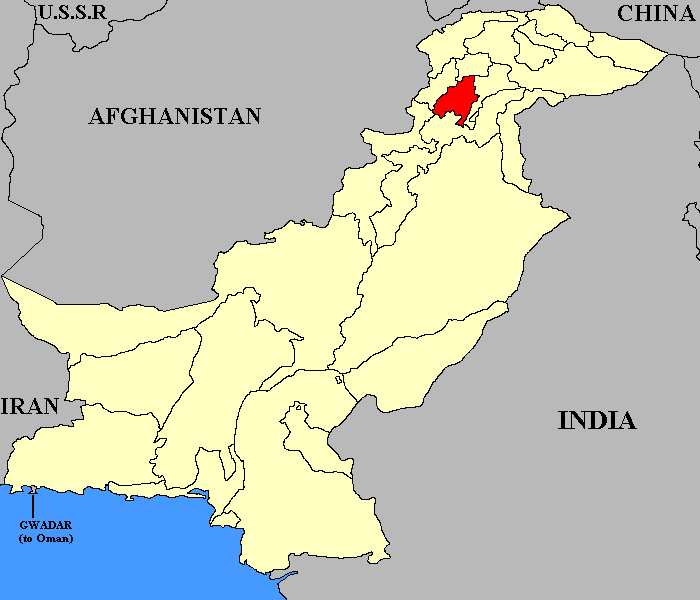
Swat

The Wāli of Swat, Miangul Abdul Wadud, acceded his state to Pakistan on 3 November 1947. The last Wali, Miangul Jahan Zeb (1908–1987), continued to exercise absolute rule until Pakistan took control, when on 28 July 1969 Yahya Khan announced the full integration of the states of Swat, Chitral, and Dir into Pakistan.

=== Hunza ===
Hunza was a small princely state to the north of Jammu and Kashmir, and had been subject to the suzerainty of the Maharaja of Jammu and Kashmir since 1891. In 1931, its population was reported as 13,241. Having once been under Chinese protection, after the departure of the British from the subcontinent in August 1947, Hunza received approaches from the Republic of China, which wished the Mir to return to Chinese protection. However, on 3 November 1947, the Mir of Hunza, Mohammad Jamal Khan (1912-1976), who had been ruler only since 1946, sent a telegram to Jinnah stating that he wished to accede his state to the Dominion of Pakistan. This action came one week after the decision by Sir Hari Singh, Maharajah of Kashmir, to accede to India, following the invasion by Pashtun Mehsud tribals, backed by Pakistani paramilitary forces, in October 1947 under the code name "Operation Gulmarg" to seize Kashmir. On 27 October, Indian Army troops had moved into Kashmir. Hunza's formal accession took place on 18 November. On 25 September 1973, following local protests, the Mir's rule came to an end when Zulfikar Ali Bhutto, Prime Minister of Pakistan, abolished the Mir's government and annexed the state to the Northern Areas of Pakistan, under the federal government. Two years after his forced abdication, the Mir died.

=== Nagar ===
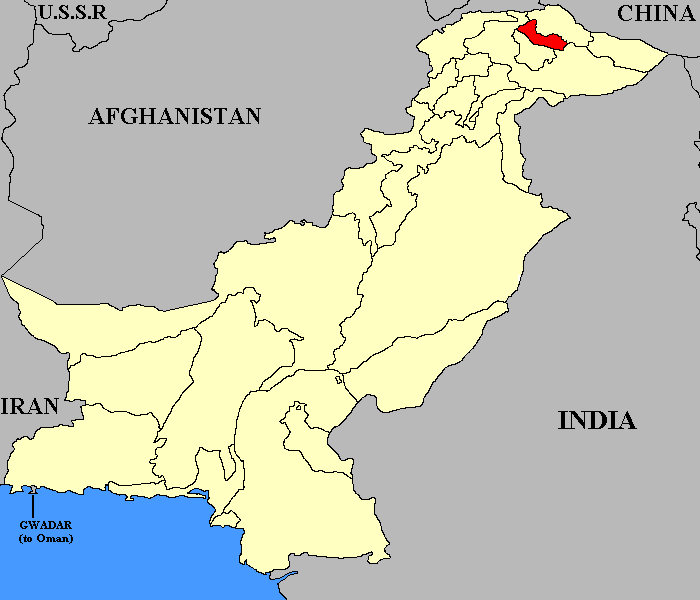
Nagar

Nagar was another small valley state to the north of Kashmir and shared the language and culture of Hunza. In 1931 it had a population of 13,672, much the same as that of Hunza. On 18 November 1947, its ruler, Shaukat Ali Khan (1917–2003), who had come to the throne in 1940, joined his neighbour in acceding to Pakistan.

In 1968, Syed Yahya Shah, a politician of the valley, demanded civil rights from the Mir of Nagar. On 25 September 1973, not long after the Pakistan People's Party under Zulfiqar Ali Bhutto had come to power, the new government forced the last Mir of Nagar, Brigadier Shaukat Ali Khan, to abdicate his power, as with the Mir of Hunza, and like Hunza, Nagar was merged into the Northern Areas, although the Mir of Nagar was left with some of his purely ceremonial role.

=== Amb ===
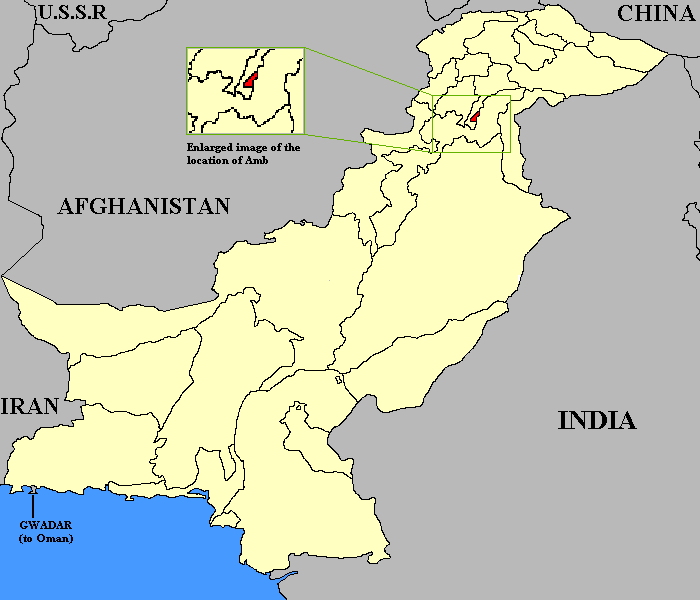
Amb

On 31 December 1947, Muhammad Farid Khan, Nawab of Amb, acceded to Pakistan. Amb continued to be an autonomous state within Pakistan until 1969, when following the death of the Nawab it was incorporated into the North West Frontier Province (now known as Khyber-Pakhtunkhwa). In 1971, recognition of the royal status of the Nawabs by the Government of Pakistan came to an end.

A small state, in 1958 Amb was reported to have an area of 1,520 square kilometres (585 square miles) and a population of 48,656.

=== Phulra ===
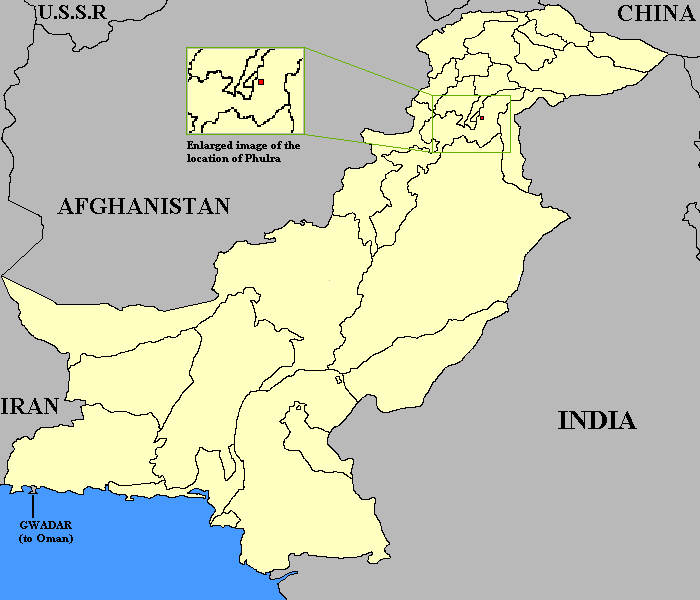
Phulra

Phulra was a khanate near Amb, with a population of about 8,000 and an area of only 93 square kilometres (36 square miles). Almost all of its people lived in ninety-eight villages. Its last Khan, Nawab Abdul Latif Khan, concurred with the Nawab of Amb's accession to Pakistan. In 1949, the khanate came to an end when it was merged into the North West Frontier Province.

=== Dir ===
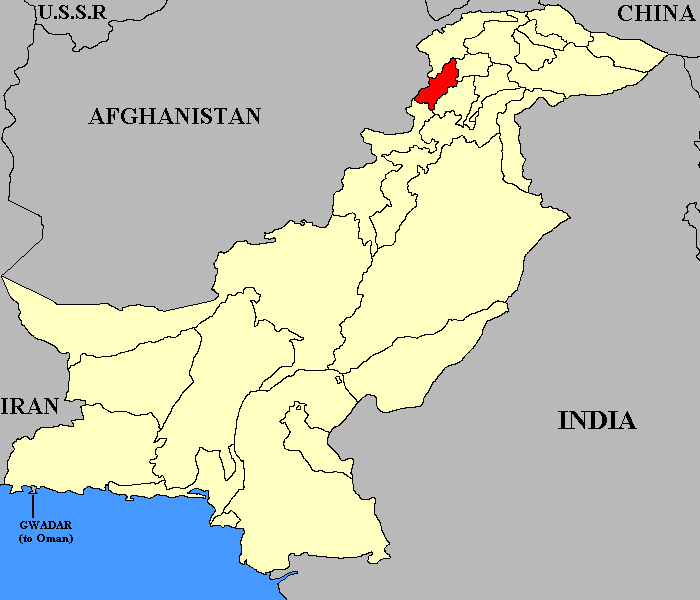
Dir

The Nawab of Dir, Sir Nawab Shah Jahan Khan, sent troops to support Pakistan in the First Kashmir War of 1947, and he signed an instrument of accession to Pakistan on 8 November. But it was not until 8 February 1948 that the state's accession was accepted by Jinnah as Governor-General. In 1961, Yahya Khan exiled Jahan Khan and replaced him as Nawab with his son Mohammad Shah Khosru Khan, who was a Major General in the Pakistan Army, but the real control passed to the state's political agent. On 28 July 1969, Yahya Khan announced that the states of Dir, Chitral, and Swat were being incorporated into Pakistan.

=== Lasbela ===
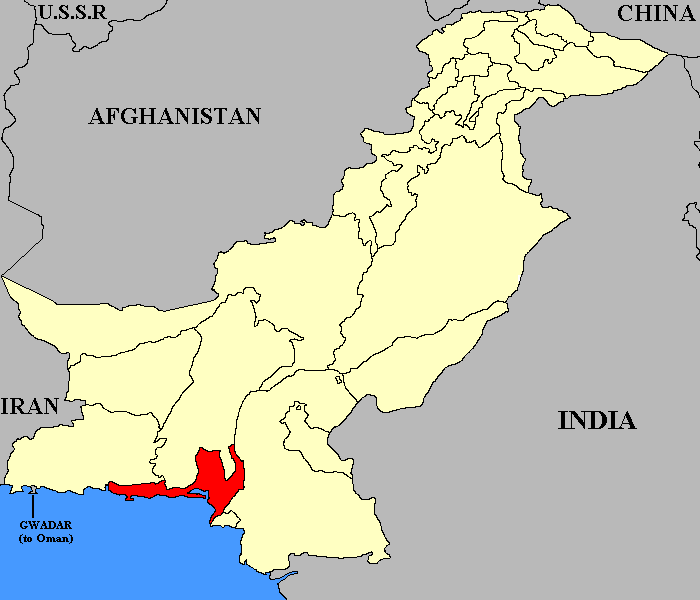
Lasbela

Lasbela's ruler Jam Ghulam Qadir Khan (1920–1988) acceded to Pakistan on 7 March 1948, and the accession was accepted by Pakistan on 17 March. The state was a member of the Baluchistan States Union from 3 October 1952 to 14 October 1955, but it retained its internal autonomy. That came to an end in 1955, when Lasbela was incorporated into the new West Pakistan province and became part of the Kalat division. In 1962, Lasbela was detached from West Pakistan and merged with the Federal Capital Territory to form Karachi-Bela. In 1970, it became the Lasbela District of the new province of Balochistan.

=== Kharan ===
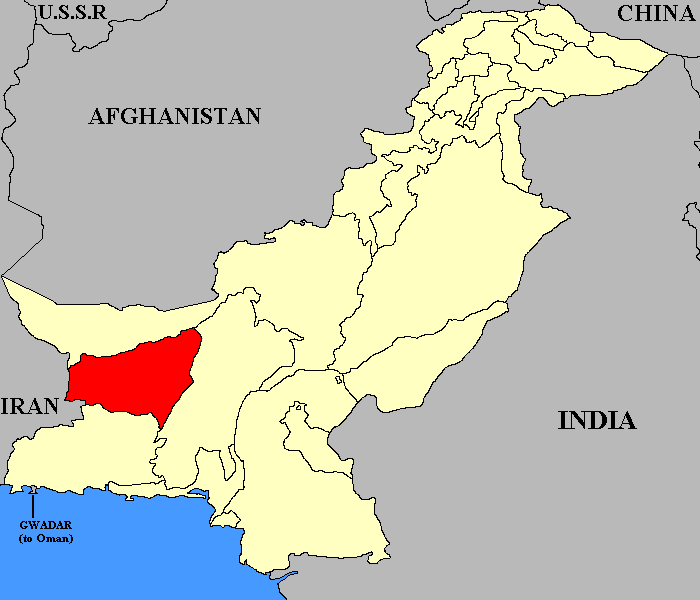
Kharan

With an area of 47,940 square kilometres (18,508 square miles) and a population reported in 1951 as 33,833, Kharan was one of the princely states of Balochistan which retained some degree of their independence for several years. Its last Nawab was Habibullah Khan Nausherwani (1897–1958), who was in power from 1911 until 1955.

The state acceded to Pakistan on 17 March 1948, which was accepted on the same day. On 21 March 1948, the rulers of Kharan, Makran, and Lasbela all announced that they were acceding their states to the Dominion of Pakistan.

=== Makran ===
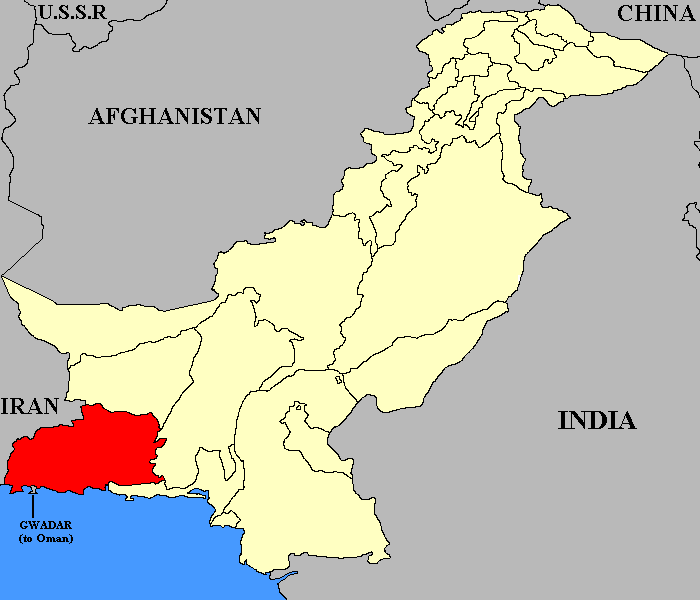
Makran

Also on 17 March 1948, Makran acceded to Pakistan, and on 3 October 1952, it formed the Baluchistan States Union with Kalat, Kharan and Lasbela. Makran was dissolved on 14 October 1955, when it was merged into the province of West Pakistan. In 1970, the area of the former state was organized as the Makran District (later the Makran Division) of the province of Baluchistan.

=== Khanate of Kalat ===
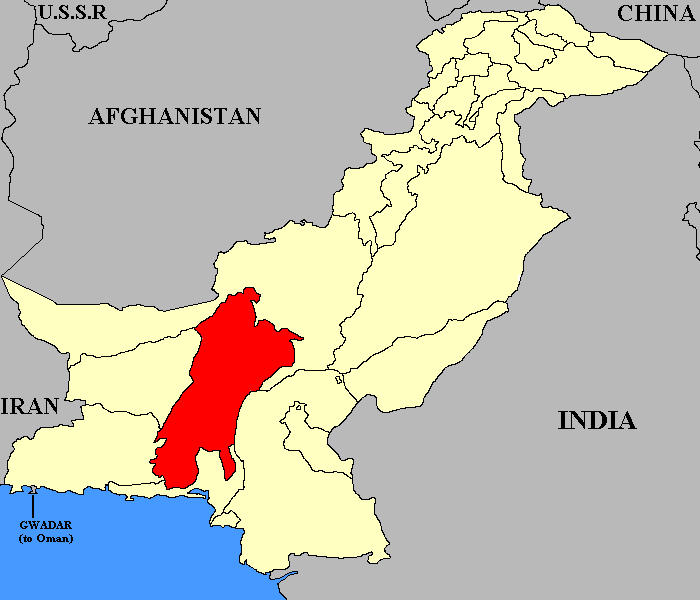
Kalat

The Khanate of Kalat, which covered the substantial area of 139,850 km^{2} (53,995 sq mi), was reported in 1951 to have a population of 253,305. It remained fully independent from 15 August 1947 until 27 March 1948, when its ruler, Ahmad Yar Khan (1904–1979), finally acceded to Pakistan. On 3 October 1952, the state of Kalat entered into the Baluchistan States Union with three neighbouring states, Kharan, Lasbela, and Makran, with the Khan of Kalat at the head of the Union with the title of Khan-e-Azam. The khanate came to an end on 14 October 1955, when it was incorporated into West Pakistan.

On 20 June 1958, Mir Sir Ahmad Yar Khan Ahmedzai, the Khan of Kalat, declared the Baluchistan revolt. On 6 October 1958, the Balochistan police captured the Kalat Palace and arrested the Khan for sedition. The next day, Iskandar Mirza declared martial law, which led to disturbances in Balochistan lasting about a year. The Khan was eventually forgiven and released.

== See also ==
- Administrative units of Pakistan
- Former administrative units of Pakistan
- Divisions of Pakistan
- One Unit Scheme
- West Pakistan

== Bibliography ==
- Martin Axmann (2008), Back to the Future: The Khanate of Kalat and the Genesis of Baloch Nationalism, 1915–1955, Oxford University Press, ISBN 978-0-19-547645-3
- Bangash, Yaqoob Khan (2015), A Princely Affair: The Accession and Integration of the Princely States of Pakistan, 1947–1955, Oxford University Press, USA, ISBN 978-0-19-906649-0
- Bangash, Y. K. (2015), "Constructing the state: Constitutional integration of the princely states of Pakistan", in Roger D. Long; Gurharpal Singh; Yunas Samad; Ian Talbot (eds.), State and Nation-Building in Pakistan: Beyond Islam and Security, Routledge, pp. 76–100, ISBN 978-1-317-44820-4
- Behera, Navnita Chadha (2007), Demystifying Kashmir, Pearson Education India, ISBN 978-8131708460
- Copland, Ian (February 1991), "The Princely States, the Muslim League, and the Partition of India in 1947", The International History Review, 13 (1): 38–69, doi:10.1080/07075332.1991.9640572, JSTOR 40106322
- Copland, Ian (2005), State, Community and Neighbourhood in Princely India, c. 1900–1950, Palgrave Macmillan, ISBN 0230005985
- Siddiqi, Farhan Hanif (2012). The Politics of Ethnicity in Pakistan: The Baloch, Sindhi and Mohajir Ethnic Movements. Routledge. ISBN 978-1-136-33697-3.
- Wilcox, Wayne Ayres (1963), Pakistan: The Consolidation of a Nation, Columbia University Press, ISBN 978-0-231-02589-8
