= List of capitals in Pakistan =

This is a list of capital cities of Pakistan and its current and former provinces, territories, and states.

== National capital ==
Islamabad officially became the capital of Pakistan on 14 August 1967, exactly 20 years after the country's independence. The first capital of Pakistan was the coastal city of Karachi in Sindh, which was selected by Muhammad Ali Jinnah. Karachi was and still is the largest city and economic capital of Pakistan. It remained the seat of government until 1959, when the military president, Ayub Khan, decided to build a new capital, Islamabad in the north of Pakistan, near the general headquarters of the Pakistani Armed Forces which is in Rawalpindi. During this process, Rawalpindi was the interim capital. It is believed the name of Islamabad was influenced from the Mughal name of the Bengali port city of Chittagong which was Islamabad.

In 1962, Ayub Nagar was made the legislative capital of the country due to East Pakistan's high population.

The reasons for relocating the capital from Karachi are that it would reflect the diversity of the Pakistani people, it would be separated from the business and commercial activity of Karachi, and also it would be easily accessible from all parts of the country. The move to Islamabad was not completed until the late 1960s and for some years several government ministries were based in nearby Rawalpindi.

== Regional capitals ==
Location of Capitals

The capitals of the provinces and territories of Pakistan have remained the same since the 1970s when the current administrative structure was established. All four provincial capitals are the largest cities of their respective provinces. Pakistan has a total population of 207,774,520 according to the 2017 census estimate.

Subdivision	Status	Capital	Population (1998 census)	Population (2017 estimate)
Balochistan	Province	Quetta	565,137	12,335,129
Islamabad Capital Territory	Federal Territory	Islamabad	529,180	2,003,368
Khyber Pakhtunkhwa	Province	Peshawar	3,690,135	31,349,742
Punjab	Province	Lahore	5,143,495	91,379,615
Sindh	Province	Karachi	9,339,023	55,245,497

== Former regional capitals ==
- Baluchistan (Chief Commissioner's Province) (1947–1955): Quetta
- East Bengal / East Pakistan (1947–1971): Dacca
- Federally Administered Tribal Areas (1947-2018): Miranshah/Parachinar
- Federal Capital Territory (1947–1960): no specific capital but theoretically Saddar, Karachi
- West Pakistan (1955–1970): Lahore

Princely states

- Amb (princely state) (1947–1969): Amb
  - Phulra (1947–1950): no specific capital but theoretically Amb
- Bahawalpur (princely state) (1947–1955): Bahawalpur city
- Baluchistan States Union (1952–1955): Kalat city
  - Khanate of Kalat (1947–1955): Kalat city
  - Kharan (princely state) (1947–1955): Kharan city
  - Las Bela (princely state) (1947–1955): Bela
  - Makran (princely state) (1947–1955): Turbat
- Chitral (princely state) (1947–1972): Chitral city
- Dir (princely state) (1947–1969): Dir (city)
- Gilgit Agency (1947–1974): Gilgit
  - Hunza (princely state) (1947–1974): Baltit
  - Nagar (princely state) (1947–1974): Nagarkhas
- Junagadh State (1947–1948): Junagadh city
- Khairpur (princely state) (1947–1955): Khairpur city
- Swat (princely state) (1947–1969): Saidu Sharif

== See also ==
- List of historical national capitals
- List of countries with multiple capitals
- Administrative units of Pakistan
- Former administrative units of Pakistan
