= Revolt of Painda Khan =

1843–1844 revolt in the Hazara region

Painda Khan's revolt
- Part of Sikh rule in Hazara
Date	September 1843 – September 1844
Location	Hazara district, Darband, Amb, and nearby areas east and west of the Indus
Result	Sikh victory (Note: "A number of rebellions took place during the ministry of Hira Singh, but all of them failed."): Several forts seized by Sikh forces; Mir Jehandad Khan submitted

Belligerents
Sikh Empire	Amb

Commanders and leaders
Diwan Mulraj Dilwalwala; General Dhaunkal Singh; Colonel Cortlandt	Mir Painda Khan X Mir Jehandad Khan (surrendered); Sher Muhammad Khan of Gandgarh; Arsila Khan of Zaidah; Sultan Najaf Khan of Khatur; Ali Gauhar of Khanpur; Habibullah Khan of Pakhli; Sayyids of Kaghan

The Revolt of Painda Khan or the Rebellion in the Hazara District was a insurrection against the Sikh authority in the Hazara region led by Painda Khan of Darband between 1843 and 1844. Hazara, situated east of the Indus and distant from Lahore, remained a difficult frontier region for the Sikh Empire despite Sikh possession of Attock and its surrounding territory since 1813.

After the death of Fateh Khan of Panjtar in 1840, Painda Khan succeeded to the leadership of the local opposition to Sikh rule. He was supported by several local chiefs. In 1844, Sikh forces defeated Painda Khan and recovered several forts. Later that year, General Dhaunkal Singh arranged for Painda Khan to be poisoned through his physician. Painda Khan's son then submitted and requested a jagir.

== Background ==
The Hazara district lay east of the Indus and far from Lahore, making it a difficult region for the Sikh administration to control. Although Attock and nearby territory had been held by the Sikhs since 1813, the Yusafzai clan of Hazara did not accept Sikh authority. Fateh Khan of Panjtar was the earliest major organiser of resistance in the area and later supported Syed Ahmad's Holy War between 1827 and 1831.

Ranjit Singh attempted to conciliate Fateh Khan by offering him a jagir of three lakhs in return for nominal submission, represented by an annual tribute of a hawk and a horse. Fateh Khan did not accept the proposal. After his death in 1840, Painda Khan of Darband became the leading figure in the opposition to the Lahore government in Hazara.

Painda Khan belonged to Darband, located on the eastern bank of the Indus. He later established himself at Amb, on the western bank of the river, in a small tract protected by the Indus and nearby hills. He maintained around 1,000 paid soldiers and was followed by several thousand members of his tribe. His activities included raids into Pakhli, Dhamtaur, Chach, Hazara, and Naushahra, and it is noted that Sikh and Hindu captives were held for ransom.

== Hazarewal Revolt of 1843-1844 ==
In September 1843, Diwan Mulraj Dilwalwala succeeded Arbel Singh as Governor of Hazara district. He was assisted by General Dhaunkal Singh.At this time, Painda Khan had become active with the support of the Sayyids of Kaghan, Sher Muhammad Khan of Gandgarh, Arsila Khan of Zaidah, Sultan Najaf Khan of Khatur, Ali Gauhar of Khanpur, Habibullah Khan of Pakhli, and the Chhibali tribes.

Mulraj and Dhaunkal Singh worked together in the administration of Hazara and succeeded in extending Sikh authority in the district.Their position, however, was weakened by Raja Gulab Singh, who was at odds with the Sikh Empire.

By 1843, Sikh authority in Hazara remained contested despite earlier attempts to secure the district. Painda Khan of Darband had emerged as the principal leader of opposition after the death of Fateh Khan of Panjtar in 1840. His resistance drew support from several local chiefs and groups, including the Sayyids of Kaghan, Sher Muhammad Khan of Gandgarh, Arsila Khan of Zaidah, Sultan Najaf Khan of Khatur, Ali Gauhar of Khanpur, Habibullah Khan of Pakhli, and the Chhibali tribes.

Fighting continued into 1844. Intelligence from February 1844 recorded petitions from Colonel Courtland reporting action against Painda Khan, including one engagement in which casualties occurred on both sides. A further skirmish was also reported, during which Painda Khan was said to be in communication with Wazir Akbar Khan. Later in 1844, Sikh forces defeated Painda Khan and captured several forts from him.

In September 1844, Painda Khan fell ill. General Dhaunkal Singh bribed the physician treating him, resulting in Painda Khan being poisoned to death.

== Aftermath ==
After his death, Painda Khan's son submitted and requested a jagir. The submission did not fully settle the district, which remained disturbed due to the continuing intrigues of Raja Gulab Singh.

== Sources ==
- Shashi, Shyam Singh, ed. (1996). Encyclopaedia Indica: Princely States in Colonial India-I. Encyclopaedia Indica: India, Pakistan, Bangladesh. Vol. 167. Anmol Publications. ISBN 8170418593.
- Gupta, Hari Ram, ed. (1975). Panjab on the Eve of First Sikh War: A Documentary Study of the Political, Social, and Economic Conditions of the Panjab as Depicted in the Daily Letters Written Chiefly from Lahore by British Intelligencers During the Period from 30 December 1843 to 31 October 1844 (2nd revised ed.). Publication Bureau, Panjab University. ISBN 0883866536.
- Gupta, Hari Ram (1978). History of the Sikhs: The Sikh Lion of Lahore, Maharaja Ranjit Singh, 1799–1839. Vol. 5 (3rd illustrated ed.). Munshiram Manoharlal. ISBN 8121505151.
- McClenaghan, Tony (1996). Indian Princely Medals: A Record of the Orders, Decorations, and Medals of the Indian Princely States (illustrated ed.). Lancer Publishers. ISBN 1897829191.
- Gupta, Hari Ram, ed. (1958). Sir Jadunath Sarkar Commemoration Volumes: Essays Presented to Sir Jadunath Sarkar. Vol. 2. Department of History, Panjab University.
