= Maddad Khan Tanoli =

- Jagirdar; Jagir or Zamindar; Feudal Landlord

Shared De-Facto Ruler by his brother of State of Amb
- Born: 12 July 1809; Amb, Amb State
- Died: 6 October 1888; Darband, Khyber Pakhtunkhwa
- Burial: Darband, Khyber Pakhtunkhwa
- Issue: Abdullah Khan Tanoli.; Arsla Khan Tanoli.; Hussain Khan Tanoli.; Ameer Khan Tanoli.; Unknown
- Dynasty: Tanoli
- Father: Mir Nawab Khan Tanoli
- Religion: Sunni Islam
- Military career
- Conflicts: Battle of Nowshera * Second Anglo-Sikh War

Maddad Khan Tanoli (1809-1888) was the younger brother of Mir Painda Khan. He played a considerable part in fighting the Sikh Empire with Painda Khan, who gave Maddad Khan land as Jagirdar.

One of his descendants Atta Muhammad Khan Tanoli who was the grandson of Abdullah Khan Tanoli created a princely state named Phulra in 1919. One of his grandson Safiullah Khan Tanoli, who was the son of Hussain Khan Tanoli, was a minister in Amb state with Nawab Khan zaman Khan Tanoli and later his successor Muhammad Farid Khan Tanoli.
