= Suba Khan Tanoli =

Tanoli chieftain (1736–1783)

- Sultan Zabardust Khan Tanoli

4th Nawab of Tanawal
- Reign: 8 August 1755 – 8 November 1783
- Predecessor: Khan Muhammad Bahadur Khan Tanoli
- Successor: Mir Haibat Khan Tanoli
- Born: 1 May 1736; Amb
- Died: 2 November 1783 (aged 47); Haripur
- Burial: 1783; Tomb of Sultan Suba Khan (Mouzou Phohar Ilaqa Sherwan), Haripur, Pakistan
- Issue: 12 sons
Names
- Qaisar-e-Sultan Padishah-e-Nizam Nawab Zabardast Khan Bahadurkhani
- Hereditary Dynasty: Tanoli
- Father: Khan Muhammad Bahadur Khan Tanoli
- Religion: Sunni Islam
- Military career
- Allegiance: Durrani Empire; Mughal Empire
- Rank: Nawab
- Conflicts: Indian campaign of Ahmad Shah Durrani

Khan Zabardast Khan Tanoli (1 May 1736 – 2 November 1783), better known as Sultan Suba Khan Tanoli, was the Chieftain of the Tanoli Tribe and the absolute monarch of Mulk Tanol and Governor of Kashmir Province in 18th-century Mughal India.. He was one of the very few most powerful monarchs in the Region at that time. The King of Afghanistan Ahmad Shah Abdali awarded him the title of Sultan Suba, Absolute Authority over Kabul to Kashmir Trade Route, Jagir as a minor gift in Kashmir while the Mughal Empire granted him the title of Amir-al-umara. His territory included Pakhli, Kashmir, Amritsar, Bharatpur and Peshawar. He fought at the Third Battle of Panipat on the side of Ahmed Shah Abdali and contributed to the Afghan victory with rifles and zamburak artillery. He played a considerable part in campaign of Ahmad Shah Abdali against the Sikh and Hindu Jats.

Original Illustration of Khan Zabardast Khan Tanoli son of Khan Bahadur khan by Jean-Baptiste Lamarck in 1774.

He managed the area during a period of conflict. Records state that he focused on maintaining local peace and assisting the population. He also implemented measures to regulate the prices of food and other resources.

Interestingly according to Regional Traditional History The Bherkund, Mangal and Bir was Settled or Upgraded by Sultan Suba Khan Tanoli. Moreover Akhund Saad-ud-din Khan of Agror conquered Agror with the help of Sultan Suba Khan Tanoli.

Khan Zabardast Khan's influence and his power created a territorial conflicts between later Afghan and Tanoli rulers.

Sultan Suba Khan Tanoli passed away around 1783. After his death, the next ruler was Mir Haibat Khan Tanoli who was Wazir-e-Azam and Maternal First cousin of Himself. Khan Haibat Khan, was the grandfather of the great Regional Aggressive Warlord and Chieftain of his Hind-āl Clan Painda Khan Tanoli and father of Mir Nawab Khan Tanoli.
