= Lassan Thakral =

Coordinates: 34°16′N 73°04′E

- Village and union council
- Interactive map of Lassan Thakral
- Country: Pakistan
- Region: Khyber-Pakhtunkhwa
- District: Mansehra District

Government
- Time zone: UTC+5 (PST)
- Area code: 0997

Lassan Thakral is a village and union council (an administrative subdivision) of Mansehra District in Khyber-Pakhtunkhwa province of Pakistan. It is located in the south of Mansehra district where it borders Abbottabad District.

== Demographics ==
The main and the largest tribe of Lassan Thakral is Tanoli tribe from Ghilji confederation.
