= Lassan Nawab =

- Town and union council
- Interactive map of Lassan Nawab
- Country: Pakistan
- Region: Khyber-Pakhtunkhwa
- District: Mansehra District

Government
  - MNA: Shahzada Muhammad Gushtasap Khan
  - MPA: Zahid Chanzeb
  - Tehsil Mayor: Sheikh Muhammad Shafi
- Time zone: UTC+5 (PST)
- Postal code: 21390

Lassan Nawab (لساں نواب) is a town situated in a long and narrow valley about 32 kilometers from Mansehra city. Lassan Nawab town is also a union council (an administrative subdivision) of Mansehra District in Khyber-Pakhtunkhwa province of Pakistan.

== Demographics ==
The main language spoken in Lassan Nawab is Hindko. The main tribe living in Lassan Nawab is the Tanoli tribe. By ethnicity they describes themselves as a non pashto speaker pashtuns.

It is located in the south of the district and borders Haripur and Abbottabad districts.

Formerly it was a part of the Princely State of Amb.
