= Muhammad Farid Khan =

Final Nawab of Amb

Muhammad Farid Khan Tanoli
- Nawab; Nawab Shahib

11th and last Nawab of the Kingdom of Amb
- Reign: 1936–1969
- Born: 1 January 1904; Amb, Indian Empire
- Died: 28 July 1969; Darband, Khyber Pakhtunkhwa
- Burial: 1969; Darband, Khyber Pakhtunkhwa
Names
- Nawab Sir Khan Bahadur Muhammad Farid Khan Tanoli
- Dynasty: Tanoli
- Father: Muhammad Khan Zaman Khan
- Religion: Sunni Islam
- Military career
- Allegiance: Indian Empire, Pakistan
- Rank: Nawab
- Conflicts: Indo-Pakistani War of 1947–1948, Indo-Pakistani War of 1965

Seated left to right at Darband, Amb, in 1949, Sahibzada Mohammad Khurshid, Nawabzada Liaquat Ali Khan, first Prime Minister of Pakistan, and his wife Begum Ra'ana Liaquat Ali Khan, thanking Nawab Sir Muhammad Farid Khan Tanoli of Amb (Tanawal) for his help in the Indo-Pakistani War of 1947–1948

Nawab Sir Muhammad Farid Khan Tanoli KBE was the last ruling Nawab of the princely state of Amb, from 1936 till 1969. He was appointed a Knight Commander of the Order of the British Empire (KBE) in the 1946 New Year Honours list. His state was in a subsidiary alliance with British India until August 1947, and in December of that year the Nawab acceded to Pakistan. In 1958, Amb was reported to have an area of 590 square miles and a population of 48,656. He faced several rebellions from his own clan, which led to the state crumbling into more than twelve khanates of his clan.

== After 1947 ==
After the Partition of British India (which did not include Amb), leading to the independence of Pakistan in 1947, Amb became fully independent, and remained so for the rest of 1947, but on 31 December the Nawab acceded his state to Pakistan.

Nawab Farid khan Tanoli's contributions to the Pakistan movement were acknowledged by the Quaid e Azam.
