= Mir Nawab Khan Tanoli =

Nawab Khan Tanoli
- Nawab; Dewan of Hazara

6th Dewan of Hazara and Kashmir of Kingdom of Amb
- Reign: 1810–1818
- Successor: Mir Painda Khan
- Born: 12 April 1792; Amb
- Died: 13 October 1818; Peshawar
- Burial: 1818; Darband, Khyber Pakhtunkhwa
- Issue: Maddad Khan Tanoli, Mir Painda Khan
Names
- Nawab Khan Tanoli
- Dynasty: Tanoli
- Father: Sardar Haibat Khan Tanoli
- Religion: Sunni Islam
- Military career
- Conflicts: Stratagem of Peshawar (Jamrud Fort 1818); War campaign against Durrani and Sikh Empire

Sultan Nawab Khan Tanoli was the ruler of the Tanawal valley and the Chief of the Hazara region from circa 1810 until he died in 1818. During his rule, he faced many attacks from the Sikh Empire, Durrani Empire, and French East-India Company (Louis XIV's East India Company), resulting in a significant loss of territory. He was 26 years old when he was assassinated by Azim Khan Barakzai the younger brother of King Dost Mohammad Khan on October 13, 1818 in the Stratagem of Peshawar.

The main reason for the war is that Mir Nawab Khan who defied Durrani and other main reason was that when Azim Khan's mother was traveling to Kashmir via Tanwal, Nawab Khan's soldier collected the tax. Azim Khan then travelled through Tanwal and then Nawab Khan's soldiers collected taxes through Azim Khan. After Azim Khan felt ashamed and was admitted to the Afghan court then the Afghans Ruler of that time sent their army. He was hostile to all neighbouring kingdoms and was always ready for war and wanted to keep every king at his feet.

After the ascension of his son, Painda Khan, and Maddad Khan, a series of rebellions erupted against the Sikh and Durrani dominions, enduring throughout their lifetimes. In response to these challenges, Maharaja Ranjit Singh dispatched Hari Singh Nalwa as the governor of Hazara. Under his leadership, Nalwa oversaw the construction of numerous strategically positioned forts to quell the Tanoli military resistance.

The Sikh rule over Hazara eventually met its conclusion in 1846, following the end of the First Anglo-Sikh War.

== See also ==
- Tanoli
- Sikh Empire
- Durrani
- Amb (princely state)
