= Mir Jehandad Khan =

Mir Jahandad Khan Tanoli
- Nawab of State of Amb; Nawab Shahib; Nizam-ul-Mulk

Nawab of Amb
- Reign: 1844 – 1868
- Predecessor: Mir Painda Khan
- Successor: Muhammad Akram Khan
- Born: 6 February 1820; Amb, Amb
- Died: 11 July 1868; Darband, Khyber Pakhtunkhwa
- Burial: 1868; Darband, Khyber Pakhtunkhwa
Names
- Khan Bahadur Jahandad Khan Tanoli
- Dynasty: Tanoli
- Father: Mir Painda Khan
- Religion: Sunni Islam
- Military career
- Allegiance: British Rule
- Rank: Nawab
- Conflicts: Second Anglo-Sikh War, Conflict war with Sikh Empire

Nawab Jahandad Khan Tanoli was a chief of Tanoli tribe in the Hazara region of the North-West Frontier of British India and Nawab of Amb. Jahandad Khan Tanoli was the son of Mir Painda Khan, a fighter against the Sikh Empire. He became the ruler of Amb on the death of his father in 1844.

== Life ==
Though a man of less enery and vigour than his father, Jahandad Khan continued the struggle against the Sikhs. He stormed the Sikh forts in 1846 but saved the Sikh garrisons in his country. For this, Diwan Hari Chand confirmed his old jagir, adding that of Kulai and Badnak. It was said, "Of all the tribal chiefs of Hazara, the most powerful [was] said to be Jahandad Khan of the Tanoli." His territories lay on both banks of the Indus, and Jahandad Khan was highly respected among his peoples as the son of Painda Khan.

In the words of Major J. Abbott

"His (Jahandad's) territory interposes between Hazara and the strongest and most troublesome of the independent tribes. He can send 50 or 60 matchlocks to retaliate a fray which might cost us an army of 8000 men. Jahandad Khan is naturally of a gentle and sincere temperament, and has fewer vicious propensities than most Asiatics."

As far as Jahandad Khan's domain of Upper Tanawal is concerned, with its capital at Amb, the term jagir has never been applicable to it. The British Government considered "Upper Tannowul" as a chiefship held under the British Government, but as a rule they did not possess internal jurisdiction within it. The Chief managed his own people in his own way, without regard to the laws, rules or systems of British India. This tenure resembled that of the Chiefs of Patiala, Jhind, Nabha, Kapurthala, and others.

In 1852, Jahandad Khan was ordered by the President of the Board of Administration, who was visiting Hazara to see him at Haripur about the murder of two British officers, Carne and Tapp of the Salt Department, who had been killed in the country of Jahandad Khan in 1851. When the President ordered the Khan to give up the murderers or else suffer the consequences, the Khan is reported to have replied "We should consider your presence in our kingdom an honour, but our country is a rather difficult one for your army." However, for all his public bravado, the Khan recognised his limitations and in private protested his innocence to the British administrators, and was eventually cleared of the charges. In due course, Jahandad Khan was granted the personal and temporary title of 'Nawab', which in succeeding generations was to be granted to the family in perpetuity.

When he died, Jehandad's nine-year-old son, Muhammad Akram Khan, succeeded him.

== Sources ==
- Allen, Charles (2001). Soldier Sahibs: the men who made the North-West Frontier. Abacus. ISBN 0349114560.
