= List of members of the 4th Provincial Assembly of North West Frontier Province =

The Pakistani North-West Frontier Province, now known as the province of Khyber Pakhtunkhwa, after its reinstatement in 1970, was governed by a legislative body known as the Provincial Assembly. Members were elected from 42 constituencies.

Serial No.	Name of members	Constituency
01	Hayat Muhammad Khan Sherpao	PF - 1, Peshawar - 1
02	Arbab Jehangir Khan	PF - 2, Peshawar - 2
03	Arbab Sikandar Khan Khalil	PF - 3, Peshawar - 3
04	Arbab Saif ur Rehman Khan	PF - 4, Peshawar - 4
05	Khan Abdul Wali Khan (vacated seat) Sher Dil Khan	PF - 5, Peshawar - 5
06	Muhammad Akram Khan	PF - 6, Peshawar - 6
07	Haji Taj Muhammad Khan	PF - 7, Peshawar - 7
08	Wali Muhammad Khan	PF - 8, Peshawar - 8
09	Saad Ullah Khan	PF - 9, Hazara - 1
10	Muhammad Zarin Khan	PF - 10, Hazara - 2
11	Haq Nawaz Khan	PF - 11, Hazara - 3
12	Muhammad Haroon Khan Badshah	PF - 12, Hazara - 4
13	Syed Muzamil Shah	PF - 13, Hazara - 5
14	Muhammad Iqbal Khan Jadoon	PF - 14, Hazara - 6
15	Sardar Gul Zaman Khan	PF - 15, Hazara - 7
16	George Sikandar Zaman Khan Raja	PF - 16, Hazara - 8
17	Muhammad Nawaz Khan	PF - 17, Hazara - 9
18	Abdul Samad Khan	PF - 18, Mardan - 1
19	Muhammad Akram Khan	PF - 19, Mardan - 2
20	Khan Amirzadah Khan	PF - 20, Mardan - 3
21	Main Ghulam Jilani	PF - 21, Mardan - 4
22	Abdul Aziz Khan	PF - 22, Mardan -5
23	Abdul Mastaan Khan	PF - 23, Mardan cum-Hazara
24	Nawabzada Azmat Ali Khan	PF - 24, Kohat - 1
25	Maulana Habib Gul	PF - 25, Kohat - 2
26	Mohsin Ali Khan	PF - 26, Kohat - 3
27	Sardar Inayatullah Khan Gandapur	PF - 27, Dera Ismail Khan - 1
28	Makhdoom Atta ur Rehman Shah	PF - 28, Dera Ismail Khan - 2
29	Humayun Saif Ullah Khan	PF - 29, D.I.Khan cum-Bannu
30	Maulvi Muhammad Yaqub Khan	PF - 30, Bannu - 1
31	Abdul Samad Khan	PF - 31, Bannu - 2
32	Qadir Nawaz Khan	PF - 32, Chitral
33	Muhammad Hanif Khan	PF - 33, Malakand (Protected Area)
34	Muhammad Abdul Rauf Khan	PF - 34, Swat - 1
35	Maulana Abdul Baqi	PF - 35, Swat - 2
36	Afzal Khan Lala	PF - 36, Swat - 3
37	Muhammad Rehman Khan	PF - 37, Swat - 4
38	Rehman Ullah Khan	PF - 38, Dir cum-Swat
39	Muhammad Yaqub Khan	PF - 39, Dir - 1
40	Aman Ullah Khan	PF - 40, Dir - 2
41	Mrs.Kalsoom Saif Ullah Khan	PF - 41, Women's Constituency - 1
42	Mrs.Mahmooda Salim Khan	PF - 42, Women's Constituency - 2

== See also ==
Khyber Pakhtunkhwa Assembly
