= Former administrative units of Pakistan =

Former administrative units of Pakistan پاکستان کی سابقہ انتظامی اکائیاں পাকিস্তানের প্রাক্তন প্রশাসনিক বিভাগসমূহ
- Subdivision of Pakistan
- 14 August 1947–1975
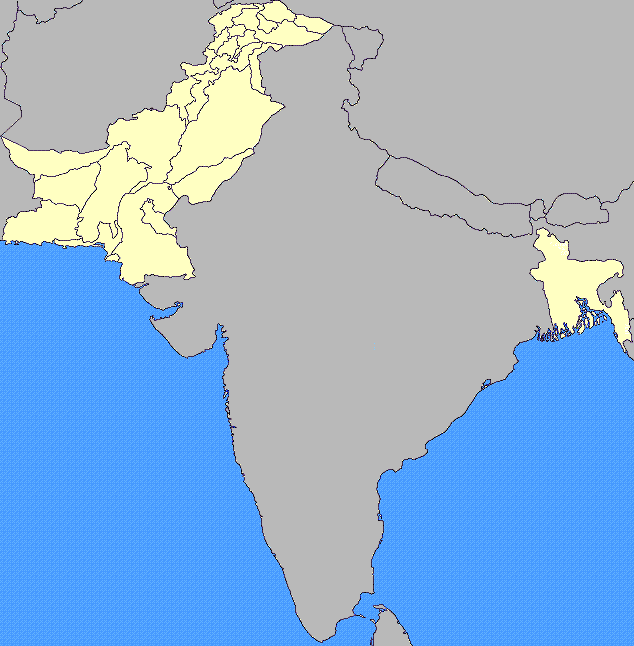
- Map of Pakistan with Former administrative units of Pakistan highlighted
- Capital: Karachi; Islamabad
- Area
- 947,940 km^{2} (366,000 sq mi)
- History
  - Established: 14 August 1947
  - Disestablished: 1975

The former administrative units of Pakistan are states, provinces, and territories which mainly existed between 1947 and 1975 when the current provinces and territories were established. The former units have no administrative function today, but some remain as historical and cultural legacies. In some cases, the current provinces and territories correspond to the former units – for example the province of Punjab includes almost all the territory of the former province of West Punjab.

== At independence ==
=== Provinces ===
Name	Capital	Emblem	Flag	Map
East Bengal مشرقی بنگال পূর্ব বাংলা	Dacca ڈھاکہ ঢাকা		None	
West Punjab مغربی پنجاب পশ্চিম পাঞ্জাব	Lahore لاہور লাহোর			
Sind سندھ সিন্ধু	Hyderabad حیدر آباد হায়দ্রাবাদ			
North-West Frontier شمال مغربی سرحدی صوبہ উত্তর-পশ্চিম সীমান্ত	Peshawar پشاور পেশাওয়ার			
Baluchistan بلوچستان বেলুচিস্তান	Quetta کوئٹہ কোয়েটা			

=== Federal Capital Territory ===
Name	Capital	Emblem	Flag	Map
Federal Capital Territory وفاقی دارالحکومت যুক্তরাষ্ট্রীয় রাজধানী এলাকা	Karachi کراچی করাচী	Emblem of Federal Capital Territory	Flag of Federal Capital Territory	Federal Capital Territory

=== Princely States ===
Between August 1947 and March 1948, the rulers of the following princely states (which had existed alongside but outside British India) acceded their states to Pakistan, giving up control of their external affairs, while all retaining internal self-government, at least to begin with. This was lost by stages, until by 1974 all of the states had been fully integrated into Pakistan.

Name	Agency	Capital	Coat of arms	Flag	Map
Bahawalpur بہاولپور	Punjab States Agency	Bahawalpur بہاولپور			
Khairpur خیرپور	Punjab States Agency	Khairpur خیرپور	None		
Kalat قلات	Baluchistan Agency	Kalat قلات	None		
Las Bela لسبیلہ	Baluchistan Agency	Bela بیلہ	None		
Kharan خاران	Baluchistan Agency	Kharan خاران	None		
Makran مکران	Baluchistan Agency	Kech کیچ	None		
Phulra پھلرا	Hazara Tribal Agency	Amb امب	None	None	
Amb امب	Hazara Tribal Agency	Shergard شیر گڑھ			
Swat سوات	Malakand Agency	Saidu Sharif سیدو شریف	None		
Dir دیر	Malakand Agency	Dir دیر	None		
Chitral چترال	Malakand Agency	Buni بونی			
Hunza ہنزہ	Gilgit Agency	Baltit بلتیت			
Nagar نگر	Gilgit Agency	Nagarkhas نگر خاص			

== After independence ==
The origins of most of the former administrative units lay in the set-up inherited from British India. From 1947 to 1971, newly independent Pakistan comprised two "wings" – 1600 kilometres apart and separated by India. The eastern wing comprised the single province of East Bengal, which included the Sylhet District from the former British Indian province of Assam as well as the Buddhist-majority Chittagong Hill Tracts awarded by the Radcliffe Commission. The politically dominant western wing united three Governor's provinces (North-West Frontier Province (NWFP), West Punjab and Sind), and one Chief Commissioner's Province (Baluchistan), also included were thirteen princely states and parts of Kashmir.

In 1948, the area around Karachi was separated from Sind province to form the Federal Capital Territory. In 1950 the North-West Frontier Province was expanded to include the small states of Amb and Phulra and the name of West Punjab province was changed to Punjab. The Baluchistan States Union was formed in 1952 by the four princely states of southwest Pakistan. Thus, between 1947 and 1955, Pakistan comprised five provinces and one territory.

The western wing eventually included thirteen princely states, one union of states, Gwadar enclave, Gilgit agency and parts of Kashmir:

- Gilgit Agency (former agency of Kashmir – after independence on 1 November 1947, using flag of Muslim League)
- Azad Jammu and Kashmir (after Kashmir War 1947~48 - using newly AJK Flag )
- Baluchistan States Union (combining Kalat, Kharan, Las Bela and Makran in 1953 – using flag of Kalat)
- Gwadar Enclave (purchased from Sultanate of Oman in 1958)

== One Unit of Pakistan 1955 ==
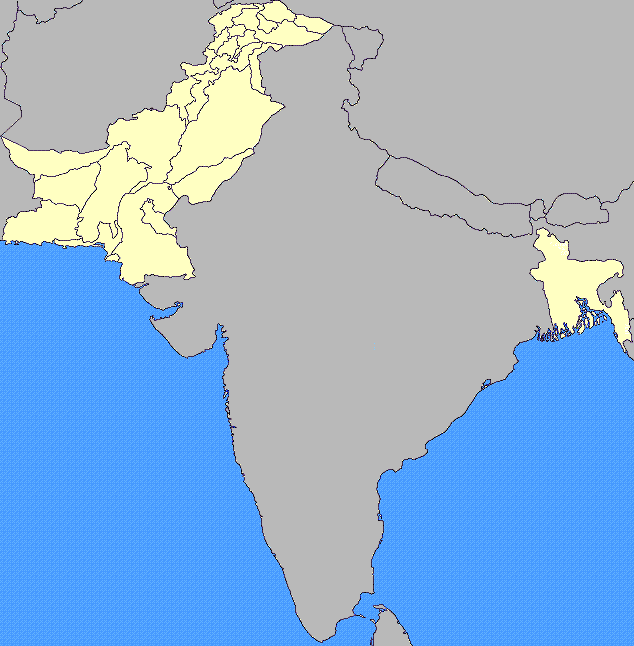
Map of one unit of Pakistan in 1955

Simmering tensions between the eastern and western wings of Pakistan led to the One Unit policy announced by Prime Minister Muhammad Ali Bogra. The states and provinces of the western wing merged in 1955 to become divisions of the new province of West Pakistan with the provincial capital at Lahore. At the same time, East Bengal became the new province of East Pakistan with the provincial capital at Dacca. West Pakistan annexed the former Omani enclave of Gwadar (on the Balochistan coast) in 1958 as part of Kalat division. In 1960 the federal government moved from Karachi to Rawalpindi (the provisional capital pending the completion of Islamabad), whilst the federal legislature moved to Dacca. The Federal Capital Territory was merged with West Pakistan in 1961 to form the new division of Karachi. In 1963 the Trans-Karakoram Tract was transferred by treaty from Gilgit Agency to China under the provision that the settlement was subject to the final solution of the Kashmir dispute. Thus from 1955 to 1970, Pakistan comprised two provinces:

Name	Capital	Emblem	Map
East Pakistan مشرقی پاکستان পূর্ব পাকিস্তান	Dacca ڈھاکہ ঢাকা		
West Pakistan مغربى پاکستان পশ্চিম পাকিস্তান	Lahore لاہور লাহোর		

== New provinces of Pakistan 1970 ==
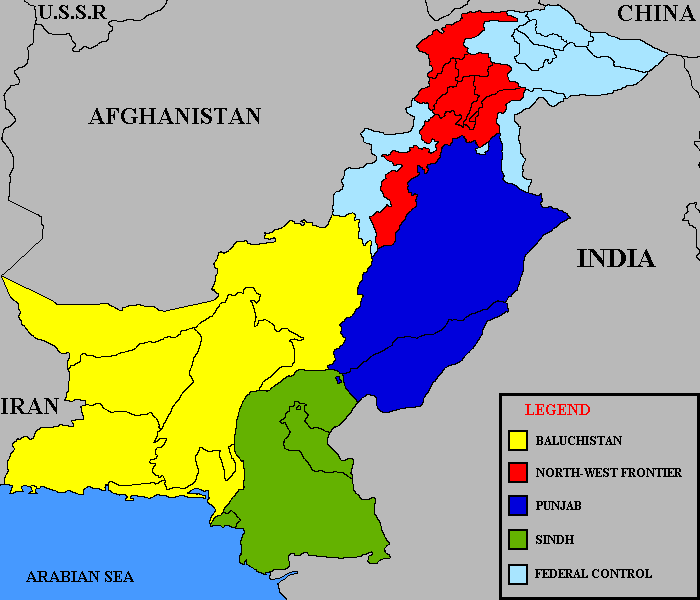
Map of new provinces of Pakistan in 1970

The One Unit policy was regarded as a rational administrative reform to reduce expenditure and eliminate provincial prejudices. However the military coup of 1958 signalled troubled times for the two-province system as the office of Chief Minister of West Pakistan was abolished by President Ayub Khan to be replaced by Governor's rule. Eventually, in 1970, the province of West Pakistan was dissolved by President Yahya Khan and four new provinces were created along with some changes in Pakistani Kashmir. These provinces combined most of the former provinces and states as follows:

New Province	Constituent former administrative units
Baluchistan Province	Baluchistan Chief Commissioner's Province; Baluchistan States Union (Las Bela, Makran, Kharan & Kalat); Enclave of Gwadar
North-West Frontier Province	Former North-West Frontier Province; State of Phulra; State of Amb; State of Swat; State of Dir; State of Chitral
Punjab Province	Former West Punjab Province; State of Bahawalpur
Sind Province	Former Sind Province; State of Khairpur; Former Federal Capital Territory
Federally Administered Area	906 km^{2} of former West Punjab Province
Northern Areas	Gilgit Agency
Azad Kashmir	Azad Kashmir

== Changes after 1970 ==
The province of East Pakistan became independent on 16 December 1971, as the new country of Bangladesh. The states of Hunza and Nagar were abolished and their territories merged into the Northern Areas in 1974. The Federally Administered Tribal Areas were formed from parts of the North West Frontier Province districts of Peshawar and Dera Ismail Khan in 1975.

The status of the Islamabad area was changed to a capital territory in 1981. The names of two provinces were slightly modified in 1990 – Baluchistan became Balochistan and Sind became Sindh. In 2009, the Northern Areas changed its name to Gilgit–Baltistan. In 2010, the North West Frontier Province changed its name to Khyber Pakhtunkhwa. 8 Years later in May 2018, the Federally Administered Tribal Areas merged with Khyber Pakhtunkhwa.

== See also ==
- Junagadh State - Acceded to Pakistan
- Hyderabad State - Supported by Pakistan
- Administrative units of Pakistan
- Politics of Pakistan
- Divisions of Pakistan
- Jammu and Kashmir (Princely State)
