= Administrative units of Pakistan =

- Category: Federated state
- Location: Pakistan
- Created: 1 July 1970
- Number: 4 provinces; 2 administrative territories; 1 federal territory
- Populations: Least, most: 1,249,000 (Gilgit–Baltistan); 110,012,442 (Punjab)
- Areas: Smallest, largest: 906.0 km^{2} (349.81 sq mi), Islamabad Capital Territory; 347,200 km^{2} (134,050 sq mi), Balochistan
- Government: Descending order: 1. National government; 2. Provincial governments; 3. District governments; 4. Tehsil Municipal Administration; 5. Local governments
- Subdivisions: Descending order: 1. Divisions; 2. Districts; 3. Tehsils; 4. Union councils

Pakistan is administratively divided into four provinces, one federal territory, and two disputed territories: the provinces of Punjab, Sindh, Khyber Pakhtunkhwa, and Balochistan; the Islamabad Capital Territory; and the administrative territories (Note: Proclaimed as autonomous by the Government of Pakistan.) of Azad Jammu and Kashmir and Gilgit–Baltistan. (Note: In November 2020, erstwhile Pakistani prime minister Imran Khan announced that Gilgit–Baltistan would attain "provisional provincial status" after the 2020 assembly election.) As part of the Kashmir conflict with neighbouring India, Pakistan has also claimed sovereignty over the Indian-controlled territories of Jammu and Kashmir and Ladakh since the First Kashmir War of 1947–1948. It also has a territorial dispute with India over Junagadh, but has never exercised administrative authority over either regions. All of Pakistan's provinces and territories are subdivided into divisions, which are further subdivided into districts, and then tehsils, which are again further subdivided into union councils.

== History ==
=== Post-independence ===
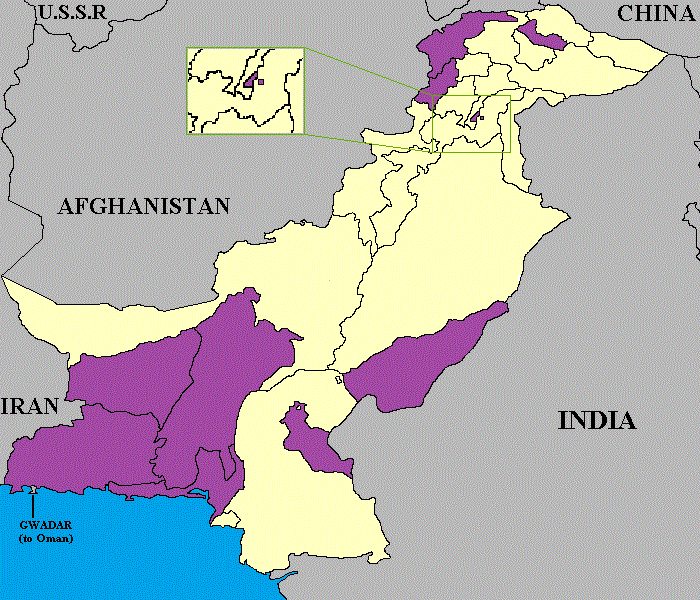
West Pakistan (pale yellow) as it was at the time of independence, with the independent princely states of 1947 in purple

Pakistan inherited the territory comprising its current provinces from India following the Partition of India on 14 August 1947. Two days after independence, the Muslim-majority Murshidabad district in Bengal was moved out of the Dominion of Pakistan and put within the Dominion of India due to a boundary adjustment by the Radcliffe Commission which was aimed at keeping the Hooghly River entirely within India. At its inception, Pakistan consisted of two wings, which were separated from each other by around 1,600 kilometres (990 mi) of Indian territory. The western wing consisted of a merger of the North-West Frontier Province, West Punjab, Sind Province, and Baluchistan CCP. The eastern wing consisted of East Bengal. What later became the Princely states of Pakistan chose at first to remain independent.

In 1948, Karachi was separated from Sind Province to form the Federal Capital Territory. In 1950, the North-West Frontier Province absorbed the princely states of Amb and Phulra while West Punjab (designated 'West' to distinguish it from India's Punjab in the east) was renamed to simply Punjab. In 1952, the four princely states in the southwest formed the Baluchistan States Union.

In 1955, the One Unit policy was launched by then-Prime Minister Muhammad Ali Bogra, whereby all the provinces and princely states of the western wing were merged to form the provincial wing of West Pakistan, with Lahore serving as its provincial capital. Simultaneously, East Bengal was redesignated as East Pakistan, with Dacca serving as its provincial capital. The One Unit policy aimed to reduce expenditure and to eliminate provincial prejudices, but the military coup of 1958 brought difficulties when the first military President, Ayub Khan, abolished the office of the Chief Minister of West Pakistan in favour of Governor rule.

On 7 September 1958, after four years of negotiations (including six months of intense negotiations), Pakistan purchased the enclave of Gwadar from Oman for ₨.5.5 billion (US$3 million; approximately $22,410,311.42 in 2017). Gwadar formally became a part of Pakistan on 8 December 1958, ending 174 years of Omani rule. In 1960, the federal capital was moved from Karachi to Rawalpindi and in 1961, the Federal Capital Territory was also merged into West Pakistan. In 1966, the capital was again moved to the newly constructed city of Islamabad. In 1962, Dacca was made the legislative capital of the country due to East Pakistan's high population. Following the 1963 Sino–Pakistan Agreement, a part of the Gilgit Agency (controlled by Pakistan since the First Kashmir War) was formally relinquished by Pakistan to the People's Republic of China (the Trans-Karakoram Tract/Shaksgam Valley in northeastern Kashmir) with the provision that the settlement was subject to the final solution of the Kashmir dispute between India and Pakistan.

=== Since 1970 ===
In 1970, the second military President, Yahya Khan, abolished the political structure of West Pakistan and established four new provinces: Sindh, Punjab, Balochistan and the North-West Frontier Province. In 1971, the Bengali-majority wing of East Pakistan seceded from the Pakistani union following the Bangladesh Liberation War, consequently forming the independent People's Republic of Bangladesh. In 1974, the remaining princely states of Hunza and Nagar were abolished and their territories merged into the Gilgit Agency, following which the Northern Areas were formed. In 1975, portions of the districts of Peshawar and Dera Ismail Khan were separated to form the Federally Administered Tribal Areas. In 1981, the region surrounding Islamabad was separated from Punjab province, and renamed to the Islamabad Capital Territory.

In August 2000, divisions were abolished as part of a plan to restructure local governments, followed by elections in 2001. Many of the functions previously handled at a provincial level had been transferred to individual districts and tehsils. In 2008, the government restored the former divisions and appointed commissioners.

In 2009, the Northern Areas were renamed to Gilgit-Baltistan, and retained its formal status as an autonomous territory. In 2010, the North-West Frontier Province was formally renamed to Khyber Pakhtunkhwa. In 2018, the National Assembly of Pakistan and Khyber Pakhtunkhwa Provincial Assembly passed the historic FATA Merger Bill with the Twenty-Fifth Constitutional Amendment. On 31 May 2018, the final step in the merger of the Federally Administered Tribal Areas with Khyber Pakhtunkhwa was completed, as then-President Mamnoon Hussain signed the 25th Constitutional Amendment Bill into law. The amendment's signing abolished the Federally Administered Tribal Areas as a separate political entity and merged them into the province of Khyber Pakhtunkhwa.

== Tiers of governance ==
The diagram below outlines the six tiers of government:

Islamic Republic of Pakistan
Province (e.g. Punjab Province)
Division (e.g. Rawalpindi Division)
District (e.g. Jhelum District)
Tehsil (e.g. Sohawa Tehsil)
Union Council (e.g. Domeli U.C.)

=== Division ===
The Provinces and administrative territories of Pakistan are subdivided into administrative "divisions", Divisional Commissioner is the administrative head of a division. Divisional Commissioner is appointed by the government of Pakistan from Pakistan Administrative Service

=== District ===
The District Coordination Officer is the administrative head of the District Administration. They have wide-ranging responsibility for overseeing, improving and directing the approved plans of the District Government.

The Zila Nazim used to be the executive head of the District Administration until 2010 when the government gave their powers to the District Coordination Officers also. Their role is similar to district governor or prefect, with responsibility for implementing government strategy and developing initiatives arising out of it.

In order to decentralize administrative and financial authority to be accountable to Local Governments, for good governance, effective delivery of services, and transparent decision making through institutionalized participation of the people at grassroots level, elections to the local government institutions are held after every four years on none party basis by the Chief Election Commissioner of Pakistan.

=== Tehsil ===
Among the three tiers of local government, tehsil government is the second tier. It is where the functions, responsibilities, and authorities of districts government are divided into smaller units, these units are known as "tehsils". The tehsils are used all over Pakistan except Sindh province where the word "taluka" is used instead, although the functions and authorities are the same. The head of the Tehsil government is "Tehsil Nazim" who is assisted by the tehsil Naib-Nazim. Every tehsil has a Tehsil Municipal Administration, consisting of a tehsil council, Tehsil Nazim, tehsil/taluka municipal officer (TMO), chief officer and other officials of the local council.

=== Union council ===
Members of the union council including Union Administrator and Vice Union Administrator are elected through direct elections based on adult franchise and on the basis of joint electorate. However, for the election to the reserved seats for women in Zila Council proportionately divided among tehsils or towns shall be all members of the union councils in a tehsil or town. It is the responsibility of the Chief Election Commissioner to organize and conduct these elections.

== Current administrative units ==
Name (English)	Abbr.	Capital and largest city	Emblem	Flag	Map
Azad Jammu and Kashmir (Note: Disputed with India.)	AJK	Muzaffarabad			
Balochistan	BA	Quetta			
Gilgit-Baltistan	GB	Gilgit			
Islamabad Capital Territory	IS/ICT	Islamabad			
Khyber Pakhtunkhwa	KP/KPK	Peshawar			
Punjab	PB	Lahore			
Sindh	SD	Karachi			
Pakistan	PAK	Islamabad			

Note: (a) 2023 Population total excludes Azad Kashmir and Gilgit-Baltistan

== Uncontrolled administrative units ==
Name (English)	Capital and largest city	Emblem	Flag	Map
Jammu and Kashmir	Srinagar	N/A	N/A	
Junagadh	Junagadh			

== At independence ==
=== (i) Provinces of Pakistan ===
Name	Capital	Emblem	Flag	Map
East Bengal مشرقی بنگال পূর্ব বাংলা	Dacca ڈھاکہ ঢাকা		None	
West Punjab مغربی پنجاب পশ্চিম পাঞ্জাব	Lahore لاہور লাহোর			
Sind سندھ সিন্ধু	Hyderabad حیدر آباد হায়দ্রাবাদ			
North-West Frontier شمال مغربی سرحدی উত্তর-পশ্চিম সীমান্ত	Peshawar پشاور পেশাওয়ার			
Baluchistan بلوچستان বেলুচিস্তান	Quetta کوئٹہ কোয়েটা			

=== (ii) Federal Capital Territory of Pakistan ===
Name	Capital	Emblem	Flag	Map
Federal Capital Territory وفاقی دارالحکومت বেফাকী রাজধানী এলাকা	Karachi کراچی করাচী	Emblem of Federal Capital Territory	Flag of Federal Capital Territory	Federal Capital Territory

=== (iii) Princely States of Pakistan ===
Between August 1947 and March 1948, the rulers of the following princely states (which had existed alongside but outside British India) acceded their states to Pakistan, giving up control of their external affairs, while all retaining internal self-government, at least to begin with. This was lost by stages, until by 1974 all of the states had been fully integrated into Pakistan.

Name	Capital	Coat of arms	Flag	Map
Bahawalpur بہاولپور বাহাওয়ালপুর	Bahawalpur بہاولپور বাহাওয়ালপুর			
Khairpur خیرپور খয়েরপুর	Khairpur خیرپور খয়েরপুর	None		
Kalat قلات কালাত	Kalat قلات কালাত	None		
Lasbela لسبیلہ লাস বেলা	Bela بیلا বেলা	None		
Kharan خاران খারান	Kharan خاران খারান	None		
Makran مکران মাকরন	Kech کیچ কেচ	None		
Phulra پھلرا ফুলরা	Amb امب আমবা	None	None	
Amb امب আমবা	Shergard شیر گڑھ শেরগড়			
Swat سوات সোয়াত	Saidu Sharif سیدو شریف সাইদু শরীফ	None		
Dir دیر দির	Dir دیر দির	None		
Chitral چترال চিত্রল	Chitral چترال বুনি			
Hunza ہنزہ হুনজা	Baltit بلتیت বাল্টিট			
Nagar نگر নগর	Nagarkhas نگرخاس নগরখাস			
Gilgit گلگت ایجنسی গিলগিট রাষ্ট্রসংস্থা	Gilgit گلگت গিলগিট	None	None	

== Proposed provinces ==
- Bahawalpur Province
- South Punjab Province
- South Balochistan
- Karachi Province / Jinnahpur Province
- Hazara Province
- Gilgit-Baltistan Province / Balawaristan Province / Karakoram Province
- Review of the Divisions of Pakistan for New Provinces

== See also ==
- Cantonment (Pakistan), permanent military stations, which may include significant civilian populations
- Former administrative units of Pakistan
- Former princely states of Pakistan
- ISO 3166-2:PK
- List of capitals in Pakistan
- List of cities in Pakistan by population
- List of Pakistani administrative units by gross state product
- List of Pakistani administrative divisions by highest elevation
- Local government in Pakistan
  - Divisions of Pakistan
  - Districts of Pakistan
  - Tehsils of Pakistan
  - Union councils of Pakistan
