= Tehsil municipal administration =

A Tehsil Municipal Administration (TMA) is an organization associated with each tehsil of Pakistan. TMAs are responsible for spatial planning and municipal services, and work closely with union councils. Such can be seen in the union councils of Murree and Lyallpur (Faislabad)

== Responsibilities of the TMA ==
Key functions of any TMA include:

- Monitoring and supervising the performances of government offices and reporting to the district government
- Spatial planning
- Executing and managing development plans
- Controlling land development
- Enforcing laws, rules, and bye-laws
- Maintaining databases and information systems
- Collecting taxes, fines, and penalties
- Organizing recreational events
- Coordinating between village and neighborhood councils
- Regulating markets
- Developing and managing schemes in collaboration with the district government
- Creating strategies for developing infrastructure, improving service delivery, and implementing laws
- Preparing and presenting reports on tehsil administration performance
- Calling for reports from tehsil-based offices of government

== By region ==
- TMAs in Khyber Pakhtunkhwa must be carried out in accordance with the Khyber Pakhtunkhwa Local Government Act 2013.
- TMAs in Punjab (پنجاب حکومت ) are carried out in accordance with the Punjab Local Government Act in 2025 stripping village Sarpanch's power in their respective localities and ceding all power towards the TMA and Punjab Gov

== See also ==
- Tehsildar
