= Mir Painda Khan =

- Nawab

7th Nawab of Tanawal
- Reign: 1818–1844
- Predecessor: Mir Nawab Khan
- Successor: Mir Jahandad Khan
- Born: 6 May 1805; Amb, Tanawal (present-day Khyber Pakhtunkhwa, Pakistan)
- Died: 12 September 1844; Haripur, Sikh Empire (present-day Khyber Pakhtunkhwa, Pakistan)
- Burial: 1844; Darband, Khyber Pakhtunkhwa
- Issue: Mir Jahandad Khan
Names
- Mir Painda Khan Tanoli
- Dynasty: Tanoli
- Father: Mir Nawab Khan
- Religion: Sunni Islam
- Military career
- Conflicts: Amb-Sikh Wars X

Painda Khan Tanoli, was a powerful 19th-century chief of Tanawal. He became the ruler of the declining Mulk Tanol after the death of his father, during a time when the region faced repeated attacks from both the Sikh and Afghan empires.

His father, Nawab Khan, defied the Durranis but was killed at the hands of Azim Khan in 1818. He played a considerable part in opposing the Sikh Empire.

== Life ==
The Hindwals were not at first disposed to accept Painda Khan as their leader, but, with the aid of hired servants and mercenaries, he collected the most influential men of his fellow clansmen, killed many of them and reduced the rest to the level of rent-paying tenants. Painda Khan was constantly at conflict with the Palal section of Tanolis, Utmanzais, Syed Ahmad Barelvi and his followers, and Sikhs. In 1828, Hari Singh Nalwa drove the Hindustanis out of Tanawal and made the country over to Painda Khan again, taking his son Jahandad Khan as a hostage with him to Lahore. Shortly afterwards, Painda Khan recovered Amb and also seized the Sikh forts at Qadirabad and Kirpilian. At the close of 1830, he seized an envoy who was sent to settle the disturbances and kept him till the release of Jahandad Khan, who was ultimately sent back. He had 500 horses and 2,000 infantry, most of whom were Hindustani followers of Syed Ahmad Barelvi. In 1837, he captured the fort of Chandu. He seized Hindus and Sikhs, exhorted ransom, otherwise tying a stone around their necks, flung them into the river. He derived revenue from the Sikhs, who were never able to keep this country in order. Painda Khan died in 1844 and was succeeded by his son Jahandad Khan.

James Abbott, British deputy commissioner at Hazara in 1851 commented that

"During the first period of Painda Khan's career, he was far too vigorous and powerful to be molested by any neighbouring tribe, and when he began to fail before the armies and purse of the Sikh Government, he was interested in keeping upon the best terms with his northern neighbours of the Black Mountains to whom he allowed the privilege of pasture in the small Tupa of Turrowra."

Abbott further described Painda Khan as "a Chief renowned on the Border, a wild and energetic man who was never subjugated by the Sikhs".

== Timeline ==
1809 – Birth of Painda Khan Tanoli in Tanawal.

His father, Mir Nawab Khan Tanoli, was then chief of the Tanolis.

1818 – Death of Mir Nawab Khan Tanoli.

At just 9 years old, Painda Khan inherited leadership of Mulk Tanol. His early rule coincided with Sikh expansion and Afghan decline.

1819–1822 – Early Skirmishes.

Painda Khan resisted Afghan and Sikh influence in Hazara. His territory was often attacked by neighboring chiefs aligned with stronger powers.

1823 – Battle of Nowshera (near Peshawar).

Maharaja Ranjit Singh’s general Hari Singh Nalwa defeated the Afghans under Azim Khan Barakzai. This extended Sikh power into Hazara. Painda Khan opposed the Sikh advance, beginning decades of hostility with Nalwa.

1820s–1830s – Continuous Guerrilla Resistance.

- Painda Khan fought Sikh forces using mountain warfare.
- He allied with other Hazara tribes (Swatis, Mashwanis, etc.) when possible.
- The Sikhs tried several expeditions into Tanawal, but Painda Khan’s rugged homeland gave him an advantage.

1831–1834 – Clashes Intensify.

Hari Singh Nalwa was made Governor of Hazara by Ranjit Singh. He attempted to subdue Painda Khan, who responded with repeated raids and ambushes. The Tanawal valley became a constant battlefield.

1837 – Battle of Jamrud (near Khyber).

Although Painda Khan was not the main commander, his support against the Sikhs aligned him with the wider Afghan resistance. This period cemented his reputation as a fierce enemy of Sikh expansion.

1838–1840 – Painda Khan’s Power Peaks.

He expanded his influence across Hazara, and despite being constantly at war, he retained strong independence. The Sikhs could never fully subdue him.

1844 – Death of Sardar Painda Khan Tanoli.

After a turbulent life of warfare, Painda Khan died in 1844 poisoned by Sikh. He was succeeded by his son Jehandad Khan Tanoli, later recognized by the British as Nawab of Amb.
