= Subsidiary alliance =

Tributary alliance between an Indian princely state and an East India Company

Joseph François Dupleix, who pioneered the system of subsidiary alliances

A subsidiary alliance, in South Asian history, was a tributary alliance between an Indian state and a European East India Company, most notably the British East India Company.

Under this system, an Indian ruler who formed an agreement with the company concerned was provided with protection against external attacks. In return, the ruler was required to:

- Maintain the Company's army at or near the capital of the state;
- Accept the British as the supreme power in matters of external affairs;
- Provide money or territory to the Company for the maintenance of the troops;
- Expel all other Europeans from the state and refrain from employing them in military or civil services;
- Maintain a British official, known as a Resident, at the capital, who supervised diplomatic relations and correspondence with other states, thereby preventing the ruler from conducting foreign relations without British approval.

The ruler was also forbidden from maintaining an independent standing army. Although internal administration formally remained with the ruler, agents of the East India Company increasingly interfered in the internal affairs of allied states, including succession disputes and governance.

== Development ==
The system of subsidiary alliances was first pioneered in the Carnatic region by Joseph François Dupleix. It was later adopted and expanded by the British East India Company.

Following the British victory at the Battle of Plassey (1757), Robert Clive imposed alliance conditions on Mir Jafar. These arrangements were further consolidated after the British victory at the Battle of Buxar (1764) and formalised by the Treaty of Allahabad (1765).

The policy reached its most systematic form under Richard Wellesley, Governor-General of India from 1798 to 1805. In a dispatch dated February 1801 to the East India Company Resident at Hyderabad, Wellesley outlined the strategic objectives of subsidiary alliances:

"His Excellency the Governor-General's policy in establishing subsidiary alliances with the principal states of India is to place those states in such a degree of dependence on the British power as may deprive them of the means of forming any confederacy hazardous to the security of the British empire, and may enable us to preserve the tranquillity of India by exercising a general control over those states..."
— Richard Wellesley, 4 February 1801

By the late 18th century, the decline of the Maratha Empire had left the Indian subcontinent fragmented into numerous states, many of them militarily weak. Several rulers accepted subsidiary alliances as a means of protection against regional rivals.

The Nizam of Hyderabad was the first ruler to accept a well-defined subsidiary alliance in 1798. Tipu Sultan of the Kingdom of Mysore initially resisted the system, but following British victory in the Fourth Anglo-Mysore War (1799), Mysore was reduced to a subsidiary state before later coming under direct Company rule.

After the Third Anglo-Maratha War (1817–1819), the Maratha ruler Baji Rao II also accepted a subsidiary alliance.

Other states that entered into subsidiary alliances included Tanjore (1799), Awadh (1801), the Peshwa (1802), the Bhonsle kingdom (1803), Scindia (1804), Singrauli (1814), and the Rajput states of Jaipur and Jodhpur (1818).

The Holkar State of Indore was the last major member of the Maratha Confederacy to accept a subsidiary alliance, doing so in 1818.

== See also ==
- British East India Company
- Tributary state
- British protectorate
- Client state
- Indirect rule
- Rajputana Agency
