= Phulra =

Princely state of British India

Kingdom of Phulra Punjabi: ریاست پھلڑا
- Princely state of Pakistan
- 1828–1950
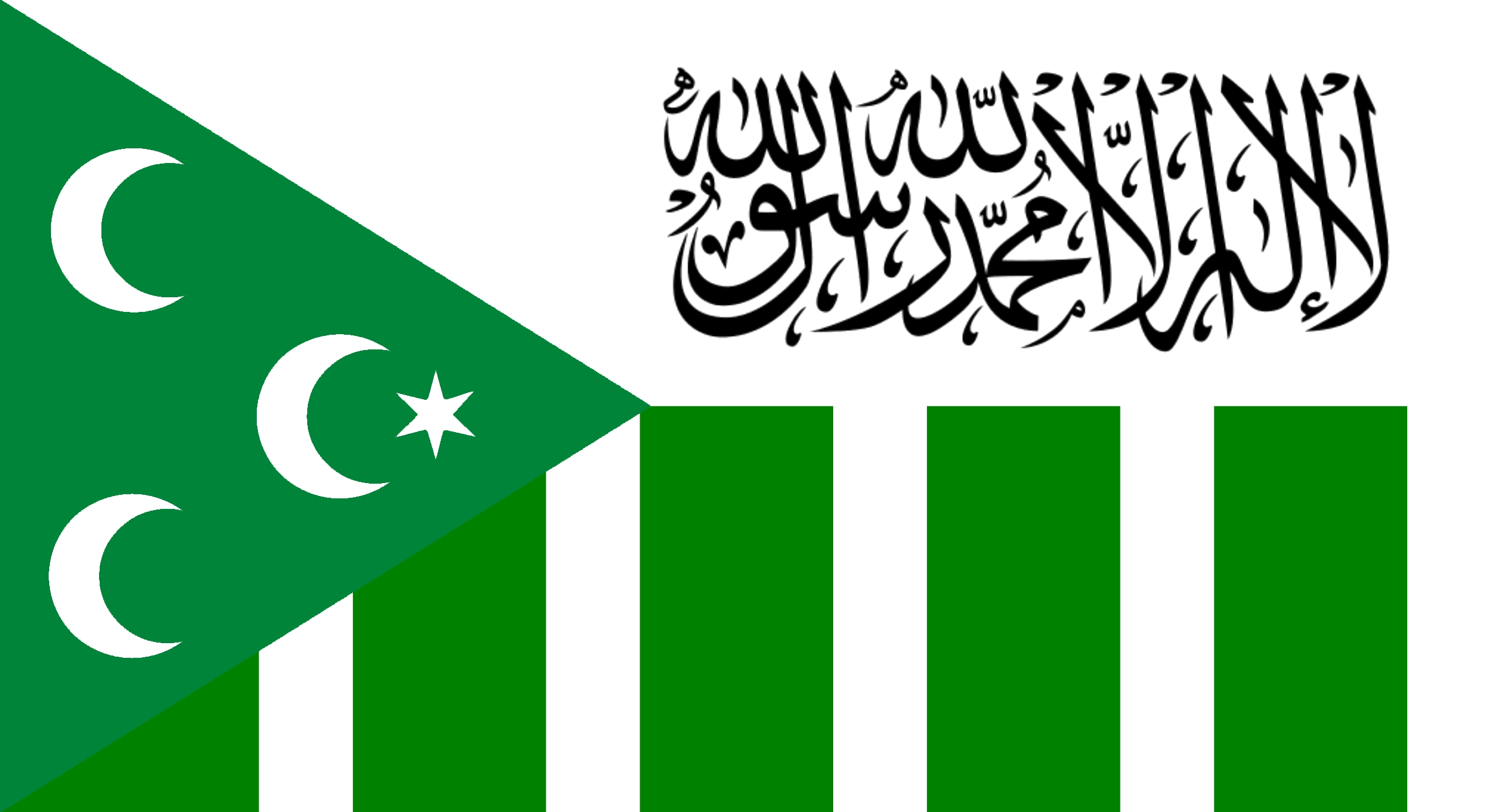
- Flag

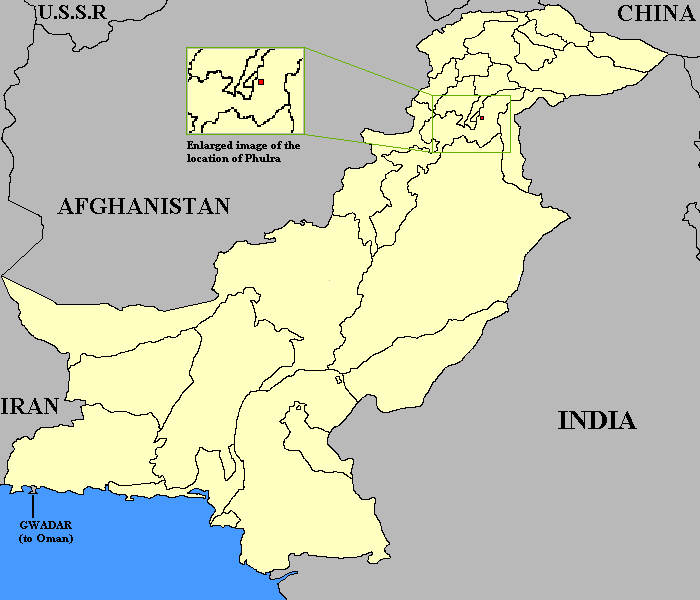
- Map of Pakistan with Phulra highlighted
- Capital: Amb, Pakistan
- Area
- 98 km^{2} (38 sq mi)
  - Type: Jagirdar
- History
  - Established: 1828
  - Disestablished: 1950
| Succeeded by |
| North-West Frontier Province |
- Today part of: Pakistan · Khyber Pakhtunkhwa
- Government of Khyber-Pakhtunkhwa

Phulra or the State of Phulra (ریاست پھلڑا) was a Muslim princely state in the days of British Raj and ruled by the Tanoli tribe, located in the region of the North West Frontier to the east of the nearby parent princely state of Amb (Tanawal).

The territory covered by the state is part of the present-day Khyber Pakhtunkhwa, as a Union Council of the tehsil of Mansehra.

== History ==
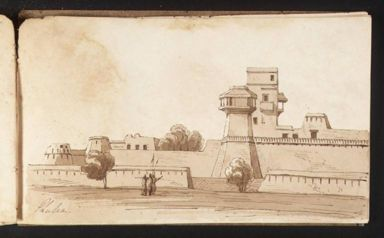
A fort in Phulra, 1833

The state was founded in 1828, when Nawab Khan, the ruler of Amb, granted the area of Phulra as a small principality to his son, Maddad Khan Tanoli. There is some uncertainty as to whether Phulra ranked as a full princely state of India before 1919; it might until then have had the status of a feudatory landed estate, but it was given British imperial state recognition as Phulra was recognised as a princely state in 1828 and 1921, in the official Imperial Gazetteer of Indian Empire. Phulrah had been under suzerainty of the Raja of Kashmir until 1889, when it accepted a British protectorate, entering into a subsidiary alliance with British India.

In 1947, soon after the British had departed from the Indian subcontinent, the last ruler of Phulra signed an Instrument of Accession to the new Dominion of Pakistan, and Phulra was a princely state of Pakistan from then until September 1950, when it was incorporated into the North West Frontier Province following the death of its last ruler.

== Dynasty ==
The state was ruled by a collateral line of the hereditary Tanoli Nawabs (rulers) of Amb. Amb and Phulra together were sometimes referred to as "Feudal Tanawal".

| Tenure | Nawabs of Phulra |
|---|---|
| 1810-1818 | Mir Nawab Khan Tanoli |
| 1828-1857 | Khan Maddad Khan Tanoli |
| 1858-1890 | Khan Abdullah Khan Tanoli |
| 1890-1908 | Khan Abdul (Abdur) Rahman Khan Tanoli |
| 1908-1932 | Nawab Ata Muhammad Khan Tanoli (1879–1932) State was founded. |
| 1932-1950 | Nawab Abdul Latif Khan Tanoli (1907–1950) |
| September 1950 | State of Phulra abolished |

=== Descendants of Maddad Khan ===
Maddad Khan, the original Khan of Phulra, had two branches of offspring. After the State of Phulra was abolished, both these branches continued to reside in the area. The descendants of its last Nawab, Abdul Latif Khan Tanoli, remained in the area as private residents.

Of the junior branch, Maddad Khan Tanoli had four sons from one wife: Ameer Khan Tanoli, Abdullah Khan Tanoli, Arsla Khan Tanoli and Hussain Khan Tanoli, whose son was Safiullah Khan Tanoli. From his second wife, Bahadur Khan Tanoli had one other surviving son. Their descendants are living today as private citizens in Gojra, Masand, Doga, Shergarh, Kangra, and in Rawalpindi.

== See also ==
- Amb (princely state)

== External links and sources ==
- Government of Khyber-Pakhtunkhwa
- Government of Pakistan
- WorldStatesmen - Pakistan - Princely States
- https://www.scribd.com/doc/63020034/Tarikh-E-Hazara-Original-by-Dr-Sher-Bahadur-Khan-Punni-V01
