= Tanoli =

Hindkowan tribe

- Ethnicity: Hazarewal
- Location: Hazara, Pakistan
- Branches: Hindwal Tappa, Palwal Tappa
- Language: Hindko
- Religion: Islam

The Tanoli (Hindko: تناؤلی; Urdu: تنولی) is a Hindko-speaking Hazarewal tribe from the Hazara region of Khyber Pakhtunkhwa, Pakistan.

They have two major divisions, namely Palwal (پل آل) and Hindwal (ہند آل).

== History ==
The exact origins of the Tanoli is uncertain, and whatever is known depends on folk history. According to one theory, the tribe was driven out of its original homeland across the Indus by the Yousafzai Pashtuns arriving from Afghanistan, with the Tanoli later settling in Hazara. According to another tradition both the Tanoli clan and the Janjua clan of Pothohar descend from one Raja Mal through his two sons, Raja Tanoli (also known as Raja Tanawali) and Raja Jodh, respectively. Raja Tanoli was succeeded by his son Amir Khan Tanoli, whose two sons Hind Khan and Pal Khan became the ancestors of the two Tanoli subtribes. According to the anthropologist S. S. Shashi there is historical evidence for this tradition. The historian Dr. Hussain Khan also expresses similar views, noting that Darband, the historical capital of the Tanoli, was inhabited by the Janjua during the reign of Mughal emperor Akbar. According to Ain-i-Akbari the Janjua chief of Darband was to maintain a cavalry of 20 and an infantry of 500. According to Khan, the Tanawal tract gained its named from Raja Tanawali, and his descendants came to be known after him. He also rejects the claims of Mughal decent of Tanoli tribe. Shashi further notes that the names of Tanoli subtribes, Hindwal and Palwal, do not follow the usual Pashtun conventions of naming, which end in -khel or -zai.

The first mention of Tanoli tribe in its present region dates to 13th century. Tanawal was invaded by the Yousafzai during the Mughal period, and later became a part of Kashmir during the Durrani rule. The Tanoli chief Mir Painda Khan lost much of his lands to the Sikh Empire but his son Mir Jehandad Khan recovered them through the favour of Maharaja Gulab Singh and the British government. During the British colonial period the Tanawal tract consisted of the two princely states of Amb and Phulra, which acceded to Pakistan after 1947.

The Tanoli never submitted to the British colonial rule in the 1840s. They form the majority of the population of Lassan Nawab union council.

== Notable people ==
- Suba Khan Tanoli, Tanoli chieftain who fought on Afghan side in the Third Battle of Panipat
- Nawabzada Farid Salahuddin Tanoli, Pakistani politician
- Muhammad Khan Zaman Khan, Nawab of Amb
