= Darband, Mansehra =

Darband
- Union council and town
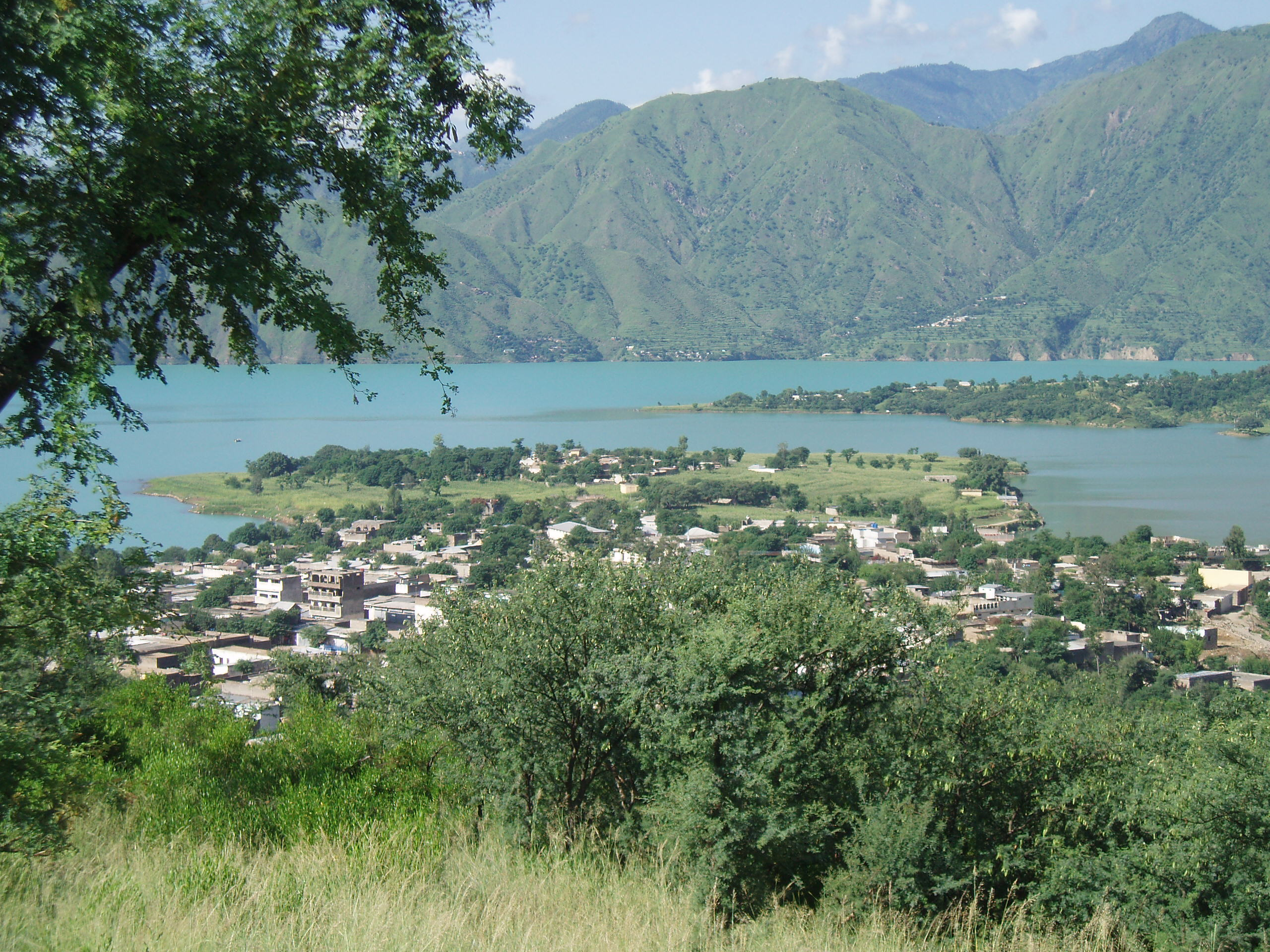

- Location in Pakistan
- Coordinates: 34°19′N 72°52′E
- Country: Pakistan
- Province: Khyber Pakhtunkhwa
- District: Mansehra
- Region: Lower Pakhli

Government
  - Chairman: Dilbar Khan Tanoli (Pakistan Tehreek e Insaf)
- Time zone: UTC+5 (PST)
- Postal code: 21460

Darband (دربند) is a town and headquarters of Darband Tehsil of Mansehra District in the Khyber Pakhtunkhwa province of Pakistan. It was created as a separate tehsil in late August 2017 comprising three union councils (Darband itself, Nika Pani and Shanaya) that had until then been part of Oghi Tehsil. Darband was once the capital of former princely state of Amb, which was disestablished in 1969.

== Climate ==
Darband's climate is classified as warm and temperate. Darband has a significant amount of rainfall during the year. This is true even for the driest month. Köppen and Geiger classify this climate as Cfa. The average annual temperature in Darband is 18.2 °C (64.8 °F). Annually, approximately 1,152 mm (45.4 in) of precipitation descends.
