= Amb (princely state) =

Former princely state of the British Indian Empire and Pakistan

Coordinates: 34°21′53″N 72°51′34″E

- 1710–28 July 1969
- Flag Coat of arms

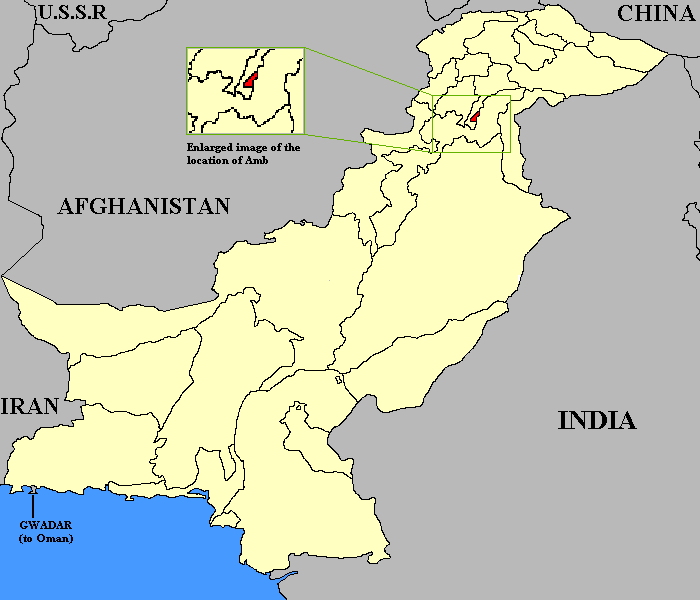
- Amb state in 1947 within West Pakistan
- Capital: Darband; Shergarh (summer residence)
- Government: Monarchy
- History
  - Established: 1710
  - British (EIC) suzerainty: 1849
  - Acceded to Pakistan: December 1947
  - Incorporated into West Pakistan: 28 July 1969

Area
- 1951: 530 km^{2} (200 sq mi)
- 1807: 16,274 km^{2} (6,283 sq mi)

Population
  - 1951: 48,656
- Today part of: Khyber Pakhtunkhwa, Pakistan

Amb (Urdu, Hindko: امب) was a princely state within the Hazara Tribal Agency of North-West Frontier Province, British India, ruled by the Tanoli tribe. Together with the neighbouring estate of Phulra, the tract was known as "Feudal Tanawal". It covered an area of 203 mi^{2} (530 km^{2}) with a population of 48,656 in 1951.

In 1801 rapid rise in the power of Mulk Tanol led to conflicts with both the Sikh and the Afghan Empire. The Sikhs and Afghans later formed an alliance against the Tanolis, which led to the fall of Mulk Tanol after the Battle of Peshawar in 1818. Shuja Shah Durrani also offered the Koh-i-Noor to Maharaja Ranjit Singh in return for his support. The French general Claude Auguste Court also served in the Sikh Empire.

Later, the British provided significant assistance to Tanolis. After the Second Anglo-Sikh War, remaining territory of Mulk Tanol came under British suzerainty, and Jehandad Khan Tanoli provided considerable assistance to the East India Company against the Sikhs. The rulers of Tanol recovered some of their territory with the help of the British Empire after the British defeated the Afghan and Sikh forces in the region. In the 1870s, the British recognised this territory as a separate kingdom and named it Amb, after the village that was known as Embolina during the time of Alexander the Great and Alexander invasion on Indus.

The Amb Nawabs also provided military services to the British Empire in the Second Anglo-Afghan War. Muhammad Farid Khan, the Nawab of Amb, acceded to Pakistan after the independence in December 1947. Amb continued to exist as a princely state of Pakistan until 1969, when it was incorporated into the West Pakistan (now part of the province of Khyber Pakhtunkhwa, Pakistan). Today Amb is a part of Mansehra District of Hazara Division.

Original painting of Sultan Zabardust Khan Tanoli son of Bahadur khan by Jean-Baptiste Lamarck in 1774. He was considered one of the most powerful monarchs in Tanoli History.

== History ==
=== Nawab Khan Tanoli ===
Mir Nawab Khan Tanoli was the ruler of Tanawal Valley and the chief of the Hazara region from 1810 until he died in 1818. During his rule, he faced many attacks from the Sikh Empire and Durrani Empire, resulting in a significant loss of territory. He was 26 years old, when he was assassinated by Azim Khan on October 13, 1818 during the Stratagem of Peshawar.

The main reason for the conflict was that Mir Nawab Khan defied Durranis. After Azim Khan took the complaint to the Afghan court, the Afghan Ruler of that time immediately sent his army.

Nawab Khan Tanoli's sons, Painda Khan and Maddad Khan began a series of rebellion against the Sikhs and Durranis, which continued throughout his lifetime.

=== Painda Khan Tanoli ===
From about 1813, Painda Khan Tanoli is known for his rebellion against Maharaja Ranjit Singh's governors of Hazara. He was the son of Mir Nawab Khan Tanoli.

From about 1813, Painda Khan Tanoli engaged in a long rebellion against the Sikhs, who, realizing the potential dangers of his rebellion, set up forts at strategic locations to keep him in check. Hari Singh Nalwa took this initiative during his governorship. To consolidate his hold on Tanawal and to unite the Tanoli people, Tanoli first had to contend with his major rivals within the tribe itself, that is, the chiefs of the Suba Khani (Pallal Khel) section, whom he subdued after a bitter struggle.

Painda Khan set the tone for regional resistance in Upper Hazara against Sikh rule. In 1828, he created and gifted the smaller neighbouring state of Phulra to his younger brother Maddad Khan Tanoli.

Painda Khan briefly took over the valley of Agror in 1834. Agror was restored to Ata Muhammad Khan, the chief of that area, a descendant of Akhund Ahmed Sad-ud-din.

=== Jehandad Khan Tanoli ===
Jehandad Khan was a son of Painda Khan Tanoli. In 1852, Jehandad Khan was summoned by the President of the Board of Administration about a murder enquiry of two British officers, supposedly on his lands. In fact, this was related to the murder of two British salt tax collectors by some tribesmen in the neighbouring Kala Dhaka or Black Mountain area, which eventually led to the punitive First Black Mountain campaign of 1852. The Board of Administration President was Sir John Lawrence (later the Lieutenant-Governor of the Punjab), and he visited Haripur, in Hazara, where he invited many Hazara chiefs to see him on various matters, at a general Durbar. Jehandad Khan Tanoli succeeded in establishing his innocence and consolidated his position.

Jahandad Khan Tanoli's relationship with British India is summed in the following lines in a letter dated 8 January 1859 from R. Temple, Secretary to the Punjab Chief Commissioner, addressed to the Punjab Financial Commissioner: The term "Jagir" has never appeared to me applicable in any sense to this [Jehandad Khan's] hereditary domain [Upper Tannowul], for it was never granted as such by the Sikhs or by our Government; we upheld the Khan as we found him in his position as a feudal lord and large proprietor.'

Jehandad's son, Nawab Bahadur Sir Muhammed Akram Khan Tanoli, was given the title of Nawab (Sovereign Ruler) in perpetuity by the British.

=== Muhammad Akram Khan Tanoli ===
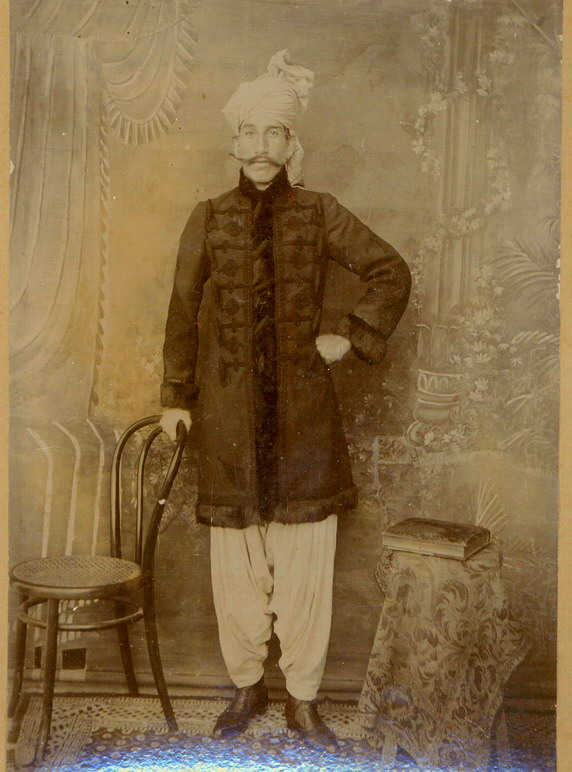
Nawabzada Mohammad Ismail Khan Tanoli, Son of Nawab Sir Mohammad Akram Khan Tanoli, at Delhi Durbaar, Delhi 1911.

The next chief of the Tanoli, a son of Jahandad Khan Tanoli, was Akram Khan Tanoli KCSI (1868–1907). He was a popular chief. During his tenure, the fort at Shergarh was built along with forts in Dogah and Shahkot. His rule was a peaceful time for Tanawal. He constructed schools in the state on the advice of the British.

=== Muhammad Khan Zaman Khan Tanoli ===
Khan Zaman Khan Tanoli succeeded his father, taking over the reins of power in Tanawal in Amb. He helped the British in carrying out the later Black Mountain (Kala Dhaka/Tor Ghar) expeditions.

=== Muhammad Farid Khan Tanoli ===
Muhammad Farid Khan Tanoli had good relations with Muhammad Ali Jinnah and Liaqat Ali Khan. His contributions to the Pakistan movement have been acknowledged by letters from Jinnah. In 1947, he acceded his state to Pakistan by signing the Instrument of Accession in favour of Pakistan. In 1969, the state was incorporated into West Pakistan (now part of the province of Khyber-Pakhtunkhwa, Pakistan) and in 1972, the Government of Pakistan ceased to recognise the royal status of the Nawab.

=== Muhammad Saeed Khan Tanoli ===
Nawab Muhammad Saeed Khan Tanoli

Muhammad Saeed Khan Tanoli, son of Muhammad Farid Khan Tanoli, the last nawab of Amb, studied at the Burn Hall School in Abbottabad (now the Army Burn Hall College) and the Gordon College in Rawalpindi. Nawab Saeed Khan Tanoli ruled for a period of three years.

=== Salahuddin Saeed Khan Tanoli ===
He is the son of Nawab Muhammad Saeed Khan Tanoli. He holds the record as the youngest parliamentarian ever elected to the Pakistan National Assembly, and then went on to be elected five times to the Pakistan National Assembly (from 1985 to 1997), a feat achieved by only seven other Pakistani parliamentarians, including the former Pakistani prime minister, Nawaz Sharif.

== List of Nawabs of Amb ==
Image	Titular Name	Personal Name	Date of birth	Nawab From	Nawab Until	Date of death
	Muhammad Anwar Khan Tanoli انور خان تنولی	Anwar Khan Tanoli	1688	1710	1730	1730
	Muhammad Bahadur Khan Tanoli بہادر خان	Muhammad Bahadur Khan Tanoli	23 June 1712	1730-1740	8 August 1755	8 August 1755
	Sultan Zaburdust Khan Tanoli صوبہ خان تنولی	Sultan Zaburdust Khan Tanoli	1 May 1736	8 August 1755	2 November 1783	
	Haibat Khan Tanoli ہیبت خان	Haibat Khan Tanoli	6 April 1740	1783	12 December 1798	
	Nawab Khan Tanoli نواب خان	Nawab Khan Tanoli	12 April 1792	1800-1810	13 October 1818	
	Painda Khan Tanoli پائنداخان	Painda Khan	6 May 1805	1818	1819-1822 completely Rule ended and hence again conquered and started in 1823	12 September 1844
	Jehandad Khan Tanoli جہانداد خان	Jehandad Khan Tanoli	6 February 1820	1844	1868	
	Nawab Muhammad Akram Khan Tanoli نواب محمد اکرم خان	Nawab Muhammad Akram Khan Tanoli	1859	1868	1907	
	Nawab Khan-e-Zaman Khan Tanoli نواب خانِ زمان خان تنولی خانخا	Nawab Khan Zaman Khan Tanoli	6 November 1880	1907	12 September 1936	
	Muhammad Farid Khan Tanoli فرید خان	Muhammad Farid Khan Tanoli	1 January 1904	1936	17 September 1947 (Alliance with Pakistan but continued rule until 1969)	28 July 1969 (Rule end due to fighting between the Descendants of Amb State and Pakistan Army occupied integration)
	Nawab Salahuddin Khan Tanoli صلاح الدین خان	Nawabzada Salahuddin Saeed	1958	1969	Incumbent	

== Also read ==
- Politics of Pakistan
- History of Pakistan
