= Amb, Pakistan =

Amb
- Location within Pakistan
- Coordinates: 34.19°N 72.51°E
- Country: Pakistan
- Elevation: 395 m (1,296 ft)
- Time zone: UTC+5 (PST)

Amb is a village in Khyber Pakhtunkhwa province of Pakistan. It lies on the west bank of the Indus River and now completely submerged under Tarbela Dam is mainly inhabited by the Tanoli tribe of Ghilzai Descent.

Formerly part of the princely state of Amb, which was named after the town, the town of Amb was integrated into Pakistan in 1969. Historically, Nawabs of Amb used to reside in Amb in the winter season.
