= Shah Ismail Dehlvi =

Indian Islamic scholar (1779–1831)

Personal life
- Born: 26 April 1779 Muzaffarnagar, Mughal Empire
- Died: 6 May 1831 (aged 52) Balakot, Sikh Empire
- Parent: Shah Abdul Ghani (father)
- Notable work: Taqwiyatul Imaan
- Education: Madrasah-i Rahimiyah
- Known for: Tariqat-i-Muhammadiyah movement
- Relatives: Shah Waliullah (grand-father)

Religious life
- Religion: Islam
- Denomination: Sunni
- Jurisprudence: Hanafi; Independent
- Tariqa: Naqshbandi
- Movement: Tariqat-i-Muhammadiyah

Muslim leader
- Influenced by: Ibn Taymiyyah; Muhammad bin AbdulWahhab
- Influenced: Subsequent scholars of the Deobandi and Ahl-i Hadith movements

Shah Isma’il Dehlvi (26 April, 1779 – 6 May, 1831) was an Indian Sunni Muslim scholar, Naqshbandi Sufi reformer, Hanafi jurist, and theologian. He, alongside Syed Ahmad Barelvi, was a founding figure of Tariqah-i-Muhammadiyah, an Islamic reformist and jihad movement against the Sikh Empire, which later spearheaded decades-long anti-colonial uprisings across various regions of British India. He is considered as an important influence on the Ahl-i Hadith and the Deobandi movements.

== Early life and career ==
Shah Isma’il was born on 26 April 1779. He was the grandson of famous Islamic scholar and leader Shah Waliullah Dehlvi, through his son Shah Abdul Ghani. When a new Islamic religious revivalist movement known as Tariqah-i-Muhammadiyah appeared in northern India under the leadership of Syed Ahmad of Raebareli (1786 – 1831), Syed Ahmad was joined by two members of the Shah Waliullah family: Shah Isma’il Dehlavi and Maulvi Abdul Hai (died 1828), due to the shared mission and objectives. The aim of the new movement was to purify the tenets of Islam from non-Islamic customs, traditions and cultural practices.

According to Barbara D. Metcalf, the objectives and teachings of the new reformist movement were outlined in two texts. First was the Sirat'ul Mustaqim (the Straight Path), compiled by Shah Isma’il in 1819. Originally written in Persian, it was later translated into Urdu in order to reach a wider audience. The second work, Taqwiyat al-Iman (the strengthening of the Faith), was written by Shah Isma’il directly in Urdu. The two works emphasised the centrality of tawhid, the transcendent unity of God, and condemned those practices and beliefs that were held in any way to compromise those which were considered most fundamental of Islamic tenets. According to Shah Isma’il, God alone was held to be omniscient and omnipotent; he alone was entitled to worship and homage. According to the followers of Syed Ahmad, there were three sources of threat to this belief: false Sufism, Shi'a doctrines and practices, and popular customs.

According to Andreas Rieck, Syed Ahmad visited towns of North Indian plains from 1818 to 1821 with hundreds of missionaries to preach against Shi'a beliefs and practices. Syed Ahmad repeatedly destroyed tazias, an act that resulted in subsequent riots and chaos. Shah Isma’il also wrote against making of tazias, stating that forcefully breaking a tazia was as virtuous an action as destroying idols.

In 1821, Shah Isma’il left for Hajj (pilgrimage) along with Syed Ahmad and a group of his devotees. He returned from Haj in 1823, and once again visited different parts of India. In his book, Sirat'ul Mustaqim, Shah Isma’il Dehlvi wrote that a large part of Hindustan had become Dar ul-Harb (the abode of war) and therefore jihad was obligatory for the Muslims; in contrast the Ottoman Empire was held to be Dar ul-Islam. Inspired by the teachings of Syed Ahmad, Shah Isma’il Dehlvi wrote several treatises explaining the orthodox Sufi teachings of the Tariqah-i-Muhammadiyah movement. In these works, he sought to outline Sayyid Ahmad's methodology and articulate the movement’s reformist vision.

In his treatises, such as Taqwiyat al-Iman and Tadhkir ul-Ikhwan, Shah Isma’il emphasized the importance of tawhid (monotheism) and the virtues of following the Sunnah. He categorized shirk (polytheism) into various types and warned against superstitious beliefs and certain folk rituals, denouncing them as shirk or bid'ah (innovation in religious matters). In Taqwiyat al-Iman, Shah Isma’il condemned practice of invoking spiritual guides, martyrs and angels during the times of difficulties, as well as giving children un-Islamic names and offering sacrifices to saints, calling them akin to the practices of Hindus.

== Jurisprudence ==
Shah Isma'il has been identified varyingly as a Hanafi or as a Ghayr Muqallid. It has been argued that Shah Isma'il repudiated taqlid (adherence to a school), and Ashraf Ali Thanwi has cited him as performing Raf al-Yadayn, a practice that is alien to the Hanafi school.

== Theology ==
=== Regarding God ===
Shah Isma'il believed that it is possible for God to lie (imkan-e-kidhb), although he believed that God never has nor will ever lie. Additionally, he believed that God finds out knowledge of the unseen whenever he wants, not believing that God has perfect, unacquired knowledge of all things. Moreover, he believed that it is an innovation to describe God as being free from space and time.

=== Regarding the Prophet ===
Shah Isma'il believed that the Prophet had died and turned to dust i.e. he believed that the Prophet's body is subject to decay, contrary to the popularly cited hadith that the bodies of Prophets do not decay. Furthermore, he believed that it is better to contemplate donkeys and cattle, or to even contemplate adultery, than to think of the Prophet in Salah.

== Tariqah-i-Muhammadiyah movement ==
Shah Isma’il broke away from various folk practices and customs that existed among Indian Hanafis, but subsequently became convinced that he could not set up his ideal society so long as the company rule held sway over the subcontinent. He joined the cause of Syed Ahmad, who had moved to the Peshawar Valley bordering Afghanistan with his followers to lead an armed jihad against the Sikhs. When the military actions were initiated, some Muslim Nawabs, like Amir Khan of Tonk, provided funds but did not join them for jihad. Around 8,000 mujahideen who accompanied them were mostly clergymen or poor people. The rulers of Tonk, Gwalior and Rampur supported him with British consent because they were dependent on British forces, and knew well enough that the British would not stop them from aiding an enemy of the Sikhs.

Syed Ahmad was proclaimed as the Amir ul-Mu'minin (Commander of the Faithful) by his followers. The main objective of the Tariqah-i-Muhammadiyah movement led by Syed Ahmad was to establish an Islamic state that would rule over the subcontinent. At that time, much of northern India was under British rule. So the leadership of the jihad movement concluded that they should move to an area with less British influence and with a majority Muslim population. The frontier region, known as Yaghistan, was chosen to carry out this experimentation, based on the assumption that being devout Muslims, the Pashtuns inhabitants would support the reformist movement.

=== Start of Jihad ===
Arriving in Peshawar Valley in late 1826, Syed Ahmad and his followers made their base in towns of Hund and Zaida in Swabi District. Syed Ahmad called upon the local Pashtun and Hazarewal tribes to wage jihad, and demanded that they renounce their tribal customs and adopt the Shari'a. The traditional khans were replaced by ulama (Islamic scholars) and a system of Islamic taxes was established to finance the jihad. Soon after this evangelist campaign and the establishment of the Sharia system, jihad was declared. He sent an ultimatum to Ranjit Singh, demanding him to accept Islam, or pay jizyah, or to prepare for an open war, further mentioning that in the case of later, all of Yaghistan supported his movement.

The mujahideen were educated with both theological doctrines and physical training sessions. Syed Ahmad organized wrestling, archery training, and shooting competitions. The mujahideen also repeated several Islamic anthems. One such popular anthem has survived, known as "Risala Jihad". On 21 December 1826, Syed Ahmad and his 1,500 followers clashed with 4,000 Sikh troops in the battle of Akora Khattak and obtained a significant victory. On 11 January 1827, allegiance was sworn on his hand and he was declared caliph and imam. Syed Ahmad's claim to khilafah was viewed with suspicion in the frontier region as well as in the clerical circles of northern India. When the jumu'ah (Friday prayer) sermon was read in his name, symbolizing his claim to power, the tribal chiefs became wary. According to prominent Pashtun sardars like Khadi Khan, maulvis were ill-equipped to run the affairs of a state. In response to the criticisms, Syed Ahmad asserted that his aim was not material but to lead a jihad against kuffar.

=== Reforms ===
In addition to the stated social agenda, Syed Ahmad also enforced collection of the Islamic tithe (usher) of ten per cent of crop yields. This policy was faced with fierce opposition from an alliance of local Pashtun tribesmen, who briefly managed to occupy Peshawar. In 1830, The alliance was defeated and the Islamic reformers finally captured Peshawar. After the conquest of Peshawar by the mujahideen, Syed Ahmad announced the abolition of all tribal rituals that he regarded as bid'ah (religious innovations). He abolished various practices such as: the bride being paid a regular price for marriage; the widowed of the deceased Muslims being divided among his heirs; practice of more than four marriages; denial of inheritance to women; clan wars being considered like jihad and its plunder being considered as booty. He also pushed for aggressive and violent policies to enforce Shari'a. These included: allowing brides as long as half of the agreed money was given; young girls eligible for marriage should be married immediately; flogging people who did not pray.

=== Downfall ===
Over several months during 1830, Sayyed Ahmad tried to conciliate established power hierarchies. But before the end of 1830, an organized uprising occurred and the agents of Syed Ahmad in Peshawar and in the villages of the plain were murdered by the Pashtun tribesmen, and the movement retreated to the hills.

Ranjit Singh sent his powerful Sikh army to fight mujahideen, and the two sides met at Balakot. Shah Isma’il and Syed Ahmad were killed on 6 May 1831 during a fierce battle at Balakot against the army of Ranjit Singh. Traditional scholarship accuses the Pashtun tribes of betraying the movement. According to some other historians, the British government wanted to shift the troublesome elements from the territory under their control to that of the Sikhs' in order to weaken the Sikh rule.

== Legacy ==
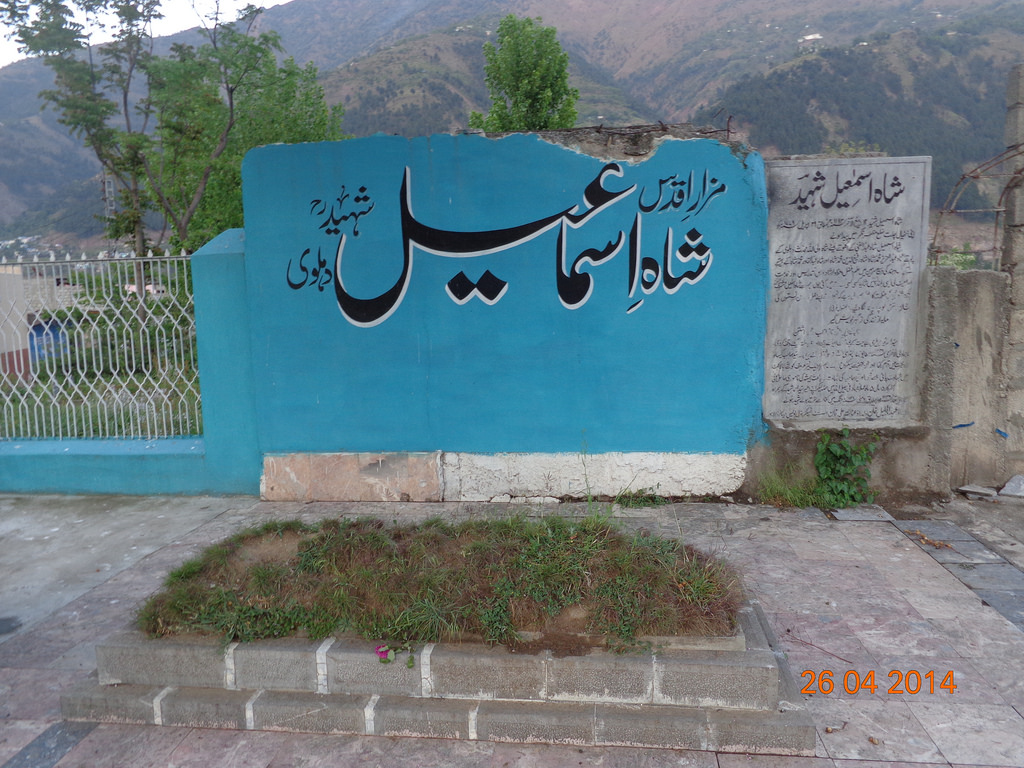
Grave of Shah Ismail in Balakot

The opponents of the movement of Syed Ahmad and Shah Isma’il labelled them as "Wahhabis", associating them with Muhammad Ibn 'Abd al-Wahhab's movement in Najd. Their followers, however, preferred the term Tariqah-i-Muhammadiyah (way of Muhammad) to describe themselves. The Tariqah-i-Muhammadiyah movement coupled their emphasis on the direct consultation of Scriptural texts with an aggressive campaign against shirk (polytheism) and bidat (heretical innovations), attacking practices they asserted that Indian Muslims had adopted from Hindus or Shias. While the rest of the Indian clergy had commonly differentiated between bidat-i-hasanah and bidat-i-sayyia (good and bad innovations), the Tariqah-i-Muhammadiyah criticised all forms of bidat, insisting that the Prophet’s own life and practices were the best guide for Muslims.

=== Amongst Sufis ===
Sufism was an integral part of the doctrine and practice of the Tariqah-i-Muhammadiyah movement. Although it was a sufistic resistance movement that campaigned against the encroachment of British colonial influence in the Indian subcontinent, Tariqah-i-Muhammadiyah was falsely labelled as "Wahhabi" by sectarian detractors and officials of the British East India Company regime. The movement’s supporters and leaders rejected such characterizations, firmly positioning themselves within the school of Shah Waliullah Dehlvi and the scholarly traditions of Madrasa-i-Rahimiyah and Madrasa Firangi Mahal.

Tariqah-i-Muhammadiyah movement gained prominence as an influential strand of the Naqshbandi-Mujaddidi order in the Indian subcontinent, and its revivalist teachings were widely adopted by the Indian Naqshbandis of that period. Syed Ahmad, the leader of Tariqah-i-Muhammadiyah, was a Sufi murshid deeply influenced by the Mujaddidi path of Ahmad Sirhindi and continued to initiate his disciples into the Naqshbandi, Qadiri, and Chishti orders. Sufi saints like Akhund Abdul Ghaffur who were active in the Tariqah-i-Muhammadiyah preached the teachings of Shah Waliullah Dehlvi among their Pashtun murids and imparted Sufi training to them, many of whom carried forward the struggle against the British after the battle of Balakot.

=== Amongst Ahl-i Hadith and Deobandis ===
The historical roots of Ahl-i Hadith, the puritanical reform movement that emerged in mid 19th-century India, is traced back to the jihad movement of Shah Isma’il and Syed Ahmad. Shah Isma’il's teachings on tawhid (monotheism), along with his condemnation of various folk rituals he regarded as shirk (polytheism), his denunciation of excessive celebrations during Mawlid as bid'ah (religious innovation), and his exercise of Ijtihad deeply influenced the Ahl-i Hadith. After the Islamic state of the mujahideen was destroyed by the Sikh Empire, a faction of Shah's followers, who described themselves as Ahl-i Hadith, subsequently travelled across the Indian subcontinent and began spreading aspects of his reformist teachings in a radical manner. This set the stage for the emergence of an organised form of Salafism in the subcontinent. By the early 20th century, Ahl-i Hadith had become an important religious movement all across South Asia. Major scholars and religious students of the Deobandi movement also refer to Shah Isma’il's treatises for theological guidance.

Deobandi scholars of the Hanafi school are profoundly influenced by the Hanafi centric juristic methodology of Shah Isma’il Dehlvi.

== Literary works ==
- Taqwiyat al-Iman (Strengthening of the Faith)
- Sirat al-Mustaqeem (Right Path)
- Aydhaaul Haq (Clarification of the Truth)

== Bibliography ==
- Altaf Qadir (2014). Sayyid Ahmad Barailvi: His Movement and Legacy from the Pukhtun Perspective. SAGE Publishing India. ISBN 978-93-5150-486-3. Archived
