= Expedition against the Hindustani mujahideen (1857–8) =

British Indian campaign in the Northwest Frontier (1857-1858)

Sittana Frontier Expeditions
- Part of Mujahidin movement and Sepoy Mutiny
Date	2nd July 1857 – 4 May 1858 (10 months and 2 days)
Location	Sheikh Jana · Naranji · Chinglai · Panjtar · Mangal Thana · Sittana
Result	Company victory

Belligerents
British Raj	Mujahideen

Commanders and leaders
Maj. Gen. Sydney Cotton	Maulvi Inayat Ali; Sayyid Mubarak Shah

In 1857–1858, the British Indian army sent an expedition against the Hindustani mujahideen (described in British sources as 'Hindustani fanatics'). The expedition in 1857–1858 also coincided with the 1857 Mutiny, as mutineers of the 55th Infantry had taken refuge and joined Sayyid Mubarak Shah, the son of Sayyid Akbar Shah of Hazara, who was associated with the Mujahidin movement of Sayyid Ahmed Barelvi as his former treasurer and counselor, and had been proclaimed the emir of Hazara and Swat.

== Background ==
After the death of Sayyid Ahmed Barelvi at Balakot in 1831, his followers (who came to be known as Hindustani mujahideen) sought refuge with Sadaat of Sittana near Buner. The British undertook First Black Mountain Expedition in 1852 against them and their Yousafzai allies, but could not subdue them. Sayyid Mubarak Shah raised an army for the purposes of jihad in Panjtar, but the instability of his rule meant that he could not venture far. The mutineers of the 55th Infantry joined Mubarak Shah, which increased his influence. Mubarak Shah borrowed a sum of money from a grey-haired jamadar of the rebels, but the sum was soon exhausted, and he was unable to pay them any further. At the same time, employment of the mutineers by Mubarak Shah was viewed as a threat by Saidu Baba, the religious leader of Swat, who expelled Mubarak Shah.

== Expedition ==
The Hindustani mujahideen were invited by a tribal chief Mubaraz Khan to the village of Chinglai. They were all dressed in white, while some of the leaders wore velvet cloaks, and were led by Maulvi Inayat Ali, a native of Patna. Inayat Ali's attacks were initially successful, and mujahideen occupied both Nawakilla and Sheikh Jana. The British expeditions included the Battle of Shekh Jana in July 1857, Battle of Naranji in August 1857, Battle of Chinglee in April 1858. The British again sent an expedition storming the heights of Mangal Thana, where they found a citadel built of large stone and fine timber to house a permanent and sizeable garrison. Finally, the battle of Sittana was fought at May 1858. The British reported that many of the Hindustani mujahideen from Rampur and Bengal were killed. The mujahideen who survived moved to the village of Malka.

== See also ==
- Ambela campaign
- First Black Mountain Expedition
