= Ambela campaign =

1863 British Indian frontier campaign

- Part of the Mujahidin movement
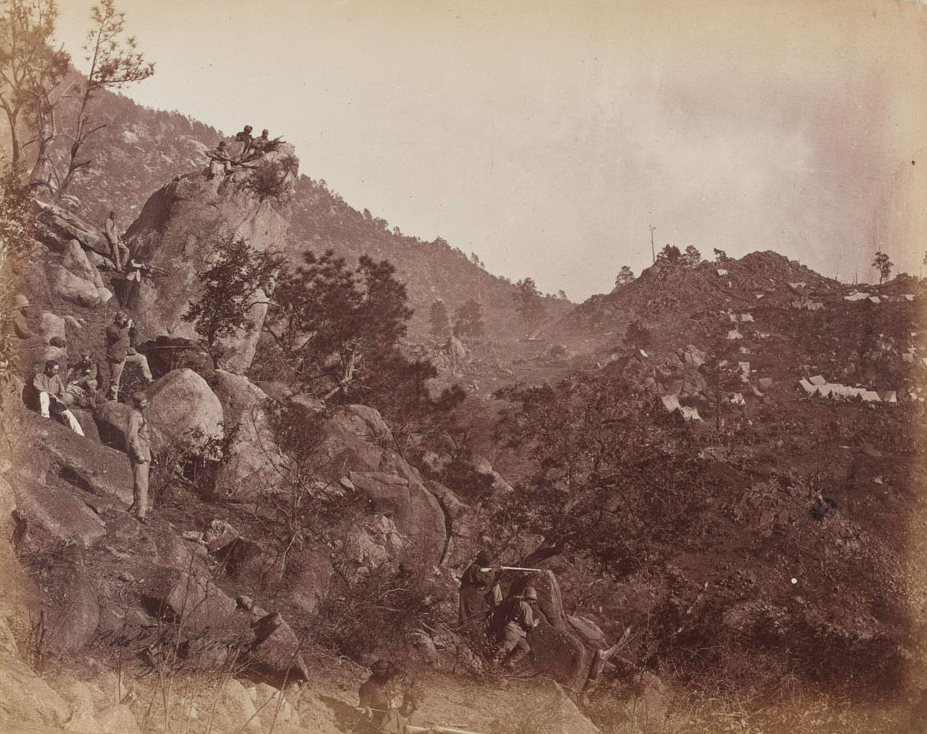
- A British picket and camp during the expedition
Date	1863–1864
Location	Ambela, Buner
Result	British Indian victory

Belligerents
(United Kingdom) British Empire: India	Mujahidin movement Yusufzai tribe

Commanders and leaders
Neville Chamberlain (WIA); John Garvock; John Davidson †; Henry Chapman †	Emir Abdullah Azīmabādi; Saidu Baba

Strength
6,000: reinforced by 4,800	15,000 men

Casualties and losses
3,000+ casualties including 1,000+ British	Unknown

The Ambela campaign (also spelt Umbeyla, Umbeylah, and Ambeyla) of 1863 was a campaign led by British Indian army against the remnants of Mujahidin movement of Syed Ahmad Barelvi, who were based at Malka at Buner and whom the British colonial authorities described as 'Hindustani fanatics'. They were supported by Pashtun tribes, notably Yousafzais, under Saidu Baba of Swat.

A force led by Neville Bowles Chamberlain planned to destroy Malka, the stronghold of Hindustani mujahideen. They set up an operational base in the Chamla Valley which could be reached via the Ambela Pass, but they were soon bogged down by a numerically superior local force, and were attacked by the mujahideen and Pashtun tribesmen. Reinforcements drafted in by the local Commander-in-Chief eventually pursued a diplomatic resolution. Colonial authorities approached the Bunerwals and various Khans and leaders to accept peace and allow them to destroy Malka in the territory of Buner. The expedition broke the power of the Hindustani mujahideen but resulted in the loss of 1,000 British casualties and an unknown number of Indian casualties.

== Background ==
Syed Ahmad Barelvi, a Muslim reformist from Raebareli, had declared jihad against the Sikh Empire in 1826 and had migrated with thousands of followers to the Peshawar Valley to establish an Islamic state, which he and his followers envisioned to be based on the ideals of first Muslim state in Medina. By 1830, Barelvi had managed to establish his rule in Peshawar after his success in the battle of Mayar, however, in the same year, many of his followers were assassinated by Pashtun tribesmen who disliked their presence as a 'foreign rule'. Barelvi eventually relocated to Balakot where he was killed while fighting against a Sikh army in 1831.

Following the death of Barelvi, many of his followers, who came to be known as Hindustani mujahideen, sought refuge with Saidu Baba at Sathana, the most influential religious figure on the frontier at the time. In 1858, an expedition led by Sir Sydney Cotton drove them from their base. By 1863, however, the Hindustani mujahideen had regrouped around the mountain outpost of Malka. Under the influence of Saidu Baba, they managed to receive aid of many of the neighbouring Pashtun tribes.

The Lieutenant-Governor of the Punjab authorised an expedition of 6,000 men under Brigadier General Neville Bowles Chamberlain to destroy Malka, the centre of mujahideen. The Lieutenant Governor acted without consulting the Commander-in-Chief of the Frontier Force. Chamberlain chose the Chamla Valley as his operational base and the Ambela Pass as the main access. He chose this valley as the access as he believed that the local Bunerwal people were friendly to British forces; this turned out to be a false impression as the Pashtuns had persuaded the Bunerwals that the British would annex their land if they failed to put up a defence.

== Expedition ==
The first Peshawar column reached the Ambela Pass on 20 October, after struggling on rough terrain, and the rear of the column took another two days to reach the base.

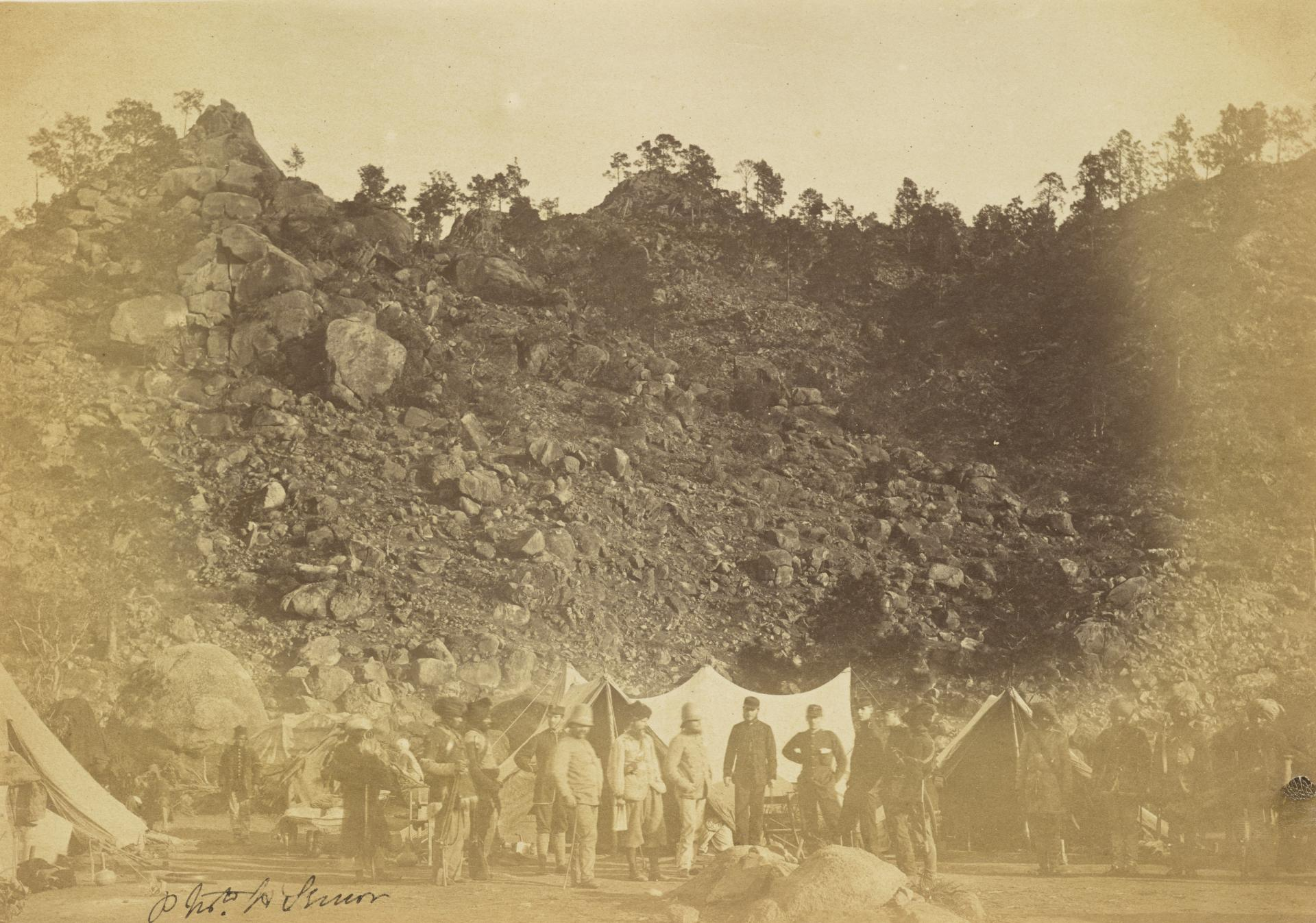
Photograph of Major Brown 101st, D. Tandy, Lt. Rawlins, Captain Garden and three Sikhs, Umbeyla Pass, India

On 22 October a reconnaissance was attacked by some Bunerwal tribesman. As a result, Chamberlain proceeded to fortify his position in the pass on two rocky outcrops, but Eagle's Nest and Crag Picket could only hold small numbers of men. The locals had amassed a force of some 15,000 consisting of mujahideen and Pashtuns under Saidu Baba. On 30 October Crag Picket was the scene of fierce hand-to-hand fighting that saw two Victoria Crosses awarded, to George Fosbery and Henry Pitcher. It fell to the Pashtuns three times in the next four weeks, but was retaken by British forces on each occasion. On 18 or 20 November, Chamberlain was seriously wounded whilst attempting to take Crag Picket. Due to the lowered British morale and high casualties, a repeat of the 1841 disaster at Kabul was feared so a decision was made to withdraw, but still refused by Chamberlain.

Reinforcements were gradually drafted in on the orders of Commander-in-Chief Sir Hugh Rose, who replaced Chamberlain with Major General John Garvock on 6 December.

Garvock led a two-column attack consisting of 4,800 men supported by the 11th Bengal Cavalry led by another VC Colonel Dighton Probyn VC that attempted break out of the pass. The rebels had also suffered heavily in the fighting around Crag Picket and loyalties were beginning to waver. The breakout was achieved on 15 December and a prominent position 'Conical Hill' which protected the approach was taken after another desperate fight and the Pashtuns retreated, ending the campaign.

== Aftermath ==
Umbeyla village was entered by the British on the following day and burned and an agreement reached with local khans that the latter would destroy the rebel stronghold at Malka. The Bunerwals settled for peace with Garvock and he sent a party to burn a mud house in Malka "for reasons of prestige". The British had restored peace and had broken the power of the Hindustani mujahideen but at the cost of 1,000 casualties and conditioned to withdraw from Buner.

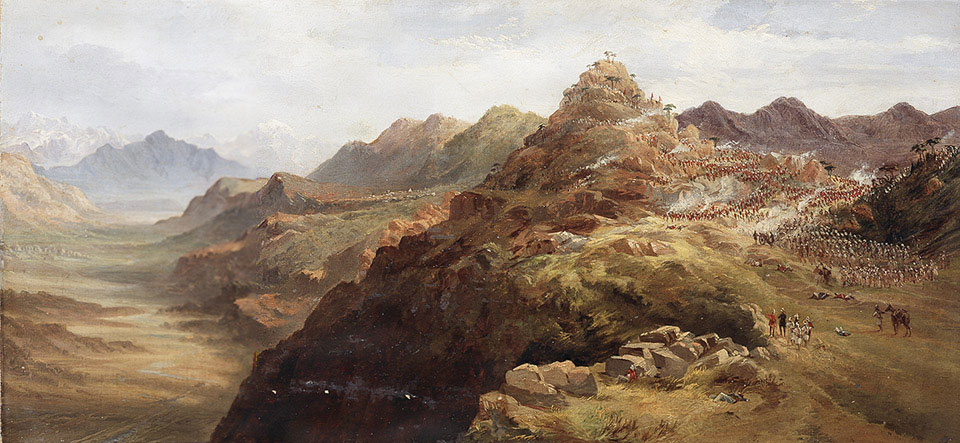
Oil canvas depicting the British Indian troops passing through the Ambela Pass

=== Expedition Timeline ===
- On 18 October 1863, General Chamberlain ordered movement of the troops through Surkawi or Ambela pass
- On 30 October, the Akhund of Swat and the mujahideen in a combined attack captured Crag picquet, the most important post for the colonial troops; after severe fighting it was retaken by the colonial troops.
- Due to the complexity of the situation, Sir Hugh Rose, the Commander-in-Chief of India, arrived at Lahore on 14 November 1863, and directed the expedition himself.
- On 20 November 1863, for the third and last time, Crag Picket was taken by the mujahideen and retaken by colonial troops. In this contest, General Chamberlain, commander of the colonial troops, was wounded and became unable to lead his force.
- On 10 December 1863, the Buner jirga arrived.
- On 14 December, in their final reply rejected the colonial British terms.
- Skirmishes continued on 15 and 16 December 1863.
- On 17 December 1863, the Buner jirga again arrived, accepted the terms, and returned after leaving their greater portion in the camp.
- The British party escorted by the tribal jirga advanced from Ambela on 19 December, and returned after the destruction of Malka on 23 December.
- The expedition, originally planned to take three weeks,took about three months, with high casualties on both sides.
