= Battle of Mayar =

1830, Peshawar, Pakistan

- Part of Jihad movement of Ahmad Barelvi
Date	October 1830
Location	Mayar, Peshawar Valley (present-day Mardan District, Pakistan)
Result	Mujahideen victory
Territorial changes	Capture of Peshawar by Ahmed Barelvi

Belligerents
Mujahideen	Barakzais (as the vassals of Sikh Empire)

Commanders and leaders
Syed Ahmad Barelvi; Shah Ismail Dehlvi	Sultan Mohammad Khan (surrendered)

Strength
3,000	12,000; 6 cannons

Casualties and losses
38	80

The Battle of Mayar was fought between the mujahideen led by Syed Ahmad Barelvi and the Barakzai forces led by Sardar Sultan Mohammad Khan, the Sikh-appointed governor of Peshawar, at Mayar in October 1830. The battle was a major victory for Tariqah-i-Muhammadiyah movement and resulted in the capture of Peshawar by mujahideen.

== Background ==
Syed Ahmad Barelvi was a Muslim reformer from Rai Bareli and a major figure of Tariqah-i-Muhammadiyah, an Islamic revivalist movement which sought to establish an Islamic state in South Asia. In order to achieve the objectives, he declared jihad against the Sikh Empire in 1826, and made Peshawar Valley as the centre of his movement. From start he had to face the opposition of both the Sikh armies and the local Pashtun tribesmen, who disliked the introduction of taxation and Barelvi's prohibition of certain Pashtun traditions considered un-Islamic by the movement. The most notable opponent of Barelvi's movement was Sultan Mohammad Khan, who had been tributary of Ranjit Singh since 1823. His betrayal to Ahmad Barelvi at the Battle of Shaidu (1827) cost the mujahideen 6,000 lives. In October 1830 Ahmad Barelvi decided to march against him to take over control of Peshawar.

== Battle ==
Syed Ahmad Barelvi left his cannons at Amb and marched with 3,000 mujahideen to Mayar, where he faced a much larger Barakzai force consisting of 12,000 men and 6 cannons. The battle started early in the morning and lasted for several hours. After a severe fight Sultan Mohammed Khan fled, leaving behind 80 dead. The mujahideen casualties at the battlefield were 28, with an additional 10 being killed in other places.

Following the battle, Ahmad Barelvi gathered 7,000 of his Hindustani mujahideen and local tribesmen and moved to Peshawar. After a long series of negotiations Sultan Mohammed Khan agreed to surrender control of the city to Barelvi. In return Barelvi maintained him as the governor on the condition of paying tribute, despite the protests by his close companions who considered Sultan Mohammad Khan as unreliable. Barelvi stayed at Peshawar for three weeks and after finalising affairs returned to Charsadda in November, leaving behind Maulvi Mazhar Ali Khan as his deputy. Now Barelvi was in the control of whole of Peshawar Valley as well as parts of Hazara, and took the title of khalifa.

== Aftermath ==
The Barelvi's decision to keep Sultan Mohammed Khan on his position proved to be a grave mistake as in November he planned a conspiracy against Barelvi's followers in Peshawar and elsewhere, resulting in the massacre and assassinations of hundreds of mujahideen. This incident caused Barelvi to lose hopes of establishing a foothold in Peshawar and he moved with the remaining mujahideen to Balakot, where he was killed fighting against the Sikh forces in the month of May next year.
