= Philip Thomas Buston =

British army general (1853–1938)

Brigadier-General Philip Thomas Buston CB DSO
- Buston as a young lieutenant
- Born: 1853; Twyford, Hampshire, United Kingdom
- Died: 21 June 1938 (aged 84–85); Whitchurch, Shropshire, Shropshire
- Military career
- Allegiance: United Kingdom
- Branch: British Army
- Service years: 12 September 1872 – 16 February 1910
- Rank: Brigadier-General
- Unit: Royal Engineers
- Conflicts: Second Anglo-Afghan War Hazara Expedition of 1891 Second Boer War
- Awards: Distinguished Service Order The Most Honourable Order of the Bath

Brigadier-General Philip Thomas Buston CB DSO (1853 – 21 June 1938) was a career officer of the Royal Engineers in the British Army, serving in India and South Africa during his long career.

== Early life ==
Philip Buston was born in 1853 in Twyford, Hampshire, to the Reverend Roger Buston and his wife Anne Mary Buston. He lived his childhood years in Vicarage House, Twyford with his parents and siblings.

== Military service ==
Buston was temporarily commissioned as a Lieutenant c. 12 September 1872, and on 28 September 1875 it was declared that his Commission among others would be made permanent, with pay backdated to the aforementioned date. The India Office and Burma Office List of 1877 accordingly has him listed as a Lieutenant attached to the Sappers and Miners of the Royal Engineers from 12 September 1872.

=== Second Anglo-Afghan War ===
He took part in the Second Anglo-Afghan War as part of the 7th Company of Sappers and Miners under the command of then-Brigadier General Thomas Durand Baker, and on 4 May 1880 he was mentioned in Despatches by then-Lieutenant-General Sir Frederick Roberts, on the advisement of Brigadier-General Baker.

As of 12 September 1884 Buston was promoted to captain.

On 10 April 1889 he was promoted to Brevet Major, and then to full Major rank on 26 January 1892.

=== Hazara Expedition ===
Buston was a part of the Hazara Expedition of 1891, and is mentioned again in Despatches written on 28 August 1891 by then-Major-General William Elles in regards to the operations of the Hazara Field Force, this time in some more detail, and with heavy praise - "The pontoon section of the Bengal Sappers and Miners was commanded by Major P. T. Buston, Royal Engineers, and it was entirely due to this officer's indomitable energy and perseverance that the standing and flying bridges were established exactly when required. It was no light task to bring up the heavy boats from Attock through shallows and over rapids, dangerous in many places, with very little loss of material and no loss of life, and his successful accomplishment of the task is worthy of all praise. The movements and communications of the force were entirely dependent on its constructive capacity in roadmaking.".

On 1 October 1899 Buston was further promoted to Lieutenant Colonel.

=== Second Boer War ===
In a letter dated 16 April 1901, Buston was once again mentioned in Despatches for a second time by the now Earl Roberts for meritorious service, and was further awarded the Distinguished Service Order on 19 April 1901.

=== Early 1900s ===
Following the Second Boer War, Buston was at some point between 1901 and 1904 made brevet colonel, and was placed on to half pay on 20 September 1904 following five years service as a regimental lieutenant colonel. This did not last long, however, as on 21 August 1905 Buston was brought off half pay, made a chief engineer at Aldershot Command and granted the full rank of colonel in the Army. Further honours were given on 29 June 1906, when Buston was made a Companion of the Order of the Bath, and on 5 October 1907, when he was made a temporary Brigadier-General for as long as he held the position of chief engineer. This position and temporary rank lasted until 21 August 1909, after which he was put on to the half-pay list, and then on to the retired pay list on 16 February 1910.

== Retired life ==
Two years after he retired, Buston was given an honorary promotion restoring his previously temporary rank of Brigadier General.

In 1915, during the First World War, Buston was involved in the opening and running of a Voluntary Aid Detachment hospital at Broughall Cottage, Whitchurch, and is mentioned by the War Office on 12 February 1918 in the London Gazette as having provided "very valuable" services during the course of the war.

Buston died on 21 June 1938, having resided at Tilstock Lodge, Tilstock, Whitchurch for his final years.
