= Saidu Baba =

Founder of Swāt state

Akhund Abdul Ghaffur Saidu Baba
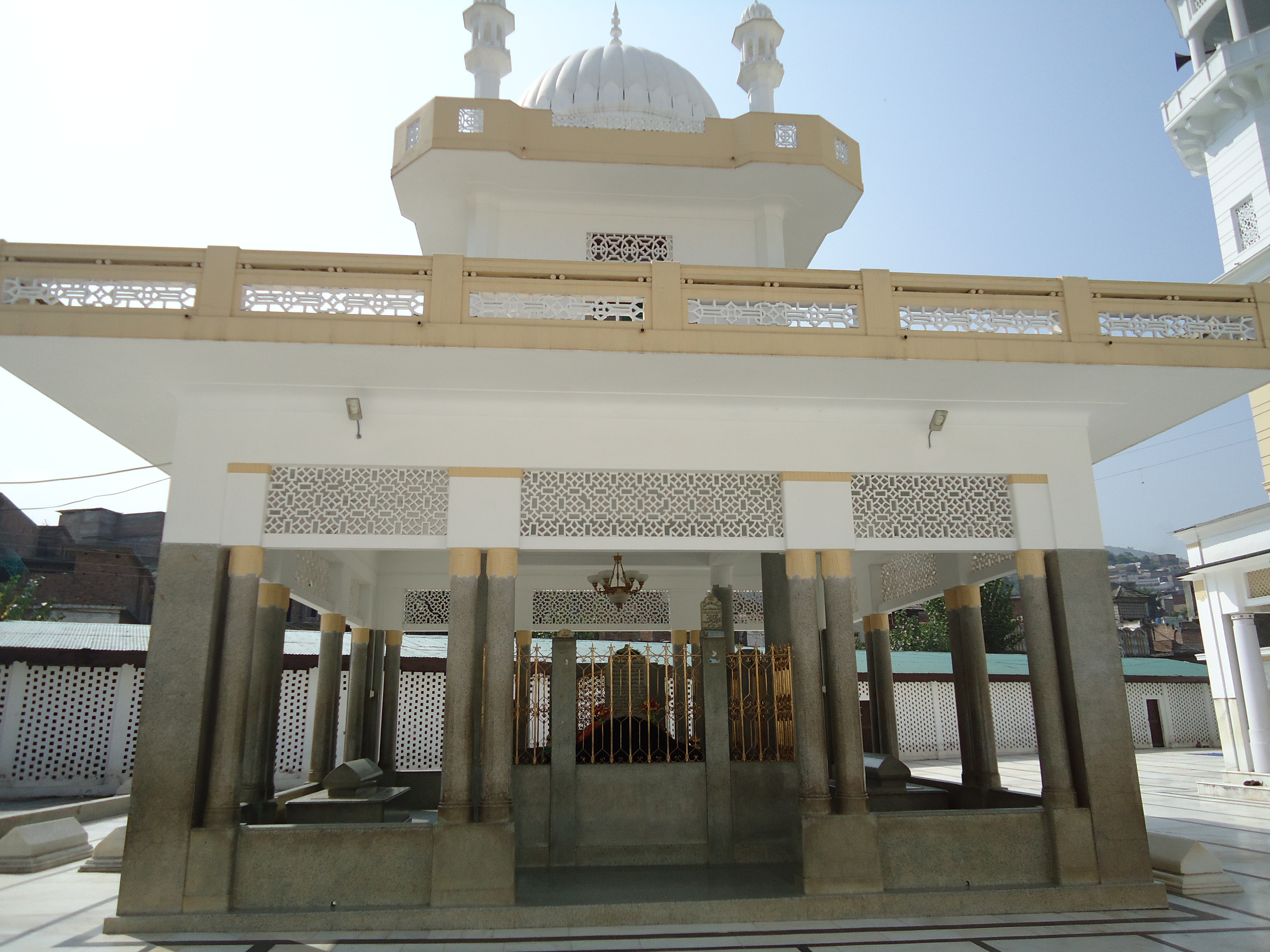
- Tomb of Saidu Baba

Personal life
- Born: 1794 Jabri, Matta, Upper Swat
- Died: 1876 (aged 81–82) Saidu Sharif
- Resting place: Saidu Sharif
- Known for: Founding the state of Swat

Religious life
- Religion: Islam
- Movement: Tariqah-i Muhammadiyah

Muslim leader
- Influenced by: Sayyid Ahmad Barelvi

Akhūnd Abdul Ghafūr (also known as Saidu Bābā and the Akhūnd of Swāt; 1794–1876) was a prominent religious saint from Swat. The city of Saidu Sharif, that serves as the administrative capital of Swat District, is named after him. His descendants, known as Mianguls, ruled over the princely state of Swat between 1917 and 1969.

== Early life ==
Akhund Abdul Ghaffur was born in a Muslim Gujar family of the upper Swat Valley in 1794. (Note: According to Akbar Ahmed early sources agree on the Gujar ancestry of Akhund of Swat. Some later sources attempted to establish his genealogy from the Safi tribe, as Gujars are not Pashtun. Same point of view has been expressed by the historian Sultan-i-Rum. For further details, see Ahmed (2012), pp. 93–94, Rum (1992), pp. 303–305 and Inam-ur-Rahim & Viaro (2002), p. 69.) Saidu Baba had devoted himself to the religious study as early as the age of 18.

== Religious education ==
For further spiritual study, Saidu Baba came to Peshawar and became a disciple of Hafiz Azim. After spending some time under guidance of Sufi saint Fazl Ahmad, he met another Sufi master Sho'ayb Tordher, who made him familiar with all four SufI orders: Naqshbandi, Qadiri, Chishti and Suhrawardi. After his death in 1819, Saidu Baba isolated himself in a cowshed in Hund by the banks of the Indus River, spending time in meditation and Zikr.

== Religious leadership ==
When Syed Ahmad Barelvi and his followers arrived in the Pashtun regions, Akhund Abdul Ghaffur became a strong supporter of their cause and became a close disciple of Sayyid Ahmad. Syed Ahmad initiated him into his 'Rah-e-Suluk-e-Nubuwat' Sufi tariqah, which was also known as 'Tariqah-e Muhammadiyah'. Saidu Babu shared his master's teachings to his mureeds, who then passed it to their next generation of disciples, thereby upholding the doctrines of Tariqah-e Muhammadiyah through a system of bay'ah through Sufi orders.

In 1829, Syed Ahmad Barelvi had the malik of Hund killed in Akhund's home, as he had betrayed the Mujahideen in the battles of Haidru and Shaidu against the Sikh Empire. After this incident, Akhund left his home and wandered across Swat, living life of asceticism. When Ahmad Barelvi died fighting in the battle of Balakot (1831) against the Sikhs along with hundreds of Mujahideen, many of his followers came to Buner to stay under the protection of Saidu Baba. They started a new uprising against the British Raj under Saidu Baba's leadership in 1862. He returned to Saidu Sharif in Swat in September, 1835 at the age of forty-one, where he attracted a large number of devotees. Afterwards, Saidu Baba became the most esteemed spiritual leader among the eastern Pashtuns.

== Establishment of Swat state ==
In 1835, Saidu Baba cooperated with the Afghan emir Dost Muhammad Khan and mobilized the tribes of Yaghestan against the Sikh Empire. In return, the Afghan Emir recognized him as ruler of Swat, Lundkhwar and Mardan. However, Dost Muhammad Khan's campaign proved to be a failure, and Akhund returned to Swat. In 1849, he appointed Syed Akbar Shah, a direct descendant of Pir Baba, as ruler of Swat. Syed Akbar had previously served under Syed Ahmad Barelvi as secretary. Saidu Baba ultimately assumed direct control of the state of Swat in the 1850s.

In 1863, Saidu Baba led the Yusufzai and other groups in a battle at the Ambela Pass against the British forces, inflicting a decisive defeat upon them in Swat.

== Death ==
When Saidu Baba died in 1876, the London newspapers published a brief note mentioning his death. The general public of London did not know anything about him or Swat, and this unfamiliarity prompted the poet Edward Lear to write a nonsensical poem titled "Who, or why, or which, or what, Is the Akond of Swat?", highlighting the "otherness" of the region to the English people.

== Literary allusions ==
- Edward Lear's "The Akond of Swat"
- George T. Lanigan (1846–1886) wrote "The Ahkoond of Swat" on hearing of Saidu Baba's death in 1878.
- Ken Nordine's rendition of the Lear piece in his 'Word Jazz' radio show.

== Eponymous entities ==
- Saidu Medical College
- Saidu Sharif
- Saidu Teaching Hospital
- Saidu Sharif Airport

== See also ==
- Mirzali Khan – Pashtun tribal leader (1897–1960)
- Akhund Darweza – Sufi and Islamic scholar (1533 - 1638)
- Pir Baba – Muslim Saint Sufi
- Pir Roshan – 16th-century Ormur Sufi poet
- Sartor Faqir – 19/20th-century Pashtun tribal leader; led a rebellion against British rule in South Asia
- Shah Mir – Sultan of Kashmir (1339–1342)
- Umra Khan – The Afghan Napoleon
