= Mujahidin movement (Tariqah-i-Muhammadiyah) =

Indian militant movement, 1826–1947

The Mujāhidīn movement (تحریکِ مجاہدین; Tehkrīk-i-mujahidīn), originally known as Tarīqah-i-Mūhammadiyāh (طریقهِ محمدیه, lit. 'the order of Muhammad'), also known as Tehrīk-e-Shahīdīn (تحریکِ شہیدین; lit. 'martyrs' movement'), and pejoratively by British colonial authorities as Wahhābī movement (وہابی تحریک), was an Islamic revivalist and anti-colonial militant movement primarily active in what would later become the North-West Frontier of British Raj, for over a century from 1826 until the independence of Pakistan in 1947.

Subsequent Islamic scholarly movements in the Indian subcontinent, notably the Deobandi and Ahl-i Hadith movements, were profoundly influenced by the spiritual and intellectual tradition of Tariqa-i-Muhammadiyah.

== Background ==
The Mujāhidīn movement traced its roots from the intellectual and theological works of Shah Waliullah Dehlawi and his son, Shah 'Abd al-Aziz. During the time in which the Muslim power in South Asia was in a state of absolute decline in the face of Maratha and later British ascendency, there was a general sense of unrest in the Muslim society. When the British armies entered Delhi in 1803, the Mughal dynast was turned into a protectorate of British East India Company which achieved political supremacy in the subcontinent. Upon this, Shah 'Abd al-Aziz issued a decisive fatwa declaring Hindustan to be Dar-al Harb (abode of war). It was the first significant fatwa against colonial rule in the subcontinent that gave an indirect call to South Asian Muslims to fight colonial occupation and liberate the country. Under these circumstances the call to jihad against British rule began becoming popular amongst the Muslim masses.

Shah Isma'il Dehlvi, the nephew of Shah 'Abd al-Aziz and grandson of Shah Waliullah, would lead a religious revivalist movement. In addition to being an excellent orator, he was also a soldier and military commander. Shah Muhammad Ishaq, the grandson of Shah 'Abd al-Aziz continued his religious reform after Abdul 'Aziz's death in 1823. Maulana Abdul Haie, son-in-law of Shah 'Abd al-Aziz was also a reputed scholar. These three theologians prepared the spadework of Tarīqah-i-Mūhammadiyāh, the reform movement that would be known as the Indian "Wahhābī movement". During his last years, Shah 'Abd al-Aziz gave his cloak to Syed Ahmed Barelvi appointing him as his successor. Sayyid Ahmed campaigned against the corruption of various Sufi orders, and initiated his disciples into Tarīqah-i-Mūhammadiyāh ("Muhammadiyya Order"). The disciples in this order were required to make a vow that they will strictly abide by Shari'a and would not follow anything not proven by Qur'an and Hadith.

In 1821, Syed Ahmad embarked on a journey for Hajj in Hejaz accompanied by Shah Ismail Dehlvi and Maulana Abdul Haie with 400 disciples. They performed Hajj in 1823 and stayed in Hejaz for 8 months. They returned home in 1824. The three scholars then charted a strategic plan to wage Jihad against the colonial occupation across India. Many parts of the subcontinent became recruitment centres for the mujahideen.

Upon return, Syed Ahmad regarded his immediate enemy to be the Sikh Empire ruled by Ranjit Singh, which was expanding close to Afghanistan. Syed Ahmad intended to establish a strong Islamic state on the North-West Frontier region, in the Peshawar Valley, and use it as a strategic base for launching military campaigns at a later stage against the British colonial regime. When the military action began, some Muslim Nawabs (like his former employer Amir Khan) provided funds but did not join Syed Ahmad for jihad. Around 8,000 mujahideen accompanied him, mostly consisting of clergymen and poor people. The rulers of the states of Tonk, Gwalior, and Sindh supported Syed Ahmad.

== Jihad of Syed Ahmed Barelvi (1826–1831) ==
Arriving in Peshawar Valley in late 1826, Syed Ahmad and his followers made their base in towns of Hund and Zaida in Swabi District. Syed Ahmad called upon the local Pashtun and Hazarewal tribes to wage jihad, and demanded that they renounce their tribal customs and adopt the Shari'a. The traditional khans were replaced by ulama (Islamic scholars) and a system of Islamic taxes was established to finance the movement. Soon after this evangelist campaign and the establishment of the Sharia system, jihad was declared. He sent an ultimatum to Ranjit Singh, demanding him to accept Islam, or pay jizyah, or to prepare for an open war, further mentioning that in the case of later, all of Yaghistan supported his movement.

On 21 December 1826, Syed Ahmad and his 1,500 followers clashed with 4,000 Sikh troops at Akora Khattak and obtained a significant victory. On 11 January 1827, allegiance was sworn on his hand and he was declared caliph and imam; Syed Ahmed was elected as Amir al-Mu'minin (commander of faithful) by religious scholars and tribal chiefs. Syed Ahmad's claim to khilafah was viewed with suspicion in the frontier region as well as in the clerical circles of northern India. When the Jumu'ah (Friday prayer) sermon was read in his name, symbolising his claim to power, the tribal chiefs became wary. According to prominent Pashtun sardars like Khadi Khan, maulvis were ill-equipped to run the affairs of a state. In response to the criticisms, Syed Ahmad asserted that his aim was not material but to lead a jihad against kuffar. In March 1827, mujahideen suffered a serious defeat against the Sikhs in the battle of Shaidu, worsening the position of Syed Ahmad.

Apart from the rebellious Pashtun chieftains, Syed Ahmad's Islamic political movement and state-building project also faced opposition from a rival Naqshbandi-Mujaddidi faction, led by Hafiz Daraz and Hafiz Muhammad ‘Azim, which was based in Peshawar. However, Sayyid Ahmad’s Mujaddidi credentials were well established, as he was a descendant of a prominent Mujaddidi saint. He was raised in the Mujaddidi spiritual tradition in India, and was a disciple of the prominent Sufi scholar Shah Abdul Aziz Dehlavi. Tariqa-i Muhammadiyah movement had emerged as an influential strand of the Naqshbandi-Mujaddidi order in the Indian subcontinent, and its revivalist teachings gained widespread acceptance among the Indian Naqshbandis of that period. To Sayyid Ahmad's followers, his political and spiritual leadership was firmly based in the Sufi master-disciple tradition.

On 24 February 1828, one of the three leaders of Jihad, Maulvi Abdul Haei, the chief advisor to Syed Ahmed died as an old and ailing person. In his letters to Sikh ruler Ranjit Singh, Syed Ahmed clarified that he did not seek a confrontation with Sikhs, but only their help in defeating the British. Ranjit Singh, for his part, respected Syed Ahmed as a "courageous, bold and determined person".

In addition to his Islamic social agenda, Syed Ahmad also enforced collection of ushr (an Islamic tithe), amounting to 10% of crop yields. This policy was faced with fierce opposition from an alliance of local Pashtun tribesmen, who briefly managed to occupy Peshawar. The alliance was defeated and the Islamic reformers finally re-captured Peshawar. After the conquest of Peshawar by the mujahideen, Syed Ahmad announced the abolition of all tribal rituals that he regarded as bid'ah (religious innovations). He abolished various practices such as: the bride being paid a regular price for marriage; the widowed of the deceased Muslims being divided among his heirs; practice of more than four marriages; denial of inheritance to women; clan wars being considered like jihad and its plunder being considered as booty. He also pushed for aggressive and violent policies to enforce Shari'a. These included: allowing brides as long as half of the agreed money was given; young girls eligible for marriage should be married immediately; flogging people who did not pray. Over several months during 1830, Sayyed Ahmad tried to reconcile between established power hierarchies. But before the end of 1830, another organized uprising occurred, and Syed Ahmad's soldiers in Peshawar and surrounding villages were murdered and the movement was forced to retreat to the hills.

Disillusioned by this, Syed Ahmed reportedly lost interest in the movement and made plans to migrate to Arabia. However, senior advisors such as Shah Ismail opposed the idea and sought to complete the objectives of the movement, despite the setbacks.

On 17 April 1831, Syed Ahmed set out on his last journey for Balakot with the aim to capture Kashmir, accompanied by Shah Ismail. A Pashtun chieftain named Zabardast Khan who made a secret deal with the Sikh commander Sher Singh withheld promised reinforcements. On 6 May 1831, an army of 500 to 700 mujahideen faced a strong force of 12,000 Sikh soldiers led by Sher Singh. On that day Syed Ahmed, Shah Ismail and prominent leaders of the mujahidin movement fell fighting in the battlefield. Sikh victory at Balakot arose jubilation in Lahore. The defeat at Balakot made a devastating blow to the movement.

== Later Sikh period (1831–1849) ==
After the death of Syed Ahmed Barelvi, many of his followers sought refuge with the Sadaat of Sittana (also spelt Sathana) and Kaghan Valley. Maulvi Wali Muhammad was appointed next emir. In 1840, Syed Nasīr ud-Din, an old companion of Syed Ahmed, arrived at Sittana from Delhi, and was elected by the remaining mujahideen. However, he was poisoned a few months later by the Pashtun khans. He was succeeded by Syed Abdur Rahīm, who remained as emir until June 1841. In that year, two members of the influential religious Azīmabādi family of Patna, Maulvi Inayat Ali and Maulvi Walayat Ali, arrived at Sittana. Maulvi Inayat Ali was elected emir. By this time, Ranjit Singh was dead and Sikhs were in a state of civil war. Maulvi Inayat Ali conquered Kaghan Valley and much of Hazara including Balakot with the help of Sadaat of Kaghan by 1843. Shari'a was enforced and diplomatic relations were established with neighbouring Muslim khanates. In 1846, Maulvi Walayat Ali was appointed emir but soon the caliphate established by the mujahideen was dissolved in the wake of a joint Anglo-Sikh expedition. On 5 November 1852, Maulvi Walayat Ali died at Sittana and Maulvi Inayat Ali was reappointed.

== British colonial period: First phase (1849–1902) ==
In 1852, British undertook first campaign against the mujahideen, whom they described as Hindustani Fanatics; they themselves used various names including Jamiyyat-i Hizbullah (جمیعتِ حزب الله), Hindustani Mujahidin (ہندوستانی مجاہدین) and more frequently, Jamaat-i Mujahidin (جماعتِ مجاہدین). In the First Black Mountain Expedition the mujahideen stronghold at Kotla was destroyed. The forces of Amb under Jahandad Khan aided British by cutting off passage of mujahideen and killing over thirty of them, out of a total strength of two to three hundreds.

Maulvi Inayat Ali toured neighbouring areas, especially Swat, where Syed Akbar Shah of Sittana had been elected emir, although the real authority lay with the Akhund of Swat. In April 1854, mujahideen relocated to Mangal Tanra (or Mangal Thana), in Buner. The mujahideen came into repeated conflicts with both British and Pashtun tribesmen. In 1858, another British Indian expedition was sent against the mujahideen. Mujahideen offered resistance but fifty of them lost lives, and centres of Mangal Tanra and Sittana were destroyed by the British army.

After destruction of previous strongholds, mujahideen made Malka their new centre in 1858. That year, Maulvi Inayat Ali died and was succeeded by a triumvirate of Maulvi Nurullah, Ikramullah and Muhammad Taqi, until Maulvi Maqsud Ali arrived and became emir in 1860. He died two years later and was succeeded by Maulvi Abdullah, the son of Maulvi Walayat Ali. He completely reorganized the mujahideen.

In 1863, mujahideen along with a number of Pashtun tribes under leadership of Akhund of Swat rose against colonial rule. The British Indian army undertook the famous Ambela campaign against mujahideen who numbered 500 to 700, as well as thousands of Pashtun tribesmen. The British Indian troops suffered a thousand casualties. Finally, the British government reached agreement with Pashtun khans to oust mujahideen from Malka, which was destroyed, and expedition came to the end.

After losing Malka, mujahideen relocated to several places before finally settling at Judba in 1866. During this period they also suffered losses in the clashes with Akhund of Swat who had reached an agreement with British government. After the Second Black Mountain Expedition in 1868, mujahideen were forced to relocate once again by the Hasanzai tribe in compliance with the treaty with British government, and moving through Palosai and Thakot finally settled at Buner in 1882, and built a mud fort there. By this time, mujahideen comprised some 600 fighting men, divided into three groups of Punjabis, Bengalis and Hindustanis.

Throughout 1860s and 1870s, British conducted a series of high profile trials of the sympathisers of movement across British India, in what came to be known as "Wahhabi Trials", executing and exiling many of the accused to Kālā Pānī in Andaman Islands. In 1871, John Norman, the chief justice of Calcutta High Court, was assassinated by a "Wahhabi" Mohammad Abdullah, for the harsh penalties he had handed down during the trials.

In 1888, mujahideen again clashed with British Indian army during the Third Black Mountain Expedition. They numbered about 600 to 700 but only a hundred took part in campaign. They suffered 48 casualties and lost their centre of Maidan once again. This was fifth time that mujahideen had come into conflict with British Indian government, each time being forced to relocate their centre.

In the Fourth Black Mountain Expedition of 1891, mujahideen attacked British at Ghazikot along with Jadoons, and suffered over 22 casualties. In the aftermath, Hasanzai and Akazai tribes signed agreement with British against mujahideen. Afterwards Maulvi Abdullah sought aid from Malak Ghulam of Mubarakkhail, who granted mujahideen refuge in the villages of Nagrai, Tilwai and Khundai. In 1895, mujahideen shifted their families to Chirurai.

In the Great Frontier Rebellion of 1897, mujahideen attacked the British troops, although their exact role and participation remain uncertain. Due to the repeated pattern of Pashtun tribesmen willing to compromise with British against mujahideen, they had become more cautious in joining tribal uprisings. The Asmast Markaz (also known as Asmas and Smast) was established in 1898, at the tri-junction of Buner, Hazara and Swabi, which remained primary headquarters of mujahideen until 1947.

In 1902/3, Maulvi Abdullah died and was succeeded by his son Abd al-Quddus.

== British colonial period: Second phase (1902–1947) ==
After a short period, Maulvi Abdullah Karīm, the brother of Maulvi Abdullah, was elected emir. His tenure remained uneventful. He died in 1915 and was succeeded by Nematullah, the grandson of Maulvi Abdullah as emir. In the same year, people of Buner rose in rebellion under the leadership of Haji Sahib of Tarangzai, with mujahideen under Maulvi Muhammad Bashīr also fighting alongside them. Three to four hundred mujahideen participated in the uprisings; twelve mujahideen lost their lives at Ambela Pass fighting against British. In 1915, another centre was established at Chamarkand in Bajaur. At Chamarkand, Maulvi Abdul Karīm Qanaūji, a son of Maulvi Inayat Ali, was elected emir in 1915. The Chamarkand mujahideen (مجاہدینِ چمرکند) participated in the Mohmand campaign of 1916.

During this period, the mujahideen of Yaghistan (مجاہدینِ یاغستان) contacted Maulana Mahmud Hasan Deobandi for financial and political help, who dispatched Ubaidullah Sindhi to secure it for them from Afghanistan.

Emir Nematullah entered into a peace agreement with the British colonial government in 1917, which resulted in the conflict among mujahideen, and a group which was in favour of continued hostility with British Indian government broke away and established themselves at Chamarkand. The Chamarkand mujahideen were mainly Punjabis as opposed to Asmast Markaz mujahideen, who were mostly Hindustanis and Bengalis. They secured financial and military help from Afghanistan as well. Over fifty Chamarkand mujahideen fought in the Third Anglo-Afghan War against the British in 1919.

Maulvi Nematullah was assassinated in 1921 and was succeeded by Maulvi Rehmatullah, another grandson of Maulvi Abdullah, who remained emir of the remaining mujahideen at Asmast, until his death in 1957. He also participated in the First Kashmir War.

Maulvi Abdul Karīm was succeeded on 5 February 1921 by Maulvi Fazl Illahi Wazirabadi. Wazirabadi remained on his position until 1926, when the two groups of Asmast and Chamarkand again united. Maulvi Muhammad Bashīr was appointed emir at Chamarkand, remaining so until his assassination in 1934. He was succeeded by Maulvi Mauz of Gujranwala as emir of Chamarkand, followed by Maulvi Abdul Majid in 1936. The mujahideen also participated in the 1935 Mohmand campaign. By this time the total strength of mujahideen at both centres was 230.

Many of mujahideen, including Wazirabadi, fought in the rebellion of Faqir of Ipi in Waziristan in late 1930s to early 1940s.

Throughout colonial period mujahideen continued to receive financial aid and recruits from British India, notably from Bengal, Bihar and Punjab. In one notable instance, fourteen students from the law and medical colleges of Lahore joined the Chamarkand mujahideen in 1915. (Note: Eight from Government College, Lahore, four from King Edwards Medical College, Lahore, and one each from Aitchison Chief College, Lahore and Islamia College, Lahore.) The attitude of both centres (Chamarkand and Asmast) towards British government was divided, with later being more conciliatory while the former remained hostile. Hence, the Chamarkand mujahideen faced prosecution across British India.
