= First Black Mountain Expedition =

British Indian military expedition to Torghar (1850)

- Part of Mujahidin movement
Date	February – November 1852
Location	Kala Dhaka (present-day Torghar, Khyber Pakhtunkhwa, Pakistan)
Result	British victory

Belligerents
British Raj	Hindustani mujahideen Black Mountain tribesmen

Commanders and leaders
Lt. Col. Frederick Mackeson	Unknown

Strength
2,400 Soldiers; 1,400 Native Militia; 17 Cannons	Several thousand

Casualties and losses
5 Killed, 10 Wounded	Unknown

The First Black Mountain Expedition was a 1852–1853 British Indian military expedition to Kala Dhaka (Black Mountain) in the erstwhile Punjab Province (in what is now Khyber Pakhtunkhwa, Pakistan), directed against the Black Mountain tribes and the Hindustani mujahideen associated with the Mujahidin movement of Syed Ahmed Barelvi (whom the British sources described as 'Hindustani fanatics').

== Expedition ==
The war began when two British customs officers were killed by tribesmen. The First Black Mountain Expedition according to contemporary sources revealed the cause of the seemingly systematic nature of the revolt, as the British first discovered the 'Hindustani fanatics', who had caused the failure of the negotiations between the locals and the authorities.

== See also ==
- Second Black Mountain Expedition
- Third Black Mountain Expedition or the Hazara Expedition of 1888
