= India General Service Medal (1854) =

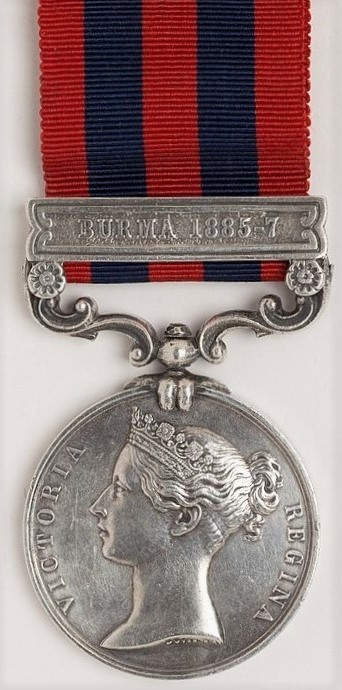
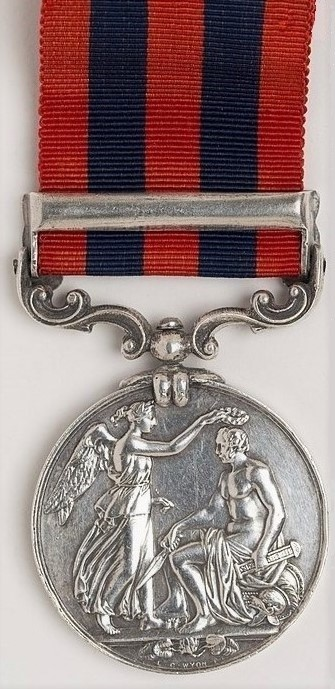
- Obverse and reverse of the medal.
- Type: Campaign medal
- Awarded for: Campaign service.
- Description: Silver or bronze disk, 36mm diameter.
- Presented by: United Kingdom of Great Britain and Ireland
- Eligibility: British and Indian forces.
- Campaign(s): India 1852–1895.
- Clasps: Pegu; Persia; North West Frontier; Umbeyla; Bhootan; Looshai; Perak; Jowaki 1877–78; Naga 1879–80; Burma 1885–7; Sikkim 1888; Hazara 1888; Burma 1887–89; Burma 1887–9; Chin Lushai 1889–90; Lushai 1889–92; Samana 1891; Hazara 1891; NE Frontier 1891; Hunza 1891; Burma 1889–92; Chin Hills 1892–93; Kachin Hills 1892–93; Waziristan 1894–95
- Established: 11 March 1854
- Ribbon: 32mm, three crimson and two dark blue stripes of equal width.

The India General Service Medal (1854 IGSM) was a campaign medal approved on 1 March 1854, for issue to officers and men of the British and Indian armies. It was awarded for various minor military campaigns in India and nearby countries, between 1852 and 1895.

In 1852 Lord Dalhousie had suggested a general service medal for smaller Indian campaigns, in order to limit the number of individual medals awarded.

Indian Army units made up the majority of forces present for nearly all campaigns. While the expeditions covered by the medal included few formal battles, most were undertaken in difficult terrain against determined resistance from local tribesmen.

In 1895, the India Medal was authorised to reflect service in further Indian expeditions, replacing the 1854 General Service Medal.

== Appearance ==
The medal is 1.4 inches (36 mm) in diameter, and was struck at the Royal Mint.
It was initially awarded only in silver. From the Burma 1885–87 clasp, medals in bronze were awarded to authorised native followers who accompanied the troops, such as bearers, sweepers and drivers.

The obverse bears a left facing effigy of Queen Victoria wearing a diadem. Surrounding the head is the inscription VICTORIA REGINA.
The reverse depicts Victory crowning a seated warrior with a laurel wreath. In the exergue are lotus flowers and leaves.
It was always issued with the recipient's rank, name and unit engraved or impressed on the rim.
The medal is suspended by a scrolled bar.

The 1.25 inches (32 mm) wide ribbon is divided into five stripes, three red and two dark blue, each 0.25 inches (6.4 mm) wide.

== Clasps ==
A total of 24 clasps were awarded for 23 campaigns with 55 qualifying actions. Those who qualified for a second or subsequent clasp received the new clasp only, to be attached to their existing medal. The medal was never issued without a clasp, with the maximum number known to be awarded to one individual being seven.
The following clasps were issued:

- Pegu (2nd Burmese War, 1852–53)
- Persia (Persian War, 1856–57)
- North West Frontier (Various small expeditions, 1849–68)
- Umbeyla (N. W. Frontier, 1863)
- Bhootan (Bhutan War, 1864–66)
- Looshai (N. E. India, 1871–72)
- Perak (Malayan coast, 1875–76)
- Jowaki 1877–78 (N. W. Frontier)
- Naga 1879–80 (N. W. Burma)
- Burma 1885–7 (3rd Burmese War).
- Sikkim 1888 (N. E. India)
- Hazara 1888 (Black Mountain Expedition, N. W. Frontier)
- Burma 1887–89 (Some clasps inscribed Burma 1887–9)
- Chin Lushai 1889–90 (India-Burma border)
- Lushai 1889–92 (India-Burma border)
- Samana 1891 (Miranzai Expedition, N. W. Frontier)
- Hazara 1891 (2nd Black Mountain Expedition, N. W. Frontier)
- NE Frontier 1891 (Manipur, India-Burma border)
- Hunza 1891 (Northern Frontier)
- Burma 1889–92 (Small local operations)
- Chin Hills 1892–93 (N. W. Burma)
- Kachin Hills 1892–93 (Northern Burma)
- Waziristan 1894–95 (N. W. Frontier)

After the first phase of the Second Afghan War in May 1879, it was proposed that the India General Service Medal be issued with clasps for Afghanistan, Ali Musjid and Peiwar Kotal. However then the war recommenced in September 1879, it was decided to award a distinct Afghanistan Medal instead to cover the whole Afghan War.

== Bibliography ==
- Collett, D.W, Medals Yearbook, (1981)
- Dorling, H. Taprell, Ribbons and Medals, (1956), A. H. Baldwin & Son
- Joslin, Litherland, and Simpkin (eds), British Battles and Medals, (1988), Spink ISBN 0907605257
- Mayo, John Horsley. Medals and Decorations of the British Army and Navy, Volume 2, (1897). A. Constable & Co
- Mussel, J et al. (eds), Medals Yearbook, (2016), Token Publishing, ISBN 9781908828248
