= William Galbraith (British Army officer) =

British Army general

Major-General Sir William Galbraith KCB
- Born: 14 May 1837; Ireland
- Died: 15 October 1906 (aged 69); Fulham, London
- Military career
- Allegiance: United Kingdom
- Branch: British Army
- Rank: Major-General
- Conflicts: Second Anglo-Afghan War
- Awards: Knight Commander of the Order of the Bath

Major-General Sir William Galbraith KCB (14 May 1837 – 15 October 1906) was a British Army officer who served as Adjutant-General in India.

== Early life and education ==
Galbraith was born in Ireland, the son of the Rev. John Galbraith, rector of Tuam, and his wife, Sarah. He was educated at Trinity College, Dublin.

== Military career ==
Galbraith was commissioned into the 85th Regiment of Foot on 1 June 1855. He became assistant adjutant-general in Koorum District of India and, in that capacity, saw action at the Battle of Peiwar Kotal in November 1878 during the Second Anglo-Afghan War. He also took part in operations in the Hariab and Khost Valleys. He became military commander in Saugor in January 1887 and took part in the Hazara Expedition of 1888. He went on to be General Officer Commanding Sirhind District in November 1888, Adjutant-General in India in October 1890 and General Officer Commanding Quetta District in April 1895.

== Personal life ==
In 1896, he married Helen Mary Handcock, daughter of Lieutenant-General Arthur Gore Handcock, CB, with whom he had two sons, both born in British India. Their eldest son, Lieutenant Arthur Hugh Courtney Galbraith (1897–1918), was killed in action in the First World War. Their younger son, Major Ian William Galbraith MC (1899–1939), married Mary Florence Baker, daughter of Rear-Admiral Julian Alleyne Baker and sister of biologist John Randal Baker. They both drowned on 14 June 1939, when their canoe capsized in the Indus River near Gilgit, British India, where he was the Political Agent. Ian was awarded the Military Cross in 1917 and the Albert Medal for Lifesaving in 1921.

Military offices
Preceded by William Elles	Adjutant-General, India; 1890–1895	Succeeded by Gerald Morton
