= Allaiwal =

Tribal Clans in Pakistan

The Allaiwal is a tribal terminology used for the different clans belonging to the Swati people which inhabits Allai, the lands north of Nandhiar (Batagram) and south of Kohistan - in Pakistan. In the 19th century they under the leadership of Arsala Khan Bebal Swati and his successors fought battles against the British with the Hazara Expedition of 1888 resulting in the destruction of the important Allaiwal village of Pokal on 3 November 1888.
