= Gerald Morton =

Lieutenant-General Sir Gerald Morton KCIE CB CVO
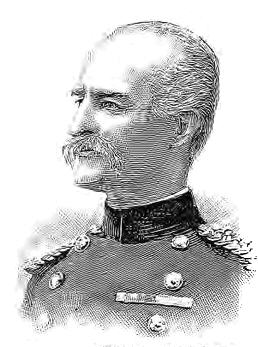
- Born: 7 February 1845
- Died: 20 April 1906 (aged 61)
- Military career
- Allegiance: United Kingdom
- Branch: British Army
- Service years: 1863–1906
- Rank: Lieutenant-General
- Commands: Lahore District; 7th Infantry Division
- Conflicts: Second Anglo-Afghan War
- Awards: Knight Commander of the Order of the Indian Empire; Commander of the Royal Victorian Order; Companion of the Order of the Bath

Lieutenant-General Sir Gerald De Courcy Morton KCIE CB CVO (7 February 1845 – 20 April 1906) was a British Army officer who became General Officer Commanding 7th Division.

== Military career ==
Morton was commissioned into the 6th Regiment of Foot in 1863. He served in Hazara in 1868 and fought in the Second Anglo-Afghan War before being appointed Adjutant-General in India in 1895 and becoming General Officer Commanding Lahore District in 1898. In December 1898, he was made a Knights Commander of India (KCIE). In January 1902 he was appointed a Major-General on the Staff to command the Dublin district, and six months later, on 23 June 1902, he was appointed General Officer Commanding 7th Division.

He was promoted to lieutenant general on 3 April 1905 and died in command of his division at Curragh Camp in 1906.

Military offices
Preceded by William Galbraith	Adjutant-General, India; 1895–1898	Succeeded by Sir William Nicholson
