= Hazara Expedition of 1888 =

British Indian frontier campaign (1888)

- Part of the Mujahidin movement
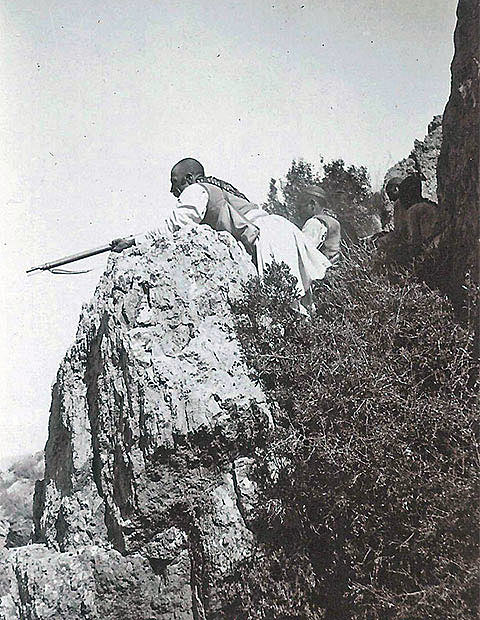
Date	October 1888 – November 1888
Location	Hazara (modern-day Pakistan)
Result	British victory

Belligerents
British Empire: British Raj	Mujahidin; Pariari Sayyids (Swatis); Tikariwals (Swatis); Nandiharis (Swatis); Allaiwals (Swatis); Thakotis (Swatis); Hassanzai (Yousafzai); Akazai (Yousafzai) Gujjars

Commanders and leaders
Brigadier-General J.W. McQueen CB	Emir Abdullah Azīmabādi; Khan Arsala Khan Bebal Swathi (Malik of Allaiwals); Khan Abdul Qadir Khan Arghushal Swathi (Malik of Thakot)

Strength
9,416 British and Indian troops	Around 10,000; 6,500 Swathis; 2,000 Hassanzais; 1,500 Akazais; 100 Mujahidin

Casualties and losses
2 officers 23 soldiers 54 wounded	Around 400: 48 Mujahidin

The Hazara Expedition of 1888, also known as the Third Black Mountain Expedition or the First Hazara Expedition, was a military campaign by the British against Swati and Yousafzai tribes of Kala Dhaka and Battagram (then known as the Black Mountains of Hazara and northern areas around it) in the Hazara region of what is now Pakistan. Over a hundred mujahideen also fought in the campaign.

== Background ==
On 18 June 1888, two British officers and four Gurkha soldiers were killed in an altercation between British reconnaissance patrols and antagonistic tribes. As a response, the Hazara Field Force was assembled and began its march on 4 October 1888, after an ultimatum had not been satisfied by the tribes by October 2, 1888.

== Expedition ==
The first phase of the campaign targeted Yousafzai tribe of Black mountain such as Hassanzais and Akazais and ended with the Hassanzai and Akazai tribes requesting an armistice on October 19, 1888.

The second phase of the campaign targeted the Swati tribe that lived north of Black Mountain such as the Allaiwals, Thakotis, Parari Sayyids and the Tikariwals. The campaign ended when the Allaiwal village of Pokal was occupied and destroyed by the British on November 2 and 3, 1888 and Swatis tribal chief Arsala Khan Swathi temporary left his capital village Pokal without surrendering to British.

In 1888, mujahideen again clashed with British Indian army. They numbered about 600 to 700 but only a hundred took part in campaign. They suffered 48 casualties and lost their centre of Maidan once again. This was fifth time that mujahideen had come into conflict with British Indian government, each time being forced to change their centre.

The then Commander in Chief in India General Sir Frederick Roberts viewed the Black Mountain Expedition as:

a success from a military point of view, but … the determination of the Punjab Government to limit the sphere of action of the troops, and to hurry out of the country, prevented our reaping any political advantage. We lost a grand opportunity for gaining control over this lawless and troublesome district; no survey was made, no roads opened out, the tribesmen were not made to feel our power, and, consequently, very soon another costly expedition had to be undertaken.

The failure of the tribes to honour the agreements that ended the 1888 campaign would lead to a further two-month expedition by a Hazara Field Force in 1891, as part of the Second Hazara Expedition.

British and Indian Army forces who took part in these expeditions received the India General Service Medal with the clasps Hazara 1888 and Hazara 1891 respectively.

Subedar Kishanbir Nagarkoti of the 5th Gurkha Rifles received his fourth and final Indian Order of Merit for gallantry in the 1888 expedition.

== See also ==
- First Black Mountain Expedition
- Second Black Mountain Expedition
- Fourth Black Mountain Expedition
