= William Elles =

Lieutenant-General Sir William Elles KCB
- Born: 5 May 1837; Bournemouth, Hampshire
- Died: 5 August 1896 (aged 59) Nainital, India
- Allegiance: United Kingdom
- Branch: British Army
- Service years: 1854–1896
- Rank: Lieutenant-General
- Commands: Bengal Command
- Conflicts: Crimean War; Indian Mutiny; Third Anglo-Burmese War
- Awards: Knight Commander of the Order of the Bath

Lieutenant-General Sir William Kidston Elles KCB (5 May 1837 – 5 August 1896) was a British Army officer.

== Early life and education ==
William Kidston Elles was the son of Malcolm J. Elles. He was educated at Sandhurst.

== Military career ==
Elles was commissioned as an ensign in the 38th Regiment of Foot in June 1854. He served with the Regiment at the siege of Sebastopol in 1855 during the Crimean War and then during the Indian Mutiny in 1857. He also served in the Hazara campaign of 1868 and then became Deputy Assistant Quarter Master General with the Intelligence Branch in 1877, Assistant Adjutant General at Horse Guards in 1881 and a brigade commander with the Madras Army in 1885. After taking part in the Third Anglo-Burmese War in 1885, he became Adjutant-General, India in 1889 and then commanded the Hazara Expedition in 1891. He also served as A.D.C. to Queen Victoria from 1881-90. He went on to be Commander-in-Chief Bengal Command in April 1895 before dying in office from cholera in August 1896.

There is a memorial to him at Christ Church in Shimla.

Military offices
Preceded by Thomas Baker	Adjutant-General, India; 1887–1890	Succeeded by William Galbraith
Preceded by New Post	C-in-C, Bengal Command; 1895–1896	Succeeded by Sir Baker Russell
