= Battle of Haidru (1828) =

Historical conflict

- Part of Syed Ahmad's Holy War
Date	1828
Location	Haidru, Punjab, Pakistan
Result	Sikh victory

Belligerents
Sikh Empire	Mujahideen

Commanders and leaders
Hari Singh	Syed Ahmad

Strength
20,000	50,000 Afghans

Casualties and losses
Unknown	75% of the army killed According to Historians Total Massacre Of Army was 35,000 Pathans be Killed

The Battle of Haidru, also called Battle of Attock, was fought in 1828 by the Sikh forces led by Hari Singh Nalwa and the Mujahideen forces led by Syed Ahmad Barelvi.

== Background and Battle ==
After being unsuccessful with Peshawar, Sayyid Ahmad Barelvi made a plan to take over Attock. However, Khadi Khan of Hund who was a close ally of Sayyid betrayed the Mujahideen and told the plan to Hari Singh Nalwa, and the plan failed. After the battle, Sayyid moved to the west of the Indus.

== Aftermath ==
After the treachery of Khadi Khan, Sayyid defeated and killed him in 1829 at the battle of Hund.

== See also ==
- Battle of Akora Khattak
- Battle of Shaidu
- Battle of Balakot
