= Battle of Akora Khattak =

19th century Mujahidin-Sikh battle

Battle of Akora
- Part of Mujahidin movement (Syed Ahmad's Holy War)
Date	21 December 1826
Location	Akora, Nowshera District
Result	See result

Belligerents
Mujahideen	Sikh Empire

Commanders and leaders
Syed Ahmad Barelvi; Khadi Khan; Baqar Ali †; Allahbakhsh Khan †	Budh Singh Sandhanwalia; Atar Singh Sandhanwalia

Strength
1,500	4,000–10,000

Casualties and losses
82	500–700

The Battle of Akora Khattak was the first significant clash between the Mujahidin movement led by Syed Ahmad Barelvi and the Sikh Empire. The attack was successful, resulting in significant casualties for the opposition.

== Battle ==
Akora Khattak, located 18 miles from Attock across the Indus, held strategic importance. The area was inhabited by Khattak tribe led by Najaf Khan, who retreated into the hills when the Sikhs conquered Peshawar. At this time, Budh Singh Sandhanwalia was stationed in Akora with 4,000 troops. Syed Ahmad Barelvi gathered his soldiers for a night ambush. In the early morning of 21 December 1826, when the Sikhs were sleeping in the bitter cold, Allah Bakhsh Khan led the mujahidin in their attack and repulsed the Sikhs. The mujahidin lost 36 Hindustanis and 46 Kandaharis, including Patna's Maulvi Baqar Ali and their leader Allah Bakhsh Khan, while the Sikhs lost between 500 and 700 well-equipped soldiers.

The initial assault caused heavy Sikh losses, but the attackers then turned to looting the camp, allowing the Sikhs to regroup. Budh Singh reorganised his troops, counter-attacked, and repulsed the mujahideen, who withdrew to the hills.

== Result ==
Sources differ in their description of the outcome of the battle. Some accounts highlight the success of the mujahidin’s surprise night attack, during which the Sikh forces took heavy losses.

Other accounts state that, despite the initial success of the attack, the Sikh forces under Budh Singh Sandhanwalia regrouped and repulsed the attackers after the mujahidin turned to plundering the camp, forcing them to withdraw into the hills.

Accordingly, the battle has been variously presented in the sources as an early mujahidin success, a failed attempt to secure a decisive victory, or a tactically mixed engagement in which the surprise assault inflicted substantial Sikh losses but did not produce lasting control of the field.

== Aftermath ==
Following the successful guerrilla attack, the Yusufzai and Khattak tribesmen, having suffered few casualties, returned to the hills. Subsequently, these tribesmen launched a number of guerrilla attacks against the Sikhs. After the battle, Syed Ahmad shifted his headquarters to Sitana at the foot of the Mahaban mountains on the western side of the Indus. The success in ambush aided Syed Ahmad in gaining a wide following in Peshawar.

Although the night attack had inflicted substantial losses on the Sikh force, the mujahidin failed to convert the surprise assault into a decisive victory, and the frontier campaign continued in the following months.

== See also ==
- Battle of Shaidu
- Battle of Haidru (1828)
- Battle of Balakot
