= Talhata =

Talhatta تلہٹہ
- Village and union council
- Interactive map of Talhatta
- Coordinates: 34.447°N 73.3613°E
- Country: Pakistan
- Region: Khyber-Pakhtunkhwa
- District: Mansehra District
- Time zone: UTC+5 (PST)

Talhatta is a village and union council (an administrative subdivision) of Mansehra District (Tehsil Balakot) Kaghan Valley, in the Khyber Pakhtunkhwa province of Pakistan. It is located in the south of the district and borders Kashmir's Muzaffarabad District.
