= Yaghistan =

19th century frontier region

Yaghistan (Urdu: یاغستان, romanized: Yāg͟histān, lit. 'land of the rebellious and hostility') was a key frontier region between Emirate of Afghanistan and British Indian Empire.

This was an area where rebels lived, on either side of the Durand Line, roughly corresponding to the later tribal areas and Malakand and Hazara agencies of Pakistan.

The term, in use since at least 1868, was also used in Afghanistan where Amir Abdur Rehman characterized eastern Pashtun population as "unruly" and "rebels".

== History ==
Yāg͟histān was originally inhabited by Indo-Aryan Kōhistānī speakers. According to the Encyclopaedia of Islam:

"Yāg̲h̲istān referred to different sanctuaries used by Mujahideen against the British authorities from early 19th to late 19th century, in the various independent tribal areas, mainly inhabited by the Pashtun, Kashmiri and Kohistani people in the hinterland of what became the North-West Frontier Province (NWFP) of British India such as the Mohmand Agency, Bunēr, Dīr, Swāt, Kohistān, Hazāra..."

Initially, any frontier region outside the direct control of the British colonial government was known as Yaghistan, which at its widest extent included Balochistan and Sarhad. Between 1844 and 1900, the term came to be used for the independent tribes of Hindu Kush, who were considered "impossible to be administered", as they were always outside the sphere of influence of either British Raj or the Emirate of Afghanistan.

Yāghistān was the center of jihad movement of Syed Ahmad Barelvi against the Sikh Empire as well as Mahmud Hasan Deobandi's Silk Letter Movement. The area was never conquered by the British Raj and its people and the un-administered tribes always remained hostile towards the British.

== See also ==
- Dasht-e Yahudi
