= Hazara Tribal Agency =

Administrative sub-division in British India

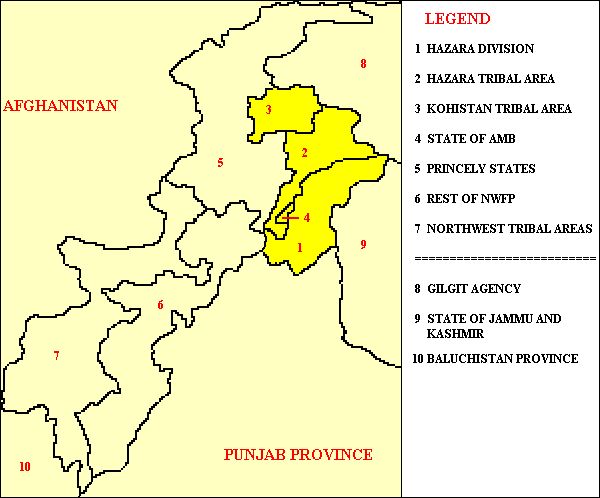
Hazara and surrounding areas

During colonial rule, agencies were administrative sub-divisions of British India. The Hazara Tribal Agency was one of these.

== Hazara ==
The Hazara region was split into the following four parts:

1. Hazara Division (Abbottabad and Mansehra)
2. Hazara Tribal Area (Battagram and Torghar District, An area under tribal Swati Khans)
3. Kohistan Tribal Area
4. Princely State of Amb

The northernmost part was the Kohistan Tribal Area, whilst the southernmost part was the Hazara Division. Hazara Tribal Agency was located between the Hazara Division and the Kohistan Tribal Area.

== Location ==
The Hazara Tribal Area, was located in the northwest of British India, it bordered the following areas.

1. Kohistan Tribal Area (to the northwest)
2. Gilgit Agency (to the north and northeast)
3. Hazara Division (to the south)
4. Amb (to the south east)

The Hazara Division lay along the route to Kashmir and Punjab. The State of Amb formed an enclave within the southern part of the Hazara Tribal area (the North, West and Southern frontiers of the state were along the borders of the agency).
