= Battle of Shaidu =

Conflict between Mujahideen and Sikh Khalsa Fauj

- Part of Tariqa-i-Muhammadiyya movement
Date	March 1827
Location	Shaidu
Result	Sikh victory

Belligerents
Sikh Empire	Mujahideen

Commanders and leaders
Sardar Hari Singh Nalwa	Syed Ahmad Barelvi

Strength
10,000–30,000; 12 cannons	30,000–70,000; 8 cannons

Casualties and losses
Unknown	6,000 -12,000 killed

The Battle of Shaidu, also known as the Battle of Pirpai, was fought in March 1827 between the Sikh forces led by Hari Singh Nalwa and the mujahideen troops, mainly Khattak and Yousafzai tribesmen, led by Syed Ahmad Barelvi. The Sikhs were victorious.

== Background ==
Budh Singh Sandhawalia accompanied by 4,000 horsemen was sent towards Attock to assist in putting down the Yusufzai rebellion. When Budh Singh arrived at Hazro, he was challenged by Ashraf Khan of Zaida, Fateh Khan of Panjtar and Khadi Khan of Hund along with some mujahideen. The mujahideen fell back. Following this, a battle was fought at Shaidu.

== Battle ==
Per the Waqai Syed Ahmad, a collection of letters of Barelvi, he claimed to have been poisoned by the cook of Yar Muhammad as he felt sick night before the battle. However, Shah Ismail seated him on the elephant and took him to the battlefield. For few days, the Sikh army remained in trenches, under assault of mujahideen, who were mainly Pashtuns. The action by Sikh army commenced at about ten in the morning. Budh Singh was joined by Gulab Singh, Suchait Singh and Atariwala Sardars. The Sikh army with 30,000 combatants was numerically inferior to Pashtuns but superior in training and discipline. The Gulabnama claims that the Pashtuns numbered more than 100,000. According to Altaf Qadir, the strength of mujahideen could not have been more than 30,000, as Peshawar Valley could not supply more fighters in the early 19th century. Around 6,000 troops were killed or wounded on the side of the Pashtuns. Yar Muhammad along with his men deserted the Muslim ranks.

== Aftermath ==
It was a disastrous battle for Barelvi and his allies that led to the defeat of mujahideen. This was last battle of Pashtuns against the Sikhs. The Sikhs celebrated the victory with great pomp by illuminating the city of Lahore.

== See also ==
- Battle of Akora Khattak
- Battle of Haidru (1828)
- Battle of Balakot
