= Thomas Durand Baker =

British Army lieutenant-general (1837–1893)

Lieutenant-General Sir Thomas Durand Baker KCB
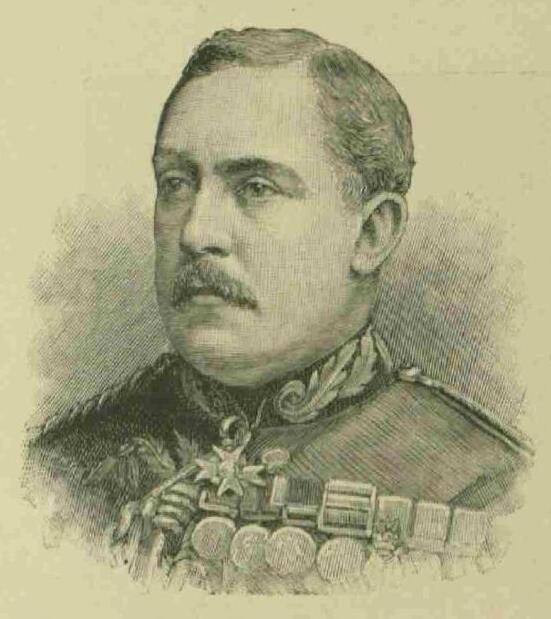
- Born: 23 March 1837
- Died: 9 February 1893 (aged 55); Pau, France
- Burial place: Bishop's Tawton, United Kingdom
- Military career
- Allegiance: United Kingdom
- Branch: British Army
- Service years: 1854–1893
- Rank: Lieutenant-General
- Conflicts: Crimean War; Third Anglo-Ashanti War; Second Anglo-Afghan War
- Awards: Knight Commander of the Order of the Bath

Lieutenant-General Sir Thomas Durand Baker KCB (23 March 1837 – 9 February 1893) was a British army officer, and Quartermaster-General to the Forces.

== Military career ==
Educated at Cheltenham College, Baker was commissioned into the 18th (Royal Irish) Regiment in 1854. He served in the Crimean War and was present at the Siege of Sevastapol. He was involved in suppressing the Indian Mutiny in 1857.

In 1863 he was deployed to New Zealand where he served as Deputy Assistant Adjutant-General and then Assistant Adjutant-General. He was involved in the capture of Orakau in 1864.

Then in 1873 he was despatched, during the Third Anglo-Ashanti War, to West Africa where he served as Assistant Adjutant, then Quartermaster-General and then finally as Chief of Staff.

He was deployed to Afghanistan in 1879 where he became a Brigade Commander and took part in the Battle of Kandahar in 1880. In 1882 he went to Ireland as Deputy Quartermaster-General and then as Deputy Adjutant-General. He became Adjutant-General, India in 1884 and General Officer Commanding a Division of the Bengal Army in 1886.

His final appointment was as Quartermaster-General to the Forces in 1890; he died while still in office in 1893.

Military offices
Preceded by George Greaves	Adjutant-General, India; 1884–1887	Succeeded by William Elles
Preceded by Sir Redvers Buller	Quartermaster-General to the Forces; 1890–1893	Succeeded by Sir Robert Biddulph
