= Mayar, Mardan =

Mayar مایار
- Village and union council
- Location in Pakistan
- Coordinates: 34°09′48″N 72°05′02″E
- Region: Khyber Pakhtunkhwa
- District: Mardan District

Area
  - Total: 5 km^{2} (1.9 sq mi)
- Time zone: UTC+5 (PST)
- 23290: 23290
- Website: www.fb.com/7imsimaam

Mayar (مایار) is a village and union council in Mardan District of Khyber Pakhtunkhwa, Pakistan. It is located in the NE of Mardan city.
