= Second Black Mountain Expedition =

British Indian frontier campaign (1868)

- Part of the Mujahidin movement
Date	1868
Location	Hazara
Result	British Indian victory

Belligerents
British Empire: India Tanolis	Hindustani mujahideen Hassanzai; Swati tribe Pariari Sayyids; Tikariwals; Deshiwals; Chagharzais; Nandihar

Commanders and leaders
	Emir Abdullah Azīmabādi

Casualties and losses
	Unknown

The Second Black Mountain Expedition was an expedition by the British Army against the Mujahidin movement and Black Mountain tribes in the erstwhile Punjab Province of British India (modern-day Khyber Pakhtunkhwa, Pakistan).

At the instigation of the Khan of Agror of the Swati tribe, a newly built police station was burnt by a raid of Pashtun tribes, trans-border Swati tribesmen and Pariari Sayyids. This was not tolerated, and a punitive expedition was led against the Pariari Sayyids, Nandihar, Deshiwals, Tikariwals, Hasanzai, Akazais and Chagharzais. After the expedition, Hindustani mujahideen were forced to relocate once again by the Hasanzai tribe in compliance with the treaty with British government, and moving through Palosai, Thakot and finally settling at Buner in 1882 and building a mud fort there.
