= Balakot =

Town in Khyber Pakhtunkhwa, Pakistan

Balakot بالاکوٹ
- Balakot Upper Pakhli
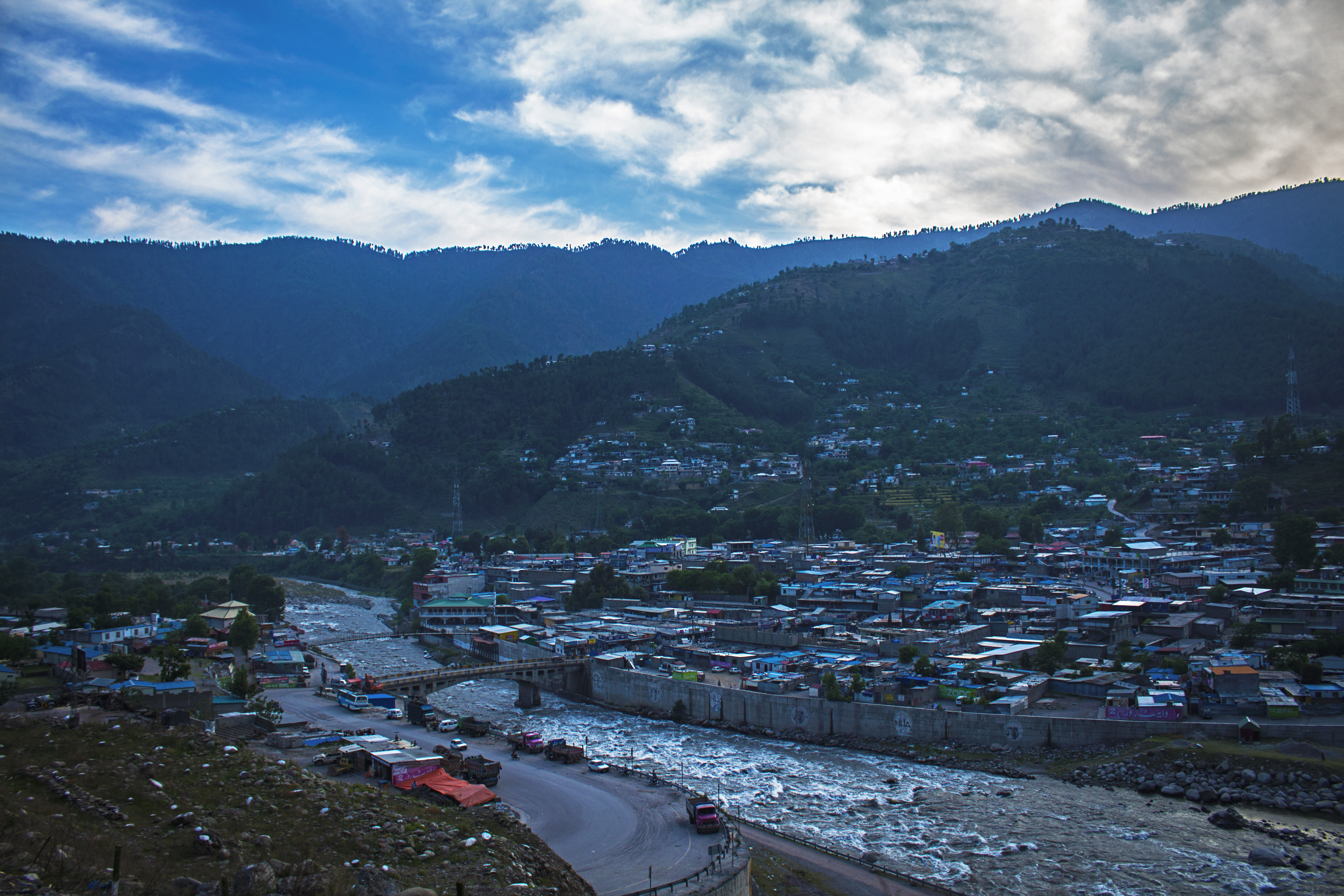

- Location within Pakistan Location within Khyber Pakhtunkhwa
- Coordinates: 34.54°N 73.35°E
- Country: Pakistan
- Province: Khyber Pakhtunkhwa
- Division: Hazara
- District: Mansehra
- Tehsil: Balakot

Government
  - Type: Municipal Corporation
  - MPA PK-36: Munir Lughmani Swati
  - Hereditary Khan: •Six triya of Swati
- Time zone: UTC+05:00 (PST)

Balakot (/ˈbælɑːˌkɒt/; Urdu: بالاکوٹ; Urdu pronunciation: [bɑː.lɑː.koːʈ]) is a town in Mansehra district, Khyber Pakhtunkhwa, Pakistan. The town was significantly damaged during the 2005 Kashmir earthquake but was later rebuilt with the assistance of the Government of Pakistan.

== Geography ==
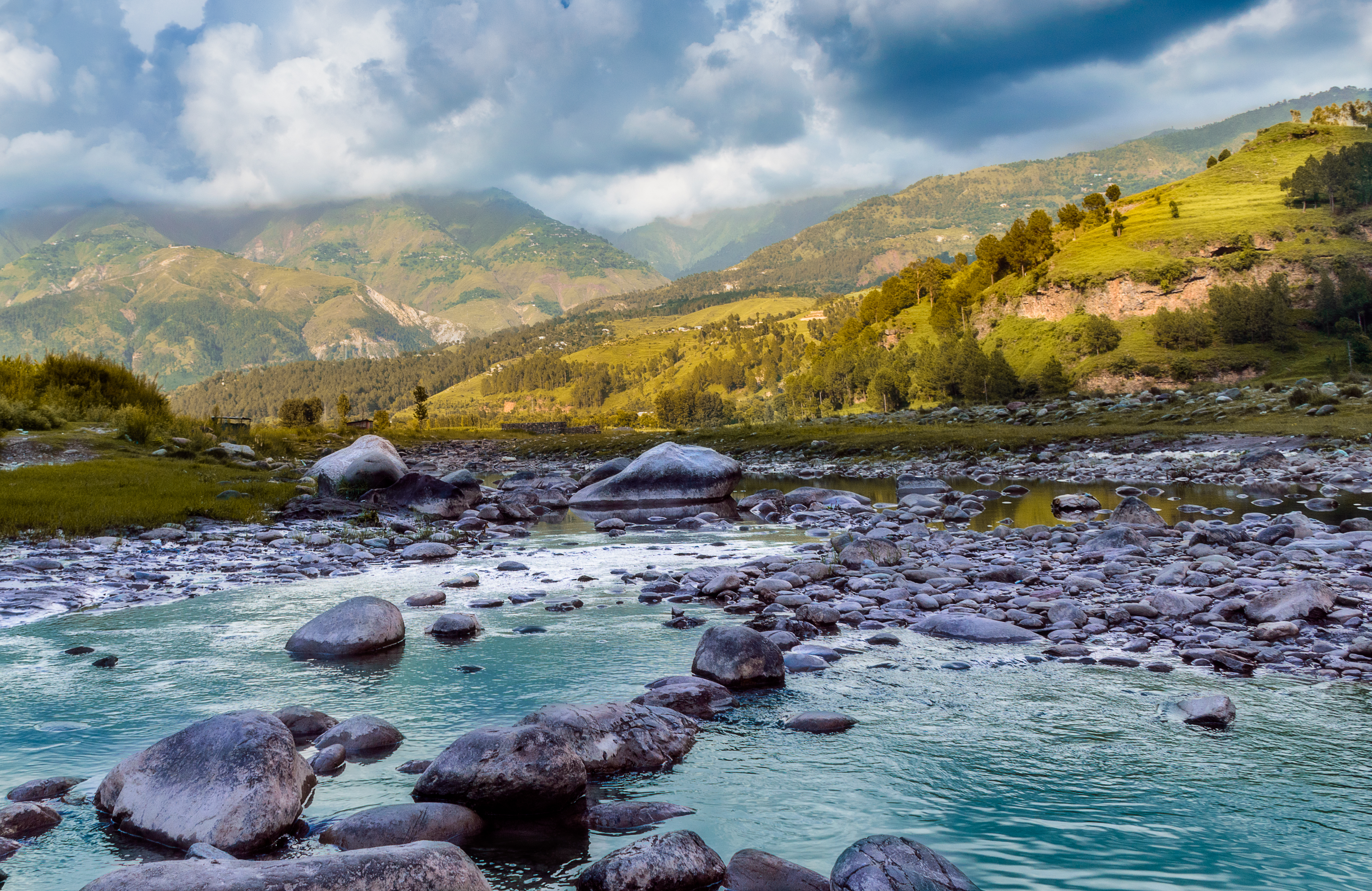
Kunhar river flowing through Balakot

Balakot is located on the right bank of the Kunhar River in northern Pakistan. It is almost two-thirds of the length of the river from its origin at Lake Dharam Sar deep in the Kaghan Valley before its confluence with the Jehlum River.

The lower area below Balakot, sometimes referred to as Nainsukh Valley, is temperate, while Kaghan Valley above Balakot City is cold enough to turn the whole area to freezing in the winter. Kaghan Valley is a pleasant summer destination. Its upper part from Naran upstream lacks the monsoon, but the lower part gets it well, and so it is forested.

== Climate ==
Balakot has a humid subtropical climate (Köppen climate classification Cfa) with hot summers and cool winters. Rainfall in Balakot is much higher than in most other parts of Pakistan. The heaviest rainfall occurs either in late winter (February–March) associated with frontal systems, or in the monsoon season (June–August); however, all months see significant rainfall on average.

Climate data for Balakot
Month	Jan	Feb	Mar	Apr	May	Jun	Jul	Aug	Sep	Oct	Nov	Dec	Year
Record high °C (°F)	24.4 (75.9)	25.2 (77.4)	31.1 (88.0)	36.0 (96.8)	43.3 (109.9)	42.1 (107.8)	41.2 (106.2)	39.7 (103.5)	35.2 (95.4)	33.9 (93.0)	29.0 (84.2)	24.7 (76.5)	43.3 (109.9)
Mean daily maximum °C (°F)	13.9 (57.0)	15.2 (59.4)	19.3 (66.7)	25.9 (78.6)	31.3 (88.3)	35.5 (95.9)	32.3 (90.1)	31.2 (88.2)	31.0 (87.8)	27.4 (81.3)	22.2 (72.0)	15.9 (60.6)	25.1 (77.2)
Daily mean °C (°F)	8.1 (46.6)	9.5 (49.1)	13.5 (56.3)	19.3 (66.7)	24.3 (75.7)	28.1 (82.6)	26.8 (80.2)	25.9 (78.6)	24.0 (75.2)	19.3 (66.7)	14.2 (57.6)	9.5 (49.1)	18.5 (65.4)
Mean daily minimum °C (°F)	2.2 (36.0)	3.8 (38.8)	7.6 (45.7)	12.7 (54.9)	17.4 (63.3)	20.7 (69.3)	21.2 (70.2)	20.6 (69.1)	17.1 (62.8)	11.3 (52.3)	6.1 (43.0)	3.1 (37.6)	12.0 (53.6)
Record low °C (°F)	−3 (27)	−2.2 (28.0)	−1 (30)	3.9 (39.0)	8.0 (46.4)	10.0 (50.0)	15.0 (59.0)	13.3 (55.9)	10.0 (50.0)	5.2 (41.4)	1.7 (35.1)	−1.3 (29.7)	−3 (27)
Average precipitation mm (inches)	105.4 (4.15)	156.1 (6.15)	195.9 (7.71)	122.5 (4.82)	80.5 (3.17)	107.3 (4.22)	384.3 (15.13)	311.4 (12.26)	100.8 (3.97)	48.9 (1.93)	44.0 (1.73)	87.5 (3.44)	1,744.6 (68.68)
Source: NOAA (1971–1990)

== Administration ==
Balakot is one of the main cities in Mansehra District. It serves as the chief city of Balakot Tehsil, which is the largest Tehsil in Mansehra District. It also has a Union Council and administers the many surrounding smaller towns and villages.

== History ==
=== Early history ===
The known history of the city was not well recorded before the British period.

When the Pakhli was conquered by Swatis from Turks then after the first "Vesh of Swatis" in 1703, Balakot city and Baffa city was given to Sarkheli sub-section which is further divided into 6 Khels, viz Lughmanis, Khawaja Khels, Bejori, Teetwal and Dodyari. These Khels own majority lands of Balakot upto present era.

Archaeologists from Hazara University, however, have found terracotta remains and terracotta figurines from distant points at high altitudes around the area. They might shed light on earlier inhabitants of the area. Old graveyards also suggest linkages towards pre-Muslim occupants who later converted to Islam.

=== Battle of Balakot (1831) ===
The battle of Balakot (1831) was the defining battle of Syed Ahmad Barelvi's Tehreek-ul-Mujahideen against the Sikh empire, in which he and Shah Ismail Dehlvi was killed.The eventual defeat and death of Syed Ahmad Barelvi and Shah Ismail Shaheed at the Battle of Balakot in 1831 were significantly impacted by the collapse of their alliance with local Pashtun tribes. While Pashtun leaders had initially supported the mujahideen in their struggle against the Sikh Empire, relations deteriorated as the movement attempted to impose religious reforms—such as the mandatory remarriage of widows and the abolition of traditional bride prices—that were seen as intrusive to local tribal customs and economic structures. This social friction, compounded by disagreements over taxation and the management of war spoils, led to a loss of tribal support. By the time of the final engagement in Balakot, this fractured relationship left the mujahideen vulnerable; historical accounts indicate that the Sikh forces were able to navigate the difficult terrain to launch a surprise attack partly due to intelligence provided by local guides who had turned against the movement.

According to book Seerat-e-Syed Ahmed, when he came to Balakot for the first time, he took refugee in the Haveli of Wasil Khan Swati, the powerful Chief and Khan of Balakot at that time.

Balakot was a refuge for Mujahideen after being ousted from Swabi and Amb. The Sikhs, who outnumbered the ill-prepared Mujahideen, defeated them. For the sake of this event, Balakot City is sometimes also referred to as Sarzameen-e-Shuhada ("The Land of Martyrs").

Mahtab Singh, a writer of the history of Hazara, writes that Sikhs, to stop the movement from continuing any further, reopened the grave of Syed Ahmad and set the body into the Kunhar River, probably in Talhatta, 10 km down stream.

Sikh rule was brutal and fearsome and ended after James Abbot's capture of Hazara. There have been many skirmishes between locals and Sikh forces. One famous event happened in 1844 when Gulab Singh, Maharaja of Kashmir, sent a campaign to the Chilas under Diwan Ibrahim, which was effectively destroyed by local populations in Kaghan Valley at Diwan Bela, named after him.

=== War of Independence (1857) ===
After James Abbot's coming to the region in the early 1840s, Sikhs were kept in check in upper Hazara, and he was able to wage war on Sikhs with this local support in Haripur.

The Chiefs also known as Khans of Balakot had been from Swati tribe throughout the history.

During the War of Independence in 1857, no local chief is reported to have revolted. Instead, local chiefs helped the British Army bring down mutineers in Hoti Garrission, Mardan. In another incident, 55th Native Infantry mutineers were trying to seek refuge in Kashmir State, however, they were only able to cross the Indus in Kohistan, and were caught near Lake Dudipatsar by local forces of the Kaghan chiefs, Kohistanis, and Gujjars. The whole gorge is now known as Purbi Nar (the gorge of Eastern People, or Bengalis). A few escaped to Kashmir State, where they were handed over to the British Army for execution.

=== 2005 earthquake ===
The hillside town of Balakot, comprising 12 union councils with a population of 30,000 people, was completely destroyed by the earthquake on October 8, 2005. The fault line passes through Balakot. It follows the hilly area to the north up to Allai and leads to the Bagh in Azad Jammu and Kashmir from the villages of Balakot. This fault line, the Balakot-Bagh fault, is said to be the source of the Kashmir earthquake. The estimated death toll from Balakot town and the districts in the affected Kashmir area was between 73,000 and 80,000, with some sources stating it to be more than 80,000.

The United Arab Emirates volunteered to rebuild this town into an improved one with housing colonies, schools, hospitals, and other civic facilities. Saudi Public Assistance for Pakistan Earthquake Victims (SPAPEV), a Saudi relief organisation, also provided much assistance. Late last year the Pakistani government announced that the city would be relocated about 20 km away to a safer spot with more earthquake-proof buildings.

A Jaish-e-Mohammed militant group had a presence near the town. A 2004 United States Department of Defense document also stated that there was a JeM training camp in Balakot. However, according to analysts, the militants left Balakot after the earthquake in 2005 to avoid detection by the international aid groups arriving to provide relief.

=== New Balakot City ===
After the earthquake, it was discovered that the city was built on geological fault lines, and the government recommended moving the residents 15 miles away to Bakarial. The new site was decided to be renamed "New Balakot City," and the original town of Balakot to be preserved as "national heritage".

In 2011, it was reported that many residents of Balakot had been rebuilding their homes and businesses in the town, despite a government ban.

A decade after the earthquake, the New Balakot City was still being constructed and many residents still lived in temporary earthquake-resistant shelters. Amid the locals' discontent, the Pakistani government cited the problem of acquiring the land at Bakrayal as a reason for the delay due to a dispute between the national and provincial government as well as the landowners. There are observers who also note that political patronage diverted aid away from those who need it. There are those who started rebuilding their houses in the old city. By 2006, construction of New Balakot City had resumed.

=== 2019 bombing by the Indian Air Force ===
In the early morning hours of 26 February, Indian warplanes crossed the de facto border in the disputed region of Kashmir, and dropped bombs in the vicinity of Balakot.

Pakistan's military, the first to announce the airstrike on 26 February morning, described the Indian planes as dropping their targeted bomb in a camp of Jaish-e-Mohammed near Balakot.

India, confirming the airstrike later the same day, characterised it to be a preemptive strike directed against a terrorist training camp, and causing the deaths of more than 100 terrorists. Analysis of open-source satellite imagery by the Atlantic Council's Digital Forensics Laboratory, San Francisco-based Planet Labs, European Space Imaging, and the Australian Strategic Policy Institute, has concluded that India did not hit any targets of significance on the Jaba hilltop site in the vicinity of Balakot.

Villagers from the area spoke of four bombs striking a nearby forest and field around 3 am, damaging a building, and injuring a local man. Journalists associated with the Associated Press visited the area on 26 February and saw craters and damaged trees. The villagers they met reported no casualties. A team from Al Jazeera visited the site two days after the strikes and noted "splintered pine trees and rocks" which were strewn across the four blast craters. The local hospital officials and residents asserted that they did not come across any casualty or wounded people. The reporters located the facility, a school run by Jaish-e-Mohammed, at around a kilometre to the east of one of the bomb craters, atop a steep ridge but were unable to access it. Reporters from Reuters were repeatedly denied access to the madrassa by the military citing security issues but they noted the structure (and its vicinity) to be intact from the back. The press wing of the Pakistan military had twice postponed scheduled visits to the site. However, on 29 March 2019, Inter-Services Public Relations (ISPR) took journalists to the site where the strike took place. There were around 375 students present in the Madrasa. Journalists were allowed to interview the students. They were also allowed to take photos and record videos of the site.

On 10 April, some international journalists, who were taken to the Jaba hilltop in a tightly controlled trip after 45 days of the strike arranged by Pakistani government, discovered the largest building of the site to show no evidence of damage.

== Demographics ==
The majority of the population is speaker of Hindko and Gujari, both northwestern Indo-Aryan languages closely related to Punjabi, which are also spoken in the rest of Mansehra district.

== Transportation ==
In 1965, a bridge was built in Balakot over the Kunhar river called the Ayub Bridge. The bridge connects Balakot, as well as the Kaghan valley, with the rest of Pakistan.

== See also ==
- Kaghan
- Naran
