= Syed Ahmad Barelvi =

Indian Islamic revivalist and Sufi scholar (1786–1831)

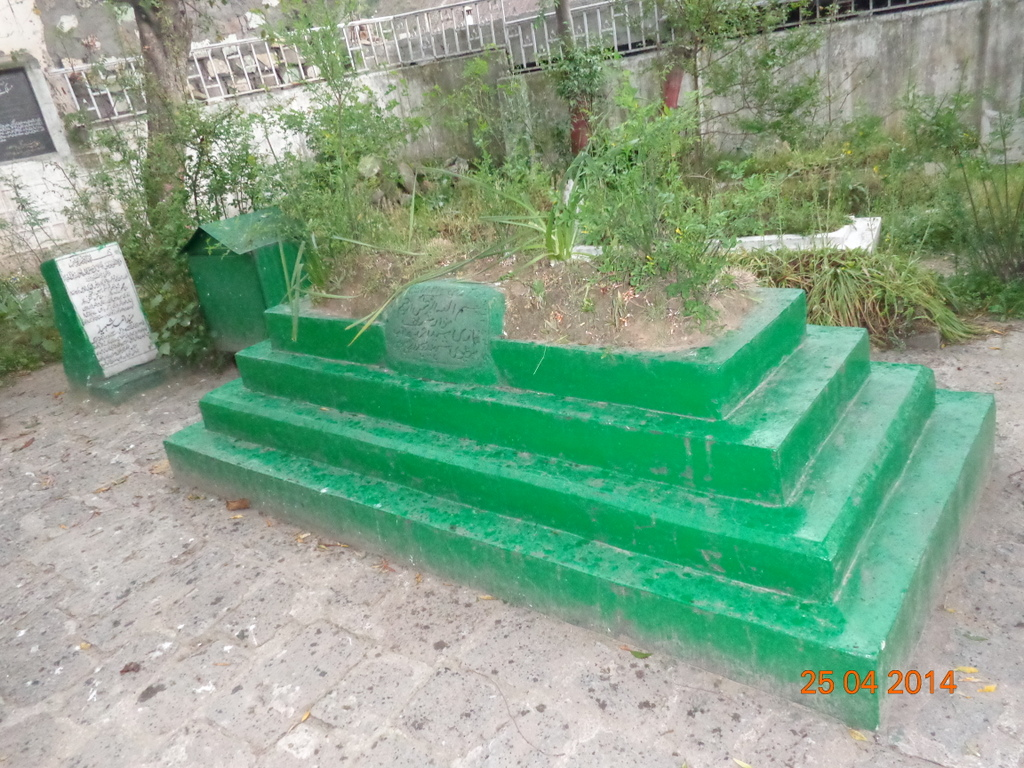
- Grave of Syed Ahmad in 2014

Personal life
- Born: 29 November 1786 Rae Bareli, Kingdom of Oudh
- Died: 6 May 1831 (aged 44) Balakot, Sikh Empire
- Main interest(s): Islamic fundamentalism, anti-Shi'ism, hadith, jihad
- Known for: Islamic revivalism
- Other names: Shaheed-e-Balakot, Imam-ul-Mujahidin

Religious life
- Religion: Sunni Islam
- Jurisprudence: Hanafi; Independent
- Tariqa: Chishti; Naqshbandi-Mujaddidi; Qadiri
- Creed: Athari
- Movement: Tariqa-i Muhammadiyyah

Senior posting
- Influenced by: Shah Waliullah, Shah Abdul Aziz
- Influenced: Shah Ismail Dehlvi, Titumir, Saidu Baba, Shah Muhammad Ishaq, Siddiq Hasan Khan, Syed Nazeer Husain, Karamat Ali Jaunpuri, Noor Muhammad Nizampuri, Rashid Ahmad Gangohi, Abul A'la Maududi

Syed Ahmad Barelvi, also known as Sayyid Ahmad Shahīd, (1786–1831) was an Indian Islamic revivalist, Sunni scholar, Naqshbandi Sufi murshid, and military commander from Raebareli in northern India. The epithet 'Barelvi' is derived from Raebareli, his place of origin. Syed Ahmad led the Tariqa-i Muhammadiyah, an Islamic reformist and jihad movement against the Sikh Empire, which later spearheaded decades-long anti-colonial uprisings across various regions of British India. He is considered by many Muslims to be a mujaddid (renewer) of his era.

He is also revered as a major scholarly leader by the followers of the Ahl-i Hadith and Deobandi movements.

== Early life and education ==
Syed Ahmad Barelvi was born on 29 November 1786 in Raebareli, into a Syed family. His primary education was initiated in 1791, when he was aged four. As he turned ten, his father died and the familial responsibilities fell onto his shoulders, which made him travel to Lucknow, at the age of eighteen in search of work. He was however inclined to stay in Delhi in the tutelage of Shah Abdul Aziz, an Islamic scholar who was the son of revivalist reformer Shah Waliullah.

Syed Ahmad travelled to Delhi, and was subsequently allotted accommodation in the Akbarabadi Mosque. He studied in the Madrasah-i Rahimiyah of Shah Abdul Aziz for a few years, and returned to his hometown in the late 1807 or the early 1808. He distinguished himself through his sincerity and rigorous spiritual discipline, often staying awake the entire night for prayers.

Syed Ahmad was raised in a family celebrated for religious knowledge and piety. From childhood, his life was marked by intense devotion, often prioritizing the needs of the poor and the elderly over his own comfort. As he matured, he developed a deep passion for martial arts, including archery, fencing, and swimming, skills that would later serve his leadership role.

== Early career ==
After his tutelage under Shah Abdul Aziz, Syed Ahmad began his career as a military expeditionary Pindari horseman in the militia of Amir Khan Pindari, at the age of twenty-five. During this period many of the north Indian Muslim horsemen from Awadh were unemployed and saw a destruction of their livelihood due to the fall of Muslim rule; a large number of those disaffected turned into freebooters known as the Pindari who were usually unpaid and relied entirely on loot.

During the third Anglo-Maratha war in 1817, Amir Khan allied with the East India Company. The British Governor-General and Commander-in-Chief, Francis Rawdon-Hastings, resolved to defeat the Pindaris whom he deemed a menace. The treaty of Gwalior severed the link between them and Scindia. Moreover, the treaty required the latter to join forces with the East India Company to eliminate the Pindaris and Pathans. Bowing to the inevitable, Amir Khan came to terms with the English, agreeing to disband his men in return for a large stipend and recognition as a hereditary Nawab, and settled down to consolidate his petty state. Being against this treaty, Syed Ahmad left the military service.

Now unemployed, Syed Ahmad returned to Delhi. During this period, Syed Ahmad gained religious maturity and harmonized his military experiences with a commitment to establish Shari'a (Islamic law). Two family members of the theologian Shah Waliullah — Shah Ismail Dehlavi (1771 – 1831) and Maulvi Abdul Hai (died 1828) — became his associates, which raised his mystic confidence and stature. This endorsement added to his reputation, and his popularity grew with adherents flocking to him by the thousands.

== Reform movement ==
Syed Ahmad was the first major Islamic theologian in the subcontinent to call for an Islamic movement that was simultaneously scholarly, military, and political to counter the expansion of British rule. He eagerly addressed the Muslim masses directly instead of traditional leaders, in his call for a popular jihad against the Sikh rule in Punjab. His evangelism — based on networks of preachers, collectors, and judges — also addressed the common people, and not only the rulers' courts.

At the core of the teachings of Syed Ahmad's Tariqa-i Muhammadiyah movement was its emphasis on upholding tawḥīd (monotheism) and adherence to Shari'a, and its opposition to superstitious beliefs and customs that were contrary to Shari'a. The movement denounced various local rituals and superstitious beliefs related to saint veneration and shrine visitations, which he regarded as bid'ah (religious innovations) and shirk (polytheism), and emphasis to uphold tawhid. However, unlike the Wahhabi movement in Najd, the supporters of the Tariqa-i Muhammadiyah movement did not oppose Sufism, and regarded themselves as traditional Sunni Sufis who campaigned against what they viewed as deviations from orthodox Sufism. Syed Ahmad himself was a Sufi saint and murshid who initiated many of his followers into the traditional Sufi orders.

Syed Ahmad's reformist teachings were set down in two prominent treatises: Sirat'ul Mustaqim (The Straight Path) and Taqwiyatul-Iman (Strengthening of the Faith), compiled by his acolyte Shah Isma'il Dehlvi. The two works stressed the centrality of tawhid (monotheism), advocated that acts of worship — such as du'a and sacrifices — belonged solely to God, and denounced all those practices and beliefs that were held in any way to compromise tawhid. According to Barbara Metcalf, the followers of Syed Ahmad identified three tendencies as sources of threat to their movement's teachings: "false Sufism, Shi'i doctrines and practices, and popular custom".

Syed Ahmad urged Muslims to follow Tariqa-i Muhammadiyah, abandon all superstitious activities in various Sufi orders, and called for a total reformation of Tasawwuf. Syed Ahmad reserved his sharpest condemnations for the moral degradation of Muslims and blamed the corrupt Sufis as the primary cause of Muslim decline. He called upon Muslims to strictly abide by the tenets of the Shari'a (Islamic law) by following the Qur'an and the Sunnah. Once he said to a group of his disciples:

Brethren! the purpose of performing the bay'ah is that you should give up everything you do which is of the nature of polytheism or heresy, your making of tazias, setting up banners, worshipping the tombs of Pirs and martyrs, making offerings to them and taking vows in their names. All this you should give up, and do not believe that your good and ill come from anyone except God; do not recognize anyone but Him as having the power to grant the fulfillment of your wishes. If you continue [in this way of polytheism and heresy], merely offering bay'ah will bring no benefit.

Syed Ahmad visited numerous towns of the north Indian plains between 1818 and 1821. He sent hundreds of missionaries to preach against Shi'a beliefs and practices. He called upon the Muslim masses to abandon practices related to Shi'a influence, such as the tazias which were replicas of the tombs of the martyrs of Karbala taken in procession during the mourning ceremony of Muharram. Syed Ahmad reportedly destroyed tazias, an act that resulted in riots. Shah Isma'il also declared the act of breaking tazias as an obligation upon all believers and asserted that it was as virtuous as breaking idols. Syed Ahmad is reported to have organized the burning of thousands of tazias.

In 1821, Syed Ahmad left for Hajj along with a group of devotees. He returned from Hajj in 1823, and once again visited different parts of India. He visited Calcutta, where he gained a number of followers, notably Titumir, who spearheaded the movement in Bengal. For Syed Ahmad and the followers of the Faraizi movement, India was Dar al-Harb (a land without a peace treaty with Muslims) and therefore jihad was obligatory for all Muslims.

Syed Ahmad's opponents labeled him a "Wahhabi", but he did not consider himself as such. Syed Ahmad was a follower of Shah Waliullah Dehlvi's spiritual path and a traditional Sunni who adhered to the Hanafi school.

== Jihad movement ==
Upon his return, Syed Ahmad regarded his immediate enemy to be the Sikh Empire ruled by Ranjit Singh, which was expanding close to Afghanistan. Syed Ahmad intended to establish an Islamic state in the Peshawar Valley, and use it as a strategic base for launching military campaigns at a later stage against the British colonial regime. When the military action began, some Muslim Nawabs (like his former employer Amir Khan) provided funds but did not join Syed Ahmad for jihad. Around 8,000 mujahideen accompanied him, mostly consisting of clergymen and poor people. The rulers of the states of Tonk, Gwalior, and Sindh supported Syed Ahmad.

Arriving in Peshawar Valley in late 1826, Syed Ahmad and his followers made their base in towns of Hund and Zaida in Swabi. Syed Ahmad called upon the local Pashtun and Hazarewal tribes to wage jihad, and demanded that they renounce their tribal customs and adopt the Shari'a. The traditional khans were replaced by ulama (Islamic scholars) and a system of Islamic taxes was established to finance the movement. Soon after this evangelist campaign and the establishment of the Shari'a system, jihad was declared. He sent an ultimatum to Ranjit Singh, demanding him to accept Islam, or pay jizyah, or to prepare for an open war, further mentioning that in the case of later, all of Yaghistan supported his movement.

The mujahideen were educated with both theological doctrines and physical training sessions. Syed Ahmad organized wrestling, archery training, and shooting competitions. The mujahideen also repeated several Islamic anthems. One such popular anthem has survived, known as "Risala Jihad". On 21 December 1826, Syed Ahmad and his 1,500 followers clashed with 4,000 Sikh troops in the battle of Akora Khattak and obtained a significant victory. On 11 January 1827, allegiance was sworn on his hand and he was declared caliph and imam. Syed Ahmad's claim to khilafah was viewed with suspicion in the frontier region as well as in the clerical circles of northern India. When the Jumu'ah (Friday prayer) sermon was read in his name, symbolising his claim to power, the tribal chiefs became wary. According to prominent Pashtun sardars like Khadi Khan, maulvis were ill-equipped to run the affairs of a state. In response to the criticisms, Syed Ahmad asserted that his aim was not material but to lead a jihad against kuffar.

Apart from the rebellious Pashtun chieftains, Syed Ahmad's Islamic political movement and state-building project also faced opposition from a rival Naqshbandi-Mujaddidi faction, led by Hafiz Daraz and Hafiz Muhammad ‘Azim, which was based in Peshawar. However, Syed Ahmad's Mujaddidi credentials were well established, as he was a descendant of a prominent Mujaddidi saint. He was raised in the Mujaddidi spiritual tradition in India, and was a disciple of the prominent Sufi scholar Shah Abdul Aziz Dehlvi. Tariqa-i Muhammadiyah movement had emerged as an influential strand of the Naqshbandi-Mujaddidi order in the Indian subcontinent, and its revivalist teachings gained widespread acceptance among the Indian Naqshbandis of that period.

The Tariqa-i Muhammadiyah movement pioneered a reformulation of the Mujaddidi tradition. Its messaging, reformist themes, and literature were replete with Sufi terminology and remained rooted in the traditional Sufi paradigm, particularly shaped by the teachings of Ahmad Sirhindi. While leading the military efforts of the Tariqa-i Muhammadiyah, Syed Ahmad maintained strong ties with Sufi circles and initiated several pupils into the Naqshbandi, Qadiri, and Chishti orders. To Syed Ahmad's followers, his political and spiritual leadership was firmly based in the Sufi master-disciple tradition.

In March 1827, mujahideen suffered a serious defeat against the Sikhs during the battle of Shaidu, worsening the position of Syed Ahmad.

In addition to his Islamic social agenda, Syed Ahmad also attempted to collect ushr (an Islamic tithe), amounting to a tenth of crop yields. This policy was faced with fierce opposition from an alliance of local Pashtun tribesmen, who briefly managed to occupy Peshawar. The alliance was defeated and the Islamic reformers finally re-captured Peshawar.After the conquest of Peshawar by the mujahideen, Syed Ahmad announced the abolition of all tribal rituals that he regarded as bid'ah (religious innovations). He abolished various practices such as: the bride being paid a regular price for marriage; the widowed of the deceased Muslims being divided among his heirs; practice of more than four marriages; denial of inheritance to women; clan wars being considered like jihad and its plunder being considered as booty. He also pushed for aggressive and violent policies to enforce Sharia. These included: allowing brides as long as half of the agreed money was given; young girls eligible for marriage should be married immediately; flogging people who did not pray.

The rise of Syed Ahmad's political power and religious influence in the region emboldened his supporters to rally Pashtuns behind the Tariqa-i Muhammadiyah movement and launch armed uprisings against the Sikh Empire. Over several months during 1830, Sayed Ahmad tried to reconcile between established power hierarchies. However, this campaign was undermined by the betrayal of a local Pashtun khan, Sultan Mohammad Khan. After being bribed by Ranjit Singh, Durrani factions aligned with Sultan Mohammad Khan rose against him and massacred around two hundred mujahideen in the Peshawar Valley, and the movement was forced to retreat to the hills.

On 6 May 1831, on the day of Jumu'ah 23 Zulqa'da 1246 AH, Syed Ahmad Barelvi's mujahideen forces prepared for the final battle at Balakot in the mountainous valley of Mansehra. An ill-equipped army of mujahideen faced a significantly larger number of soldiers led by the Sikh commander Sher Singh. On that day, Syed Ahmad, Shah Isma'il, and prominent leaders of the Islamic movement fell fighting in the battlefield. Sikh victory at Balakot arose jubilation in Lahore. The defeat at Balakot was a devastating blow to the movement.

== Legacy ==
Syed Ahmad is widely regarded as the founder of the subcontinental Ahl-i Hadith movement and his teachings remain influential amongst its members. Another major group that carries his legacy is the Deobandi school of thought. Across South Asia, Syed Ahmad is widely revered by Muslims both as a saint and as a shahīd (martyr).

Edward Mortimer asserted that Syed Ahmad anticipated modern Islamists in the call for jihad and attempts to create Islamic state with strict enforcement of Shari'a. Olivier Roy considers Syed Ahmad to be the first modern Islamic leader in South Asia to lead a movement that was "religious, military and political" and to address the common people and rulers with a call for jihad. The mujahideen were unprecedented for their tactics of popular mobilization aimed at swiftly achieving the objectives of social reformation through military means, combined with fierce hostility towards non-Muslim powers such as the British Empire and the Sikhs. Syed Ahmad was committed to expand his emirate to the whole of South Asia and authored tracts calling upon Indian Muslims to join the cause of jihad.

Syed Ahmad attained the exemplar status of shahīd (martyr), one of the highest honours in Islam, and would inspire generations of militant Islamist ideologues and jihadi activists throughout the 19th, 20th, and 21st centuries. His calls to action — such as a return to the pristine Islam of the Salaf, and the purifying of Islamic culture from Western and Shi'i influences through armed jihad — became major hallmarks of South Asian and Central Asian militant Islamist movements like the Taliban. Al-Qaeda's ideology was greatly inspired by Syed Ahmad's jihad movement, which was waged from eastern Afghanistan and Khyber Pakhtunkwa. Influenced by Syed Ahmad, contemporary jihadists compare American hegemony to the 19th century British rule to justify their campaigns.

The jihad movement of Syed Ahmad made a great impact on Islamic scholarly tradition of South Asia and would deeply divide many clerics and theologians. Some intellectuals and scholars criticised the militant aspects of his reform programme, especially its sectarian violence against other self-professed Muslims whom the mujahideen declared as heretics or apostates. Wahiduddin Khan argued that Syed Ahmad's jihad was illegitimate, since it was self-declared and not waged by a Muslim ruler. Meanwhile, South Asian Islamists embraced Syed Ahmad's teachings and popularised his writings that sought the militant restoration of an Islamic state. All major organisations that subsequently wage militant jihad in Pakistan, Afghanistan, and Kashmir use the rhetoric and legacy of Syed Ahmad's mujahideen to gain support from the conservative base. Hafiz Saeed's Lashkar-e-Taiba and Masood Azhar's Jaish-e-Muhammad are two major militant Islamist organisations inspired by Syed Ahmad's movement active in Indian-administered Jammu and Kashmir. Other organisations include Harkat-ul-Mujahideen, a jihadist group in Pakistan.

Abul Hasan Ali Hasani Nadwi wrote Seerat-i-Sayyid Ahmad Shaheed, the first historical biography of Syed Ahmad Barelvi.

== Bibliography ==
- Qadir, Altaf (2014). Sayyid Ahmad Barailvi: His Movement and Legacy from the Pukhtun Perspective. SAGE Publishing India. ISBN 978-93-5150-486-3. l
- Nishat, Shah Ibadur Rahman (April 2015). سید احمد شہید: شخصیت، تحریک اور اثرات [Syed Ahmed Shaheed: Personality, Movement and Impact] (in Urdu) (1st ed.). Raebareli: Syed Ahmad Shaheed Academy.
- Adamec, Ludwig W. (2009). Historical Dictionary of Islam. Scarecrow Press. ISBN 978-0-8108-6303-3.
- Jalal, Ayesha (2009). "The Martyrs of Balakot". Partisans of Allah: Jihad in South Asia. Harvard University Press. pp. 58–113. ISBN 978-0-674-03907-0.
