= Hazara Expedition of 1891 =

British Indian frontier campaign (1891)

Date	1 March 1891 – 29 May 1891
Location	Hazara (modern-day Pakistan)
Result	British victory

Belligerents
British Empire: British Raj	Mujahidin; Swatis

Commanders and leaders
	Emir Abdullah Azīmabādi

Casualties and losses
	22 (Mujahidin)

The Second Hazara Expedition of 1891, also known as Fourth Black Mountain Expedition, was a British military campaign conducted against the Swati and Yusufzai tribes of Kala Dhaka and the Battagram, then referred to as the Black Mountains of Hazara and adjacent northern tracts. These areas form part of the present day Hazara region of Khyber Pakhtunkhwa province of Pakistan.

== Expedition ==
The expedition was undertaken following the failure of the tribal groups to comply with the agreements concluded after the First Hazara Expedition of 1888, prompting the British authorities to deploy a Hazara Field Force for a campaign lasting approximately two months in 1891. General Roberts observed that

the Black Mountain tribes, [having been] quite unsubdued by the fruitless expedition of 1888, had given trouble almost immediately afterwards. [The second expedition] was completely successful in political results as in its military conduct. The columns were not withdrawn until the tribesmen had become convinced that they were powerless to sustain a hostile attitude towards us, and that it was in their interest, as it was our wish, that they should henceforth be on amicable terms with us.

British and British Indian Army forces who took part in this expedition received the India General Service Medal with the clasp of Hazara 1891 (as had been done similarly in the 1888 expedition). The Royal Welch Fusiliers were one of the British regiments that took part in the expedition.

In the Fourth Black Mountain Expedition of 1891, Hindustani mujahideen once again attacked British at Ghazikot along with Jadoons, and suffered over 22 casualties. In the aftermath, Hasanzai and Akazai tribes signed agreement with British against mujahideen.

Allan James Macnab was one of the soldiers who was awarded the clasp of Hazara for his role in the night attack on Ghazikot.
