= Battle of Balakot =

1831 conflict between the Sikhs and Mujahideen

- Part of Syed Ahmad's Holy War
Date	6 May 1831
Location	Balakot, Pakistan 34.0034°N 71.3786°E
Result	Sikh victory

Belligerents
Sikh Empire	Mujahideen

Commanders and leaders
Sher Singh; Akali Hanuman Singh	Syed Ahmad Barelvi †; Shah Ismail Dehlvi †; Mirza Hayat Dehlvi †

Strength
5,000	700 (including 600 Hindustanis) – 3,000 (including peasants)

Casualties and losses
Unknown	300 – 500

The Battle of Balakot was the final battle fought between the Sikh forces under prince Sher Singh and mujahideen under Syed Ahmad Barelvi at Balakot on 6 May 1831. Barelvi had declared jihad against the Sikhs and had made Peshawar Valley the centre of his Tariqah-i-Muhammadiyah movement. After the betrayal and massacre of his companions on the hands of Pashtun tribesmen in November 1830, Barelvi left Peshawar and shifted to Hazara, intending to move to the Kashmir Valley. Sher Singh besieged the Balakot Valley where Barelvi was encamped and attacked his camp at night. The battle lasted all day. The Sikh soldiers eventually killed Syed Ahmad Barelvi, along with Shah Ismail Dehlvi and several hundreds of his followers.

== Background ==
Syed Ahmed Barelvi was a 19th-century Muslim reformist from Rai Bareli. In 1826, Barelvi declared jihad against the expanding Sikh kingdom of Ranjit Singh, and migrated with eleven hundred of his followers to the Peshawar Valley, where he announced the establishment of an Islamic state. The Pashtun maliks and khans were initially supportive of his movement against the Sikhs, and by 1830 Barelvi had brought whole of Peshawar Valley, including the city of Peshawar, as well as parts of Hazara under his administration. However Pashtuns soon became wary of the introduction of practices such as remarrying of widows, banning of taking bride price, as well as taxation, and as a result of conspiracy, hundreds of his followers were killed and assassinated across the region. (Note: The range of Mujahideen killed is given by different sources between 200 and 1000.) This incident shattered hopes of Barelvi of establishing a foothold in Peshawar and he decided to move with remaining mujahideen to Kashmir, but was confronted by the Sikh army under Sher Singh at Balakot.

== Battle ==
On 6 May 1831, Syed Ahmad Barelvi's mujahideen forces prepared for the final battle at Balakot in the mountainous valley of Mansehra. Sikh troops under Sher Singh started landing at Balakot. The Sikh forces were superior in number and training to the Mujahideen. They had warned Syed Ahmad that they would execute him and his followers if they did not surrender, to which Syed Ahmed refused. Sikhs quickly besieged the valley on all sides.

During the fight, Barelvi was killed by the Sikhs. A large group of mujahideen did not realize that Syed Ahmad had been killed and went in search of him. Besides, small groups of mujahideen were killed while fighting in different places. In the battle, Shah Ismail Dehlvi was also killed by the Sikh soldiers.

== Aftermath ==
The details of aftermath are disputed. According to Altaf Qadir after the battle Shah Ismail and Arbab Behram Khan were buried in the battlefield, while the rest of the mujahideen were buried in a mass grave. After the identification of Ahmed Barelvi's body Sher Singh ordered his burial. However after his departure, the Sikhs dug up his grave and threw the body into the Kunhar River, where it was never found again. According to Hari Ram Gupta, head of body of Ahmed Barelvi was cut for display and the bodies of the rest of mujahideen was set on fire by the Sikhs.

After this major victory, the Sikhs turned attention towards capturing Peshawar from the Afghans, and ultimately Peshawar became part of Sikh Empire in 1834.

== See also ==
- Battle of Akora Khattak
- Battle of Shaidu
- Battle of Haidru (1828)
