= Peshawar Valley =

Valley in Khyber Pakhtunkhwa, Pakistan

The Peshawar Valley (Note: Pashto: د لوی پېښور وادي; Urdu: وادئ پشاور) is a broad valley situated in the central part of the Khyber Pakhtunkhwa province of Pakistan. The valley is 7,176 km^{2} (2,771 sq mi) in area, and is traversed by the Kabul River. It has a mean elevation of 345 metres (1,132 ft). It is heavily populated. The five most populous cities in the valley are Peshawar, Mardan, Swabi, Charsadda, and Nowshera.

== Geography ==
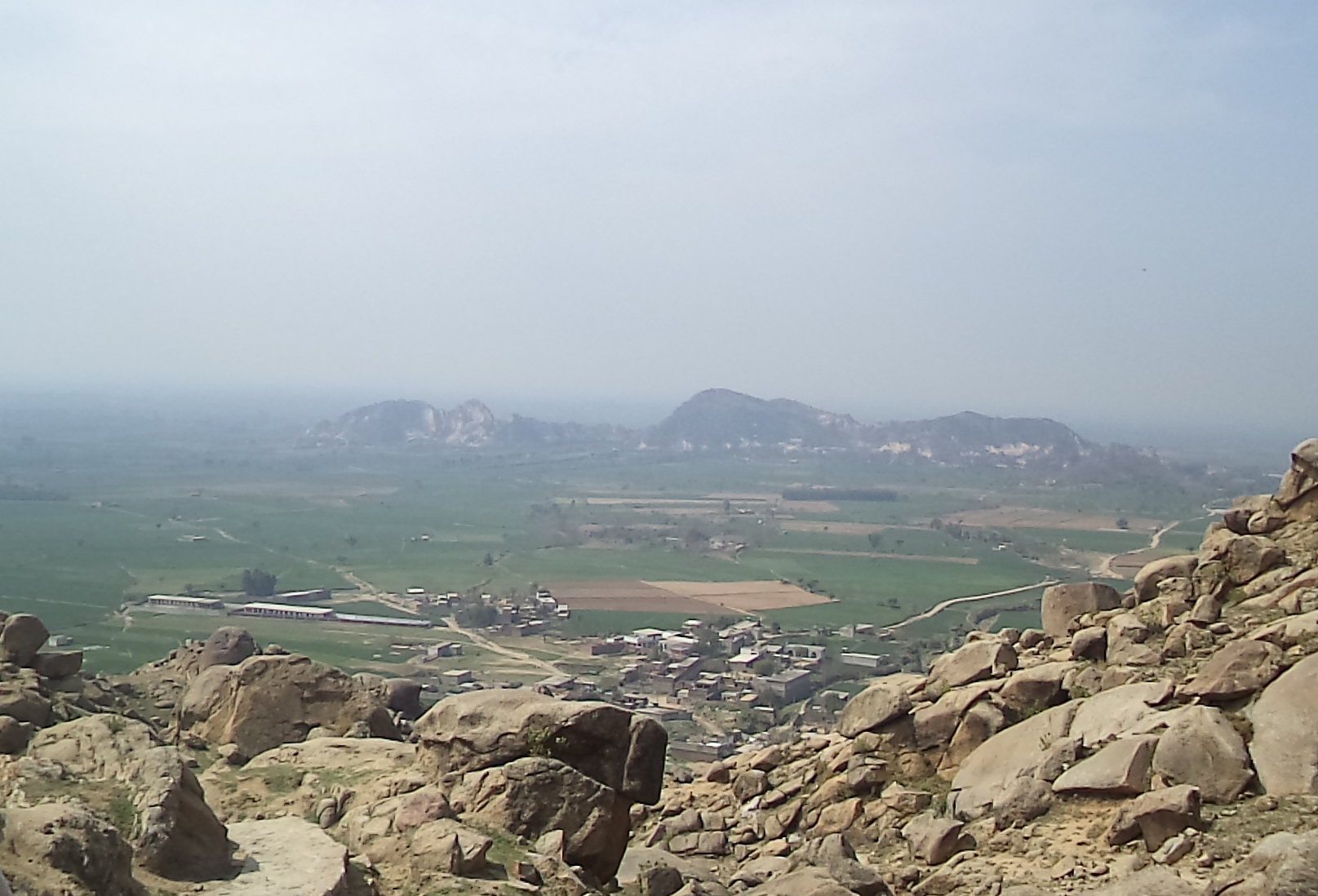
Peshawar Valley as viewed from Ranigat

The Peshawar Valley is connected to the north with Swat River Valley in the southern offshoots of Hindu Kush while to the east it is bounded by Indus River which separates it from Pothohar Plateau. To the west of the valley lies the Khyber Pass in the Safed Koh Range which connects it to Kabul Valley in Afghanistan while Kohat Pass in Kohat Range connects it to the Kohat District in the south.

== History ==
In 630 CE, Xuanzang visited the Peshawar Valley, and mentioned two stupas built by Ashoka, one of them around (20 li) 6.4 km northeast of (Pa-lu-sha) Sahri Bahlol, which he said was located on "Mount Tan-to-lo-ka," Takht-i-Bāhi hill.

== Administration ==
The valley takes its name from the city of Peshawar, which is situated at the western part of the valley close to Warsak Dam. Following districts of Khyber Pakhtunkhwa are completely located in the Peshawar Valley:

- Charsadda District (population: 1,616,198)
- Mardan District (population: 2,373,061)
- Peshawar District (population: 4,269,079)

In addition, most of Nowshera District, most of Swabi District, and smaller portions of Khyber (including Jamrud), Mohmand, Malakand, and Frontier Region Peshawar are also located in the Peshawar Valley.
