= Syed Abul Fazal Sultan Ahmad =

Bengali Sufi saint (1909–1984)

Sultan al-Awliya Syed Abul Fazal Sultan Ahmad Chandrapuri
- সৈয়দ আবুল ফজল সুলতান আহমদ
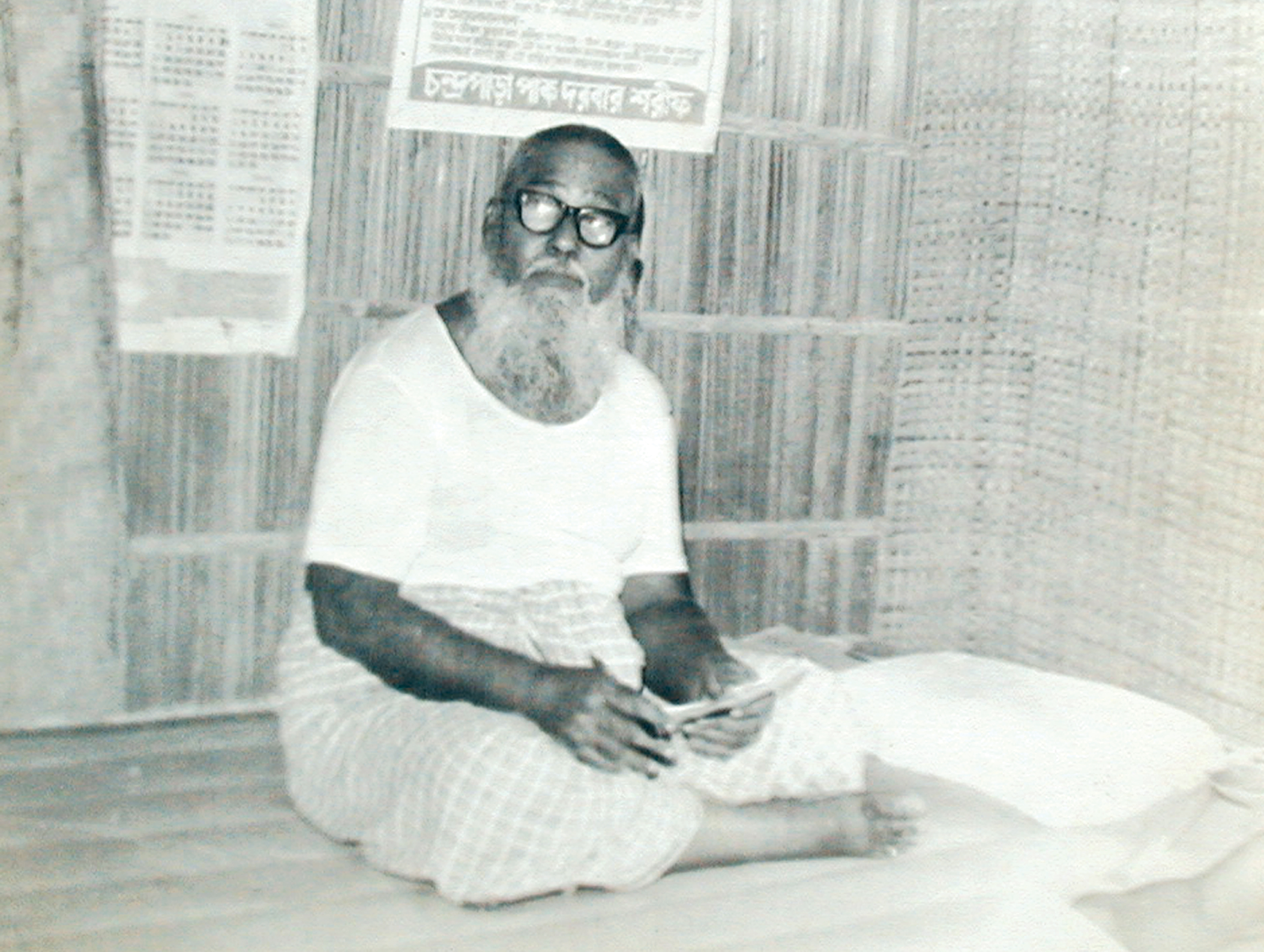
- Chandrapuri in late 1970s

Personal life
- Born: February 25, 1909 Faridpur District, Eastern Bengal and Assam, British India
- Died: March 28, 1984 (aged 75) Chandrapara, Dhaukhali Union, Sadarpur Upazila, Faridpur District, Dhaka Division, Bangladesh
- Resting place: Chandrapara Pak Darbar Sharif, Sadarpur Upazila, Faridpur District; 23°28′4″N 90°4′11″E
- Spouse: Chamirunnesa Khanom; Khodeza Begum
- Children: 11
- Parent(s): Syed Muhammad Qurban Ali Khan and Begum Khadiza Khatun
- Era: 20th century
- Main interest: Sufism
- Notable work(s): Nurul Asrar (Parts 1 and 2)

Religious life
- Religion: Sunni Islam
- Denomination: Sufi
- Founder of: Chandrapara Pak Darbar Sharif
- Philosophy: Sufism
- Jurisprudence: Hanafi
- Tariqa: Naqshbandi-Mujaddidi; Sultania-Mujaddidi

Senior posting
- Predecessor: Khwaja Yunus Ali Enayetpuri
- Successor: Syed Mahbub E Khoda Dewanbagi
- Arabic name
- Personal (Ism): Sayyid Abul Fazal Sultan Ahmad سيد أبو الفضل سلطان أحمد
- Patronymic (Nasab): Sayyid Muhammad Qurban Ali Khan سيد محمد قربان علي خان
- Epithet (Laqab): Sultan al-Awliya سلطان الأولياء
- Toponymic (Nisba): al-Chāndrāpurī الشاندرابور

Syed Abul Fazal Sultan Ahmad (Bengali: সৈয়দ আবুল ফজল সুলতান আহমদ; 1909–1984), also known as Chandrapuri according to his birthplace, was a Bangladeshi Sufi saint, spiritual leader and Islamic scholar. He is most widely recognized as the founder of Chandrapara Pak Darbar Sharif in the Faridpur district and as the spiritual guide (Murshīd) of the late Syed Mahbub E Khoda Dewanbagi, the founder of Dewanbag Sharif.

== Titles ==
He is widely revered by his followers as Sultan al-Awliya and the Imam of the Sultania-Mujaddidi Tariqa (a Sufi order).

His nisba al-Chāndrāpurī or Chandrapuri indicates his origin from Chandrapara village in Dhaukhali Union under Sadarpur upazila of Faridpur district.

== Early life and education ==
Ahmad was born in 1909 in Chandrapara village of Faridpur District, Eastern Bengal and Assam, British India. His father was Syed Muhammad Qurban Ali Khan and his mother was Begum Khadiza Khatun. His maternal grand-father was Mohammad Amin Uddin Munshi.

His ancestors came to Bengal region from distant Arabia via Anatolia and first settled in Chittagong. Then they went to Faridpur and settled first in Kishtpur village and later in Dashajar village. Finally, they settled in Chandrapara village.

Ahmad studied at Rajachar Madrasa in Faridpur for 6 years. He then studied at Osmania Madrasa in Chandpur, Kamranga Madrasa in Matlab, and finally Hammadia Madrasa in Dhaka.

== Religious leadership and teaching ==
Ahmad belonged to the Naqshbandi-Mujaddidi spiritual lineage. He was a disciple (khalifa) of the renowned Sufi saint Khwaja Yunus Ali Enayetpuri of Sirajganj. He later introduced the Sultania-Mujaddidi order.

His teachings focused heavily on Tazkiyah-e-Nafs (self-purification), Zikar-e-Qalbi (Heart awakening), and the strict observance of Islamic rituals combined with spiritual devotion (Marifat).

== Religious Career ==
He established the Chandrapara Pak Darbar Sharif in the Faridpur district. This institution serves as a center for spiritual learning and currently draws thousands of devotees, particularly during the annual Urs (religious gathering commemorating a saint's demise).

== Personal life ==
Ahmad's first wife was named Chamirunnesa Khanom. They had five daughters. Their fourth daughter, Syeda Hamida Begum, was married to Syed Mahbub-e-Khoda, the chief caliph of Ahmad.

Ahmad's second wife was named Khodeza Begum. They had five daughters and one son. Their son Syed Qamaruzzaman is acting pīr of Chandrapara Pak Darbar Sharif.

== Death and burial ==
Ahmad died in his Darbar Sharif on March 28, 1984. He was buried in the Darbar Sharif he established.

== Writings and publications ==
Ahmad has authored books on Sufism in Bengali. Notable works include:

=== Books ===
- Nurul Asrar (Parts 1 and 2)
- Hakkul Yakin
- Sultaniya Khabnama

== Legacy ==
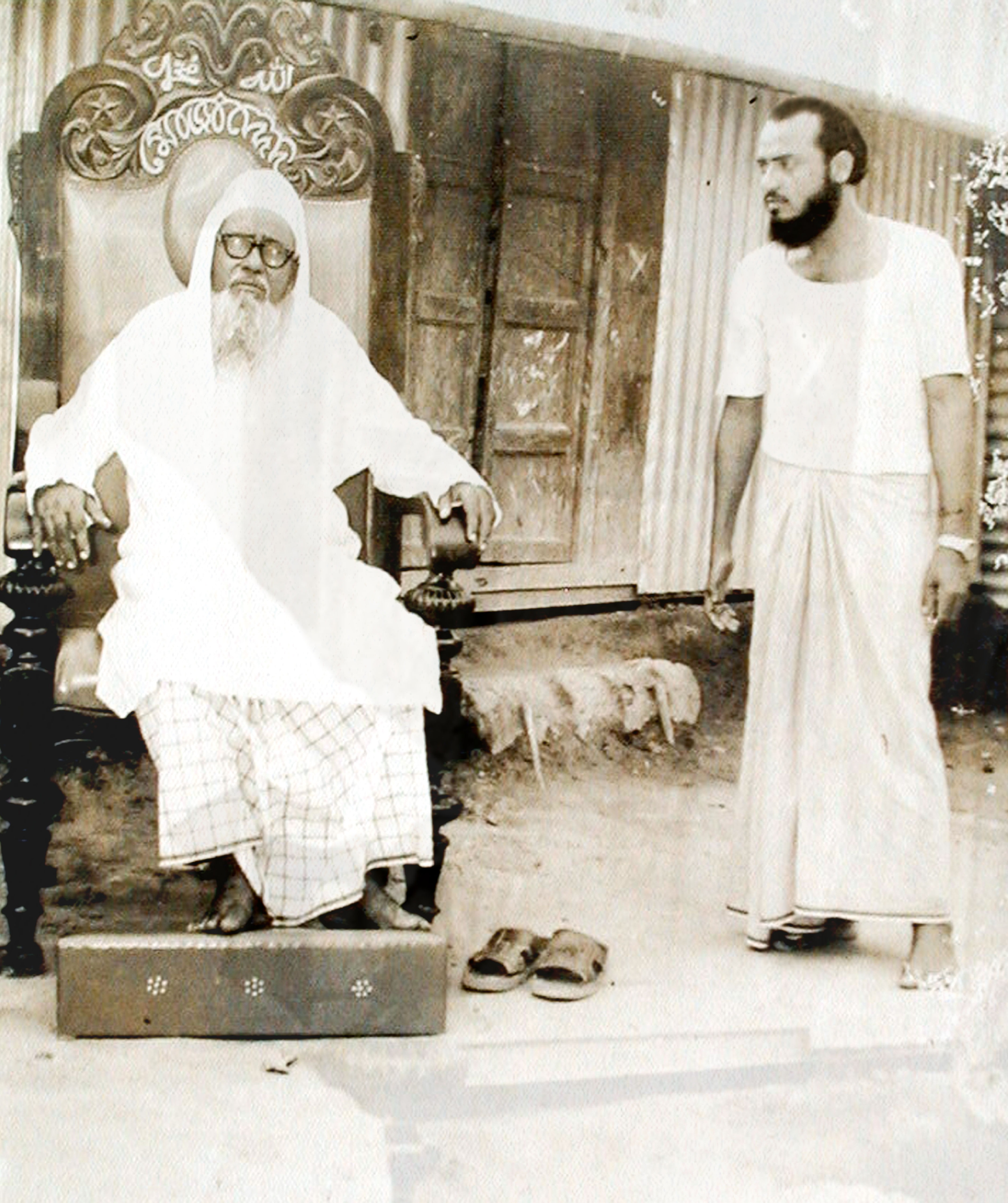
Ahmad with his chief caliph Syed Mahbub E Khoda.

His demise anniversary (Urs) is a major event at the Chandrapara Darbar, usually celebrated in January (often mid-January) each year, attracting a large number of followers from Bangladesh.

He is credited with spreading the teachings of the Naqshbandi-Mujaddidi order extensively in the region, emphasizing the "Dhikr" of Allah within the heart (Qalb). He is credited with being a "reformer of the age" in the context of Sufi traditions in Bangladesh. He later established the Sultania-Mujaddidi Tariqah (spiritual order).

His chief caliph and successor, Syed Mahbub E Khoda Dewanbagi (founder of Dewanbag Sharif), organized 8 World Sufi Conferences from 1989 to 1996 and 20 World Ashek-e-Rasul (PBUH) Conferences from 1997 to 2018 to commemorate his birth anniversary.

=== Naqshbandi Sufism ===
Naqshbandi Sufis claim that Sultan Ahmad is descended from a long line of "spiritual masters" which were claimed by the order:

1. Muhammad, d. 11 AH, buried in al-Masjid al-Nabawī, al-Madinah al-Munawwarah, Kingdom of Saudi Arabia (570/571–632 CE).
2. Abī Bakr al-Ṣiddīq, d. 13 AH, buried in al-Masjid al-Nabawī, al-Madinah al-Munawwarah, Kingdom of Saudi Arabia (573–634 CE).
3. Salman al-Farsi, d. 35 AH, buried in Al-Mada'in, Iraq (568–653 CE).
4. Al-Qāsim ibn Muḥammad ibn Abī Bakr, d. 107 AH, buried in Medina, Saudi Arabia (668–738 CE).
5. Ja'far ibn Muhammad al-Sadiq, d. 148 AH, buried in Medina, Saudi Arabia (702–765 CE).
6. Bāyazīd Basṭāmī, d. 261 AH, buried in Bastaam, Iran (804 - 874 CE).
7. Abu 'l-Hassan Ali ibn Ahmad ibn Salmān al-Kharaqāni, d. 425 AH, buried Kharqaan, Iran (963–1033 CE).
8. Abu ali Farmadi, d. 477 AH, buried in Tous, Khorasan, Iran (1016–1084 CE).
9. Abū Yaʿqūb Yūsuf al-Hammandinā, d. 535 AH, buried in Maru, Khorasan, Iran (1048–1140 CE).
10. Abdul Khaliq Ghijduwani, d. 575 AH, buried in Ghajdawan, Bukhara, Uzbekistan.
11. Khwaja Muhammad Arif Riwgari, d. 616 AH, buried in Reogar, Bukhara, Uzbekistan.
12. Khwaja Mahmood al-Anjir al-Faghnawi, d. 715 AH, buried in Waabakni, Mawarannahr, Uzbekistan (1231–1317 CE).
13. Azizan Ali Ramitani, d. 715 AH, buried in Khwarezm, Bukhara, Uzbekistan (1194–1315 CE).
14. Mohammad as-Samasi, d. 755 AH, buried in Samaas, Bukhara, Uzbekistan (1195–1257 CE).
15. Sayyid Shams ud-Dīn Amir Kulāl, d. 772 AH, buried in Saukhaar, Bukhara, Uzbekistan (1278–1370 CE).
16. Imam Baha' al-Din Naqshband Bukhari, d. 791 AH, buried in Qasr-e-Aarifan, Bukhara, Uzbekistan (1318–1389 CE).
17. Sayyid Alauddin Attar Bukhari, buried in Jafaaniyan, Mawranahar, Uzbekistan (1338–1402 CE).
18. Yaʿqūb ibn ʿUthmān ibn Maḥmūd al-Charkhī, d. 851 AH, buried in Dushanbe, Tajikistan (1360–1447 CE).
19. Nāṣir ad-Dīn ʿUbaydullāh ibn Maḥmūd ibn Shihāb ad-Dīn Khwaja Ahrar, d. 895 AH, buried in Samarkand, Uzbekistan (1404–1490 CE).
20. Muhammad Zahid Wakhshi, d. 936 AH, buried in Wakhsh, Malk Hasaar, Tajikistan (1448–1530 CE).
21. Khwaja Darwish Muhammad, d. 970 AH, buried in Samarkand, Uzbekistan (1443–1562 CE).
22. Khwaja Muhammad Amkanagi, d. 1008 AH, buried in Akang, Bukhara, Uzbekistan.
23. Khwaja Muhammad Baqi Billah, d. 1012 AH, buried in Delhi, India (1564–1603 CE).
24. Imam Ahmad al-Farūqī al-Sirhindī Mūjaddīd al-Alf al-Thanī, d. 1034 AH, buried in Sirhindi, Punjab, India (1564–1624 CE).
25. Sayyid Adam Banuri, d. 1053 AH, buried in Jannat al-Baqī, al-Madinah al-Munawwarah, Kingdom of Saudi Arabia (1503–1643 CE).
26. Sayyid Abdullah Akbarabadi, buried in Agra, India.
27. ʿAbd-ur-Rahim al-ʿUmari ad-Dehlawi, d. 1131 AH, buried in Delhi, India (1644–1719 CE).
28. Qutb ud-Din Ahmad ibn ʿAbd-ur-Rahim al-ʿUmari ad-Dehlawi, d. 1176 AH, buried in Delhi, India (1703–1762).
29. Shah Abdul Aziz Muhaddith Dehlavi, d. 1239 AH, buried in Delhi, India (1746–1824 CE).
30. Sayyid Ahmad Shahid Barelvi, d. 1246 AH, buried in Balakot, Pakistan (1786–1831 CE).
31. Noor Muhammad Nizampuri, d. 1275 AH, buried in Chattogram, Bangladesh (1790–1858 CE).
32. Sayyid Fateh Ali Waisi, d. 1303/04 AH, buried in Kolkata, India (1820–1886 CE).
33. Sayyid Wazed Ali Mehedibagi, d. 1338 AH, buried in Kolkata, India (1854–1919 CE).
34. Khwaja Yunus Ali Enayetpuri, d. 1371 AH, buried in Sirajganj, Bangladesh (1886–1952 CE).
35. Imam Sayyid Abul Fazal Sultan Ahmad Chandrapuri (subject of this article), d. 1404 AH, buried in Faridpur, Bangladesh (1909–1984 CE).

== Controversies ==
Some critics of Ahmad have questioned certain aspects of his religious teachings and legacy. In writings circulated on Islamic commentary platforms, detractors have characterized particular doctrinal statements attributed to his followers as deviating from mainstream interpretations of Islamic theology, particularly regarding the nature of angelic beings and spiritual hierarchies; these critiques describe such views as inconsistent with orthodox Sunni belief, though supporters of Ahmad reject these characterizations and emphasize his role within the Naqshbandi-Mujaddidi Sufi tradition.

== See also ==
- Syed Wazed Ali
- Yunus Ali
- Syed Mahbub E Khoda
- Arsafm Qudrat E Khoda
- Dewanbag Sharif
