= Yunus Ali =

Bengali Muslim Sufi saint (1886–1952)

Khawaja Yunus Ali Enayetpuri
- খাঁজা ইউনুস আলী এনায়েতপুরী
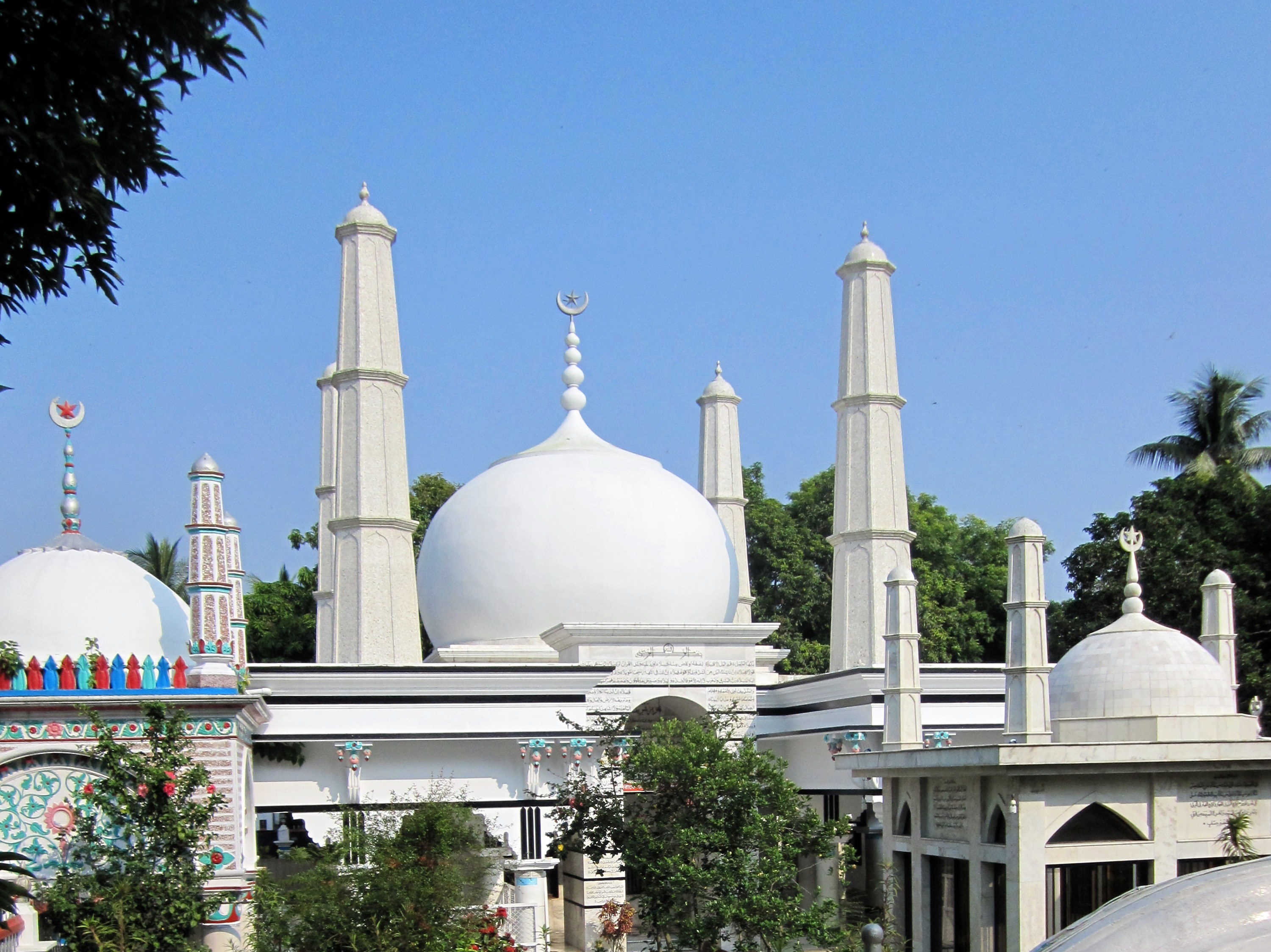

Personal life
- Born: September 10, 1886 Enayetpur, Sirajganj, Pabna District, Bengal Presidency
- Died: March 2, 1952 (aged 65) East Bengal, Pakistan
- Resting place: Enayetpur Pak Darbar Sharif, Bangladesh
- Main interest: Sufism
- Notable work(s): Shariyater Alo (The Light of Sharia) and Ganj-e-Asrar (The City of Mystery)

Religious life
- Religion: Sunni Islam
- Denomination: Sufi
- Philosophy: Sufism
- Jurisprudence: Hanafi
- Tariqa: Mujaddidi

Senior posting
- Predecessor: Syed Wazed Ali Mehedibagi
- Successor: Syed Abul Fazal Sultan Ahmad Chandrapuri
- Arabic name
- Personal (Ism): Yūnus ʿAlī يونس علي
- Patronymic (Nasab): ibn ʿAbd al-Karīm بن عبد الكريم
- Epithet (Laqab): Khawājah ʾInāyatfūrī خواجه عنايتفوري
- Toponymic (Nisba): al-ʾInāyatfūrī العنايتفوري

Yunus Ali (Bengali: ইউনুস আলী; 1886–1952), also known as Khawaja Yunus Ali Enayetpuri according to his birthplace, was an Islamic Sufi saint. He was one of the most influential Sufis in Bangladesh in the 20th century. His followers numbered in the hundreds of thousands. A number of khanqahs are operated by his successors, including Bangladesh's largest Khanqahs and also the Ajadia Pak Darbar Sharif (আজাদীয়া পাক দরবার শরীফ), located in Sirajganj city.

== Early life ==
Yunus was born on the 11th of the month of Dhu al-Hijjah in 1303 AH, 21st Kartik in 1293 BS and 10th September 1886 AD in Gregorian calendar. His father was Shah Abdul Karim and his mother was Tahmina Begum. He was the eldest among two brothers and one sister. He studied from the age of 17 for 18 years under Syed Wazed Ali in Calcutta. He studied from the age of 17 for 18 years under Syed Wazed Ali in Calcutta. He is believed to have been descended from Sayyids from Baghdad, but the records were destroyed in a fire on Chaitra 26, 1330 (1924 AD).

== Teachings ==
Khwaja's teachings focused on Tajalli, divine illumination, and his followers numbered in the hundreds of thousands. Khwaja Enayetpuri developed a tripartite teaching method, "by writing", "by lecture" and "by khanqah".

His Sufi order influences and is influenced by four other Sufi orders: Qadiri, Chishti, Naqshbandi and Mujaddidi, with special influence from Naqshbandi-Mujaddidi sub-order and he is specifically credited with introducing the Mujaddidi order to Bangladesh. A Sufi revival in then-East Pakistan is attributed to Khwaja's outreach to Muslims skeptical of Sufism, including his work reconciling Sharia and Sufism (tariqa). He wrote two books, Shariyater Alo (The Light of Sharia) and Ganje Asrar (The City of Mystery) about Sharia and Sufism respectively.

== Death ==
Yunus died on 2 March 1952 AD (18 Falgun 1358 BS).

== Legacy ==
The institutions Khwaja Yunus Ali University and Khwaja Yunus Ali Medical College are named after Khwaja. The institutions were founded by a follower and son-in-law of Khwaja's, M. M. Amjad Hussain, with the location of the medical college having been purportedly selected by Khwaja during his lifetime. A ro-ro ferry is also named after Khwaja, the M/F “ENAYETPURI”.

Khanqahs (Sufi centres) in Bangladesh dedicated to Khwaja Enayetpuri and established by his devotees include:

- The Enayetpur Darbar Sharif, the initial khanqah, established by Khwaja himself, and the largest of all khanqahs in Bangladesh. This Sufi Centre is widely known as "Biswa Shanti Manzil" (The World Peace Centre).
- The Shambhuganj Darbar Sharif in Mymensingh
- The Biswa Zaker Manzil (The World Zaker Centre, established in Atroshi by the pir of Atroshi, and one of the largest khanqahs founded by Khwaja's disciples)
- The Chandra Para Darbar Sharif in Faridpur (established by Syed Abul Fazal Sultan Ahmad Chandrapuri)
- The Paradise Para Darbar Sharif in Tangail founded by Mowlana Makim Uddin, one of the closest disciples of Khwaja Enayetpuri.
- Murshidpur Darbar Sharif in Jamalpur
- Ajadia Pak Darbar Sharif

founded by Imamul Arefin Mawlana Syed Alawddin Al Ajadi Naqshabandi Mujaddedi (R), Shirajganj city (Victoria Quarter) . (Where the true knowledge of the silsila is shining its light) Current teacher : Rehamnaye Tariqwat Mawlana Syed Abdur Rajjak Al Ajadi Naqshabandi Mujaddedi.

The Enayetpur Darbar Sharif khanqah is led by the spiritual leader, Khwaja Kamal Uddin, the third son of Enayetpuri and the current sajjada nashin (Sufi master) of the khanqah. Khwaja Kamal Uddin is an authority on the Naqshbandi and Mujaddidi orders. He succeeded his brothers Khwaja Hasim Uddin and Khwaja Mozammel Huq, former sajjada nashin at the khanqah.

=== Naqshbandi Sufism ===
Naqshbandi Sufis claim that Yunus Ali is descended from a long line of "spiritual masters" which were claimed by the order:

1. Muhammad, d. 11 AH, buried in al-Masjid al-Nabawī, al-Madinah al-Munawwarah, Kingdom of Saudi Arabia (570/571–632 CE).
2. Abī Bakr al-Ṣiddīq, d. 13 AH, buried in al-Masjid al-Nabawī, al-Madinah al-Munawwarah, Kingdom of Saudi Arabia (573–634 CE).
3. Salman al-Farsi, d. 35 AH, buried in Al-Mada'in, Iraq (568–653 CE).
4. Al-Qāsim ibn Muḥammad ibn Abī Bakr, d. 107 AH, buried in Medina, Saudi Arabia (668–738 CE).
5. Ja'far ibn Muhammad al-Sadiq, d. 148 AH, buried in Medina, Saudi Arabia (702–765 CE).
6. Bāyazīd Basṭāmī, d. 261 AH, buried in Bastaam, Iran (804 - 874 CE).
7. Abu 'l-Hassan Ali ibn Ahmad ibn Salmān al-Kharaqāni, d. 425 AH, buried Kharqaan, Iran (963–1033 CE).
8. Abu ali Farmadi, d. 477 AH, buried in Tous, Khorasan, Iran (1016–1084 CE).
9. Abū Yaʿqūb Yūsuf al-Hammandinā, d. 535 AH, buried in Maru, Khorasan, Iran (1048–1140 CE).
10. Abdul Khaliq Ghijduwani, d. 575 AH, buried in Ghajdawan, Bukhara, Uzbekistan.
11. Khwaja Muhammad Arif Riwgari, d. 616 AH, buried in Reogar, Bukhara, Uzbekistan.
12. Khwaja Mahmood al-Anjir al-Faghnawi, d. 715 AH, buried in Waabakni, Mawarannahr, Uzbekistan (1231–1317 CE).
13. Azizan Ali Ramitani, d. 715 AH, buried in Khwarezm, Bukhara, Uzbekistan (1194–1315 CE).
14. Mohammad as-Samasi, d. 755 AH, buried in Samaas, Bukhara, Uzbekistan (1195–1257 CE).
15. Sayyid Shams ud-Dīn Amir Kulāl, d. 772 AH, buried in Saukhaar, Bukhara, Uzbekistan (1278–1370 CE).
16. Imam Baha' al-Din Naqshband Bukhari, d. 791 AH, buried in Qasr-e-Aarifan, Bukhara, Uzbekistan (1318–1389 CE).
17. Sayyid Alauddin Attar Bukhari, buried in Jafaaniyan, Mawranahar, Uzbekistan (1338–1402 CE).
18. Yaʿqūb ibn ʿUthmān ibn Maḥmūd al-Charkhī, d. 851 AH, buried in Dushanbe, Tajikistan (1360–1447 CE).
19. Nāṣir ad-Dīn ʿUbaydullāh ibn Maḥmūd ibn Shihāb ad-Dīn Khwaja Ahrar, d. 895 AH, buried in Samarkand, Uzbekistan (1404–1490 CE).
20. Muhammad Zahid Wakhshi, d. 936 AH, buried in Wakhsh, Malk Hasaar, Tajikistan (1448–1530 CE).
21. Khwaja Darwish Muhammad, d. 970 AH, buried in Samarkand, Uzbekistan (1443–1562 CE).
22. Khwaja Muhammad Amkanagi, d. 1008 AH, buried in Akang, Bukhara, Uzbekistan.
23. Khwaja Muhammad Baqi Billah, d. 1012 AH, buried in Delhi, India (1564–1603 CE).
24. Imam Ahmad al-Farūqī al-Sirhindī Mūjaddīd al-Alf al-Thanī, d. 1034 AH, buried in Sirhindi, Punjab, India (1564–1624 CE).
25. Sayyid Adam Banuri, d. 1053 AH, buried in Jannat al-Baqī, al-Madinah al-Munawwarah, Kingdom of Saudi Arabia (1503–1643 CE).
26. Sayyid Abdullah Akbarabadi
27. ʿAbd-ur-Rahim al-ʿUmari ad-Dehlawi, d. 1131 AH, buried in Delhi, India (1644–1719 CE).
28. Qutb ud-Din Ahmad ibn ʿAbd-ur-Rahim al-ʿUmari ad-Dehlawi, d. 1176 AH, buried in Delhi, India (1703–1762).
29. Shah Abdul Aziz Muhaddith Dehlavi, d. 1239 AH, buried in Delhi, India (1746–1824 CE).
30. Sayyid Ahmad Shahid Barelvi, d. 1246 AH, buried in Balakot, Pakistan (1786–1831 CE).
31. Noor Muhammad Nizampuri, d. 1275 AH, buried in Chattogram, Bangladesh (1790–1858 CE).
32. Sayyid Fateh Ali Waisi, d. 1303/04 AH, buried in Kolkata, India (1820–1886 CE).
33. Sayyid Wazed Ali Mehedibagi, d. 1338 AH, buried in Kolkata, India (1854–1919 CE).
34. Khwaja Yunus Ali Enayetpuri (subject of this article), d. 1371 AH, buried in Sirajganj, Bangladesh (1886–1952 CE).
