= Mir Zahid Harawi =

17th-century Islamic scholar

- زاهد هروی

Personal life
- Born: Mughal Empire
- Died: 1101 AH (1689-1690 CE) Kabul, Mughal Empire
- Parent: Aslam Harawi (father)
- Other name: Mirza Zahid

Religious life
- Religion: Islam
- Denomination: Sunni
- School: Hanafi
- Tariqa: Naqshbandi

Muslim leader
- Based in: Kabul
- Period in office: 17th-century
- Students: Shah Abdur Rahim

Mīr Muḥammad Zāhid Harawī (Persian: میر محمد زاهد هروی; died 1689) was an Islamic scholar, historian, and chronicler. He is considered to be one of the authors of the historic Dars-i Nizami curriculum.

== Early life ==
Zahid was born in Hindustan. His father, Qadi Muhammad Aslam (d. 1651), was from Herat in and migrated to Lahore during the reign of the Mughal emperor Jahangir. The emperor was impressed with Aslam's piety and religiosity and offered him a position as the Qadi (judge) of Kabul and later of the army. The next Mughal emperor, Shah Jahan, reinstated his position as Qadi and declared Aslam as his Imam-e-Khas.

Zahid's education began with his father. He studied under Mullah Muhammad Fazil Badakhshani and Mullah Sadiq Halwai in Kabul. After that, he went to Turan, where he studied under Mirza Muhammad Jan Shirazi . He studied hikmah under Shirazi's student Mullah Yusuf. Sometime after, Zahid returned to Lahore, where he studied with Mullah Jamal.

== Career ==
In Ramadan 1054 AH (July 1654), Shah Jahan appointed him as the chronicler of Kabul. Zahid remained in this position during the reign of Aurangzeb. In 1666, he was appointed as the accountant for the Mughal army. Aurangzeb later appointed him to the presidency of Kabul. While serving as the army accountant in Akbarabad, Zahid continued to teach Islamic studies. He taught the science of rationality to Shah Abdur Rahim. Towards the end of his life, Zahid started to focus more on teaching and retired from his imperial employment. Some of his students travelled from faraway places, such as Muhammad Salih of Bengal.

Harawi was a relative of Masum Sirhindi (son of Ahmad Sirhindi) of the Naqshbandi order and was one of his successors (Khalifa). Shah Waliullah Dehlawi praised Harawi for his piety in his work Anfas-ul-Arifin. ' Abd al-Haqq al-Dehlawi notes that Harawi had great confidence in the wisdom of Waliullah's father Shah Abdur Rahim on matters of jurisprudence.

== Works ==
Harawi wrote several hashiyas(glossary) such as Hashiya Sharh Muwaqif, Hashiya Sharh Tahzeeb Allama Dwani, Hashiya Risala Qutbuddin Razi, and Hashiya Sharh Hayakal.

== Death ==
Harawi died in 1101 AH (1689-1690 CE) in Kabul.

== Bibliography ==
- Rahi, Akhtar (1978). "Mir Muhammad Zahid Harawi". تذکرہ منصنفین درس نظامی [Discussing the authors of Dars-i-Nizami] (in Urdu). Lahore: Maktabah Rahmaniyah. pp. 234–237. OCLC 793843738.
- Nasr, Seyyed Hossein (1996). Routledge History of World Philosophies. Vol. 1. Taylor & Francis. p. 1067.
