= Qudrat-e-Khoda =

Qudrat-e-Khoda or Qudrat-e-khuda may refer to:

- Arsafm Qudrat E Khoda (born 1985), Islamic scholar, Sufi spiritual figure, and religious leader associated with Dewanbag Sharif.
- Muhammad Qudrat-i-Khuda (1900–1977), Bangladeshi scientist, educator, and author known for his contributions to chemistry and science education.

== See also ==
- Khuda
