= Madrasah-i Rahimiyah =

Madrasa in Delhi, India

- Type: Islamic Theology
- Established: 17th century
- Affiliations: Naqshbandi Sufism, Hanafi school
- Location: Delhi, India

The Madrasah-i Rahimiyah is an Islamic seminary located in Delhi, India. It was founded by Shah Abdur Rahim, the father of Shah Waliullah Dehlawi, during the reign of Mughal Emperor Aurangzeb. After the death of Shah Abdur Rahim in 1718 Shah Waliullah started teaching at the Madrasah. It became a leading institute of Islamic learning and was acknowledged as the most influential seminary in the Indian subcontinent. Later, when Shah Wali Allah died, his sons Shah Abdul Aziz, Shah Rafi and Shah Abdul Qader began teaching here, with Abdul Aziz becoming its principal. Following the death of Abdul Aziz, the leadership of the Madrasah passed on to his grandson Shah Muhammad Ishaq.

Due to British rage against Muslims, after the revolt of 1857, the British authorities ordered the closing of Madarsah-i-Rahimiya and sold it to a Hindu businessman.

== Alumni ==
- Shah Waliullah Dehlawi
- Shah Abdul Aziz Dehlavi
- Shah Muhammad Ishaq
- Fazl-e-Haq Khairabadi
- Sadruddin Khan Azurda Dehlawi

== See also ==
- Darul Uloom Deoband
- Al Jamiatul Ashrafia
- Al-Jame-atul-Islamia
