= Syed Wazed Ali =

Bengali Muslim Sufi saint

Qutub-ul-Ershad Syed Wazed Ali Mehedibagi
- سيد واجد علي

Personal life
- Born: c. unknown Faridpur, Bengal Presidency
- Died: November 9, 1919 Calcutta, Bengal Presidency
- Resting place: 9/1, Ram Mohan Bera Lane, Kolkata-700046
- Main interest: Sufism

Religious life
- Religion: Sunni Islam
- Denomination: Sufi
- Philosophy: Sufism
- Jurisprudence: Hanafi
- Tariqa: Naqshbandi (Mujaddidi)

Senior posting
- Predecessor: Fateh Ali Waisi
- Successor: Yunus Ali Enayetpuri
- Arabic name
- Personal (Ism): Wāzed Alī واجد علي
- Patronymic (Nasab): ibn ʿBāsrat Alī ابن بصرات علي
- Epithet (Laqab): Qūtūb-ūl Ershād قطب الإرشاد
- Toponymic (Nisba): al-Mehedībāghī المهدي باغي

Syed Wazed Ali (Quddisa Sirruhu al-'Aziz) was a Bengali Sufi saint and preacher of Islam. He was one of the 35 caliphs or spiritual successors of Fateh Ali Waisi.

== Early life ==
Wazed Ali was born in Faridpur. His father's name was Syed Basrat Ali. His father was also a Sufi saint. His father was related to the Nawab family of Dhaka. The Nawab family of Dhaka donated a house in Kolkata in honor of Syed Basrat Ali. The Mughal emperors of Delhi gifted 12,000 bighas of land to their ancestors. Wazed Ali was a disciple of the renowned Sufi saint Fateh Ali Waisi and later became Waisi's caliph.

== Religious career ==
Wazed Ali established his Darbar Sharif in Mehedibag, Kolkata. That is why Mehedibagi is added to the end of his name. After establishing Darbar Sharif, he tried to guide the common Muslims in Pabna, Rangpur, Dinajpur, Bogra, Rajshahi, Faridpur regions. A large number of people from different districts became his disciples.

== Death and burial ==
Wazed Ali died on Tuesday, November 9, 1919, at 7:00 PM, according to the 17th Safar of 1338 AH. He was buried at his home in Gobra Bagh in Calcutta, where his mausoleum is located.

== Legacy ==
Wazed Ali had several caliphs. Among them, Zahurul Haque, Yunus Ali Enayetpuri, Dr Muhammad Kohorullah of Ramshahar, Bogura, Kazem Uddin Talukdar of Sarail, Joypurhat, Abdur Rahim of Dinajpur, Ahmed Ali Mujaddidi of Greater Pabna, and Jamshed Ali Bogra were well known. One of his caliphs, Yunus Ali, established the Enayetpur Pak Darbar Sharif in Sirajganj district.

Yunus Ali (Wajed Ali's caliph) had several famous caliphs. Among them were Khwaja Hashmat Ullah, the founder of the Atrashi Bishwa Zaker Manzil in Faridpur, Syed Abul Fazal Sultan Ahmad, the founder of Chandrapara Pak Darbar Sharif in Faridpur. Syed Mahbub-e-Khoda Dewanbagi, the founder of Dewanbag Sharif, was the son-in-law and caliph of Syed Abul Fazal Sultan Ahmad.
