= Khwaja Yunus Ali University =

Public University in Bangladesh

Coordinates: 24.2243°N 89.7057°E

- খাজা ইউনুস আলী বিশ্ববিদ্যালয়
- Other name: KYAU
- Motto: Quest for knowledge
- Type: University
- Affiliations: University Grants Commission (Bangladesh)
- Chairman: Mohammad Yusuf
- Chancellor: President of Bangladesh
- Vice-Chancellor: Hossain Reza
- Dean: Abdullah Akhter Ahmed (Medical); M.A. Mannan (School of Business)
- Location: Enayetpur, Sirajganj, Rajshahi, Bangladesh
- Website: www.kyau.edu.bd

Khwaja Yunus Ali University is a private university in Bangladesh. It is situated in Enayetpur, Sirajganj, Rajshahi. It was founded in 2012 under Private University Act, and named after Sufi saint Khwaja Yunus Ali (also known as Khwaja Enayetpuri).

== Undergraduate programs ==
=== Faculty of Science & Engineering ===
- Bachelor of Science in Computer Science & Engineering
- Bachelor of Science in Information and Communications Technology
- Bachelor of Science in Mechatronics and Micromechatronics Engineering
- Bachelor of Science in Electrical & Electronics Engineering
- Bachelor of Science in Information & Communication Technology
- Bachelor of Science in Electrical & Telecommunication Engineering Engineering

=== Faculty of Business Studies ===
- Bachelor of Management Information Systems (MIS)
- Bachelor of Business Administration (BBA)

=== Faculty of Bio-medical Science ===
- Bachelor of Science in Pharmacy
- Bachelor of Science in Microbiology
- Bachelor of Science in Biochemistry & Biotechnology

=== Faculty of Human Science ===
- Bachelor of Library & Information Science (LIS)
- B.A (Hon's) in English
- B.A (Hon's) in Islamic Studies

=== Faculty of Law ===
- Bachelor of Law (LLB)

== Graduate programs ==
=== Faculty of Science & Engineering ===
- M.Sc. in Mechatronics and Micro-mechatronics Engineering (M.MME)
- M.S. in Medical Physics (M.MP)

=== Faculty of Business Studies ===
- Master of Business Administration (MBA)
- Executive Masters of Business Administration (EMBA)

=== Faculty of Human Science ===
- Master of Arts in English (ELT)
- Master of Arts in Islamic Studies (M.IS)
- Master of Arts Islamic Studies (Preliminary)
- Master of Library & Information Science (M.LIS)
- Postgraduate Diploma in Library & Information Science

=== Faculty of Law ===
- Master of Law (LLM)

== Academic session ==
"KYAU" follows bi-Semester session. The schedule of an academic year will is as follows:

- Spring : January- June
- Summer : July- December

== University clubs ==
- English Language Club
- Engineering Club
- Medical Club
- Sports Club
- Debate Club
- Social and Cultural Club
- Blood Donation Club
- Ethics Club
