= Tafsir Azizi =

18th-century Persian Quranic exegesis

- Author: Shah Abdul Aziz Dehlavi
- Original title: Fath al-‘Aziz
- Language: Persian
- Subject: Tafsir
- Genre: Religious text
- Publication date: 1208 AH (1793 CE)
- Publication place: Mughal Empire
- Media type: Print (Manuscript)

Tafsir Azizi (Persian: تفسیر عزیزی), originally titled Fath al-‘Aziz, is an 18th-century Persian tafsir (exegesis) of the Quran by the Indian Islamic scholar Shah Abdul Aziz Dehlavi (1746–1824). It is noted for its synthesis of traditional transmitted knowledge (manqūl) and rational sciences (ma‘qūl), marking a significant development in the intellectual history of South Asian Islam.

== Methodology and features ==
The work employs an interdisciplinary approach, integrating theological, linguistic, and philosophical discourse. Departing from the strictly legalistic or mystical focus common in contemporary works, Tafsir Azizi engages with:

- Linguistic and rhetorical analysis: Dehlavi explores the internal coherence of the Quranic text and addresses the concept of I'jaz al-Qur'an (the inimitability of the Quran). He specifically analyzes why certain narratives are repeated with varying linguistic structures across different chapters.
- Thematic and spiritual depth: The commentary provides detailed expositions on the underlying wisdom of the verses, aiming to engage the reader both intellectually and spiritually.
- Apologetics: Reflecting the challenges of the late 18th century, the text offers rebuttals to contemporary philosophical and theological objections, grounding its arguments in a blend of rational logic and classical scholarship.

== Composition and history ==
The tafsir was not written directly by Dehlavi but was dictated to his student, Musaddiq al-Din ‘Abdullah, while the author was suffering from physical illness. The dictation for the known portions was completed in 1208 AH (1793 CE).

Although the project was intended to encompass the entire Quran, only four volumes remain extant. These cover Surah al-Fatihah, the beginning of Surah al-Baqarah (up to verse 84), and the final two sections (juz’ 29 and 30). Historical accounts suggest that additional volumes may have been written but were subsequently lost or destroyed during the Indian Rebellion of 1857.

== Translations ==
To reach a broader audience in South Asia, the work has been translated from the original Persian into Urdu. A notable translation is Jawahir-e Azizi by Syed Muhammad Mahfuz al-Haq, published in Lahore by Nuriya Razaviya Publications (2008).
