= Shah Muhammad Ishaq =

Indian Muslim scholar

- شاہ محمد اسحاق

Personal life
- Born: 4 November 1783 Shahjahanabad, Mughal Empire
- Died: 20 July 1846 (aged 62) Mecca, Hejaz, Ottoman Empire
- Resting place: Jannat al-Mu'alla
- Children: Maulvi Nasiruddin Amtul, Amatul Ghafur
- Parents: Maulvi Muhammad Afdal ibn Ahmad ibn Muhammad (father); Amtul Aziz (mother)
- Occupation: Islamic scholar; Muhaddith
- Relatives: Shah Abdul Aziz (maternal-grandfather)

Religious life
- Religion: Islam

Muslim leader
- Influenced by: Shah Abdul Aziz
- Influenced: Syed Nazeer Husain, Ahmad Ali Saharanpuri

Shah Muhammad Ishaq (Note: Urdu: شاہ محمد اسحاق, romanized: Sḥāh Muḥammad Isḥāq) (4 November 1783 – 20 July 1846), was an Indian Muslim scholar with his major focus on hadith studies.

== Biography ==
Ishaq was born on 14 November 1782 in Delhi. His father was Maulvi Muhammad Afdal ibn Ahmad. His mother, Amtul Aziz (b. 1765), was the eldest daughter of Shah Abdul Aziz. He studied hadith from his grandfather Shah Abdul Aziz. He taught at the Madrasah Rahimiyya. He died on 20 July 1846 in Mecca and was buried in Jannat al-Mu'alla next to Khadija bint Khuwaylid.

His students include Ahmad Ali Saharanpuri.

He had two children. His first child was his only son, Maulvi Nasiruddin Amtul (b. 1820). His second child was his only daughter, Amatul Ghafur al-Dihlawiyya, who was the wife of Maulana ‘Abd al-Qayyum al-Burhanawi.

== Bibliography ==
- Barkātī, Maḥmūd Aḥmad. 1992. Ḥayāt-i Shāh Muḥammad Isḥāq Muḥaddis̲ Dihlavī. Dihlī: Shāh Abūlk̲h̲air Akāḍmī.
- Abdul-Hayy al-Hasani. الإعلام بمن في تاريخ الهند من الأعلام (in Arabic). p. 911.
