= Enayetpur =

- Town
- Location within Bangladesh
- Coordinates: 24°23′55″N 89°46′42″E
- Country: Bangladesh
- Division: Rajshahi
- District: Sirajganj

Area
  - Total: 4.563 km^{2} (1.762 sq mi)
- Elevation: 45 m (148 ft)

Population
  - Total: 10,231
  - Density: 2,242/km^{2} (5,807/sq mi)

Enayetpur is a town in Sirajganj District, Rajshahi Division, Bangladesh. Enayetpur lies near the banks of the river Jamuna, about 137 kilometres (85 mi) northwest of Dhaka, near the Jamuna Bridge.

== Description ==
Enayetpur is famous for an Islamic Sufi saint named Shah Sufi Khwaja Yunus Ali Enayetpuri.

Handwoven cloth produced on a loom is a specialty of this area. Sharee or Saris (female dress) and lungis (male dress) are the main items produced. Nearby villages include Betil, Khokshabari, Khamargram, Gopalpur, Rupnai, Khukni, and Gopinathpur.

== Hospital ==
1000-bed superspecialized Khwaja Yunus Ali Medical College and Hospital provides western standard health services to sirajganj district as well the western part of Bangladesh.

== University ==
Khwaja Yunus Ali University provides higher education to sirajganj district as well the western part of Bangladesh.

== Focus on astronomy ==
Enayetpur is the location of Enayetpur High School. The opening ceremonies of the International Year in Astronomy (2009) were held at this school in April 2009. Astronomy related events are held annually in Enayetpur.
