= Shah Abdur Rahim =

Indian scholar from 17th century and founder of Madarsa Rahimiyya

- شاه عبد الرحیم

Personal life
- Born: 1644 Mughal Empire
- Died: 1719 (aged 74–75) Mughal Empire
- Resting place: Mehdiyan, Delhi Gate
- Children: Shah Waliullah
- Parent: Wajīhuddīn bin Muʿaẓẓam bin Manṣūr bin Aḥmad (father)
- Known for: Madrasa Rahimiyya; Fatawa 'Alamgiri
- Relatives: Shah Abdul Aziz (grandson)

Religious life
- Religion: Islam
- Denomination: Sunni
- School: Hanafi

Muslim leader
- Teacher: Mir Zahid Harawi
- Period in office: 17th-century
- Influenced: Shah Waliullah Shah Abdul Aziz

Shah Abdur Rahim (Persian: شاه عبد الرحیم; 1644-1719) was an Islamic scholar and a writer who assisted in the compilation of Fatawa-e-Alamgiri, the voluminous code of Islamic law. He was the father of the Muslim philosopher Shah Waliullah Dehlawi. He became a disciple of Khwaja Khurd son of Khawaja Baqi Billah a revered Sufi of Delhi. He established Madrasa Rahimiyya in Delhi, a theological college which later played a part in the religious emancipation of Muslim India and became the breeding ground of religious reformers and mujahideen like Shah Waliullah and Shah Abdul Aziz.

== Early life ==
He was the son of Wajīhuddīn bin Muʿaẓẓam bin Manṣūr bin Aḥmad bin Maḥmūd. His paternal lineage traces back to that of Umar ibn Al-Khattab. He was the younger brother of Shah Abdur Ridha (1636-1688), as well as the older brother of Shah Abdul Hakim.

== Islamic services ==
Shah Abdur Rahim was a Sufi and an Hanafi scholar who wrote works of Islamic law. He taught at the Madrasa Rahimiyya, a theological college, or seminary, that he helped establish. The institution would become an important part of the religious emancipation of Muslim's of India, as it provided a starting point for later religious reformers.

== Madrassa Rahimya ==
Madrassa Rahimya was an Islamic institute in Delhi with a developed curriculum and better teaching methodologies; in other words, it was well-established and organized. The translation of the Quran also took place in Madrassa Rahimya. After Shah Abdul Rahim, his son Shah Walliullah taught there and upgraded the curriculum. Future Islamic scholars and leaders like Syed Ahmed Shaheed Barelvi got their education from Madrassa Rahimya.

== Works ==
He was a leading scholar of traditional sciences. Some of his works include:

- 1) Fatawa-e-Alamgiri
- 2) Irshad-e-Rahimiya, a book on the Naqshbandi Sufi path
- 3) Anfas-e-Rahimiya
