= Sadarpur Upazila =

Sadarpur সদরপুর
- Upazila
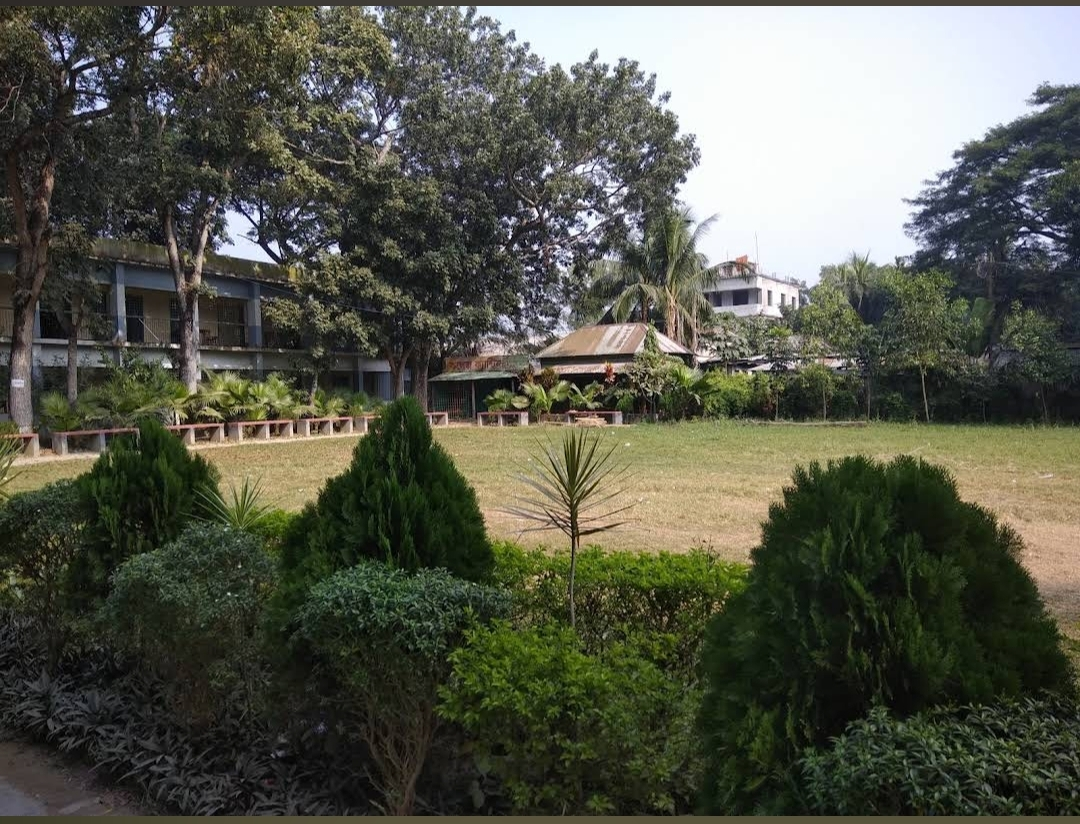
- Sadarpur Government College

- Coordinates: 23°28.6′N 90°2′E
- Country: Bangladesh
- Division: Dhaka
- District: Fardipur

Area
  - Total: 261.29 km^{2} (100.88 sq mi)

Population (2022)
  - Total: 201,511
  - Density: 771.22/km^{2} (1,997.4/sq mi)
- Time zone: UTC+6 (BST)
- Postal code: 7820
- Area code: 06328
- Website: sadarpur.faridpur.gov.bd

Sadarpur (Bengali: সদরপুর) is an upazila of Faridpur District in the Division of Dhaka, Bangladesh.

Sadarpur Upazila mauza geocode map

== Geography ==
Sadarpur is located at 23.4764°N 90.0333°E and has 40,219 households and a total area of 261.29 km^{2}.

== Demographics ==
Religions in Sadarpur Upazila (2022)
Religion	Percent
Islam	95.05%
Hinduism	4.94%
Other or not stated	0.01%

According to the 2022 Bangladeshi census, Sadarpur Upazila had 49,860 households and a population of 201,511. 9.72% of the population were under 5 years of age. Sadarpur had a literacy rate (age 7 and over) of 68.95%: 69.58% for males and 68.40% for females, and a sex ratio of 88.89 males for every 100 females. 18,201 (9.03%) lived in urban areas.

As of the 2011 Census of Bangladesh, Sadarpur upazila had 40,219 households and a population of 186,254. 46,229 (24.82%) were under 10 years of age. Sadarpur had an average literacy rate of 43.18%, compared to the national average of 51.8%, and a sex ratio of 1077 females per 1000 males. 6,076 (3.26%) of the population lived in urban areas.

== Administration ==
Sadarpur Upazila is divided into nine union parishads: Akter Char, Bhashanchar, Char Bishnupur, Char Manair, Char Nasirpur, Dheukhali, Krishnapur, Narikelbaria, and Sadarpur. The union parishads are subdivided into 88 mauzas and 328 villages.

The postal code is 7820.

== See also ==
- Upazilas of Bangladesh
- Districts of Bangladesh
- Divisions of Bangladesh
