= Dewanbagi Pir =

Bengali Sufi Saint (1949–2020)

Sufi Emperor Syed Mahbub E Khoda Dewanbagi
- সৈয়দ মাহবুব এ খোদা
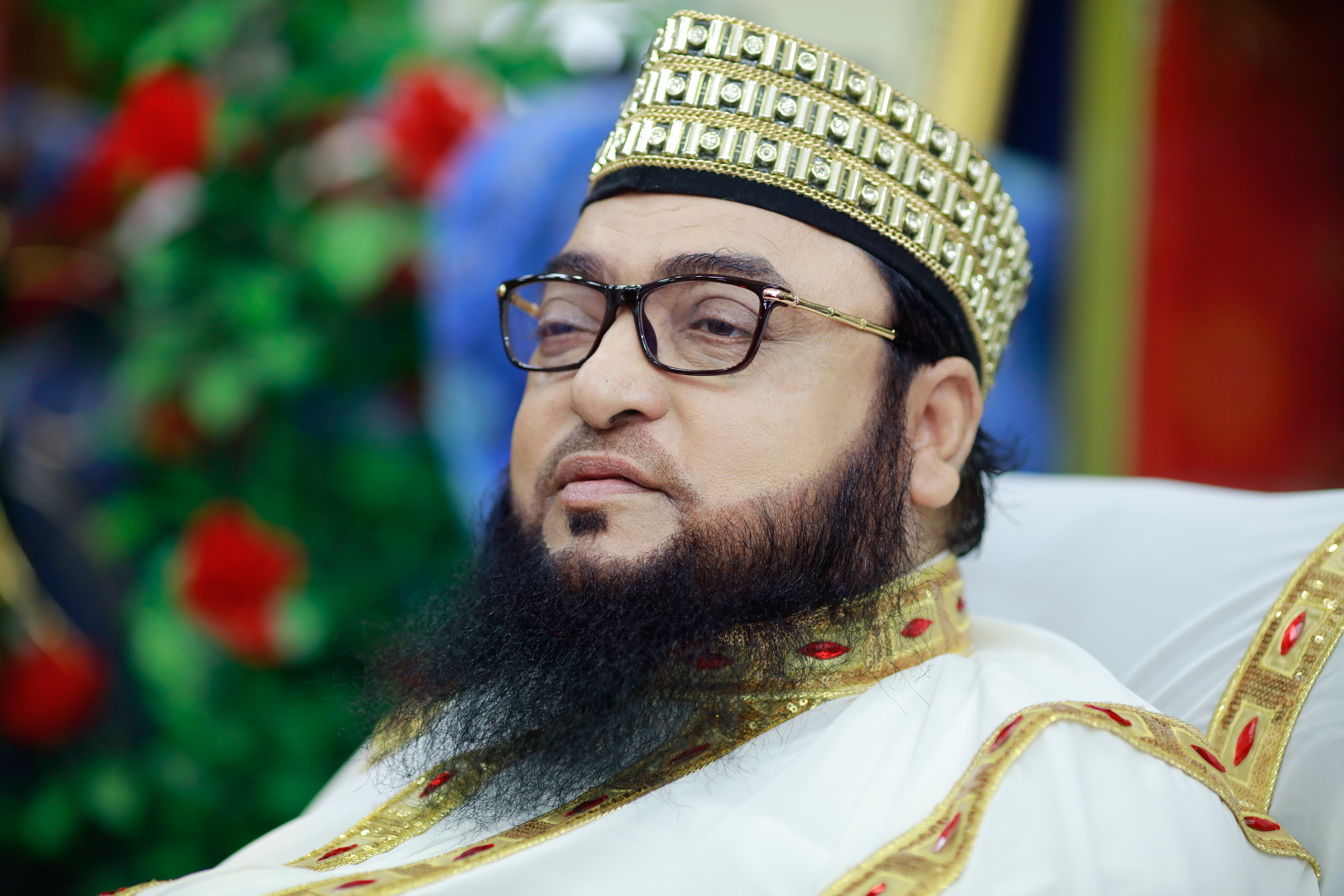
- Syed Mahbub E Khoda in 2017

Personal life
- Born: December 14, 1949 Bahadurpur, Durgapur Union, Ashuganj, Brahmanbaria, Comilla District, East Bengal
- Died: December 28, 2020 (aged 71) 147 Arambagh, Motijheel, Dhaka, Bangladesh
- Resting place: Babe Madina, Dewanbag Sharif, 143/9, South Kamalapur, Dhaka 1000; 23°43'56.95"N, 90°25'8.28"E
- Flourished: Modern Era
- Home town: Brahmanbaria
- Spouse: Syeda Hamida Begum
- Children: 7
- Parent(s): Syed Abdur Rashid Sarkar and Syeda Zobeda Khatun
- Citizenship: Bangladeshi
- Notable work: Tafseer E Sufi Samrat Dewanbagi (8 Volume)
- Other name: Dewanbagi
- Relatives: Syed Abul Fazal Sultan Ahmad Chandrapuri
- Website: dewanbagsharif.org

Religious life
- Religion: Islam
- Denomination: Sufi
- Founder of: Dewanbag Sharif
- Philosophy: Sufism

Muslim leader
- Predecessor: Syed Abul Fazal Sultan Ahmad Chandrapuri
- Successor: Arsafm Qudrat E Khoda

Military service
- Allegiance: Provisional Government of Bangladesh; Bangladesh
- Service/branch: Mukti Bahini
- Years&nsbp;of&nsbp;service: 1971–1975
- Rank: JCO
- Unit: 16 East Bengal Regiment
- Commands: Platoon Commander of Sector – III; Religious Teacher (RT) of 16 East Bengal Regiment
- Battles/wars: Bangladesh Liberation War
- Arabic name
- Personal (Ism): Maḥbūb Khudā محبوب خدا
- Patronymic (Nasab): ibn ʿAbd al-Rashīd بن عبد الرشيد
- Epithet (Laqab): Ṣūfī Samrāt صوفي سمراٹ
- Toponymic (Nisba): al-Dīwānbāghī الديوانباغي

Syed Mahbub-e-Khoda (14 December 1949 – 28 December 2020) also known as Sufi Samrat Dewanbagi or Dewanbagi Pir, was a Bangladeshi preacher of a self established school of Sufi Islam, which he called "Muhammadi Islam" and founder of Dewanbag Sharif. He had a large following across the country during his lifetime, but he was widely criticized by Islamic scholars for his beliefs and for making controversial statements about Islam and the Islamic prophets.

== Titles ==
The title Dīwānbāghī or Dewanbagi indicates his origin from Dewanbag village in Madanpur Union under Bandar upazila of Narayanganj, which is located 16 kilometers east of the capital Dhaka. He established a base in the area during his early years of preaching and declared himself as the Sufi Samrat or Sufi Emperor.

== Early life and education ==
Syed Mahbub-e-Khoda was born on 14 December 1949 at village Bahadurpur of No. 3 Durgapur Union of Ashuganj upazila in Brahmanbaria. His father was Syed Abdur Rashid Sarkar and mother was Syeda Zobeda Khatun.

Mahbub-e-Khoda began his education at Sohagpur Primary School. He later attended Talshahar Karimiya Alia Madrasa, completing his fazil degree (equivalent to a bachelor’s degree) with distinction. He served as Vice President of the Madrasa Students' Council throughout his time there.

== Military service ==
During the mass uprising of 1969, Mahbub-e-Khoda served as the president of the 'All-Party Students’ Action Committee' in the western region of Brahmanbaria, Bangladesh. After the general elections of 1970, as the political situation in the country deteriorated, he, along with members of the Students’ Action Committee, began organizing preparatory activities.

After the beginning of the Liberation War on 25th March 1971, Mahbub-e-Khoda formed a team of volunteers with the members of the Students Action Committee and ensured food, shelter and security for the people driven out by the Pakistani occupation force. On 11 April 1971 he joined the camp of the Mukti Bahini at Brahmanbaria along with his 72 volunteers. In the first few months of the Liberation War, he participated in forefront war against the Pakistan Army as a platoon commander under Sector No. 3. On 19 November 1971 at the Hejamara Camp, he led Eid al-Fitr prayers. He led the Eid al-Adha congregation at the then Race Course Maidan (now Suhrawardy Udyan) in Dhaka following the victory of Bangladesh in the war.

== Darbar Sharif ==
Dewanbag Sharif
- দেওয়ানবাগ দরবার শরীফ
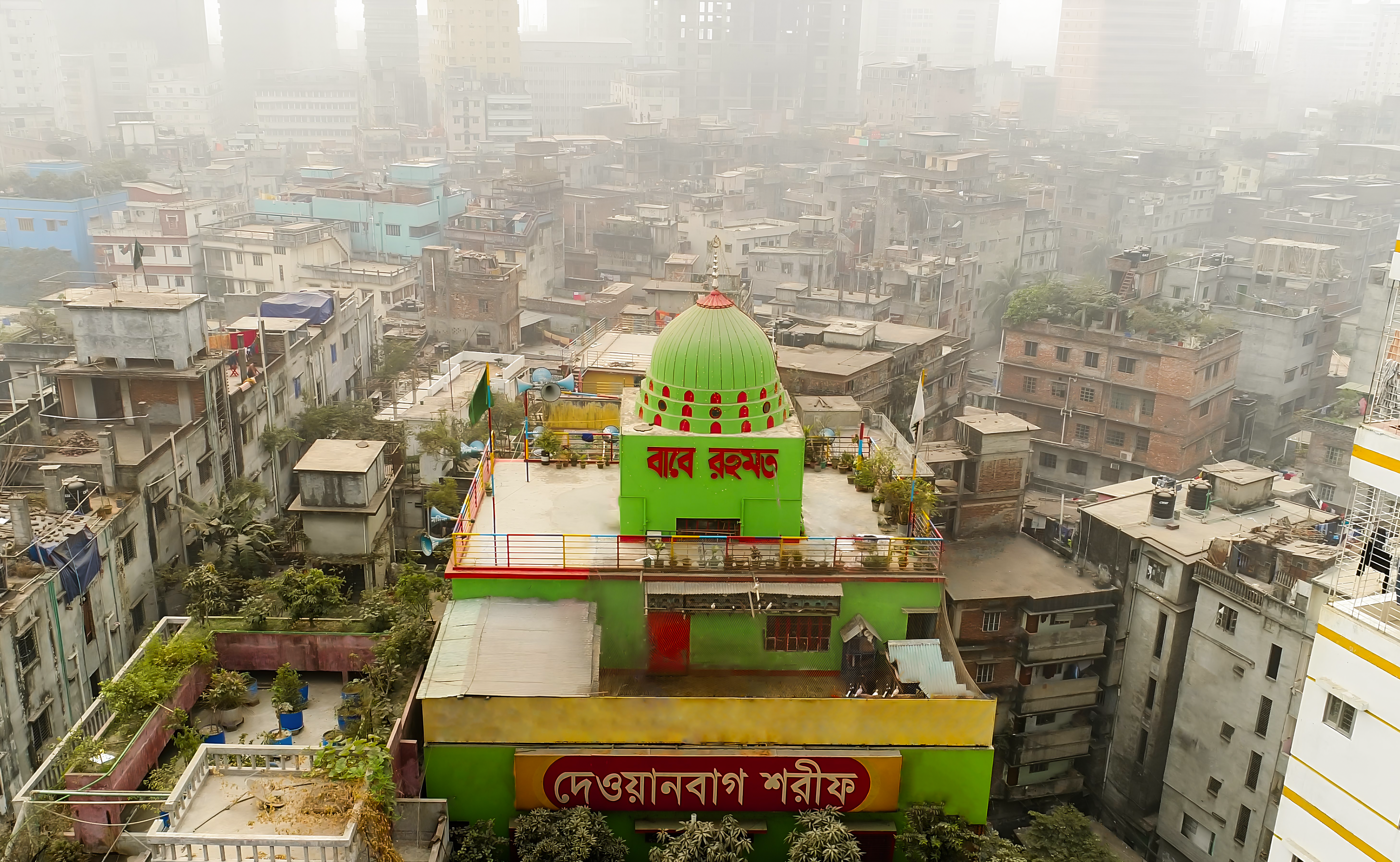

Religion
- Affiliation: Islam
- Branch/tradition: Sufism
- District: Dhaka
- Province: Motijheel
- Region: Dhaka City
- Festivals: World Ashek-e-Rasul (PUBH) Conference; Eid-e-Miladunnabi (SAW); Laylat al-Qadr; Laylat al-Barat; Eid al-Fitr; Eid al-Adha
- Ecclesiastical or organisational status: Darbar Sharif and Mosque
- Leadership: Arsafm Qudrat E Khoda
- Status: Active

Location
- Location: 147, Arambagh, Motijheel, Dhaka-1000
- Municipality: Dhaka City Coorporation
- Country: Bangladesh
- Interactive map of Dewanbag Sharif
- Territory: Arambagh

Architecture
- Style: Islamic architecture
- Founder: Syed Mahbub E Khoda
- Established: 25 September 1985

Specifications
- Direction of façade: East
- Length: 9 Storied
- Height (max): 145 feet (44 m)
- Dome: 1

Website
- dewanbagsharif.org

Dewanbag Sharif is a tasawwuf-based Islamic institution located in Dhaka and founded by Dewanbagi. It promotes and teaches the principles of Muhammadi Islam (Islam of Muhammad). It was All the activities of Dewanbag Darbar Sharif are conducted from here.

=== Establishment ===
Mahbub-e-khoda moved to Dhaka, Bangladesh on 28 March 1985, with the aim of spreading the ideals of his self established school of Islam called "Muhammadi Islam". With a view to spreading this ideas he established the Dewanbag Sharif. On 25 September 1985, he established a religious institution called Babe Jannat Dewanbag Sharif in a small town in Madanpur, Narayanganj named Dewanbag and from there he was commonly known as Dewanbagi.

=== Other centres ===
He established a total of 10 branches to propagate and spread his teachings. First, he established the temporary head office of his theological school at Arambagh area in the capital city Dhaka in 1985. In the same year, he established the school at 'Babe Jannat' at Dewanbag in Narayanganj. Later, he established 'Babe Madina' at Kamalapur in Motijheel, Dhaka, in 1987. This is located behind the Bangladesh Bank building in south Kamalapur, Dhaka, which has a camel farm, and currently Dewanbagi and his wife Syeda Hamida Begum are engraved here.

In 1992, he permanently shifted the temporary head office from 154 Arambagh by establishing 'Babe Rahmat' at 147 Arambagh. It is serving as the main administrative center of Dewanbag Sharif.

He established 'Babe Najat' in Rangpur at 1995, 'Babe Barkat' in Trishal, Mymensing at 1998, 'Babe Niamat' in Chuadanga at 2006, 'Babe Morshed' at Ashuganj, Brahmanbaria at 2008, 'Babe Ferdous' in Moghbazar, Dhaka at 2009, and lastly 'Babe Magfirat' in Chottogram in 2010. In addition, he established hundreds of Khanqay Mahbubiya and Zaker Majlis in more than a hundred countries of the world and in various districts of Bangladesh. He also founded the World Ashek-e-Rasul Organization with the aim of spreading his belief to the outside world. Mahbub-e-Khoda founded the Sufi Foundation Bangladesh in 1992 and the Al Quran Research Center in 1998.

=== Principal teachings ===
Dewanbag Darbar Sharif has 4 principles teachings known as the main teachings of Muhammadi Islam.

- Tazkiyat al-Nafs — Self-purification

This teaching focuses on cleansing the inner self from negative traits and purifying one’s character to attain spiritual refinement.

- Zikar-e-Qalbi — Heart awakening

It emphasizes constant inner remembrance of God, keeping the heart spiritually awakened beyond outward forms of dhikr.

- Salah with Hujuri — Concentration in prayer

This teaches performing prayer with full presence, humility, and mindfulness, turning salah into a deeply spiritual experience rather than a mere ritual.

- Ashek-e-Rasul — Being the beloved of Muhammad

This principle highlights developing sincere love and devotion for the Islamic prophet Muhammad and embodying his character and teachings in one’s life.

=== Events ===
World Ashek-e-Rasul (PUBH) Conference is held almost every year on the birthday of Syed Mahbub-e-Khoda on 14 December on a predetermined date. This is the largest and most populous event of Dewanbag Sharif, which was formerly known as the World Sufi Conference.

From 1985 to 1988, a total of 4 Great Holy Ors Mubarak took place. From 1989 to 1997, the name was changed to World Sufi Conference. There were a total of 9 World Sufi Conferences, out of which 4 conferences were held from 1989 to 1992 at Babe Jannat Dewanbag Sharif in Narayanganj and 5 conferences from 1993 to 1997 were held at Arambagh in Motijheel, Dhaka. From 18 December 1997 until now it was again renamed as World Ashek-e-Rasul (PUBH) Conference.

From 1989 to 2019, both the World Sufi Conferences and World Ashek-e-Rasul (PUBH) Conferences were held at Arambagh in Motijheel, Dhaka.

Also important days for the Muslim Ummah like Eid-e-Milad an-Nabi (PUBH), Laylat al-Qadr, Shab-e-Barat, Shab-e-Meraj, Holy Ashurah, Eid-al-Fitr, Eid-al-Adha, and Weekly Ashek-e-Rasul (PUBH) Mahfil are held every Friday at Dewanbag Sharif.

=== Attacks ===
In September 2024, miscreants attacked and torched the Babe Jannat Dewanbag Sharif in the Madanpur area of Narayanganj's Bandar upazila.

=== Prominent figures ===
As Mahbub-e-khoda revived the Muhammadi Islam as the main ideology and propagated across the people, after his demise he appointed his second eldest son Arsafm Qudrat E khoda as his spiritual successor.

- Mahbub-e-Khoda Dewanbagi (1949 - 2020)
- Arsafm Qudrat E Khoda (b. 1985)

=== Gallery ===
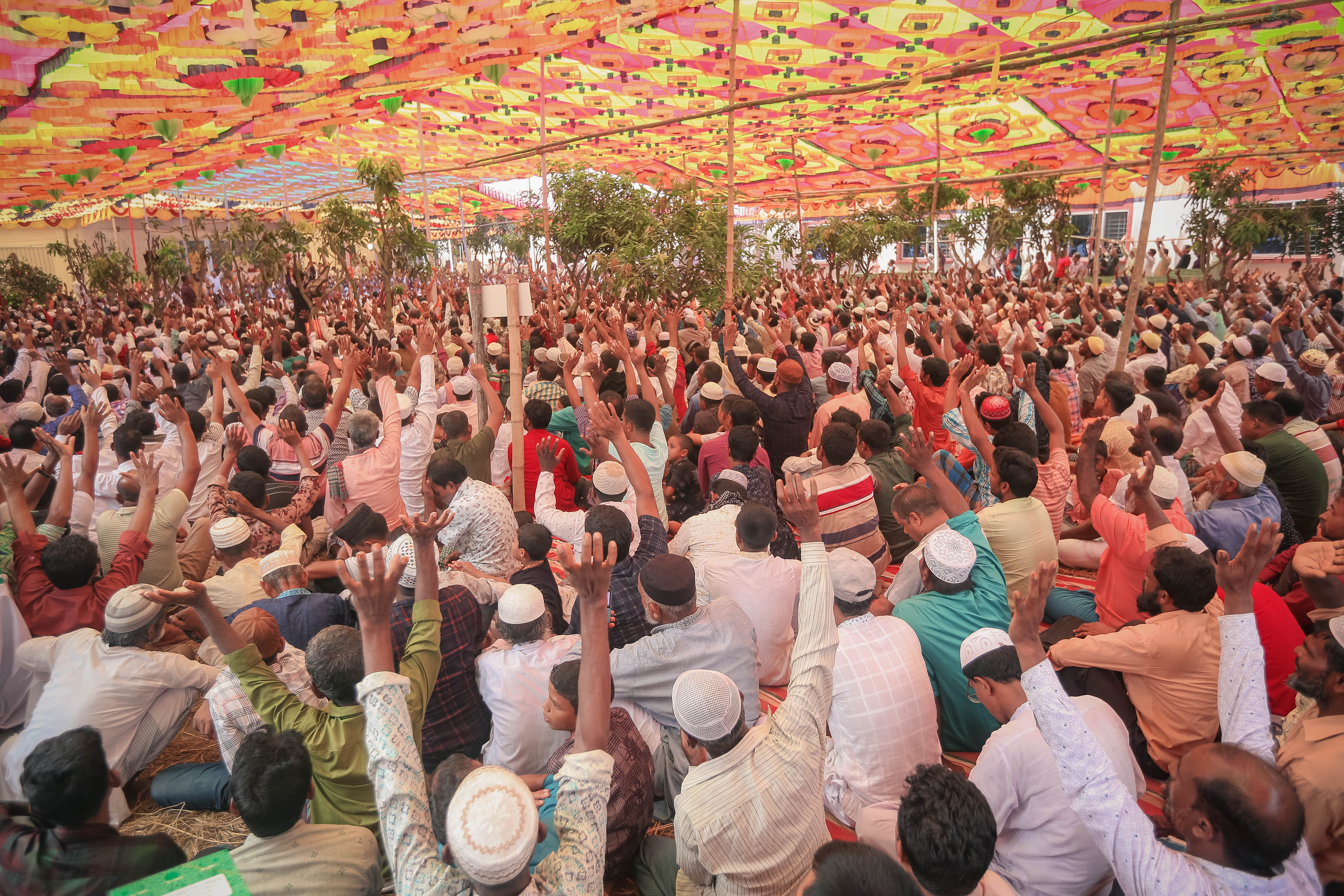
Babe Najat Dewanbag Sharif, Rangpur

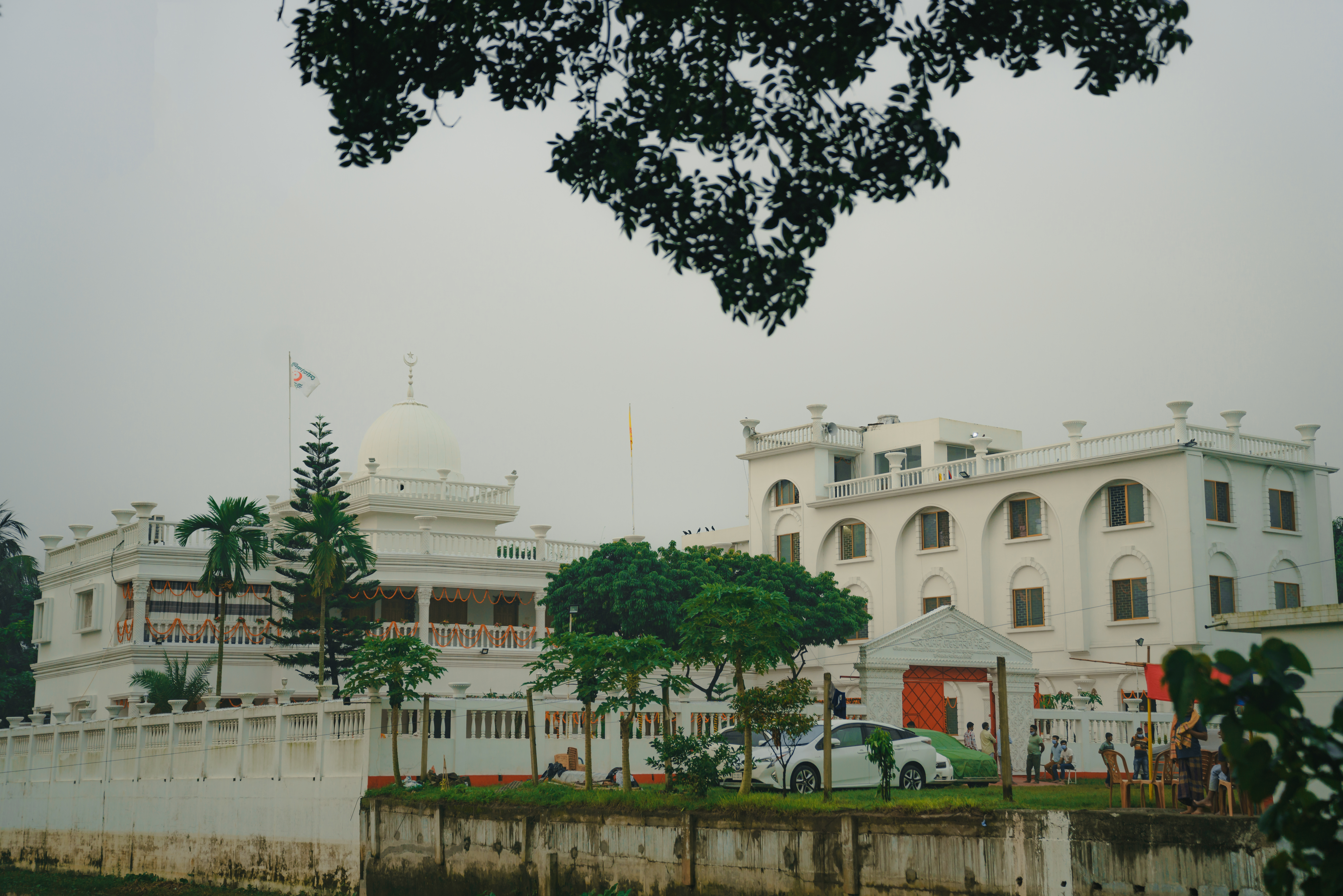
Babe Morshed Dewanbag Sharif, Brahmanbaria

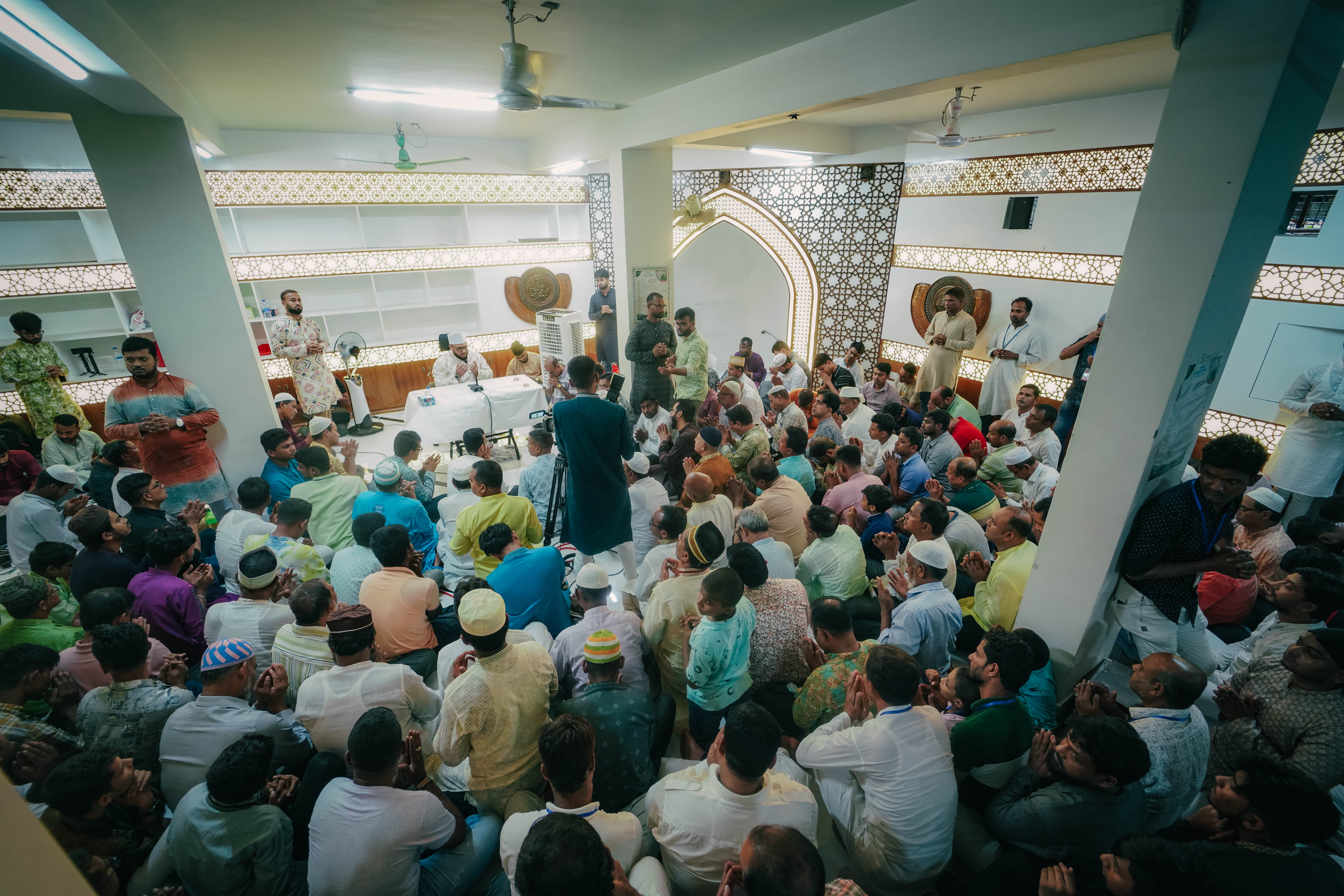
Ground Floor of Dewanbag Sharif

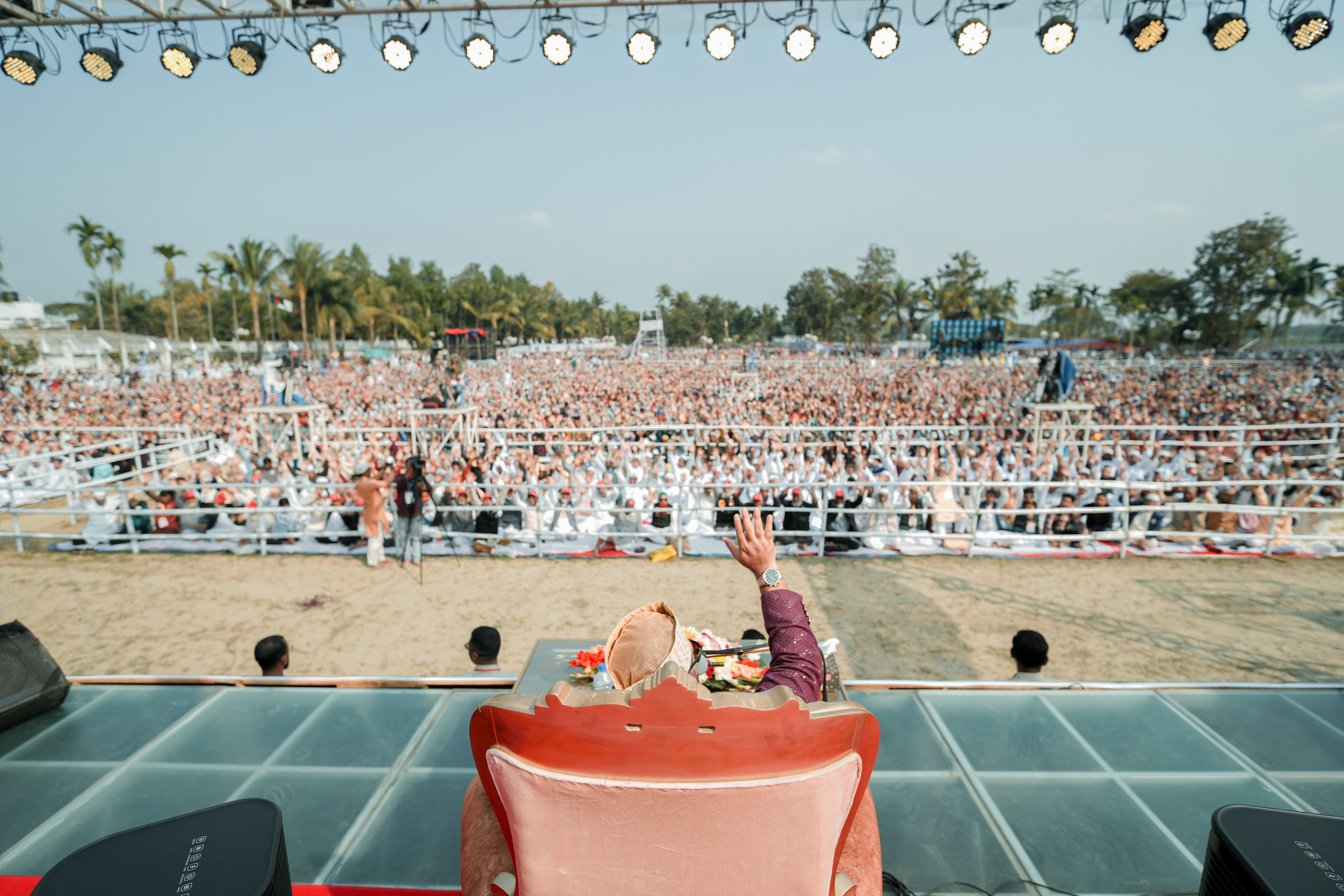
World Ashek-e-Rasul (PUBH) Conference, 2024

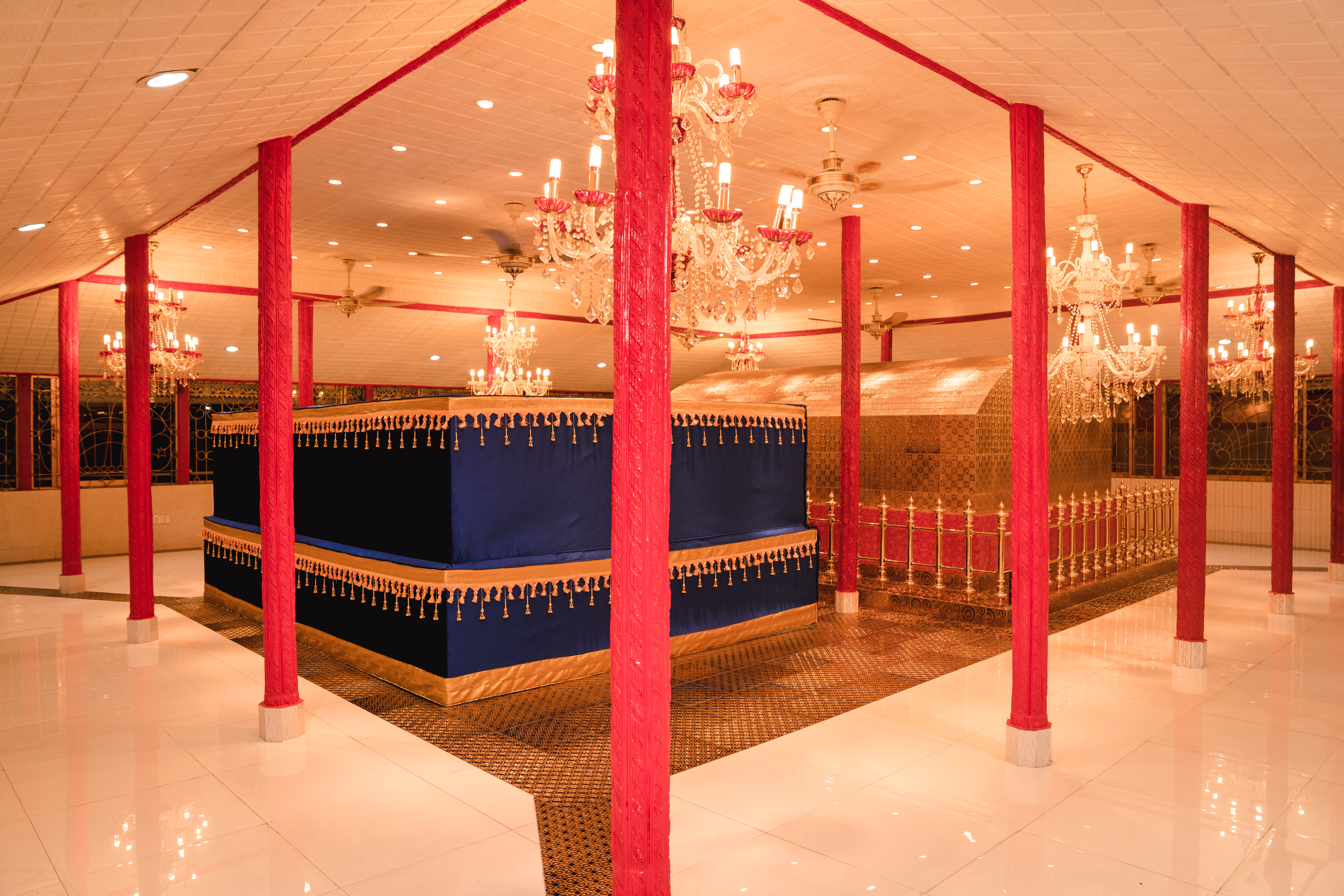
Resting Place of Dewanbagi Hujur and His Wife

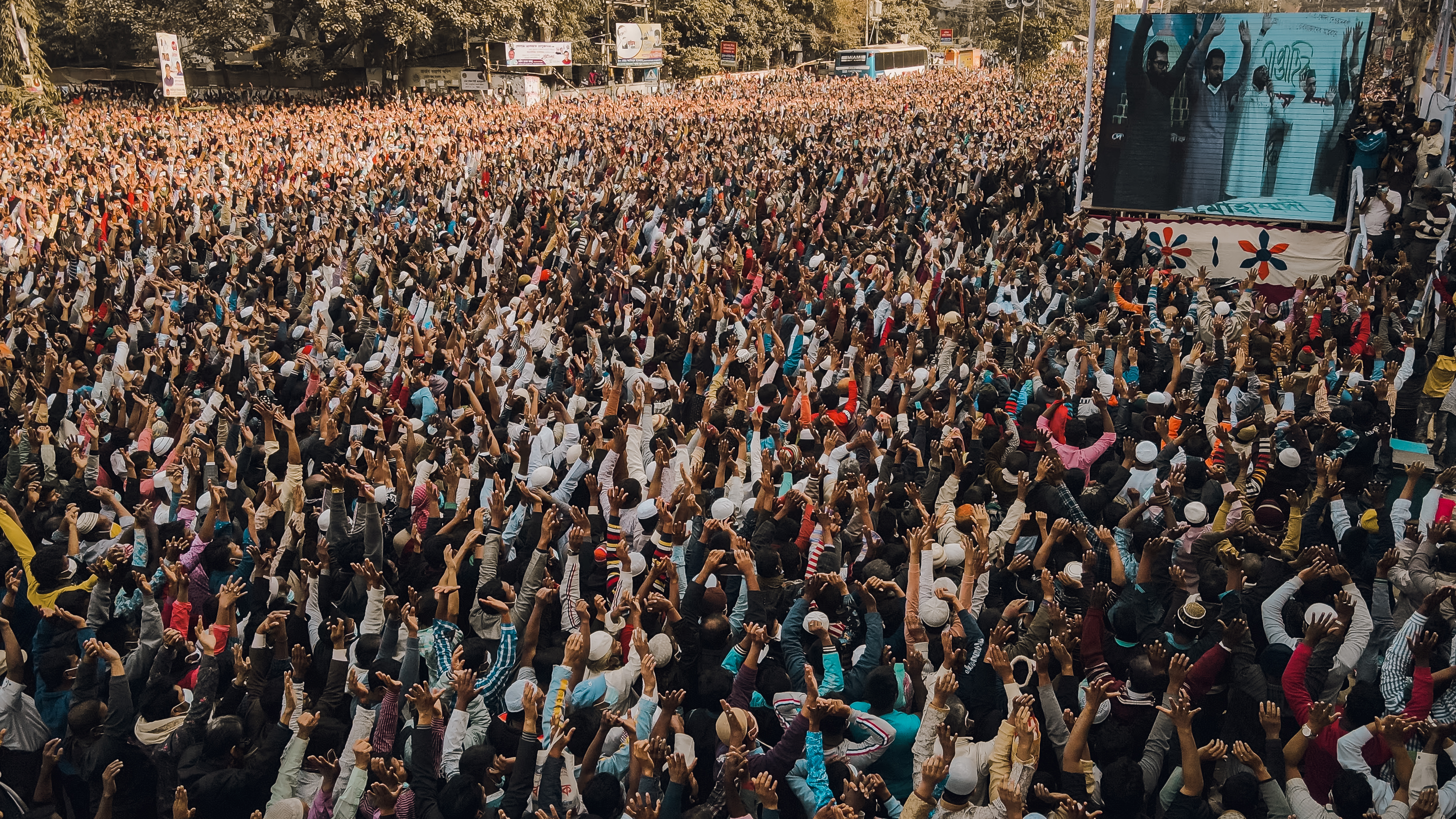
Crowd in Dewanbag Sharif, Dhaka

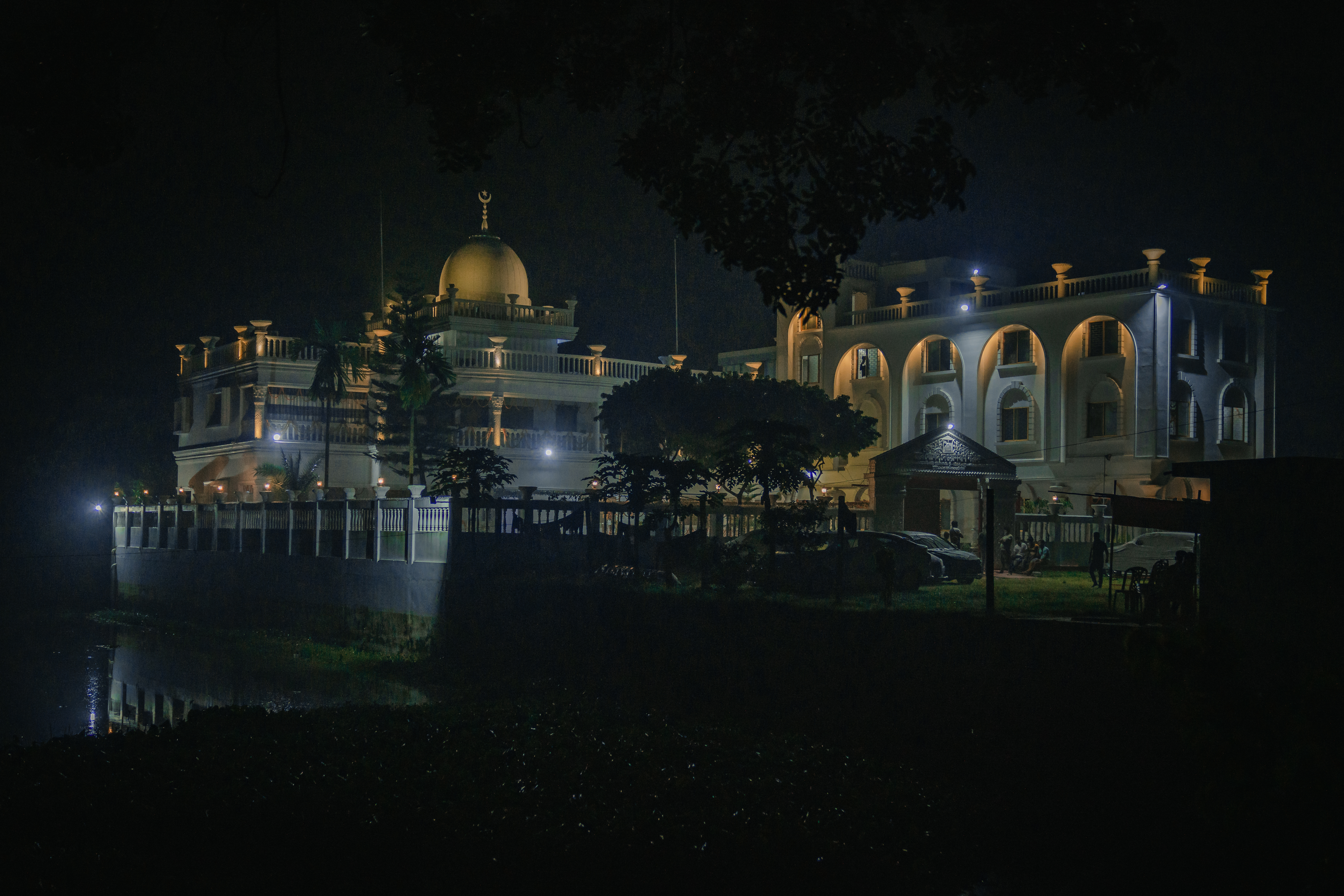
Babe Morshed Night View

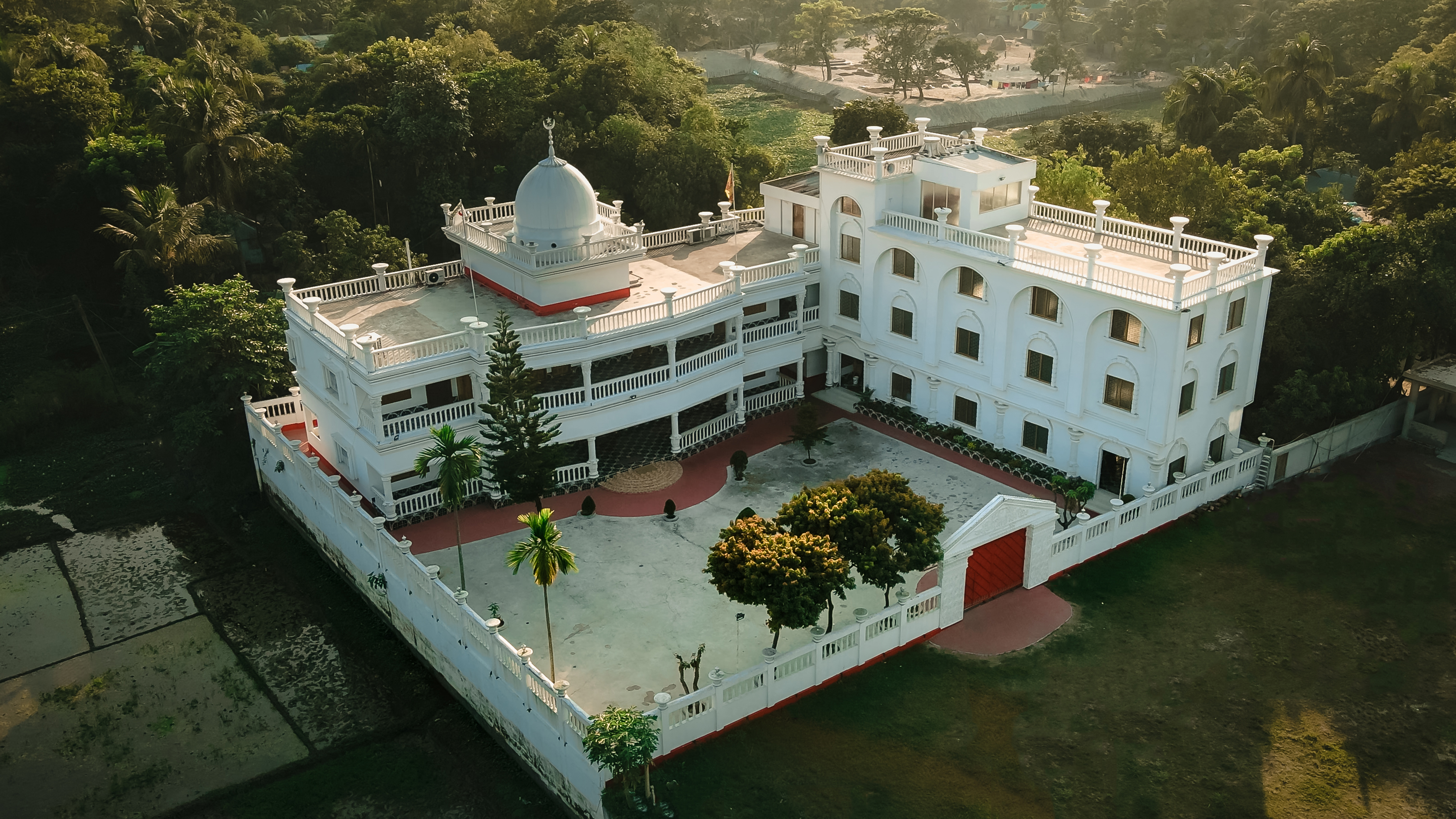
Babe Morshed Dewanbag Sharif Top View

== Controversial statements ==
Dewanbag Sharif has faced criticism and controversy at different times, often arising from misunderstandings and differing interpretations of its Sufi-oriented practices. Some groups have questioned its spiritual approach; however, supporters maintain that its teachings remain firmly grounded in the core principles of Islam, emphasizing spiritual purification, moral reform, and service to humanity through its religious and social activities.

In 2016, Bangladesh Islamic Foundation held a review meeting to examine controversial statements on Islam and Sharia made by Dewanbagi. The issue gained attention after some of the Dewanbagi’s statements spread on YouTube and social media, prompting wider discussion among Islamic scholars. Most of the scholars called for action, including repentance and apology, while some also questioned whether his statements were consistent with Islam at all. Supporters argued that they failed to provide any proof.

== Books and publications ==
Mahbub E Khoda has authored books on Sufism in Bengali. Notable works include:

=== Books ===
- Tafsir-E-Sufi Samrat Dewanbagi(8 volumes)
- Eid Moon Sighting Problem and Solution
- Sufi Samrat Uncovers Actual Identity of Allah: Is Allah Not Really Seen?
- Sufi Samrat Uncovers hidden Truth On Great Prophet: Was Muhammad (Sm) Really Poor?
- Mohammadi Islam in the Conspiracy of Yazid
- Revolutionary Religious Reformation of Sufi Emperor (2 volumes)
- The Revolutionary Contribution of Sufi Emperor: Which is the way of Allah?
- The Easy way to Get Closer to Allah
- Which is the way of Peace?
- Which is the way of Freedom?
- Muhammadi Islamer Wazifa

=== Periodicals ===
- Sufi Samrat Sharanika
- Monthly Atmar Bani
- The Weekly Dewanbag
- Weekly The Message

== Death and burial ==
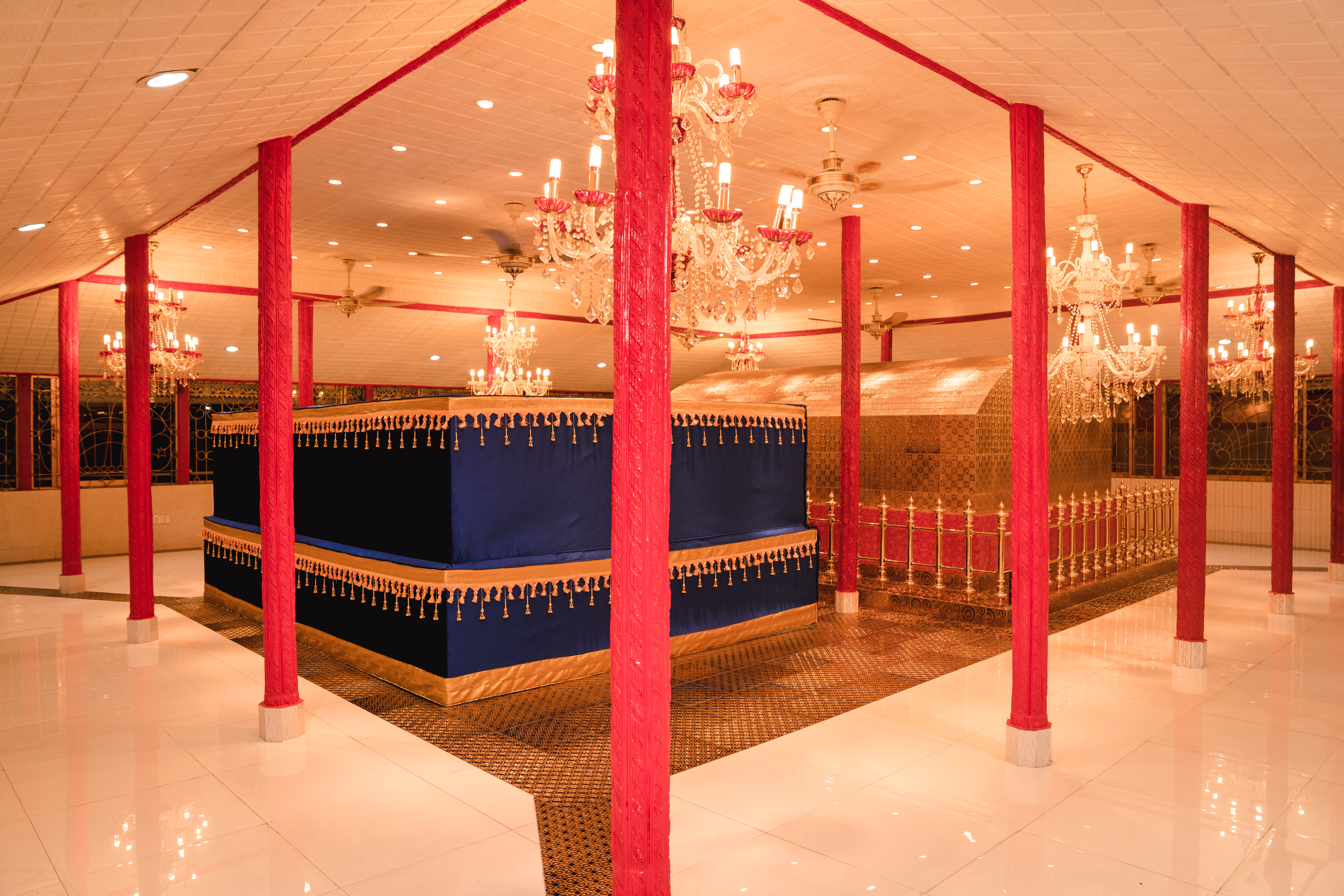
The‌ mausoleum of Mahbub E Khoda & his wife.

Mahbub-e-Khoda passed away on 28 December 2020 at United Hospital, Dhaka after a stroke, where he was taken and declared dead by the doctors. His Salat al-Janazah was held on the next day, Tuesday, 29 December, after Dhuhr, at Babe Rahmat Dewanbag Sharif. Hundreds of thousands of devotees attended his Salat al-Janazah. After the funeral prayer, he was given a Guard of honour as a freedom fighter. He was then buried at Babe Madina, Kamalapur, Dhaka beside his wife.

Before his death, Mahbub-e-Khoda declared his second eldest son, Arsafm Qudrat E Khoda, as the successor.
