= Fateh Ali Waisi =

Sufi and poet from British Bengal

- فتح علی ویسی

Personal life
- Born: c. 1820 Chittagong District, Bengal Presidency, Company Raj
- Died: c. 1886 Calcutta, Bengal Presidency, British India
- Main interest: Sufism
- Notable work: Diwan-i-Waisi
- Education: Hughli Madrasa; Aliah Madrasha

Religious life
- Religion: Sunni Islam
- Denomination: Sufi
- Philosophy: Sufism
- Jurisprudence: Hanafi
- Tariqa: Naqshbandi-Mujaddidi

Senior posting
- Predecessor: Noor Muhammad Nizampuri
- Successor: Syed Wazed Ali Mehedibagi

Military service
- Arabic name
- Personal (Ism): Fāteh ʿAlī فاتح علي
- Patronymic (Nasab): ibn ʿWāres Alī ابن وارث علي

Sayyid Fateh Ali Waisi (1820-1886) was a Sufi saint, preacher of Islam and a Persian-language poet. His epic poem Diwan-i-Waisi, written in Persian, gained widespread popularity. Due to its literary importance, the poem is included in the curricula of various universities, including Dhaka University.

== Birth and identity ==
Fateh Ali was born in 1820 in Mallik Sobhan Hajipara, Chittagong District, Bengal Presidency, Company Raj (located in present-day Amirabad Union, Lohagara Upazila, Chittagong District, Bangladesh). His father's name was Wares Ali, also a Sufi saint, who died in the Battle of Balakot against the British.

== Spirituality ==
As a child, Waisi went to the forests of the hilly region of Chittagong with his elder brother for spiritual enlightenment. He took oath of allegiance to Noor Muhammad Nizampuri, from whom he received the caliphate (successorship) of the Qadiriyya, Naqshbandi, Chishti and Mujaddidi orders.

== Diwan-i-Waisi ==
Waisi wrote his epic poem Diwan-i-Waisi in Persian. The book is written in spiritually charged ghazals and rhythms, expressing his love for the Islamic prophet Muhammad.

== Death ==
Waisi later moved permanently to Bengal Presidency's Murshidabad. He died in British Indian capital Calcutta in 1886 at the age of 66.
