= Noor Muhammad Nizampuri =

19th century Bengali sufi (1790–1858)

- نور محمد نظامپوری

Personal life
- Born: c. 1790 Noakhali District, Bengal State, British East India Company
- Died: November 1, 1858 AD Mithanala, Mirsharai, Chattogram District
- Era: 19th century
- Known for: Jihad against Sikhs
- Occupation: Teacher

Religious life
- Religion: Islam
- Denomination: Sunni
- Jurisprudence: Hanafi
- Tariqa: Naqsbandi-Mujaddidi

Muslim leader
- Predecessor: Syed Ahmad Barelvi
- Successor: Syed Fateh Ali Waisi

Noor Muhammad Nizampuri was a 19th-century Sufi saint. His ancestors were residents of Ghazni. He was one of the three Ghazis of Syed Ahmad Barelvi.

== Lineage ==
Nizampuri's ancestor Bakhtiyar Qutuz Alam came to Delhi with his family. Some say that they migrated to Noakhali from Ghazni. Nizampuri's father's name was Mohammad Fanah. He was a resident of Noakhali. This is where Nizampuri was born.

== Early life and education ==
The exact year of birth of Nur Muhammad Nizampuri is not known. It is believed that he was born in 1790. After completing his primary education, he joined the Calcutta Alia Madrasa for higher education. From this madrasa, he received higher education in Tafsir and Hadith. After completing his higher education, he joined here as a teacher.

== Death ==
He died on 1 November 1858. His shrine is located in the village of Molihaish in Mithanala Union, three miles west of Sufia Road on the Dhaka-Chittagong Highway.
