= Zikar-e-Qalbi =

Zikar-e-Qalbi which is also known as Zikar-e-khafi or silent zikr, is being practiced by Naqshbandi Sufi followers. This way of zikar, Dhikr ذکر, focuses on remembering Allah in one's heart. One has to feel that his heart is saying Allah, Allah, Allah, all the time day or night, standing or sitting, talking or while doing any work.
