= Shah Waliullah Dehlawi =

Indian Muslim scholar (1703–1762)

Shaykh al-Islām, Imam of Hind, Mujaddid Shah Waliullah Dehlawi
- قطب الدين أحمد ولي الله بن عبد الرحيم العمري الدهلوي

Personal life
- Born: 21 February 1703 Phulat, Muzaffarnagar, Mughal Empire
- Died: 20 August 1762 (aged 59) Delhi, Mughal Empire
- Resting place: Mehdiyan
- Children: Shah Abdul Aziz
- Parents: Shah Abdur Rahim (father); Fakhrun Nisa (mother)
- Main interest(s): Hadith, Tafsir, history, bibliography, fiqh
- Notable works: Hujjat Allah al-Baligha; Al-Fawz al-Kabir
- Occupation: Mufassir, Muhaddtih, historiographer, bibliographer, theologian, philosopher, academic, linguist

Religious life
- Religion: Islam
- Denomination: Sunni
- Order: Naqshbandi
- Jurisprudence: Hanafi/Shafi'i
- Creed: Ash'ari

Muslim leader
- Students: Murtada al-Zabidi, Majduddin
- Influenced by: Abu Hanifa, Al-Shafi'i, Ahmad ibn Hanbal, Baha' al-Din Naqshband
- Influenced: Shah Abdul Aziz Dehlavi
- Arabic name
- Personal (Ism): Aḥmad أحمد
- Epithet (Laqab): Quṭb ad-Dīn قطب الدين; Shāh Walīullāh شاه ولي الله
- Toponymic (Nisba): al-ʿUmarī العمري ad-Dihlawī الدهلوي

Qutb al-Din Ahmad ibn ʿAbd al-Rahim al-ʿUmari al-Dehlawi (Arabic: قطب الدين أحمد بن عبد الرحيم العمري الدهلوي, romanized: Quṭb ad-Dīn Aḥmad ibn ʿAbd-ur-Raḥīm al-ʿUmarī ad-Dehlawī; 21 February 1703 – 20 August 1762), commonly known as Shah Waliullah Dehlawi (also Shah Wali Ullah), was an Islamic Sunni scholar and Sufi reformer who contributed to the Islamic revival in the Indian subcontinent and is seen by his followers as a renewer.

== Early life and education ==
Ahmad was born on 21 February 1703 to Shah Abdur Rahim, an Islamic scholar in Delhi. He became known as Shah Waliullah because of his status as an Islamic scholar; he memorized the Qur'an by age seven. He quickly mastered Arabic and Persian letters. Ahmad was married at age fourteen; by age fifteen, he had completed the standard curriculum of Hanafi law: theology, geometry, arithmetic, and logic. Two years later, he succeeded his father as dean of his Madrasah-i Rahimiyah. Shah Waliullah visited Makkah at age 29 years in 1732. Shah Waliullah's great-grandson was Shah Ismail Dehlvi, who had an impact on the Deobandi movement.

== Views ==
=== Sunni Islam ===
Shah Waliullah defined Sunni Islam broadly, rather than confining it to a specific school of theology. According to Shah, Ahlus Sunnah Wal Jamaah are those who followed the Qur'an and Sunnah on the way of the Sahaba (companions of Muhammad) and tabi'īn, by holding "fast to the beliefs of the pious ancestors (al-salaf)". He considered the four legal schools and the Ahl al-Hadith (Athari) and Ahl al-Ra'y (Maturidi and Ash'ari) schools of theology to be Sunni. According to Shah, the differences between them are only over secondary issues of valid Ikhtilaf; on fundamental issues, they are united.

=== Fiqh (jurisprudence) ===
He believed that leaders should rule in accordance with the precepts of Islam, and the teachings of Islam should be purified by teachers who exercise ijtihad based on the Quran and Hadith. Shah Waliullah believed that boundaries must be placed on Sufism, and the four main madhahib should be combined into a single system of law and moral codes. He said,

There are numerous benefits in it that are no secret to anyone. These are especially required in these days when people lack courage, when carnal passions have taken deep root in people's souls and whenever a person is obsessed only with his opinion.

In Tahfimat al-Ilahiyya, Shah expressed his conviction that the unity of the Hanafi and Shafi'i schools of law was essential for an Indian Islamic revival; many of his legal positions aligned with the views of Imam al-Shafi'i. He saw the reconciliation of differences between the Shafi'i and Hanafi schools of fiqh as his duty. Particularly concerned about the Hanafi fanaticism prevalent in his community, Shah called for an association of all the schools of law. He said,

The entire Ummah, or rather those of them who are dependable, are unanimous about the fact that it is permissible to follow one of these four Madhahib that have been methodically systematised and recorded. This unanimity remains to this day.

=== Tafsir (Quranic commentary) ===
Shah Waliullah emphasised a direct understanding of the Quran; students with sufficient knowledge must work with the text rather than previous commentaries. He said that the Quran is as clear to any student with sufficient knowledge of Arabic as it was understandable to its first recipients and scholars, including those portions which are mutashābih (unclear). Shah preferred the interpretation closest to the literal meaning (ẓāhir al-maʿnā) of the Quran and the Sunnah which fits the Qur'anic context, without adhering to a particular school in exegesis, grammar, or theology.

=== Divine attributes ===
Shah Waliullah held the Ash'ari position on the nature of divine attributes, believing that a limited ta'wil (alternative interpretation) of the divine attributes is permissible. He wrote in Hujjatullah al-Balighah, "It is our right to interpret them (the attributes of God) in senses more easy to comprehend and more suitable than what they said, for clarity's sake, since holding these (specific) meanings is not stipulated, and the one investigating by means of intellectual proof is not forced to use them, and they are not preferable to others, nor do they have any exclusive merit."

Although he was an Ash'ari, Shah Waliullah opposed excesses in kalam (speculative theology) and defended early Atharism. He wrote in Hujjatullah al-Balighah, "Those speculative theologians (Mutakallimun) who behaved contemptuously towards the Atharis calling them corporealists and anthropomorphists, saying that they sought refuge in the formula of "without asking how" (Bila Kayf) ... this contempt of theirs is unfounded and they err in their sayings both from the viewpoint of tradition and of reason and they err in slandering the leaders of the true religion." In contrast to speculative theologians he considered in error, he said about the limits of interpretation and its speculative nature: "There is no ruling to the effect that God meant what we hold, nor is there a consensus that one should believe in them and acknowledge them; such a thing would be absurd."

=== Marathas ===
Shah Waliullah expressed his dislike of the Marathas in a dream in Fuyooz-ul Haramain: "And I saw that the king of the infidels took over the land of the Muslims and looted their property. He enslaved their women and children, and in the city of Ajmer he declared the rites of disbelief".

==== Correspondence with Ahmad Shah Durrani ====
He reportedly wrote to Durrani Empire founder Ahmad Shah Durrani (also known as Ahmad Shah Abdali) urging Abdali to intervene militarily against the expanding influence of the Maratha Empire, which had gained control of former Mughal territories after the decline of the Mughal Empire. Shah Waliullah viewed the Maratha ascendancy as a threat to Muslim authority in the Indian subcontinent, and believed that Abdali’s intervention would help restore a balance of power. Abdali invaded India a number of times, culminating in the 1761 Third Battle of Panipat in which the Maratha forces were decisively defeated. The "Maratha resurrection" followed ten years later, led by Mahadaji Shinde.

Historians differ in their assessment of Shah Waliullah’s motivation and the extent of his influence on Abdali’s decision to invade. Some view his appeal as primarily political, aimed at countering Maratha expansion, and others interpret it in the broader context of regional 18th-century power struggles.

=== Shia Islam ===
In one of Shah Waliullah's letters in the manuscript collection in Rampur, Uttar Pradesh, he asked Muslim rulers led by Ahmad Shah Bahadur to ban religious ceremonies by non-Muslims and issue orders against some ceremonies by the Shia (whom he considered Muslim): "Strict orders should be issued in all Islamic towns forbidding religious ceremonies publicly practiced by non-Muslims ─ such as the performance of Holi and ritual bathing in the Ganges. On the tenth of Muharram, Shi'a should not be allowed to go beyond the bounds of moderation: they should neither say or do things that are considered offensive by other Muslims ─ that is, to recite tabarra, or to curse the first three successors of the Islamic prophet Muhammad, in the streets or bazaars".

=== Arab culture ===
Shah Waliullah strongly opposed adopting non-Islamic customs, and advocated commitment to Arab Islamic culture: "Muslims, no matter where they live, wherever they spend their youthful days, they should in any case be completely separated from the natives of that country in their culture, traditions and mannerisms. And wherever they are, they must be immersed in their Arabic splendor and Arabic trends". About adherence to Arab culture, he said: "Beware! The rich intend to adopt the ways of strangers and non-Arabs and those who deviate from the right path, and try to mix and be like them". Shah Waliullah sought to conform to the habits and customs of the early Arabs and Muhammad, and to "abstain from the customs of the Ajam and the Indians." The only logical hikmat-i-amali, or practical wisdom for Muslim rulers, was to strengthen community boundaries by conducting jihad against opponents and promoting cultural practises (adab) which distinguished Muslims from non-Muslims.

== Death ==
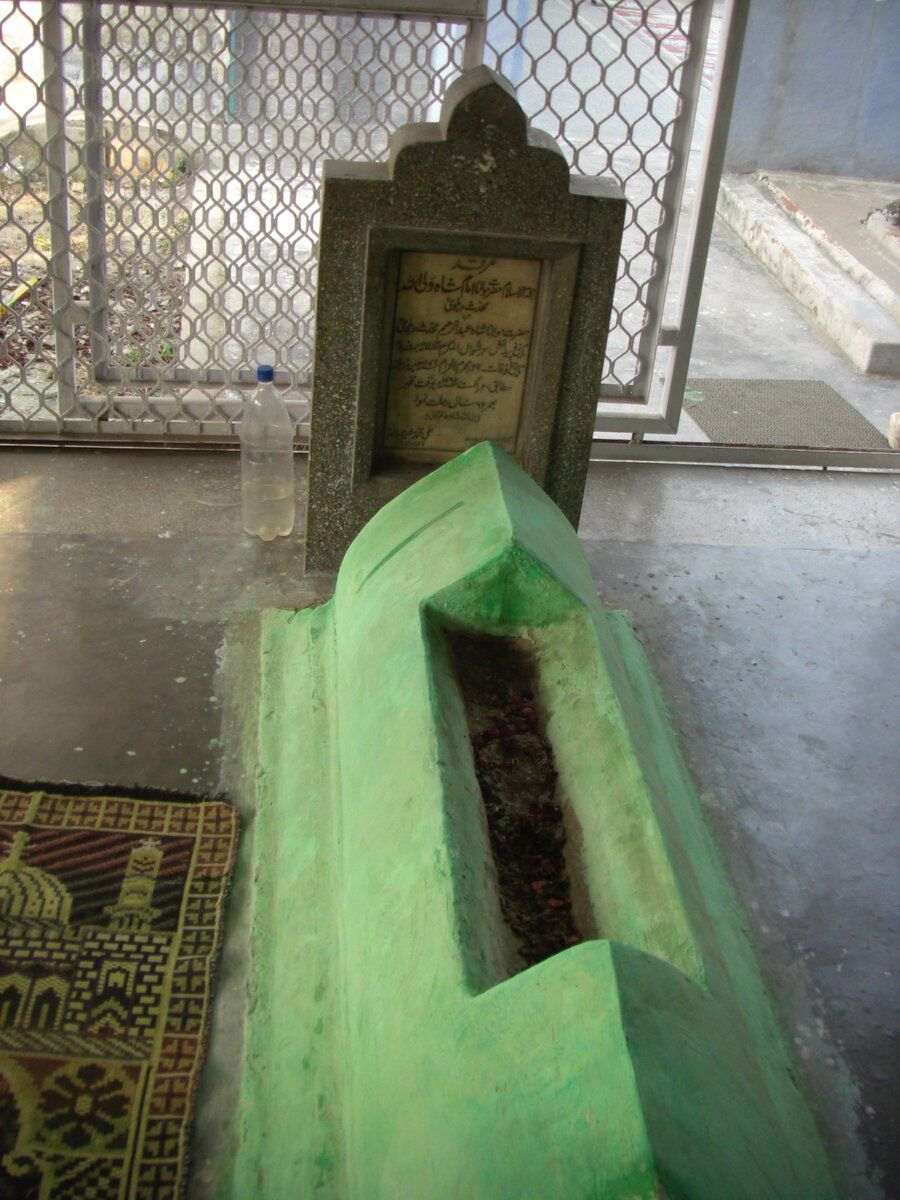
Grave of Shah Waliullah Dehlawi in Mehdiyan, Delhi, India

Shah Waliullah died at age 59 on 20 August 1762 (29 Muharram 1176 AH), at the time of Jummah prayer in Old Delhi. He was buried beside his father Shah Abdur Rahim in Mehdiyan, a graveyard on the left of the Delhi Gate.

== Works ==
- Hujjat Allah al-Baligha (The Conclusive Argument of God), Lahore: Shaikh Ghulam Ali and Sons, 1979. Considered to be his most important work. First published in Bareilly, India in 1286 Hijri. T
- Al-Fawz al-Kabir
- (The Sacred knowledge), ed. D. Pendlebury, trans. G. Jalbani, The Sacred Knowledge, London: Octagon, 1982.
- Al-Khayr al-kathir (The Abundant Good), trans. G. Jalbani, Lahore: Ashraf, 1974.
- Sata'at (Manifestations), trans. into Urdu by S.M. Hashimi, Lahore: Idarah Thaqafat Islamiyya, 1989; trans. into English by G. Jalbani, Sufism and the Islamic Tradition: the Lamahat and Sata'at of Shah Waliullah, London.
- Lamahat (Flashes of Lightning), Hyderabad: Shah Wali Allah Academy, 1963; trans. G. Jalbani, Sufism and the Islamic Tradition: the Lamahat and Sata'at of Shah Waliullah, London, 1980 (an important work on Sufism).
- Futuh al-Haramayn (Emanations, or Spiritual Visions of Mecca and Medina).
- Al-Tafhimat (Instructions, or Clear Understanding), Dabhail, 1936 (two volumes).
- Al-Budur al-bazighah (The Full Moon Rising in Splendour).
- Ta'wil al-ahadith fi rumuz qisas al-anbiya (Symbolic Interpretation of the Events in the Mysteries of Prophetic Tales)
- Al-Musawwa - An Arabic commentary on Al-Muwatta by Malik ibn Anas
  - Musaffa - A Persian commentary on the same text

Shah Waliullah is also credited as the first person on the Indian subcontinent to translate the Quran into Persian. He wrote 51 books in Persian and Arabic; among the best-known are Hujjat Allah al-Baligha and Izalat al-Khafa.
