= Shah Abdul Aziz Dehlavi =

Indian Islamic scholar (1746–1824)

- شاہ عبد العزیز دھلوی
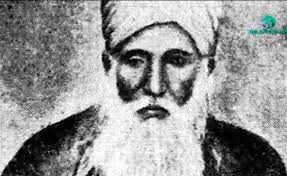

Personal life
- Born: 11 October 1746 Shahjahanabad, Mughal Empire
- Died: 24 June 1824 (aged 77) Shahjahanabad, Mughal Empire
- Resting place: Mehdiyan
- Children: Amtul Aziz (daughter)
- Parents: Shah Waliullah (father); Bibi Iradat (mother)
- Main interest(s): Anti-Shi'ism, Fiqh, Tafsir
- Notable idea: Tauhfa Ithna Ashari
- Relatives: Shah Muhammad Ishaq (grandson) , Sayid Thanaullah Hamed Sunipati (maternal-grandfather)

Religious life
- Religion: Islam
- Denomination: Sunni
- Jurisprudence: Hanafi
- Tariqa: Naqshbandi
- Creed: Maturidi

Muslim leader
- Influenced by: Shah Waliullah Dehlawi Ahmad Sirhindi
- Influenced: Ubaidullah Sindhi Karamat Ali Jaunpuri Fazl-e-Haq Khairabadi Imam Ahmad Raza Khan Barelvi movement

Shah Abdul Aziz Muhaddith Dehlavi (11 October 1746 – 5 June 1824) was an Indian Sunni Muslim Scholar and Sufi Saint. He is known as the Muhaddith and Mujaddid from India. He was a member of the Naqshbandi Sufi order. Their tradition inspired later Sunni scholarship, including Abdul Aziz's father Shah Waliullah Dehlawi. Aziz's dream was to declare India a Darul Harb.

== Early life and education ==
Shah Abdul Aziz was born on 25 Ramadan, 1159 AH same as 11 October 1746 AD in Delhi in the reign of Mughal Emperor Muhammad Shah. Aziz was the eldest son of Shah Waliullah Dehlawi.

Aziz was only 17 years old when Waliullah died. He took over as the teacher of Hadith in place of his father. He belonged to Hanafi school of thought. He was a Muhaddith, Mufassir and Mujtahid.

== Fatwas ==
=== Against British government ===
He declared the British Raj of India to be Dar al-Harb and pronounced that it was obligatory upon Muslims to wage war for freedom, liberty, justice and Inquilab against the British government. In his Fatwa he wrote that ousting the British should be the main objective; after that, it was legitimate for Muslims to hold the reins of power. On its basis, Aziz has been some times viewed as a precursor of the Indian freedom movement.

=== Fatwa against Tafazzul Husain Khan ===
Aziz declared that the Shia scholar Tafazzul Husain Kashmiri was an apostate (mulhid-i-kamil) because of some of his views.

== Major contributions ==
=== On Shiism ===
Shah Abd al-Aziz sharply criticized the Shi'as. Although he did not declare them apostates or non-Muslims, but he considered them heretics and their practices similar to Hindus or other non-Muslims. In a letter he advises Sunnis to not greet Shias first, and if a Shia greets them first. In his view, Sunnis should not marry Shias, avoid eating their food and the animals slaughtered by a Shia. In 1770 AD, Rohilla ruler Najib-ud Daula died and Afghan control over power in Delhi weakened. Mughal Emperor Shah Alam returned to Delhi and adopted secular policy and appointed a Shia general, Najaf Khan. Najaf Khan died in 1782, but his influence had helped Shias resettle in Delhi. This was not acceptable for Shah Abd al-Aziz and he termed it as a Shia conspiracy. To create fear among the majority and incite them, he wrote in Tuhfa Asna Ashariya:

"In the region where we live, the Isna Ashariyya faith has become so popular that one or two members of every family is a Shia". In "Malfuzat-i Shah Abd al-Aziz (ملفوظات شاہ عبد العزیز)", he says that no Shia was left in Delhi after Ahmad Shah Abdali's expulsion, as predicted by his father Shah Waliullah. How could a community that was completely cleansed thirty years ago reach such high numbers in such a short period? The reality lies somewhat in between: expelled Shias had started to return and resettle in their homes, and continue Muharram processions which had upset him.

He compiled most of the books against shias available to him, albeit in his own language and after adding his own ideas, in a single book "Tuhfa Asna Ashariya (تحفہ اثنا عشریہ )". Shah Abd al-Aziz published his book in 1789 AD, using a pen name "Hafiz Ghulam Haleem". This book appeared at a very important juncture in history of the Subcontinent. In the nineteenth century, publishing technology was introduced to India and publications became cheaper. This book was published at a large scale, financed by Sunni elite. An Arabic translation of it was sent to the middle east. The first Shia response came from Mirza Muhammad Kamil Dihlavi, titled "Nuzha-tu Asna Ashariya (نزھۃ اثنا عشریۃ)". However the book which gained widespread popularity in the scholarly circles was "Abqaat-ul Anwar fi Imamat-i Aaima til Athaar (عبقات الانوار فی امامۃ الائمۃ الاطہار)" by Ayatullah Mir Hamid Husain Musavi containing 18 volumes.

=== Observance of Muharram ===
Aziz authored a short treatise entitled "Sirr al-Shahadatayn (سر الشہادتین)", in which he described the commemoration of Muharram as God's will to keep the memory of Imam Hussain's martyrdom alive. He also said that the martyrdom of Imam Hasan and Imam Hussain was, in spirit, the martyrdom of Muhammad. He used to arrange public gatherings in Muharram himself, he had criticized performance of Taziya and other arts associated with commemoration of Muharram.

Rizvi describes:

"In a letter dated 1822 CE he wrote about two assemblies which he used to hold in his own house and considered perfectly legal from the Shari’a point of view. One was held on the anniversary of Prophet Muhammad’s demise and the other to commemorate the martyrdom of Imam Hasan and Imam Hussain on the tenth of Muharram or a day or two earlier. From four to five hundred and up to a thousand people gathered there. They recited durud. After the Shah’s own arrival, the greatness of Imam Hasan and Imam Hussain, as related in the works of hadith, was described. The prophecies concerning their martyrdom, the circumstances that led to it and the wickedness of those who killed them were also recounted. The elegies on their martyrdom which Umm Salma and the companions of the Prophet had heard, were also described. Those dreadful visions, which Ibn Abbas and the Prophet’s other companions saw relating to Prophet’s anguish at his grandson’s tragic death, were also recited. The session concluded with the intoning of the Quran and fatiha over whatever food was available. Those who could recite a salam or an elegy melodiously did so. Those present, including Shah Abd al-Aziz, wept". But it was also in the 19th century that exclusionary puritanical and revivalist movements started to emerge among Muslims. Muharram was limited to Shias only.

== Death and legacy ==
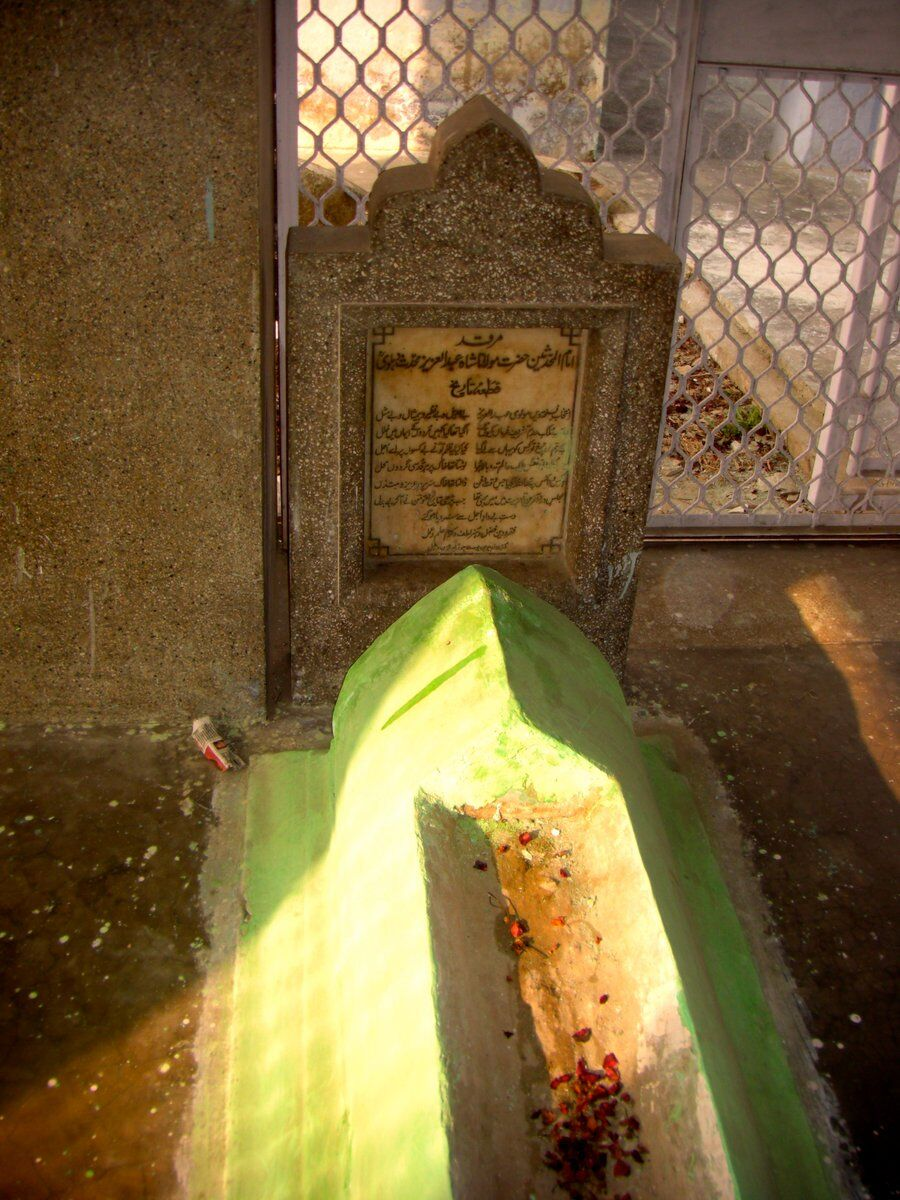
Grave of Shah Abdul Aziz Dehlavi

=== Death ===
Shah Abdul Aziz died on the morning of 7th Shawwal, 1239 Hijri/ 5 June 1824 in Delhi in the reign of Mughal Emperor Akbar Shah II. He was buried in Mehdiyan cemetery.

=== Legacy ===
Shah Abdul Aziz translated the Qur'an into Urdu, 50 years after the Persian translation by Shah Wali 'Allah, when the Urdu language had started to replace the Persian. He completed the exegesis of his father from Surat Al-Maida to the thirteenth verse of al-Hujurat. He wrote and dictated several books, even if some differ on the number (from fifty to nearly two hundred). He composed several legal opinions, mainly condemning folk religions, especially the veneration of saints in the Shi'ah. In an attempt of integration into the system of the British colonial power he suggested English language learning to the sunni Muslim community, with the long-term objective of entering the public service of the British Empire in India.

=== Books written ===
==== Fatawa Aziz ====
Fatawa Aziz, another famous book, is the collection of Fatawa (questions and answers on religious issue).

==== Taufa Ithna Ashari ====
Taufa Ithna Ashari (Urdu: تحفہ اثناء عشریۃ, lit. "Gift to the Twelvers"), a refutation of Imami Shi‘ism A Sunni site, NazariaPak, states:

In this book, he has described the history, belief and teachings of the Shia’s. There was hardly any Suni house, he says, in which some of its members had not become Shia. They did not know anything about their new faith, or even concerning Sunnism. Therefore, the author, as he says, compiled the book, to provide information to people who were really interested in such debates.

After the book published, many Shia' scholars wrote answers to the book. One of the Shia scholars (Mohaghegh Tabatabaee محقق طباطبایی) has counted these answers up to 25 in his article "موقف الشیعه من هجمات الخصوم".

==== Sirush Shahadhatayn ====
Sirush Shahadhatayn

==== Tafseer Fat'hu-l-'Azeez ====
Tafseer Fat'hu-l-'Azeez (also known as Tafsir-i-Aziz) (in Persian)

==== BustaanU-l-Muhadditheen ====
BustaanU-l-Muhadditheen

== See also ==
- List of Islamic scholars
