= North-West Frontier Theatre of WWI =

1914–17 operations in British India

- Part of World War I
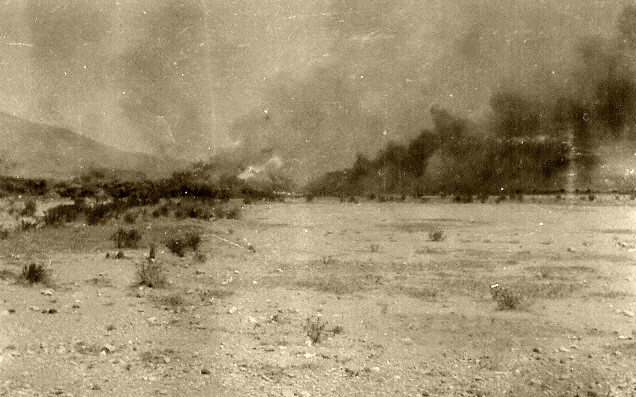
- A Mashud village burning
Date	November 1914 – July 1917
Location	North-West Frontier Province
Result	Anglo–Indian victory

Belligerents
British Empire; (India) British Raj; Supported by: (Kingdom of Nepal) Nepal (Note: Nepal aided the British in operations against the Mahsuds.)	Khost tribesmen; Bunerwals tribes; Swatis tribes; Mohmand Tribe; Mahsud tribesmen; Supported by: Germany; Ottoman Empire; Provisional Indian Government

Commanders and leaders
Vere Fane; Frederick Campbell; William Benyon	Unknown

Units involved
Bannu Brigade; Local militia	Khost tribesmen Bunerwals tribes Swatis tribes Mohmand Tribe; Mahsud tribesmen

Strength
Few thousand soldiers	7,000 tribesmen

The North-West Frontier Theatre of WWI refers to a series of military operations in the North-West Frontier Province of British India during World War I, fought from November 1914 to July 1917 against a number of nearby tribal groups. The tribes, including the Mahsuds, Mohmands, Swatis, Bunerwals, and Khost tribesmen were encouraged by the Central Powers to attack British India. Afghanistan remained officially neutral throughout.

== Background ==
In support of the British war effort, the Indian Army deployed expeditionary forces to the Western Front, East Africa, Gallipoli, Mesopotamia, Sinai and Palestine. India was thus vulnerable to hostile attention from Afghanistan. A Turco-German mission arrived in Kabul in October 1915 with obvious strategic purpose. However, Amir Habibulla abided by his treaty obligations and maintained Afghanistan's neutrality, in the face of internal opposition from factions keen to side with the Ottoman Sultan. Hostilities on the frontier remained local.

Many operations occurred in the North-West Frontier Province through the late 1800s and all the way up to Indian Independence in 1947. Some of these occurred during WWI being carried out by tribes loyal to the Ottomans. These forces fought on and off from the time of the Ottoman entry into the war all the way until the summer of 1917.

== Operations ==
=== Operations in the Tochi ===
There were two raids conducted by Kochi tribesman, They were later both suppressed by a single British brigade In March 1915.

=== Operations against the Mohmands, Bunerwals and Swatis in 1915 ===
Were a group of raids led by pro-ottoman tribesman, they was later suppressed in September 1915.

=== Mohmand blockade ===
Was a blockade done on Mohmand tribesman following their declaration of Jihad. It was lifted following their suppression in 1917.

=== Operations against the Mahsuds (1917) ===
A series of engagements in early 1917. A peace agreement was reached on 10 August 1917 with a Mahsud jirga.

== Central Powers involvement ==
The Provisional Government of India and Germany smuggled weapons through Afghanistan. The Ottomans also supported the rebellion by declaring jihad.

== Aftermath ==
Following the ending of the North-West Frontier Campaign many more similar instances of rebellion continued until Indian independence.

== See also ==
- 1914 Ottoman jihad proclamation
- List of uprisings against Entente powers during World War I
- Provisional Government of India
- Hindu–German Conspiracy
