= Military history of the North-West Frontier =

Historical aspect of modern-day Khyber Pakhtunkhwa, Pakistan

Map of the present-day Khyber Pakhtunkhwa province (green), previously the North-West Frontier; and FATA (purple)

The North-West Frontier (present-day Khyber Pakhtunkhwa) was a region of the British Indian Empire. It remains the western frontier of present-day Pakistan, extending from the Pamir Knot in the north to the Koh-i-Malik Siah in the west, and separating the modern Pakistani frontier regions of North-West Frontier Province (renamed as Khyber Pakhtunkhwa), Federally Administered Tribal Areas and Balochistan from neighbouring Afghanistan in the west. The borderline between is officially known as the Durand Line and divides Pashtun inhabitants of these provinces from Pashtuns in eastern Afghanistan.

The two main gateways on the North West Frontier are the Khyber and Bolan Passes. Since ancient times, the Indian subcontinent has been repeatedly invaded through these northwestern routes. With the expansion of the Russian Empire into Central Asia in the twentieth century, stability of the Frontier and control of Afghanistan became cornerstones of defensive strategy for British India.

Much of the Frontier was occupied by Ranjit Singh in the early 19th century, and then taken over by the East India Company when it annexed the Punjab in 1849.

Between 1849 and 1947 the military history of the frontier was a succession of punitive expeditions against offending Pashtun (or Pathan) tribes, punctuated by three wars against Afghanistan. Many British officers who went on to distinguished command in the First and Second World Wars learnt their soldiering on the North-West Frontier, which they called the Grim.

== Contestants ==
=== Afghanistan ===
In 1747 when Ahmad Khān Abdālī seized control of Kandahar, Kabul, and Peshawar, and, as Ahmad Shah Durrani, was proclaimed Shah of the Afghans. He went on to conquer Herat and Khorassan, and established an empire from the Oxus to the Indus. On his death in 1773, the Afghan domain included Baluchistan, Sindh, the Punjab, and Kashmir. Ahmad Shah was succeeded by his son Timur Shah Durrani, whose rule of twenty years saw the Afghan tide begin to ebb. Timur left many sons but no heir, and the resultant internecine struggles for the throne lasted more than thirty years. During this period the Punjab was effectively ceded to its erstwhile governor Ranjit Singh, Iran recovered Khorassan, and Sindh broke away. In 1813 Sikh forces from the Punjab crossed the Indus and seized the old Mughal fort at Attock. In 1819 Kashmir was lost, and west of the Indus Derajat also. Four years later the winter capital at Peshawar came under attack.

In 1826 Dost Mohammad Khan emerged as undisputed ruler in Kabul, and was there proclaimed Emir. He defeated a further attempt to oust him by his exiled rival Shuja Shah Durrani in 1833; however the Sikhs seized all of Peshawar the following year. In 1837 Dost Mohammad launched a counter-attack through the Khyber, but the Afghan force was halted at Jamrud Fort. Dost Mohammad had sought assistance from the East India Company against the resurgent Punjab, but was rebuffed. So Dost Mohammad turned to Imperial Russia for help.

=== Sikh Empire ===
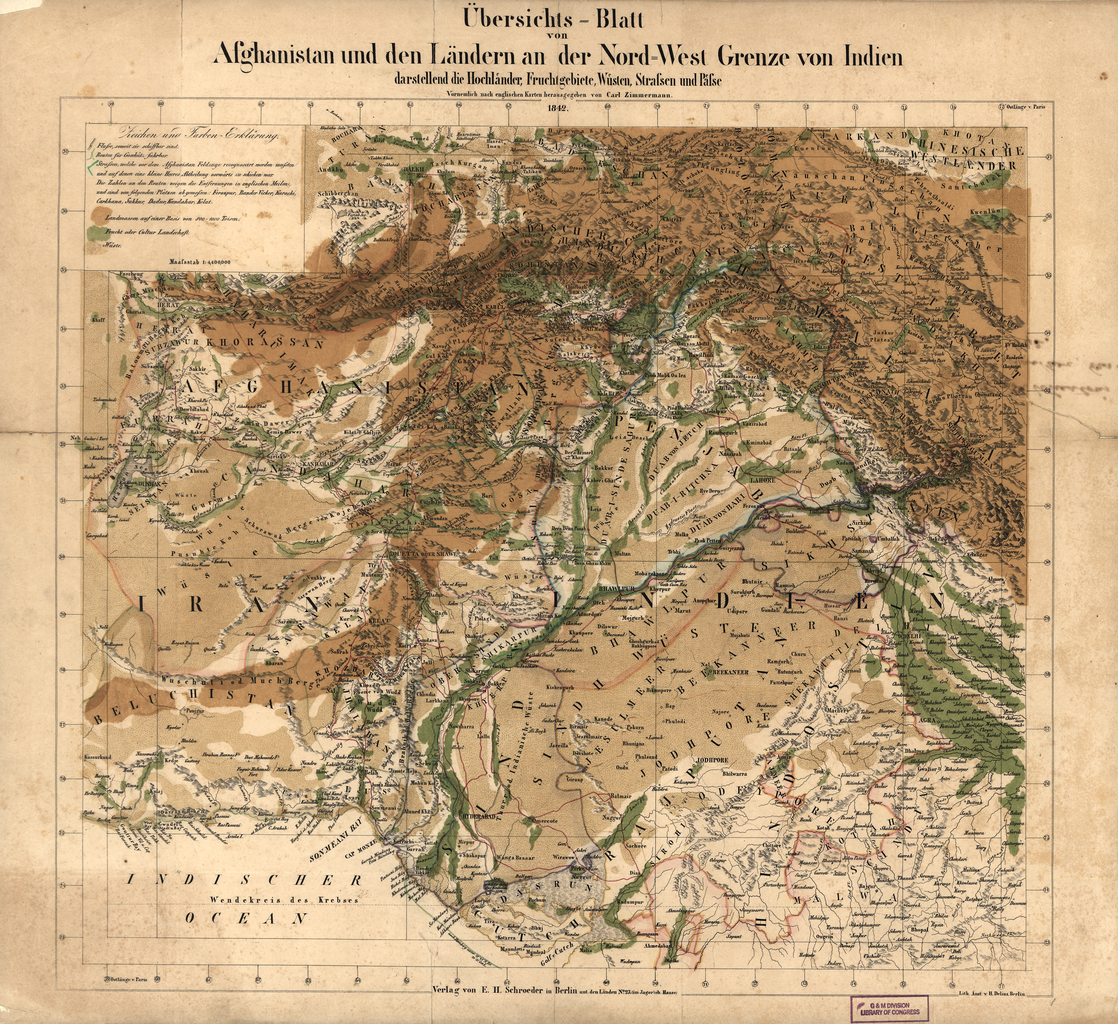
Overview of Afghanistan and the Countries on the Northwest Border of India 1842

Maharaja Ranjit Singh was a Sikh ruler of the sovereign country of Punjab and the Sikh Empire. His Samadhi is located in Lahore, Pakistan.

He then spent the following years fighting the Afghans, driving them out of western Punjab, taking opportunity of the Afghans being embroiled in civil war. The deposed Afghan king Shah Shuja rallied a significant number of tribes and received British backing in the form of the Sikh army against the Barakzai king Dost Muhammad. The civil war in Afghanistan coupled with a British backed assault meant that the Sikhs could virtually walk into Peshawar. They managed to capture some Pashtun territory including Peshawar which was under direct British supervision and control.

=== British East India Company ===
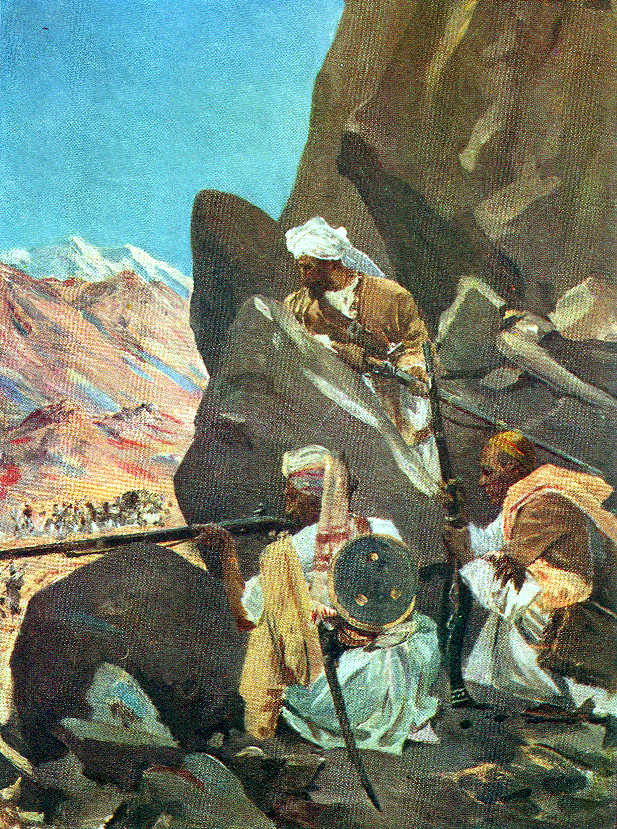
Hill Tribes men sniping a British Force

At the beginning of the nineteenth century, the East India Company controlled southern India, Bengal, Bihar, and Orissa (modern Odisha). Dominance was gained at the expense of its successive French equivalents. Britain and France were at war, and the Franco-Persian alliance of 1807, followed the same year by the Franco-Russian Treaty of Tilsit, alerted the HEIC to the external threat posed from the north-west.

By 1819 only Sindh and the Punjab remained outside the company's control. Napoleon was vanquished, but the Russian Empire had begun to expand south and east. Russian influence grew likewise, and by the early 1830s Qajar Irān was within the Tsar's sphere. Attempts by Irān to recover Herat in 1834, and again in 1837, raised the spectre of Russian armies on the road to Kandahar, whence direct access to India through the Khojak and Bolan passes.

Meanwhile, the conflict between Afghanistan and the Punjab focused on the Khyber route. Dost Mohammad appealed to the HEIC for aid in recovering Peshawar, but the company could not help him without alienating its treaty ally Ranjit Singh. When Dost Mohammad redirected his appeal to Russia, the Governor-General Lord Auckland resolved to depose Dost Mohammad, and replace him with Shuja Shah Durrani. Restored to his throne in Kabul, the exiled former ruler would accept the Sikh gains west of the Indus, and the Company controlling his foreign policy. The agreement was formalised with the Treaty of Simla signed in June 1838 between Shah Shuja, the HEIC, and Ranjit Singh.

== Chronology ==
=== 1526–1757 (Mughal Afghan Wars) ===
- Battle of Malandari Pass
- Battle of Sampagha Pass
- Battle of Ali masjid
- Battle of Nowshera (1674)
- Doaba Campaign
- Battle of Karrapa Pass (1674)
- Battle of Jagdalak (1675)
- Battle of Khapush (1675)
- Battle of Langarkot
- Battle of Dodah

=== 1800–1837 (Afghan-Sikh Wars) ===
- Battle of Hasan Abdal (1813)
- Battle of Kashmir (1814)
- Battle of Gandgarh (1820)
- Battle of Nara (1824)
- Battle of Nowshera (1823)
- Battle of Akora Khattak
- Battle of Mayar
- Battle of Jamrud (1837)

=== 1838–48 (First Afghan War to Second Sikh War) ===
- First Anglo-Afghan War (1838–1842)
- Sindh Campaign (1843)
- First Anglo-Sikh War (1845–46)
- Second Anglo-Sikh War (1848–49)

=== 1849–58 (Second Sikh War to Sepoy Revolt) ===
In the period following the annexation of the Punjab in 1849 until the Sepoy Mutiny of 1857, several expeditions were undertaken against almost every tribe along the whole of the North-West Frontier, most notably under Sir Charles Napier and Sir Colin Campbell, under orders from the governor-general, Lord Dalhousie. Disgusted at being instructed to burn Pathan villages, first Napier and then Campbell resigned and returned to England. Campbell had already decided that the best method of dealing with the tribesmen on the frontier was through bribery.

When the Sepoy Rebellion broke out Amir Dost Mohammad Khan came under internal pressure to seize the advantage and attack India. However he stood by his treaty obligations. This allowed Indian troops on the frontier to deploy to Delhi and deal with the revolt centered there.

- Operations against the Swati and Uthmankhel in Baizai (1849)
- Insurrections By Khattaks Against The British 1850-52
- Operations in the Kohat Pass (1850)
- Mohmand Expeditions (1851–2)
- Ranizai Expedition (1852)
- First Black Mountain Expedition (1852)
- Expedition against the Sayyids of Khagan(1852)
- Shirani Expedition (1853)
- Afridi Expedition (1853)
- Expedition against the Hindustani Fanatics (1854)
- Aka Khel Expedition (1855)
- Operations against the Orakzais (1855)
- Miranzai Valley Expeditions (1855–6)
- Bozdar Expedition (1857)
- Expedition against the Hindustani Fanatics (1857–8). (Note: Also known as the Sittana Expeditions)
- Sepoy Rebellion (1857–8) (Indian Mutiny)

=== 1859–1878 (Sepoy Revolt to Second Afghan War) ===
- Kabul Khel Expedition (1859)
- Mahsud Expedition (1860)
- Ambela Campaign war (1863)
- Operations against the Jadoon (1864)
- Operations at Shabkadar (1863–4)
- Second Black Mountain Expedition (1868)
- Bazotee Expedition (1868)
- Operations in the Tochi Valley (1872)
- Jowaki Expedition (1877–8)
- Operations against the Utman Khel (1878)

=== 1878–1898 (Second Afghan War to Frontier Rebellion) ===
In 1877, Amir Sher Ali received a Russian mission in Kabul, but refused to accept one from the British. The following year Sher Ali signed a treaty with Russia. The British sent a mission anyway, but the mission and its armed escort were denied passage through the Khyber Pass. The British threatened to invade, and when no apology was forthcoming, did so. Sher Ali died while fleeing to Russian territory, and his son Yakub succeeded him. On May 26, 1879, Amir Yakub signed the Treaty of Gandamak, whereby Afghanistan surrendered its foreign policy to the British Empire, which in turn promised protection from aggression. Afghanistan ceded some territory and accepted a British Resident in Kabul until 1894.

In September 1879, some six weeks after establishing his residency, Sir Louis Cavagnari and his escort were murdered. Hostilities promptly resumed. Yakub's army was defeated in September 1880, and his throne was offered to, and accepted by, Abdur Rahman, who agreed to surrender all claims on the Khyber, the Kurram, Sibi, and Pishin.

- Second Afghan War (1878–1880)
- Zakka Khel Expeditions (1878–9)
- Operations against the Mohmands (1878–80)
- Operations against the Zaimukht (1878–9)
- Operations against the Marris (1880)
- Mahsud-Waziri Expedition (1881)
- Expedition to the Takht-i-Suliman (1883)
- Third Black Mountain Expedition (1888)
- Operations in the Zhob Valley (1890–1)
- Fourth Black Mountain Expedition (1891)
- Miranzai Expeditions (1891)
- Hunza-Nagar Expedition (1891)
- Mahsud Expedition (1894–5)
- Chitral expedition (1895)
- Tochi Valley Expedition (1897)
- Siege of Malakand (1897)
- Operations of the Buner Field Force (1897–1898)
- Tirah Campaign (1897)
- First Mohmand campaign (1897–1898)

=== 1898–1914 (Frontier Revolt to Great War) ===
- Mahsud Waziri blockade (1900–1902)
- Kabul Khel Expedition (1902)
- Bazar Valley campaign (1908)
- Mohmand Expedition of 1908

=== 1914–1918 (First World War) ===
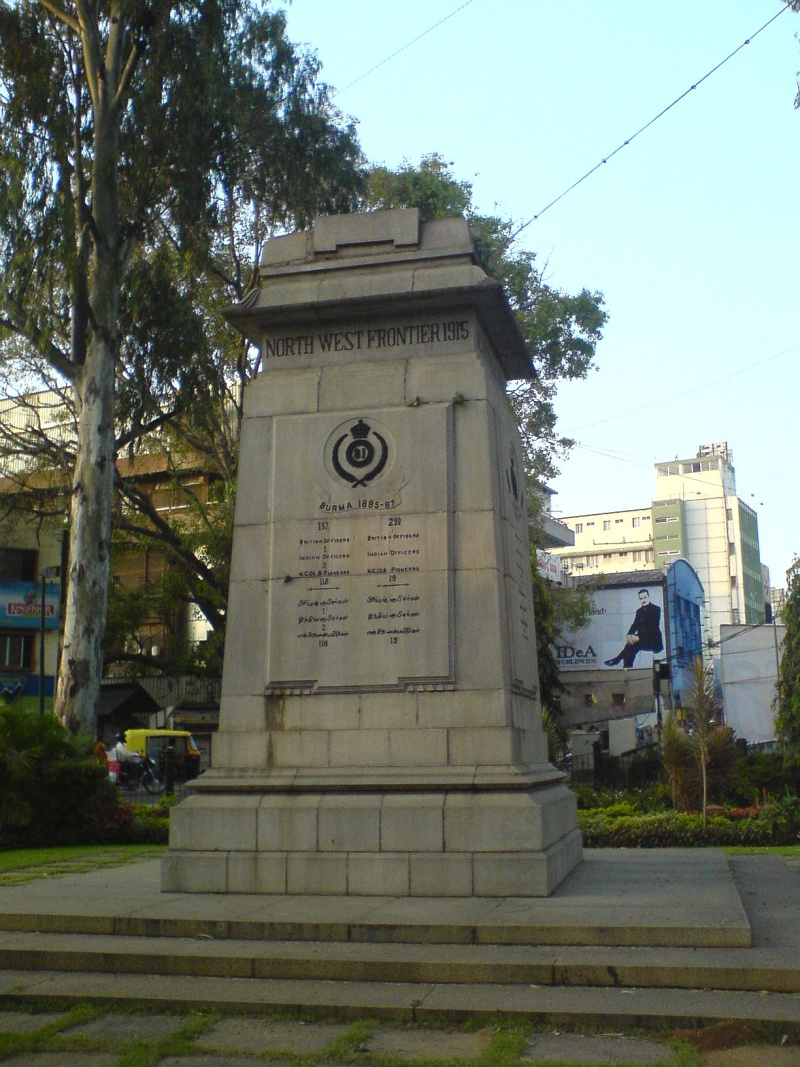
Madras Regiment War Memorial, Bangalore, mentions lives lost in the North West Frontier by the Madras Sappers

In support of the British war effort, the Indian Army deployed expeditionary forces to the Western Front, East Africa, Gallipoli, Mesopotamia, Sinai and Palestine. India was thus vulnerable to hostile attention from Afghanistan. A Turco-German mission arrived in Kabul in October 1915 with obvious strategic purpose. However, Amir Habibulla abided by his treaty obligations and maintained Afghanistan's neutrality, in the face of internal opposition from factions keen to side with the Ottoman Sultan. Hostilities on the frontier remained local.

- Operations in the Tochi (1914–15)
- Operations against the Mohmands, Bunerwals and Swatis (1915)
- Kalat Operations (1915–16)
- Mohmand Blockade (1916–17)
- Operations against the Mahsuds (1917)
- Operations against the Marri and Khetran tribes (1918)

=== 1919–39 (between the wars) ===
Having upheld Afghan neutrality while India was engaged in the Great War, Habibulla sought full independence for Afghanistan in February 1919. Such a reward might have consolidated his rule, but later that month he was murdered.

His successor Amanullah pursued a similar policy by different means. With India's Army de-mobilising, and its Government preoccupied with violent unrest in western India, Amanullah sent his troops across the Frontier in early May. At the end of the month he sought an armistice, which was granted on 3 June. By the Treaty of Rawalpindi signed in August, Afghanistan gained control of its foreign affairs, and in turn, recognised the Durand Line as its border with India.

The short-lived war had long-term consequences in Waziristan, where tribesmen rallied to Amanullah's cause. The western militia posts were abandoned. Many of the militia deserted, taking their modern weapons and joining their fellow tribesmen in attacking the remaining posts. As a result, the Indian Army's Waziristan Force was fully engaged in re-establishing the posts and restoring the lines of communication from November until May 1920. The western base at Wana was finally reoccupied in December 1920.

The long-term plan for control of the district entailed building metalled roads along the lines of communication to a new central base to be established at Razmak. In 1921 work began on the southern road up the Tank Zam from Jandola, under the protection of the Waziristan Force. The following year work on the northern road from the Tochi began at Idak, shielded by the Razmak Force advancing to its objective. The two roads met in 1924, linking North and South Waziristan, and enabling the Indian Army to reorganise both areas as one military district. The Waziristan and Razmak Field Forces then devolved into brigades based permanently at Manzai, Razmak, Gardai, and Bannu.

The following year the few tribal sections in South Waziristan remaining openly hostile were subdued by aircraft alone. For this operation the No. 2 (Indian) Wing of the RAF under Wing Commander Richard Pink was based at Tank and Miranshah. Aircraft comprising the Wana Patrol maintained regular weekly contact with the posts at Wana and Tanai until 1929, when the road from Sarwekai was completed, and the Manzai brigade relocated to Wana.

- Punjab Rebellion, including the Amritsar Massacre (1919)
- Third Anglo-Afghan War (1919)
- Operations in Waziristan (1919–20)
- Operations in Waziristan (1921–24)
- Pink's War (1925)
- Operation against the Mohmands (1927)
- Afridi Redshirt Rebellion (1930–31)
- Mohmand and Bajaur Operations (1933)
- Loe Agra Campaign (1935)
- Second Mohmand Campaign (1935)
- Operations in Waziristan (1936–39)

=== 1940–1947 (Second World War to independence) ===
From 1940 to 1947, Waziristan and indeed most of the Frontier remained relatively calm and the British were able to divert most of their military effort to more important theatres. There were, however, brief periods of trouble on the frontier, which required the British to continue to maintain a military presence in the region, although for the main they were able to employ mainly garrison or rear-area troops during this time, thus allowing them to free up front-line units for active service elsewhere.

Trained regular troops were desperately needed for the war against Germany and Japan.

Razmak, Wana and Bannu were garrisoned with half-trained units which suffered serious reverses, losing men, rifles, and light machine-guns.

In 1944, a British committee under Lieutenant-General Sir Francis Tuker was set up to review future policy for the region. As part of its findings, it recommended a return to the Curzon Plan, which advocated the withdrawal of all regular forces from tribal territory into outposts, or cantonments, along the administrative border from where they could keep an eye on things. The unadministered districts would then once again become the responsibility of the local militias.

=== Withdrawal ===
In 1947, following the independence, the North-West Frontier region became a part of the newly formed nation of Dominion of Pakistan. Based upon the recommendations of the Tucker committee in 1944 (see above), the newly formed Pakistani government decided to move away from the previous British policy of 'forward defence' in the North-West Frontier region and ordered the withdrawal of forces from Waziristan, as it was felt that the presence of a regular military force in the region was provoking tensions with the local tribesmen. This withdrawal began on December 6, 1947 and was successfully completed by the end of the month under the codename Operation Curzon.

=== Pashtunistan conflict ===
- Waziristan rebellion of 1948-1954
- 1949 Mughalgai raid
- Afridi Sarishtas rebellion
- Pakistan-Afghanistan skirmishes
- Bajaur Campaign
- 1961 Batmalai raid

=== Soviet Afghan war ===
- Badaber uprising
- Second Battle of Zhawar

=== 2004–Present ===
- Battle of Wanna
- Operation al-Mizan
- Battle of Mirali
- Waziristan Accord
- Operation Sunrise
- First Battle of Swat
- Operation Zalzala
- Battle of Bajaur
- Operation Sirat-e-Mustaqeem
- Second Battle of Swat
- Operation Rah-e-Nijat
- 2009 Khyber Pass offensive
- Operation Janbaz
- Nizam-e-Adl Regulation 2009
- Mohmand Offensive
- Operation Black Thunderstorm
- Orakzai and Kurram offensive
- Operation Koh-e-Sufaid
- Operation Rah-e-Shahadat
- Operation Khyber
- Operation Zarb-e-Azb

== Treatment of prisoners-of-war ==
According to the British officer John Masters, Pashtun women in the North-West Frontier Province (1901–1955) of British India during the Anglo-Afghan Wars would brutally castrate non-Muslim soldiers who were captured, especially British and Sikhs. Pashtun women urinated into prisoners' mouths. A method of execution by this is recorded: captured British soldiers were spread out and fastened with restraints to the ground, then a stick, or a piece of wood was used to keep their mouth open to prevent swallowing. Pashtun women then squatted and urinated directly into the mouth of the man until he drowned in the urine, taking turns one at a time. This method of execution was reported to have been practiced specifically by the women of the Afridi tribe of the Pashtuns.

== Military formations ==
=== Corps of Guides ===
Corps of cavalry and infantry, raised at Peshawar in 1846 by Lt. Harry Lumsden, and later based at Hoti Mardan. Originally one troop of cavalry and two companies of infantry, the cavalry component later expanded to 2½ squadrons, and the infantry to 4½ companies. Two further infantry battalions were raised in 1917.

From its inception the corps was clothed in native style, with smock, baggy trousers and turban of home-spun cotton, and jerkin of sheepskin. The cotton was dyed grey with a derivative of a dwarf palm known as mazari, while the leather was dyed khaki with mulberry juice. Thus was military dress first coloured khaki for its camouflage effect, and the Guides were the first troops to wear it. The drab colour is well suited to the barren rocky terrain of the North-West Frontier, and all but one of the other Punjab frontier units soon followed the Guides example.

In 1848 the Second Sikh War broke out and the corps won its first battle honours; 'MOOLTAN', 'GOOJERAT', and 'PUNJAUB'. Thereafter the Guides were engaged in most frontier affairs, and from 1857 the corps was included in the Punjab Irregular Force, and subsequently in the Punjab Frontier Force.

That same year the Corps of Guides was ordered to Delhi, covering the 930 km from Mardan in twenty-two days and famously going into action on arrival. They were duly honoured with DELHI 1857.

At the beginning of the Second Afghan War in 1878, the Guides Infantry, together with the 1st Sikh Infantry, PFF, took part in forcing the Khyber, and were prominent in seizing the fortress of Ali Masjid. For this and subsequent efforts the Corps of Guides was awarded the battle honours ALI MASJID, KABUL 1879, and AFGHANISTAN 1878–80.

The last decade of the 19th century saw the Guides employed in the Chitral campaign of 1895, and the Punjab Frontier Revolt of 1897–8. Thus was the corps awarded the battle honours 'CHITRAL', 'MALAKAND', and 'PUNJAB FRONTIER'.

The reforms of 1903 gave to the Queen's Own Corps of Guides (Lumsden's) a subsidiary title in the form of its founders name, but left it numberless. In 1911 the corps took up Frontier Force as its first subsidiary title.

During the First World War the cavalry branch of the Corps was deployed overseas to Mesopotamia, but not before winning a further honour in its own territory; 'N.W. FRONTIER INDIA 1915'.

In 1922 the separation became permanent, when the mounted branch was redesignated the 10th Queen Victoria's Own Corps of Guides Cavalry (Frontier Force), and the infantry was amalgamated as the 5th Battalion, 12th Frontier Force Regiment (Queen Victoria's Own Corps of Guides).

=== Sind Frontier Force ===
Formed in 1846 to guard the southern part of the North-West Frontier. Initially consisting of just the Scinde Irregular Horse, the force under Capt. John Jacob was part of the Bombay Army.

==== Cavalry ====
The Scinde Irregular Horse was raised at Hyderabad in 1839 by Capt. Ward.

The regiment earned its first battle honour during the Operations in Scinde 1839-42, when it was awarded the unique distinction 'CUTCHEE'. For the subsequent Scinde Campaign of 1843 it was awarded 'MEEANEE' and 'HYDERABAD'.

A second regiment was raised at Hyderabad in 1846 by Capt. J. Jacob.

During the Second Sikh War both the 1st and 2nd Irregular Horse earned further distinction with 'MOOLTAN', 'GOOJERAT', and 'PUNJAUB'.

A third regiment was raised in 1857, and in 1860 the regiments were designated simply Scinde Horse.

The 1st Scinde Horse was deployed to suppress the Sepoy Revolt of 1857–8, and was duly awarded CENTRAL INDIA.

All three regiments were rewarded for their part in the Second Afghan War:-

- 1st Scinde Horse; AFGHANISTAN 1878-79
- 2nd Scinde Horse; AFGHANISTAN 1879-80
- 3rd Scinde Horse; KANDAHAR 1880, AFGHANISTAN 1878-80

Its hard-won honours notwithstanding, the third regiment was disbanded in 1882.

The 1st and 2nd Regiments joined the Bombay line in 1885 as the 5th and 6th Bombay Cavalry respectively.

In the reformed Indian Army in 1903 they were likewise redesignated 35th Scinde Horse and 36th Jacob's Horse.

==== Infantry ====
Jacob's Rifles, raised in 1858 by Maj. John Jacob.

In 1861 the rifles joined the Bombay line as the 30th Regiment of Bombay Native Infantry.

The regiment was honoured for its part in the Second Afghan War with AFGHANISTAN 1878-80

Designated 130th Baluchis in 1903, the subsidiary title was restored in 1910.

==== Artillery ====
The force was augmented with No. 2 Coy. Bombay Native Artillery in 1875, when that company relieved the men of Jacob's Rfles manning the guns of the force headquarters at Jacobabad.

Converted to a mountain battery the following year, the company was accordingly redesignated No. 2 Bombay Mountain Battery.

For its part in the Second Afghan War the battery was awarded the honour AFGHANISTAN 1878-80

Later re-numbered as No. 6 (Bombay) Mountain Battery, and then briefly renamed the Jullundur Mountain Battery, the unit took its place in the reformed Indian Army of 1903 as 26th Jacob's Mountain Battery.

=== Frontier Brigade ===
Created in 1846 to police the newly acquired Punjab border against the Pakhtun hill tribes.

The brigade was formed by Lt. Col. Henry Montgomery Lawrence from four regiments of infantry raised in 1846 from veterans of the Sikh forces disbanded after the First Anglo-Sikh War:-

- 1st Regiment, raised at Hoshiarpur by Capt. J. S. Hodson.
- 2nd Regiment, raised at Kangra by Capt. J. W. V. Stephen.
- 3rd Regiment, raised at Firozpur by Capt. F. Winter.
- 4th Regiment, raised at Ludhiana by Capt. C. Mackenzie.

The brigades Frontier designation was discontinued in 1847, and the four regiments became Sikh Local Infantry.

For their part in the Second Sikh War the 1st and 2nd (or Hill) regiments were awarded the battle honour 'PUNJAUB'.

=== Transfrontier Brigade ===
Formed by Col. Henry Lawrence in 1849.

==== Cavalry ====
Five cavalry regiments were raised in 1849 and designated Punjab Cavalry:-

- 1st Regiment, raised at Peshawar by Lt. H. Daly.
- 2nd Regiment, raised at Lahore by Lt. S. J. Browne.
- 3rd Regiment, raised at Lahore by Lt. W. G. Prendergast.
- 4th Regiment
- 5th Regiment, raised at Multan by Capt. R. Fitzgerald.

==== Infantry ====
Five infantry regiments were raised in 1849 from Sikh Darbar regiments disbanded after the Second Anglo-Sikh War, and designated Punjab Infantry:-

- 1st Regiment, raised at Peshawar by Capt. John Coke.
- 2nd Regiment, raised at Mianwali by Lt. L. C. Johnston.
- 3rd Regiment
- 4th Regiment, raised at Lahore by Capt. George Gladwin Denniss II.
- 5th Regiment, raised at Leiah by Capt. James Eardley Gastrell.
- 6th Regiment, originally raised at Karachi in 1843 as the Scinde Camel Corps, and redesignated Punjab Infantry in 1853.

=== Punjab Irregular Force ===
Formed in 1851 by combining the Corps of Guides, the four regiments of Sikh Local Infantry, the Transfrontier Brigade, and five batteries of artillery. The units of the force came to be known collectively from its initials as Piffers.

==== Cavalry ====
The Punjab Cavalry regiments were redesignated Cavalry, Punjab Irregular Force.

While the 3rd and 4th regiments remained on the frontier, the 1st, 2nd, and 5th were employed in suppressing the Sepoy Revolt, and later rewarded with the battle honours DELHI 1857, and LUCKNOW.

==== Artillery ====
Batteries were raised from various sources:-

- No. 1 Horse Light Field Battery, PIF
- No. 2 Horse Light Field Battery, PIF, raised at Bannu in 1851 by Lt. H. Hammond, from detachments of horse artillery formerly in the service of the Lahore Darbar.
- No. 3 Horse Light Field Battery, PIF, raised at Dera Ghazi Khan in 1849 by Lt. D. McNeill, from a disbanded troop of horse artillery formerly in the service of the Lahore Darbar.
- No. 4 or Garrison Company, PIF, raised at Bannu in 1851 by Lt. S. W. Stokes, from the supernumeraries of a Sikh detachment of artillery which had been broken up and drafted into the horse light field batteries.

The Horse Light Field Batteries were generally known as Punjab Light Field Batteries.

Later the force gained two further batteries:-

- Hazara Mountain Train Battery, PIF, in 1856. (Formed at Haripur in 1851, by Lt. G. G. Pearse.)
- Peshawar Mountain Train Battery, PIF, in 1862. (Formed at Peshawar in 1853 by Capt. T. Brougham.)

==== Infantry ====
In 1857 the four regiments of Sikh Local Infantry became Sikh Infantry, Punjab Irregular Force.

The six Punjab Infantry regiments were simply redesignated Infantry, Punjab Irregular Force.

The 4th Regiment of Sikh Infantry served in the Second Burma War, winning the honour PEGU, and then marched 900 km from Abbottabad in thirty days to help suppress the revolt in Delhi, and like the Guides going into action on arrival. There it won also DELHI 1857. The other Sikh Infantry regiments remained in the Punjab.

Leaving the 3rd, 5th, & 6th Punjab Infantry Regiments to guard the frontier, the 1st, 2nd, and 4th were sent to put down the revolt in Delhi. There they earned the honour DELHI 1857. The 2nd and 4th regiments were also rewarded with LUCKNOW.

From 1861 the force included a 7th Infantry Regiment, formed from the Hazara Gurkha Battalion, which later that year joined the Gurkha Line as the 5th Gurkha Regiment.

=== Punjab Frontier Force ===
In 1865 the Punjab Irregular Force was renamed the Punjab Frontier Force, and the constituent units were redesignated accordingly.

During peacetime the Force was under the direct control of the Lt.-Governor of the Punjab, but in war it came under the Commander-in-Chief, India.

After the three Presidency armies, it was the most important military force at the Governor-General's disposal. Deployed and engaged in numerous border expeditions, it became the most experienced body of fighting troops in India. Most of the force saw action during the Second Afghan War. The designation Punjab Frontier Force was dropped in 1901, but with the Kitchener Reforms of the British Indian Army two years later, the former distinction was restored to the newly re-numbered regiments in the form of the subsidiary title Frontier Force.

==== Cavalry ====
Officially designated Cavalry, Punjab Frontier Force, the earlier style endured, and was restored in 1901.

Four of the regiments were honoured for service in the Second Afghan War:-

- 1st Punjab Cavalry; AHMED KHEL, AFGHANISTAN 1878-80
- 2nd Punjab Cavalry; AHMED KHEL, AFGHANISTAN 1878-80
- 3rd Punjab Cavalry; KANDAHAR 1880, AFGHANISTAN 1879-80
- 5th Punjab Cavalry; CHARASIA, KABUL 1879, AFGHANISTAN 1878-80

The 4th regiment served on the frontier before being disbanded in 1882.

In 1903 the four remaining regiments were brought into the new Indian Army line by adding twenty to their original numbers:-

- 21st Prince Albert Victor's Own Cavalry (Frontier Force) (Daly's Horse)
- 22nd Sam Browne's Cavalry (Frontier Force)
- 23rd Cavalry (Frontier Force)
- 25th Cavalry (Frontier Force)

==== Artillery ====
The two mountain trains were redesignated mountain batteries in 1865.

In 1876 the three Punjab Light Field Batteries were reduced to form two further mountain batteries, and the four were then renumbered according to their relative precedence, and designated Punjab Mountain Batteries, Punjab Frontier Force.

The former Garrison Company was also renumbered in the same sequence to become the No. 5 Garrison Battery, Punjab Frontier Force.

All four mountain batteries were honoured for their part in the Second Afghan War:-

- No. 1 (Kohat) Punjab Mountain Battery; PEIWAR KOTAL, KABUL 1879, AFGHANISTAN 1878-80
- No. 2 (Derajat) Punjab Mountain Battery; CHARASIA, KABUL 1879, KANDAHAR 1880, AFGHANISTAN 1878-80
- No. 3 (Peshawar) Punjab Mountain Battery; AFGHANISTAN 1878-79
- No. 4 (Hazara) Punjab Mountain Battery; ALI MASJID, KABUL 1879, AFGHANISTAN 1879-80

In 1895 the Derajat and Hazara Mountain Batteries were part of the relief expedition that was rewarded with the honour CHITRAL.

The Frontier Revolt of 1897-8 saw the Kohat and Derajat batteries in action again, earning the honours TIRAH and PUNJAB FRONTIER.

In 1901 the battery numbers were dropped, and they became known by name only. Two years later the four mountain batteries were re-numbered from twenty-one, and the former Piffer batteries were thus:-

- 21st Kohat Mountain Battery (Frontier Force)
- 22nd Derajat Mountain Battery (Frontier Force)
- 23rd Peshawar Mountain Battery (Frontier Force)
- 24th Hazara Mountain Battery (Frontier Force)
- The Frontier Garrison Artillery

==== Infantry ====
The four Sikh regiments were simply redesignated Sikh Infantry, Punjab Frontier Force.

The six former Punjab Infantry regiments were officially redesignated Infantry, Punjab Frontier Force, but the earlier style lingered and was restored in 1901.

Although never designated as such, the 5th Gurkha Regiment was brigaded with the force in practice.

All but two of the infantry regiments took the field in the Second Afghan War, and their subsequent awards were:-

- 1st Sikh Infantry; ALI MASJID, AFGHANISTAN 1878-80
- 2nd Sikh Infantry; AMED KHEL, KANDAHAR 1880, AFGHANISTAN 1878-80
- 3rd Sikh Infantry; KABUL 1879, KANDAHAR 1880, AFGHANISTAN 1879-80
- 1st Punjab Infantry; AFGHANISTAN 1878-79
- 2nd Punjab Infantry; PEIWAR KOTAL, AFGHANISTAN 1878-79
- 4th Punjab Infantry; AFGHANISTAN 1879-80
- 5th Punjab Infantry; PEIWAR KOTAL, CHARASIA, KABUL 1879, AFGHANISTAN 1878-80
- 5th Gurkha Regiment; PEIWAR KOTAL, CHARASIA, KABUL 1879, AFGHANISTAN 1878-80

Spending cuts after the war resulted in the disbandment of the 3rd Punjab Infantry in 1882.

Spared the same fate, the 4th Sikh Infantry was employed in the expedition of 1895 earning the honour CHITRAL.

The Frontier Revolt of 1897-8 saw the 3rd Sikh and 2nd Punjab Infantries employed in the Tirah Campaign, earning them the honors TIRAH and PUNJAB FRONTIER. The 5th Gurkha Rifles was also awarded PUNJAB FRONTIER.

In 1903 the four Sikh Infantry regiments were brought into the new Indian Army Line by adding fifty to their original numbers:-

- 51st Sikhs (Frontier Force)
- 52nd Sikhs (Frontier Force)
- 53rd Sikhs (Frontier Force)
- 54th Sikhs (Frontier Force)

The five remaining regiments of Punjab Infantry were consecutively renumbered in the same sequence to become:-

- 55th Coke's Rifles (Frontier Force)
- 56th Punjabi Rifles (Frontier Force)
- 57th Wilde's Rifles (Frontier Force)
- 58th Vaughan's Rifles (Frontier Force)
- 59th Scinde Rifles (Frontier Force)

The 5th Gurkha Rifles (Frontier Force) took on the subsidiary title denoting their origin.

=== Frontier Corps ===
Although the units of the Frontier Corps operated under a variety of titles, from Rifles to Militia to Scouts, it was the latter term that came to stand as the generic term, and as new units were formed, it was the word 'Scouts' that became fixed and formalised for the regimental titles. The expression 'Scouts' was a militarily neutral term, conveying neither the "crack" reputation associated with the word 'Rifles' (cf.: 60th Rifles [HM], Gurkha Rifles [IA], etc.), nor the rather second-rate expectations of the term 'Militia'. As General Baden-Powell noted, when he was looking, many years later, for a suitably inspiring term to adopt for his youth movement to train young boys in fieldcraft and other 'para-military' activities, the word Scouts encapsulated a spirit of 'dash' (enthusiasm), expertise - within a defined set of skills- and familiarity with both the local conditions. Similarly, the Scouts of the Frontier Corps understood both the local terrain and the local political minefields, that is, who could be trusted (e.g. the Turi), and who could never (almost invariably, this would mean the Mahsuds); who was currently nursing a grievance and therefore best avoided, and who had just had a claim settled to their satisfaction and might be uncharacteristically friendly.

Like many things British, the development of the units of Scouts into the Frontier Corps was organic, unplanned and initially unsystematic. It began, in the British manner, as an improvisation to meet a need; it was maintained because it guaranteed certain unique skills at an acceptable price (the great Empire may have vaunted its 'pomp and circumstance' to wow the impressionable, but behind the scenes the deciding factor was often simply the acceptability or otherwise to HM Treasury) and only then was the principle regularised, standardised and systemised (cf. the development of the Frontier Force, from irregulars to a corps d'elite).

==== Chronology ====
- 1878: the Khyber Rifles
- 1889: the Zhob Militia
- 1892: the Kurram Militia
- 1900: the Chitral Scouts
- 1900: the North Waziristan Militia
- 1900: the South Waziristan Militia
- 1913: the Gilgit Scouts
- 1914–18: the Great War in Europe and the Near East
- 1917: the Mohmand Militia
- 1919: Third Anglo-Afghan War
- 1919: Khyber Rifles disbanded
- 1921: South Waziristan Militia disbanded
- 1921: Mohmand Militia disbanded
- 1922: the Tochi Scouts
- 1922: the South Waziristan Scouts
- 1939–45: the Second World War
- 1946: the Pishin Scouts
- 1946: Khyber Rifles reformed
- 1947: independence of Pakistan in 1947
- 1948: the Chagai Militia
- 1949: the Northern Scouts
- 1949: the Thal Scouts
- 1960: the Mahsud Scouts
- 1961: the Bajaur Scouts
- 1964: the Karakoram Scouts
- 1965: the Kalat Scouts
- 1973: the Shawal Scouts

==== Location ====
Geographically, the Scouts were located, from north to south, as follows:

- The Gilgit Scouts. HQ: Gilgit
- The Chitral Scouts
- The Khyber Rifles
- The Kurram Militia. HQ: Parachinar
- The North Waziristan Militia, then: The Tochi Scouts. HQ: Miranshah.
- The South Waziristan Militia, then: The South Waziristan Scouts. HQ: (Militia): Wana, then (Scouts): Jandola.
- The Zhob Militia. HQ: Fort Sandeman
- (The Pishin Scouts)

==== Tribal affiliations ====
The Frontier Corps were not founded expressly on a tribal basis, but the older corps drew their recruits from the local tribal area:

- the Khyber Rifles from the tribes bordering the Khyber; namely the Afridi, Shinwari, and Mullagori
- the Kurram Militia from the Turi and Bangash of the Kurram Valley
- the Chitral Scouts from the Chitrali of Chitral

==== Notable men of the Frontier Corps ====
- George Roos-Keppel: founder of the Kurram Militia.

== See also ==
- Military history of Pakistan
- List of Pashtun empires and dynasties
- Bannu District
- Gomal River
- Kohat Pass
- Tank

== Other sources ==
- Army Headquarters, India (1919). Quarterly Indian Army List January 1919. Calcutta.
- Barthorp, Michael (1982). The North-West Frontier, Blandford Press. (first edition, later edition below).
- Barthorp, Michael (2002). Afghan Wars and the North-West Frontier 1839–1947. Cassell. London. ISBN 0-304-36294-8.
- Battles Nomenclature Committee (1921). The Official Names of the Battles and other Engagements fought by the Military Forces of the British Empire during the Great War, 1914–1919, and the Third Afghan War 1919. His Majesty's Stationery Office, London.
- Chenevix Trench, Charles (1985). The Frontier Scouts. Jonathan Cape. London. ISBN 0-224-02321-7.
- Cross, J. & Buddhiman Gurung (2002). Gurkhas at War. Greenhill Books. ISBN 978-1-85367-727-4.
- Jackson, Maj. Donovan (1940). India's Army. Sampson Low. London.
- General Staff Branch, Army Headquarters, India. (1926). The Third Afghan War 1919 Official Account. Government of India, Central Publication Branch. Calcutta.
- Nevill, Capt. H.L. (1912). Campaigns on the North-West Frontier. Reprinted by Battery Press, 1999.
- Official History of Operations on the N. W. Frontier of India 1920-35 Parts I, II and III. Naval & Military Press in association with the Imperial War Museum. ISBN 1843427648.
- Pervaz Iqbal Cheema (2002). The Armed Forces of Pakistan. Allen & Unwin. ISBN 1-86508-119-1.
- Robson, Brian (2004). Crisis on the Frontier: The Third Afghan War and the Campaign in Waziristan 1919–20. Spellmount. Staplehurst, Kent. ISBN 978-1-86227-211-8.
- Robson, Brian (2007). The Road to Kabul: The Second Afghan War 1878–1881. Spellmount. Stroud, Gloucestershire. ISBN 978-1-86227-416-7.
- Roger, Alexander (2003). Battle Honours of the British Empire and Commonwealth Land Forces 1662–1991. Crowood Press. Marlborough, Wiltshire. ISBN 1-86126-637-5.
- Stiles, Richard G. M. (1992). The Story of the India General Service Medal 1908–1935. Terence Wise. Knighton, Powys. ISBN 1-85674-010-2.
- Sumner, Ian (2001). The Indian Army 1914–1947. Osprey Publishing. Oxford. ISBN 1-84176-196-6.
- Swinson, Arthur (1967). North-West Frontier: People and Events 1839-1947. Hutchinson. London.
- Wilkinson-Latham, Robert (1977). North-West Frontier 1837–1947, Osprey Publishing. London. ISBN 0-85045-275-9.
- Moreman, Tim (1998). The Army in India and the Development of Frontier Warfare 1847–1947. Macmillan: London.
