= Mohmand expedition =

Mohmand expedition or Mohmand campaign may refer to these British Indian military operations against Mohmand tribesmen in the North-West Frontier Province:

- Mohmand Expeditions (1851–1852), early minor military expeditions against the Mohmands in 1851–52
- Later minor military expeditions against the Mohmands in 1878–80
- Mohmand campaign of 1897–1898, the first major military expedition
- Mohmand Expedition of 1908, a smaller expedition
- Operations against the Mohmands, Bunerwals and Swatis in 1915
- Mohmand blockade, a military blockade in 1916–17
- Mohmand campaign of 1935, the second major expedition

== See also ==
- Mohmand offensive, Pakistani Military offensive against militants near the Afghan border
