= List of uprisings against Entente powers during World War I =

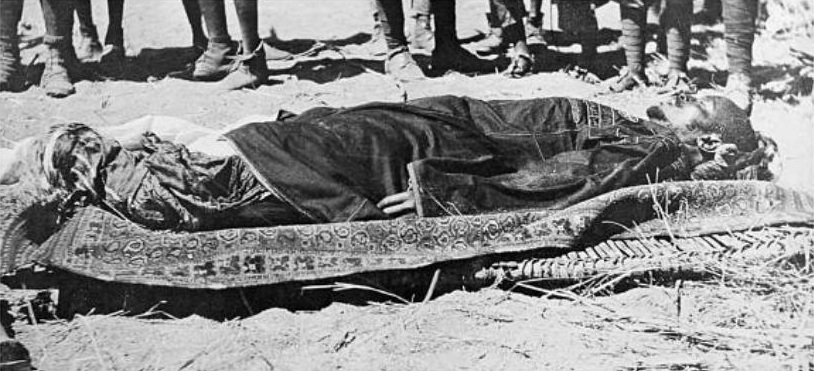
Photograph of Ali Dinar, last Sultan of Darfur, following his death in battle in 1916 at the hands of Anglo-Egyptian forces

The Triple Entente describes the informal understanding between the Russian Empire, the French Third Republic and the United Kingdom of Great Britain and Ireland. It formed a powerful counterweight to the Central Powers of Germany, Austria-Hungary, and Ottoman Empire. The conquest of many of these regions created resentment against the Entente colonial governments. Many of these regions had former uprisings or were in a constant state of rebellion.

When World War I broke out in late 1914 many communities saw it as their chance to overthrow the local colonial Entente governments. This was encouraged on 14 November 1914 when the religious leaders of the Ottoman Empire declared a holy war or jihad against the Entente powers.

== Australia ==
Name	Location	Insurrectionist	Entente Power	Start date	End date	Result	Notes
Battle of Broken Hill	Broken Hill, New South Wales, Australia	Badsha Mahommed Gool; Mullah Abdullah	Australia; United Kingdom	1 January 1915	1 January 1915	Suppressed	

== Africa ==
Name	Location	Insurrectionist	Entente Power	Start date	End date	Result	Notes
Maritz rebellion	South Africa	South African Republic	Union of South Africa; United Kingdom	15 September 1914	4 February 1915	Suppressed	
Ovambo Uprising	Portuguese Angola	Ovambo	Portugal	18 December 1914	6 February 1917	Suppressed	
Chilembwe uprising	Nyasaland (now Malawi)	Chilembwe and his followers	United Kingdom	23 January 1915	26 January 1915	Suppressed	
Bussa rebellion	Bussa, Nigeria	Supporters of Sabukki, a local prince of the Borgu Emirate	United Kingdom	June 1915	June 1915	Suppressed	
Adubi War	Colony and Protectorate of Nigeria	Egba rebels	United Kingdom	June 1918 June–July 1918	July 1918	Suppressed	
Volta–Bani War	Burkina Faso, Mali	Marka, Bwa, Lela, Nuna, and Bobo peoples	France	November 1915	February 1917	Suppressed	
Kel Ajjer uprising	Libya, Mali	Kel Ajjer and Senussi	France	1916	1920	Suppressed	

=== North Africa ===
Name	Location	Insurrectionist	Entente Power	Start date	End date	Result	Notes
Anglo-Egyptian Darfur Expedition	Darfur, now part of Sudan	Sultanate of Darfur	United Kingdom	16 March 1916	6 November 1916	Suppressed	
Senussi campaign	Egypt; Libya	Senussi	United Kingdom; Italy	January 1915	November 1918	Suppressed	
Zaian War	French protectorate of Morocco	Zaian Confederation	France	1914	1921	Suppressed	

== British India ==
Name	Location	Insurrectionist	Entente Power	Start date	End date	Result	Notes
Operations against the Mohmands, Bunerwals and Swatis in 1915	North-West Frontier Province, British India	2,000 men from Khost	United Kingdom	1915	1915	Suppressed	
Operations against the Mahsuds	North-West Frontier Province, British India	Mahsuds	United Kingdom	June 1917	July 1917	Suppressed	
Mohmand blockade	Mohmand border along North-West Frontier Province, British India	Mohmands	United Kingdom	1915	July 1917	Suppressed	
Operations in the Tochi	Tochi River, North-West Frontier Province, British India	Mohmands, Bunerwals and Swatis	United Kingdom	28 November 1914	27 March 1915	Suppressed	

== Europe ==
Name	Location	Insurrectionist	Entente Power	Start date	End date	Result	Notes
Easter Rising	Ireland	(Irish Republic) Irish nationalist forces	United Kingdom	24 April 1916	29 April 1916	Suppressed	
1914–1915 Muslim revolts in Albania	Albania	Albanian Muslim forces	Albania	23 November 1914	11 June 1915	Suppressed	

== Middle East ==
Name	Location	Insurrectionist	Entente Power	Start date	End date	Result	Notes
Muscat rebellion	Muscat and Oman (now Oman)	Imamate of Oman	United Kingdom	1913	25 September 1920	Suppressed	
