= Operations against the Mahsuds (1917) =

Military actions in the North-West Frontier Province of British India

- Part of North-West Frontier Theatre of WWI
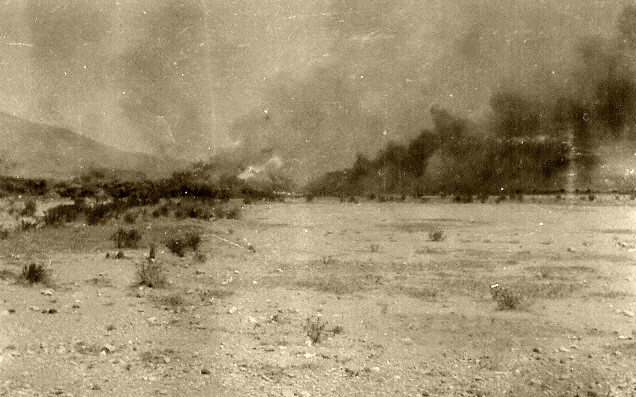
- A Mahsud village burning during the 1917 operations. From 15–19 June, British forces burnt and looted several abandoned Mahsud villages in their vicinity without opposition.
Date	June–July 1917
Location	North-West Frontier Province, British India
Result	British victory

Belligerents
United Kingdom: British India; Supported by: Nepal	Mahsud tribesmen

Commanders and leaders
Major-General William Benyon	Mahsud leader

Units involved
Bannu Brigade; Local militia	Mahsud tribesmen

In 1917, the British Empire launched a successful punitive expedition against the Mahsud in British India's North-West Frontier in order to deter raids and restore prestige.

== Background ==
Following a punitive expedition in 1900-02, the Mahsud had signed a peace agreement with the British authorities, bringing conflict to an end for the time being. However, in November 1913, the Mahsud chieftain, Mulla Powinda, died, and his son, Fazl-Din, disregarded the peace agreement and renewed raids, with encouragement from pro-Turkish and anti-British elements in the Afghan government.

Hostilities between the British and the Mahsud began with the "Tank outrage" of April 1914. In this incident, the Mahsud killed Major Dodd, the Political Agent for South Waziristan, in addition to 2 officers and 3 sepoys. Pro-Turkish and Anti-British elements in Kabul would encourage hostilities. From April 1914 to March 1915, the Mahsuds committed 81 raids classed as serious, which do not include numerous cases of cattle lifting, burglary, wire cutting and small offences. In 1916, Viceroy Frederic Thesiger was informed that:

no village is safe, and the Mahsuds raid from their hills right down to the banks of the Indus and Kill, entrap and abduct Hindus. Altogether the position of the people is pitiable, and we can do very little to protect them or even to alleviate their sufferings.

— George Roos-Keppel, January 1916

In March 1917, the Mahsud began raiding into the British Raj. Mahsud attacks throughout the first half of 1917 on pickets, garrisons and convoys belonging to the British prompted a punitive expedition in June. Having been incurred heavy losses in that year by the Mahsud, the British intended to restore their prestige.<re

== Conflict ==
British forces commanded by Major-General Benyon advanced into Mahsud tribal territory on the 6th. British forces engaged the Mahsud on the 7th, 12th, 19th, 20th, 21st, 23rd, and 24 June. On the 25th, hostilities ceased as the Mahsud began asking for peace. Part of the terms were that the Mahsuds had to hand rifles they had stolen - some of these came into the hands of British troops while they were still there. British troops began withdrawing on 12 July. The final peace agreement came on 10 August 1917 with a Mahsud jirga.

Many details of the conflict are provided in a private letter dating 20 August 1917 by Harry Edward Parker (5 Oct 1895 – 25 Dec 1969). Parker fought as a British soldier in this campaign.

== Aftermath ==
The news of the peace agreement came as a great relief to the India Office. "The North-west frontier of India is now hopefully free of trouble."

With the Mahsud defeated, resources of India were made available for reinforcing fronts elsewhere. In mid-July, it was arranged that 2 battalions would be sent to aid the allied war effort in east Africa.

== See also ==
- Mohmand blockade
- Operations against the Mohmands, Bunerwals and Swatis in 1915
- Royal Nepali Army at the Battle of Vajristhan
