= Khagan Expedition =

The Khagan Expedition of 1852 was a British campaign targeting the Sayyids of Kaghan Valley, allies of Sayyid Ahmed Barelvi.

== Background ==
Khagan is a mountainous valley in the northernmost part of the Hazara district, consisting of Sayyids and Gujjars, neighbouring the Kohistanis and Swatis to the west. The Sikhs had previously sent almost 10,000 troops to subdue the Sayyids, but had left the Sayyids to administer the land themselves, which the Sayyids had expected of the British. The British used the pretext of the Gujjar hostility with the Sayyids for the expedition, but their real reason was the Deputy Commissioner Abbott's suspicion that the Sayyids were in league with the Hindustani Fanatics, who had been stirring up other tribes, such as the Pothwari Dhund tribe of Hazara.

== Campaign ==
A force comprising six regiments, six guns, and numerous tribal levies (5,320 men in total) were sent against the Sayyids. The latter retreated to near Sum, Paras and Jaraid. Syed Zamin Shah was exiled and the Khagan valley was brought under British control.
