= Operations in the Tochi =

WWI Indian Army operations

- Part of World War I
Date	November 1914 – March 1915
Location	Tochi river flows East from the tribal territories, through North Waziristan, North-West Frontier Province
Result	Anglo-Indian victory

Belligerents
British Empire	Khost tribesmen

Commanders and leaders
(United Kingdom) Vere Fane (United Kingdom) Eustace Jotham †	Tribesmen leader

Units involved
Bannu Brigade; Local militia	Khost tribesmen

Strength
	7,000 tribesmen

Casualties and losses
Unknown, light	250+ killed

The Operations in the Tochi (28 November 1914 – 27 March 1915) were carried out by the Indian Army during World War I on the North West Frontier. The Tochi river flows East from the tribal territories, through North Waziristan, to join the Kurram and the Indus rivers. On the 28 and 29 November a raid by 2,000 tribesmen from Khost was defeated by the North Waziristan Militia near Miranshah, on the Tochi. The next January the militia again defeated a raid by tribesmen which had attacked Spina Khaisora. On 25–26 March a force of over 7,000 tribesmen, threatened Miranshah, but was defeated by the Bannu Brigade together with the local militia.

== Captain Eustace Jotham ==
It was during these operations when Captain Eustace Jotham was awarded the Victoria Cross.

=== Citation ===
For most conspicuous bravery on 7th January, 1915, at Spina Khaisora (Tochi Valley). During operations against the Khostwal tribesmen, Captain Jotham, who was commanding a party of about a dozen of the North Waziristan Militia, was attacked in a nullah and almost surrounded by an overwhelming force of some 1,500 tribesmen. He gave the order to retire, and could have himself escaped, but most gallantly sacrificed his own life by attempting to effect the rescue of one of his men who had lost his horse.

— The London Gazette, 23 July 1915

He was buried in the Miranshah Cemetery, North Waziristan, and is commemorated on the Delhi Memorial (India Gate).

== See also ==
- Mohmand blockade
- Operations against the Mohmands, Bunerwals and Swatis in 1915
