= Ranizai Expedition (1852) =

Ranizai/Utman-Khel Expedition
Date	March–May 1852
Location	Swat, North-West Frontier
Result	British victory

Belligerents
British Empire	Ranizai Tribesmen Utman-Khel Tribesmen

Commanders and leaders
Brig. Sir C. Campbell	Unknown

Strength
Around 3,000 6 cannons	6,000+

Casualties and losses
14 killed 44 wounded	Unknown

The Ranizai Expedition was a British-Indian military expedition to the North-West Frontier Province in Pakistan.
