= Vere Fane (Indian Army officer) =

Major-General Sir Vere Fane KCB KCIE KStJ
- Portrait by Walter Stoneman, 1919
- Born: Vere Bonamy Fane; 16 June 1863
- Died: 23 May 1924 (aged 60)
- Burial place: Fulbeck, Lincolnshire, England
- Military career
- Allegiance: United Kingdom
- Branch: British Army; British Indian Army
- Service years: 1884–1888; 1888–1924
- Rank: Major-General
- Commands: 21st Punjabis; Jhelum Brigade; Bannu Brigade
- Awards: Knight Commander of the Order of the Bath; Knight Commander of the Order of the Indian Empire; Mentioned in Despatches (3); Croix de Guerre; Order of the Nile (2nd class)

Major-General Sir Vere Bonamy Fane, KCB, KCIE, KStJ (16 June 1863 – 23 May 1924) was an officer in the British Army and British Indian Army. He served in the Boxer Rebellion and First World War.

== Career ==
Vere Fane was commissioned as a lieutenant in the Manchester Regiment on 12 November 1884 and in March 1888 transferred to the Bengal Staff Corps of the British Indian Army. Promoted to captain on 12 November 1895, he was on 1 April 1900 appointed deputy assistant adjutant-general in Derajat, attached to the Punjab Command. Only months later, he was in August 1900 appointed to serve on the staff of the Indian Cavalry Brigade that formed part of the China Field Force during the Boxer Rebellion, and from October that year acted as Provost marshal and police commissioner in Tianjin. For his services during the campaign, he was Mentioned in Despatches by Lieutenant-General Sir Alfred Gaselee, and by Major-General O'Moore Creagh. Fane had returned home by October 1902.

He was promoted to major on 12 November 1902, and received a brevet promotion to lieutenant colonel on 26 June 1903, for his service in China. He was further brevetted to Colonel in 1909 when he was appointed Commandant (Commanding Officer) of the 21st Punjabis. Substantive promotions to Lieutenant Colonel and Colonel followed and on the outbreak of the First World War he was appointed as temporary Brigadier General commanding the Jhelum Brigade. Fane was appointed Companion of the Order of the Bath in January 1914 in the 1914 New Year Honours.

In 1915 Fane was commanding officer of the Bannu Brigade on the North West Frontier and in recognition for his actions during the attack on Miranshah in March he was made a Companion of the Order of the Indian Empire. Fane was promoted to temporary Major General on 3 September 1916, and served in the campaigns in Palestine and Mesopotamia. His service in these campaigns earned him promotion to Knight Commander of the Order of the Indian Empire, and two awards from foreign governments; the Croix de Guerre and the Order of the Nile (2nd class). He was also Mentioned in Despatches twice more, on 15 August 1917, and on 27 August 1918. His rank of major general became substantive on 1 January 1917.

On 5 July 1918 Fane became Colonel of the 21st Punjabis (a ceremonial appointment), and in 1920 also Colonel of the Manchester Regiment. He continued to serve with the Indian Army, being a district commander in Burma. Two further honours followed, promotion to Knight Commander of the Order of the Bath in January 1921 and appointment as Knight of Grace of Order of the Hospital of St John of Jerusalem. At his own request he relinquished his appointment with the army in Burma in April 1924 but died shortly after and was buried in Fulbeck, Lincolnshire.
