= Shirani Expedition =

Shirani and Kasrani Tribesmen
Date	April, 1853
Location	Suleiman Mountains, Pakistan
Result	British victory

Belligerents
British Empire	Shirani and Kasrani Tribesmen

Commanders and leaders
Brig. Sir C. Campbell	Unknown

Strength
1,500–3,000	Several Thousand

Casualties and losses
Unknown	Unknown

The Shirani Expedition was a British-Indian military expedition to the North-West Frontier Province in Pakistan.
