= Bannu Brigade =

The Bannu Brigade was formed after the 1903 reforms of the British Indian Army by Herbert Kitchener when he was Commander-in-Chief, India. The brigade was part of the Northern Army and deployed along the North West Frontier. In 1914 at the start of World War I the composition of the brigade was:

- Commander Major General Hugh O'Donnell
  - 25th Cavalry (Frontier Force)
  - 33rd Punjabis
  - 52nd Sikhs (Frontier Force)
  - 55th Coke's Rifles (Frontier Force)
  - 29 Mountain Battery

The brigade was involved in the Operations in the Tochi between November 1914 and March 1915 when it was commanded by Major-General Vere Bonamy Fane.

== See also ==
- List of Indian Army Brigades in World War II

== Sources ==
- Sumner, Ian (2001). The Indian Army 1914-1947. Osprey Publishing. ISBN 1-84176-196-6.
