= Frederick Campbell (British Army officer, born 1860) =

British general

General Sir Frederick Campbell KCB DSO
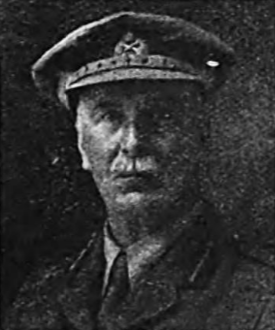
- Born: 25 February 1860; Edinburgh, Scotland
- Died: 23 August 1943 (aged 83)
- Military career
- Allegiance: United Kingdom
- Branch: British Army
- Service years: 1877–1920
- Rank: General
- Commands: 1st (Peshawar) Division; 40th Pathans; Guides Infantry
- Conflicts: Hazara Expedition of 1888; Chitral Expedition; Mohmand campaign of 1897–1898; First World War
- Awards: Knight Commander of the Order of the Bath; Distinguished Service Order; Mentioned in Despatches

General Sir Frederick Campbell, KCB, DSO (25 February 1860 – 29 August 1943) was a British Army officer who is best known for the Younghusband Expedition to Tibet in 1903–1904.

== Early life ==
Campbell was a student of Wellington College, Berkshire.

== Military career ==
Campbell went to the Royal Military College, Sandhurst, and after he graduated he was deployed to India where he took part in the Hazara Expedition of 1888 and the Chitral Relief Expedition in 1895. While based in the North-West Frontier Province, he served in battles against local tribesmen in 1897 (Siege of Malakand), 1897–1898 (Operations in Mamund country).

He was promoted to major general on 29 June 1911.

During the First World War, religious leaders in the Ottoman Empire called for a holy war against the British. This inspired tribesmen of the North-West Frontier Province to revolt. During this time Campbell commanded the 1st (Peshawar) Division between 26 June 1915 and 1919. He was promoted to lieutenant general on 1 January 1917.

He was promoted to general on 28 January 1919 and retired from the Indian Army on 28 January 1920.

== Bibliography ==
Notes

References

- Burke, Bernard; Pirie-Gordon, Charles Harry Clinton (1937). Genealogical and Heraldic History of the Landed Gentry. Shaw. - Total pages: 2,756
- Gündoğdu, Doç. Dr. Raşit (11 March 2020). The Sultans of the Ottoman Empire. Rumuz Yayınları. ISBN 9786055112158. - Total pages: 262
- King's College London (2021). "General Sir Frederick Campbell (1860–1943)". King's College London.
- National Army Museum (2021). "The North-West Frontier". National Army Museum.
