= Operations against the Mohmands, Bunerwals and Swatis in 1915 =

Military operations in India

Operations against the Mohmands, Bunerwals Yousafzai and Swat Yousafzai in 1915
- Part of the First World War
Date	April–September 1915
Location	North of Peshawar, North-West Frontier Province
Result	Anglo–Indian victory

Belligerents
British Empire	Mohmands, Bunerwals Yousafzai and Swat Yousafzai

Commanders and leaders
Frederick Campbell	

Units involved
	Mohmands, Bunerwal and Swat Yousafzai

The Operations against the Mohmands, Bunerwals Yousfuzai and Swat Yousafzai were carried out by the Indian Army. The first operation began at the start of 1915, with a raid by the Mohmands near the Shabkadr Fort in Peshawar. In April, operations continued against the Mohmands, when 2,000 men attacked the troops of the 1st (Peshawar) Division and were defeated near Hafiz Kor.

The Operations against the Mohmands, Bunerwal Yousafzais and Swat Yousafzai) lasted from 17 August to 28 October. The three peoples inhabit the northern half of the Peshawar district. Fighting began with the defeat of about 3,500 Bunerwals near Rustam on the 17 August and ended with the rout of 3,000 Bajauris near the village of Wuch north of Chakdara. Another six small engagements were fought; the most important was on 5 September at Hafiz Kor, when 10,000 men were defeated. The Mohmands continued their raids which led to the construction of the Mohmand blockade or fortified wall spanning the Mohmand border.

== See also ==
- Charles Hull was awarded the Victoria Cross for his actions during this conflict
- Uprisings against Entente Powers during WWI

== Bibliography ==
- National Army Museum (2021). "The North-West Frontier". National Army Museum.
- Sykes, Percy (2014). A History of Afghanistan. Vol. I. Routledge. ISBN 978-1-317-84587-4.
