= Mohmand blockade =

Anglo-Pashtun conflict in World War I

- Part of the First World War
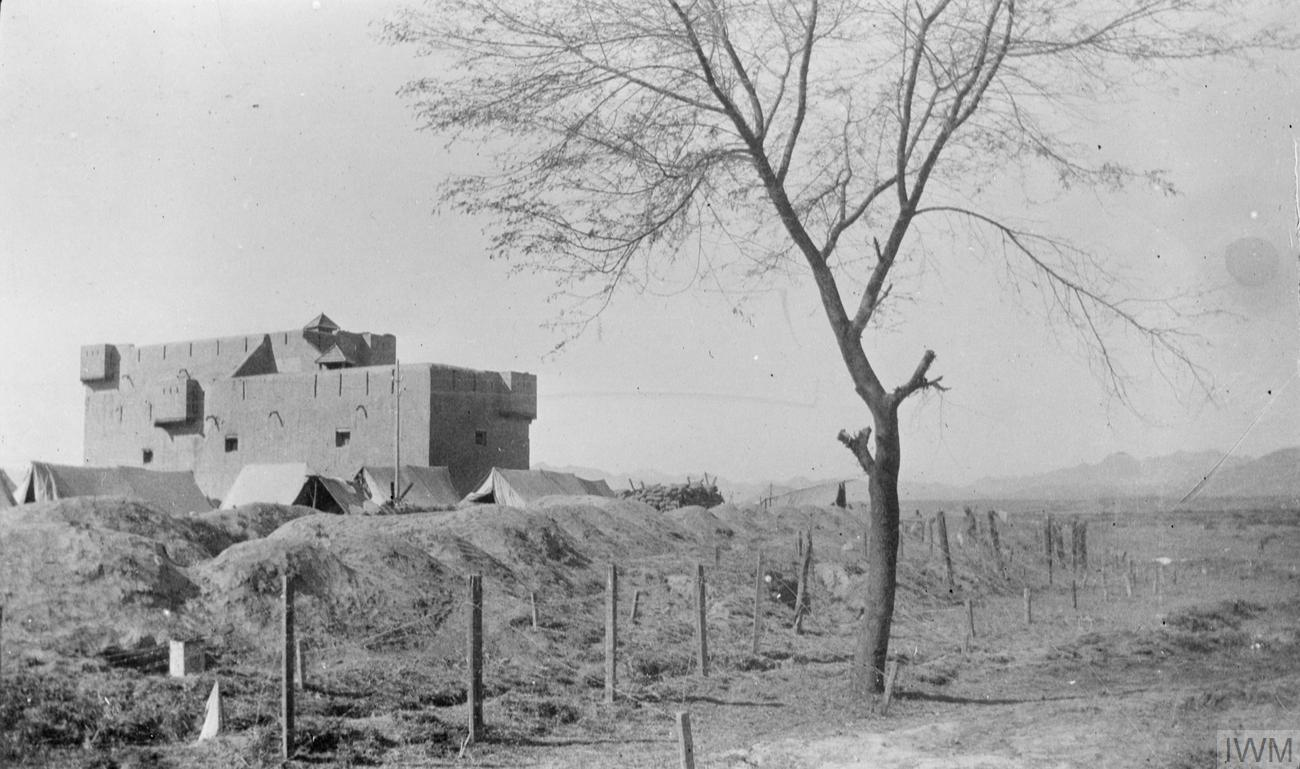
- Police post built in the corner of Subhan Khwar Camp, as part of the Mohmand blockade, on the road between Fort Shabkadar and Michni
Date	September 1916 – July 1917
Location	North-West Frontier Province
Result	Anglo–Indian victory

Belligerents
British Empire	Mohmands

The Mohmand blockade (1916–1917) was a line of blockhouses and barbed wire defences, along the Mohmand border on the North West Frontier by the Indian Army.

== Background ==
In 1915 the Mohmands declared a holy war or jihad against the British. The blockade began after a number of Mohmand raids into Peshawar, they sent large numbers of lashkars (In Mughal and Urdu culture the word is used to describe a "swarm like formation in any army") at British positions. The most important engagement occurred on 15 November 1916, at Hafiz Kor, when a Mohmand force was defeated. The blockade was eventually lifted in July 1917 when the Mohmands submitted.

== See also ==
- Operations against the Mohmands, Bunerwals and Swatis in 1915

== Bibliography ==
- Macro, Paul (February 19, 2019). Action at Badama Post: The Third Afghan War, 1919. Casemate. ISBN 978-1-61200-760-1.
